= HVW =

HVW or Hvw may refer to:

- HVW, station code for Henk Sneevlietweg metro station, Netherlands
- HVW, station code for Hillview MRT station, Singapore
- HVW-Pokal, handball competition won by Neckarsulmer SU (women's handball), Germany
- HVW Focus, West German distributor of 1975 film That Malicious Age
- Hvw, code for signal box in field by Hamm (Westfalen) Hauptbahnhof, Germany
- HVW Inc., purchaser of Columbus Railway, Power & Light office property, United States
