= Smart Columbus =

Technology development organization in US

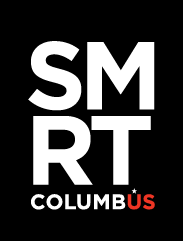

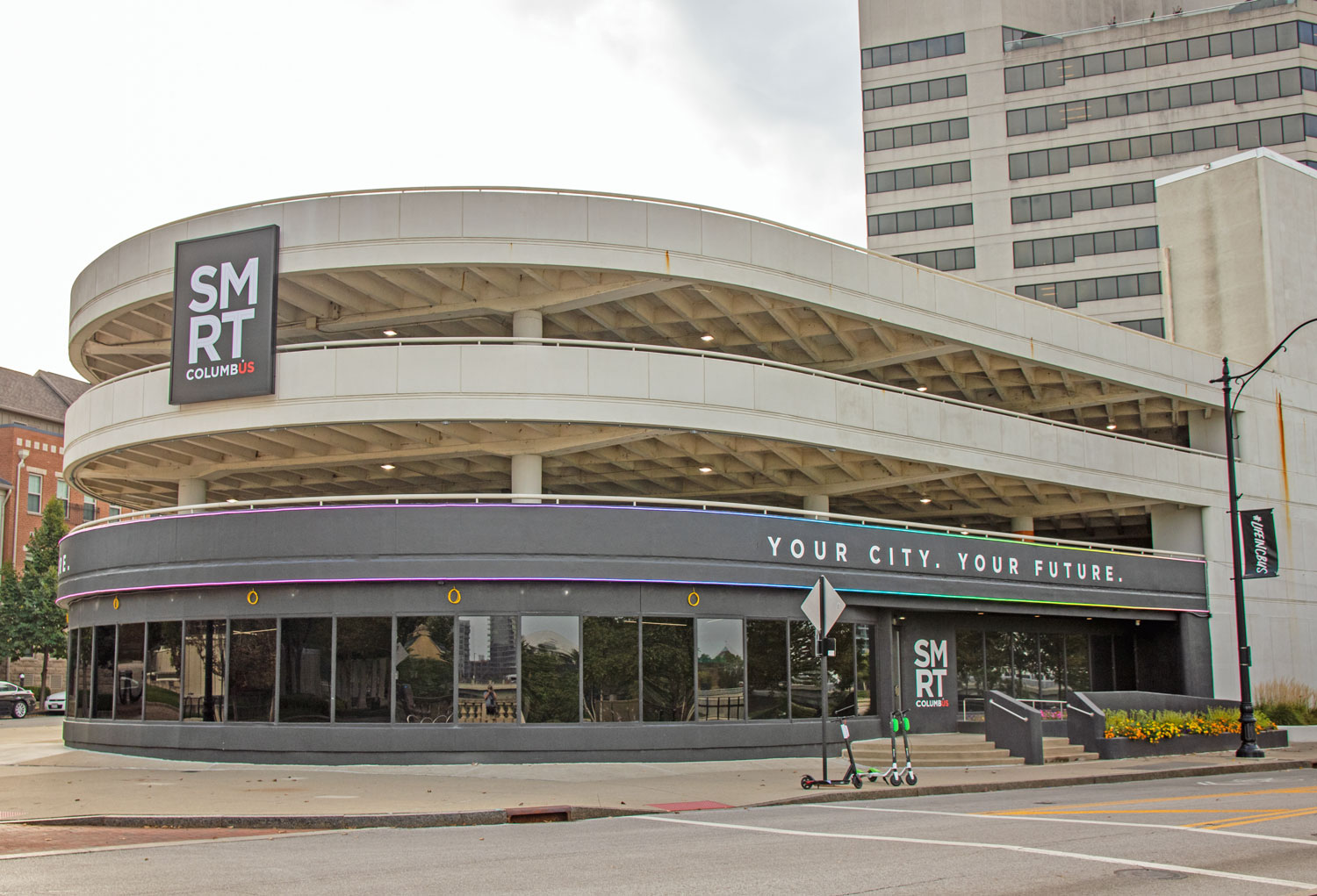
- The Smart Columbus Experience Center
- Established: 2016; 10 years ago
- Coordinates: 39.958209°N 83.002854°W
- Director: Jordan Davis
- Website: smartcolumbus.com

Smart Columbus is an innovation organization in Columbus, Ohio. The initiative is led by the City of Columbus and the Columbus Partnership, a nonprofit organization for development in Central Ohio. Smart Columbus was founded in 2016 to utilize $50 million in grant awards toward technology, transportation, and environmental developments.

== Organization ==
Smart Columbus has 12 full-time employees.

=== Projects and goals ===
Smart Columbus aims to replace conventional automobiles with public and electric transportation. Car dependency is high in Columbus – 85 percent of residents in the region drive to and from work.

One of the program's initiatives is to install 925 electric vehicle charging stations in Central Ohio by the end of 2020. As of September 2020, the organization had installed 914.

Smart Columbus has also been testing driverless shuttle technology through pilot programs beginning in 2018.

The organization has developed six "Smart Mobility Hubs" along the Central Ohio Transit Authority's CMAX bus line. The mobility hubs aim to solve last-mile problems by linking the bus rapid transit line with conventional and electric bicycles, electric scooters, and automobiles. The hubs will have chargers and docks for scooters and bikes, spots for car-share vehicles, and ride-hailing drop-off points. They will also feature interactive kiosks that share transit information, provide free Wi-Fi, list nearby restaurants, retail, and resources, issue public service announcements, and have an emergency call button.

Another issue Smart Columbus is addressing is vehicle safety – installing technology in 350 to 500 private vehicles and 750 city, county, and transit vehicles. The equipment installed is to give real-time safety alerts to drivers, and assess how it impacts driver safety. The study is to take place in and around Linden, home to seven of 100 intersections with the highest volume of car crashes in Central Ohio. The roads studied are North High Street, Morse Road, and Cleveland Avenue.

The Smart Columbus Operating System is a database of projects for use by software developers and the general public. The system has data for multiple projects the organization has been working on.

One early goal, to platoon trucks to move efficiently while traveling, was eliminated. Another goal, a mobile app to plan routes using multiple transit options, launched its beta in 2019. The app, Pivot, was not given a payment system as originally planned.

Smart Columbus also aimed to help sell 2,998 electric vehicles, as part of its $10 million grant from the Paul G. Allen Family Foundation. During the course of the program, 3,458 electric vehicles were sold, primarily the battery-electric Tesla models 3, S, and X.

== Experience center ==
The Smart Columbus Experience Center, located on the Scioto Mile in Downtown Columbus, was created as a showroom for electric vehicles. In 2019, it was planned to also feature innovations in connected devices, autonomous technology, and other smart city technology.

== History ==
Smart Columbus was founded in 2016. The city was selected to receive $40 million from the U.S. Department of Transportation to develop a "smart city", a grant which was met with millions of dollars in nonprofit and private investments. The federal grant was part of a competition among 77 cities to receive the funding. Columbus, as the Midwest's fastest-growing city, proposed strong ideas connecting its problems with measurable solutions. The grant would be used to develop technologies and share data, allowing the technologies to be replicated in other cities. The Paul G. Allen Family Foundation gave a $10 million grant to reduce greenhouse gas emissions through decarbonizing and electrifying vehicles. The largest private donor, AEP, contributed $185 million toward de-carbonization and electric grid projects.

The organization's Smart Columbus Experience Center opened in June 2018. A celebratory opening took place on June 29 of that year.

Smart Columbus's deadline is set for mid-2021, extended from originally around August 2020. As of June 2020, there are still numerous projects to accomplish. One goal met was to have at least 3,200 electric vehicles sold by March 2020, and it expects to hit its goal of 1,000 electric vehicle charging stations.

=== Driverless shuttle programs ===
In 2018, the organization piloted a free driverless shuttle system on a three-mile route around the Scioto Mile. The white-and-green self-driving shuttles had with six seats, including one for an attendant, able to take control of the shuttle if needed. The program cost was estimated at $550,000, co-funded by the Columbus Partnership and DriveOhio. The Transport Workers Union and other employees of the Central Ohio Transit Authority, the local bus system, opposed the shuttle system for customer safety. The program was intended to be the first of three driverless shuttle pilot programs.

In May 2019, the city approved $1.1 million for automated shuttles from the company EasyMile. On February 5, 2020, Smart Columbus began testing two 12-passenger self-driving shuttles in Linden, a low-income neighborhood in the city. The program was set to end in February 2021. Its test drives were temporarily halted that February, when one shuttle unexpectedly stopped and caused a passenger to fall, with minor injuries. On July 29, the program resumed, to be completed in March 2021. The pilot will be used to transport boxes of food for people in need during the COVID pandemic, which hit the United States in March. Smart Columbus is assessing resuming passenger service on the shuttles.
