= Milo Arts =

Arts center in Columbus, Ohio

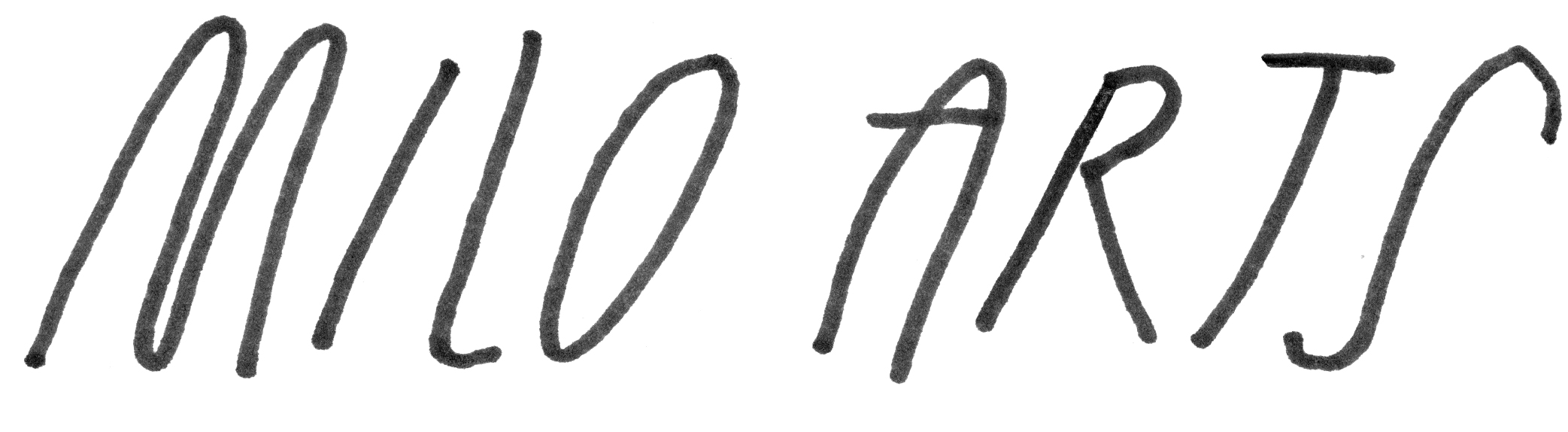

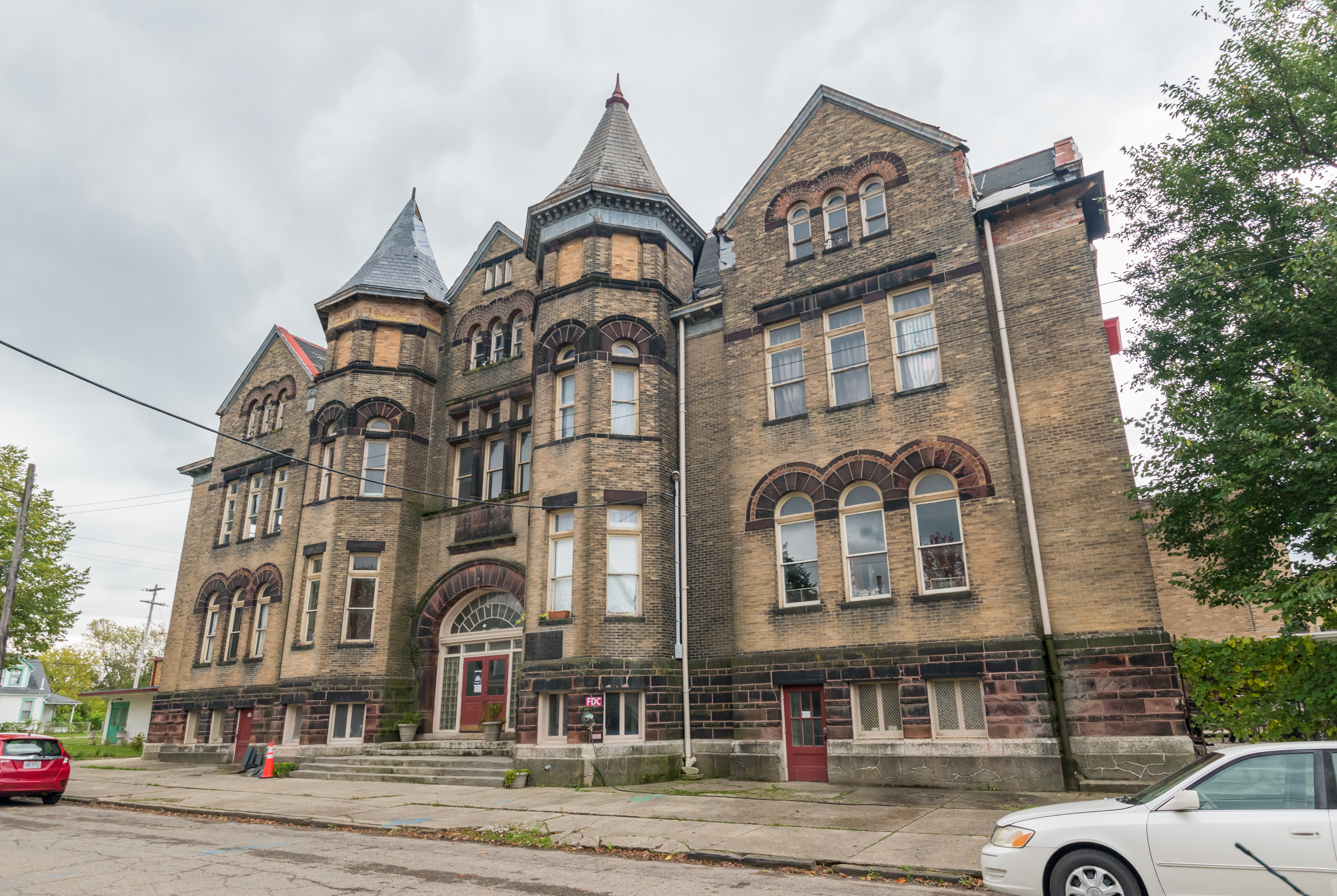
- Interactive map of the Milo Arts area
- Former names: Milo Public School, Milo Elementary School

General information
- Location: 617 E. 3rd Avenue
- Coordinates: 39.983216°N 82.988088°W
- Completed: 1894

Design and construction
- Architect: John M. Freese

Other information
- Parking: Surface lot, street
- Public transit: 6, CMAX

Website
- www.miloarts.com

Milo Arts is a community arts center and former public school building in the Milo-Grogan neighborhood of Columbus, Ohio. The arts center was founded in 1988, and was considered a radical concept at the time. It is the longest-lasting artist live-work space in Columbus.

It is, along with the former Columbus Railway, Power & Light office, one of the two most important historic structures in Milo-Grogan. It is a top priority for preservation for neighborhood leaders.

== History ==
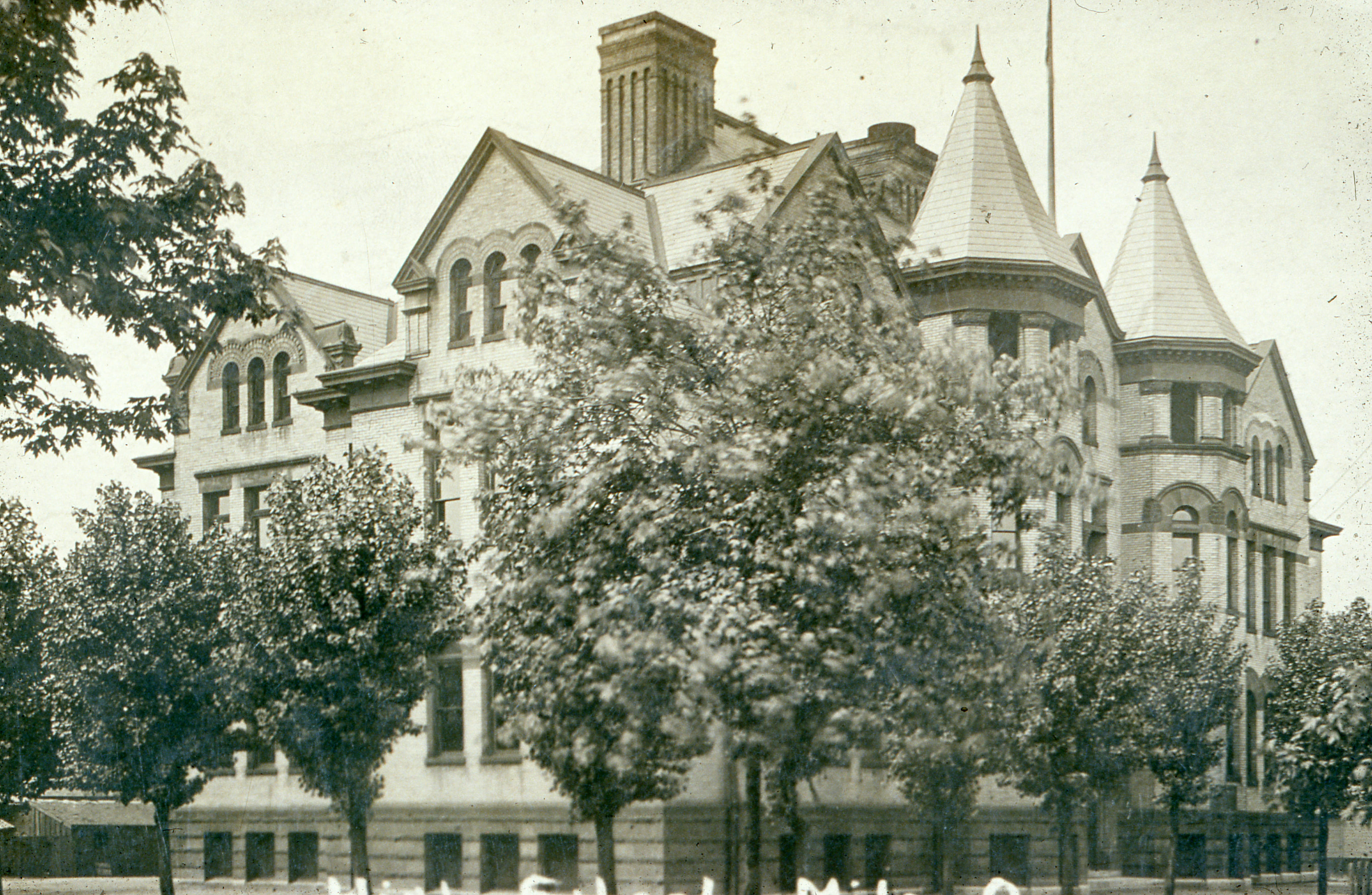
The building in 1909

The building was constructed in 1894, before Milo-Grogan's annexation into Columbus. It became home to a faith mission, which vacated the building in 1988. The current owners, Rick Mann and Russell Snider, purchased the building in 1983 and opened Milo Arts in 1988. The building was in disrepair when the current owners acquired it, and despite repairs, the building was almost forced to be closed due to code violations. Mann filed for bankruptcy in 2007 and 2009, though was helped through a fundraiser and family support.

Milo Arts is seen as a holdout despite the area's gentrification. Despite rising neighborhood rents, Mann keeps rents in the building low. He blocks efforts from developers wishing to purchase the building. About 40 people live in the building.

In 2012, a Columbus Dispatch investigation found that the building's tenants were living in hazardous conditions. Mann had not fixed code violations dating to 2001, and the city had failed to keep track of the issues. Mann has struggled to make repairs due to difficult finances, and tenants are often willing to live there despite its issues. In 2021, a worker repairing the building's roof fell to his death.

== See also ==
- Schools in Columbus, Ohio
