= William J. Lhota Building =

Historic building in Columbus, Ohio

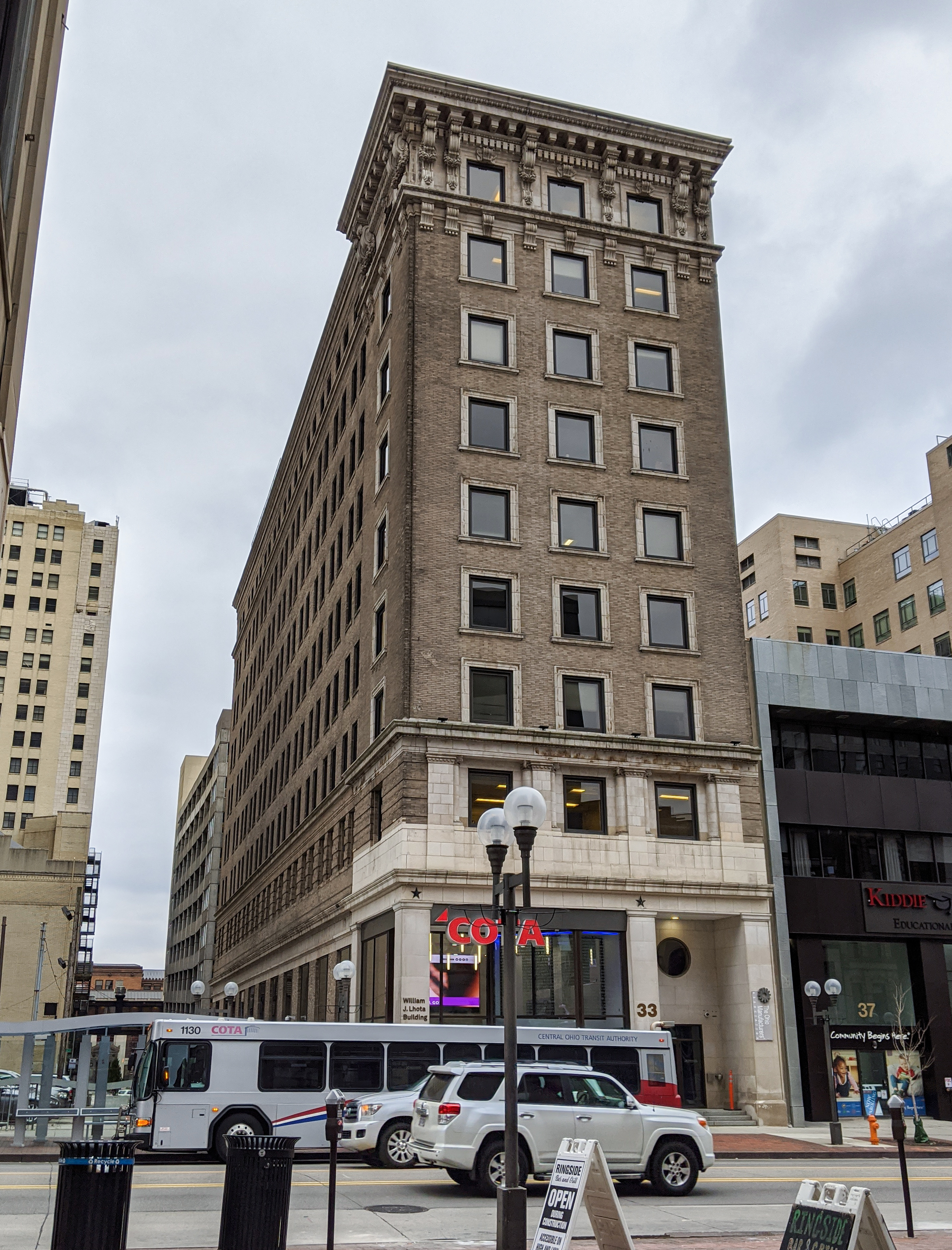

General information
- Location: 33 N. High Street, Columbus, Ohio, United States
- Coordinates: 39°57′47″N 83°00′05″W
- Completed: 1905
- Owner: Central Ohio Transit Authority

Height
- Height: 116 ft (35 m)

Technical details
- Floor count: 10
- Floor area: 80,000 square feet (7,400 m^{2})

Design and construction
- Architecture firm: McCollum & Dowler
- New First National Bank Building
- U.S. Historic district – Contributing property
- Part of: High and Gay Streets Historic District (ID14000041)

The William J. Lhota Building is a historic office building on High Street in downtown Columbus, Ohio. The building is primarily known as the headquarters of the Central Ohio Transit Authority (COTA), the city's transit system. It is owned by COTA, with some office space leased to other organizations. The building was added to the National Register of Historic Places as part of the High and Gay Streets Historic District in 2014.

== Attributes ==
The building is also known by its address, 33 N. High Street, and as the New First National Bank Building. The Central Ohio Transit Authority is headquartered here. The 80,000-square-foot (7,400 m^{2}) building holds its administrative offices, a bus operator check-in, pass sales offices, and ticket machines. The building was designed and built for a bank on the first floor and office tenants above. It has always housed offices in its upper floors, mostly for law and insurance companies.

The building was chosen as COTA's headquarters due to its location near the center of downtown (at Broad and High streets) and at the center of the agency's transit network, which still operates predominantly under a hub-and-spoke model. It gives greater prominence to the agency, and better convenience and accessibility to riders. It was intended to demonstrate the agency's commitment to downtown, which has been suffering economically in recent decades. The building also includes no employee parking, motivating COTA staff to take the bus over driving.

The building has a LEED silver rating from the U.S. Green Building Council, granted in 2012 for the building's recent interior renovation.

=== Architecture ===
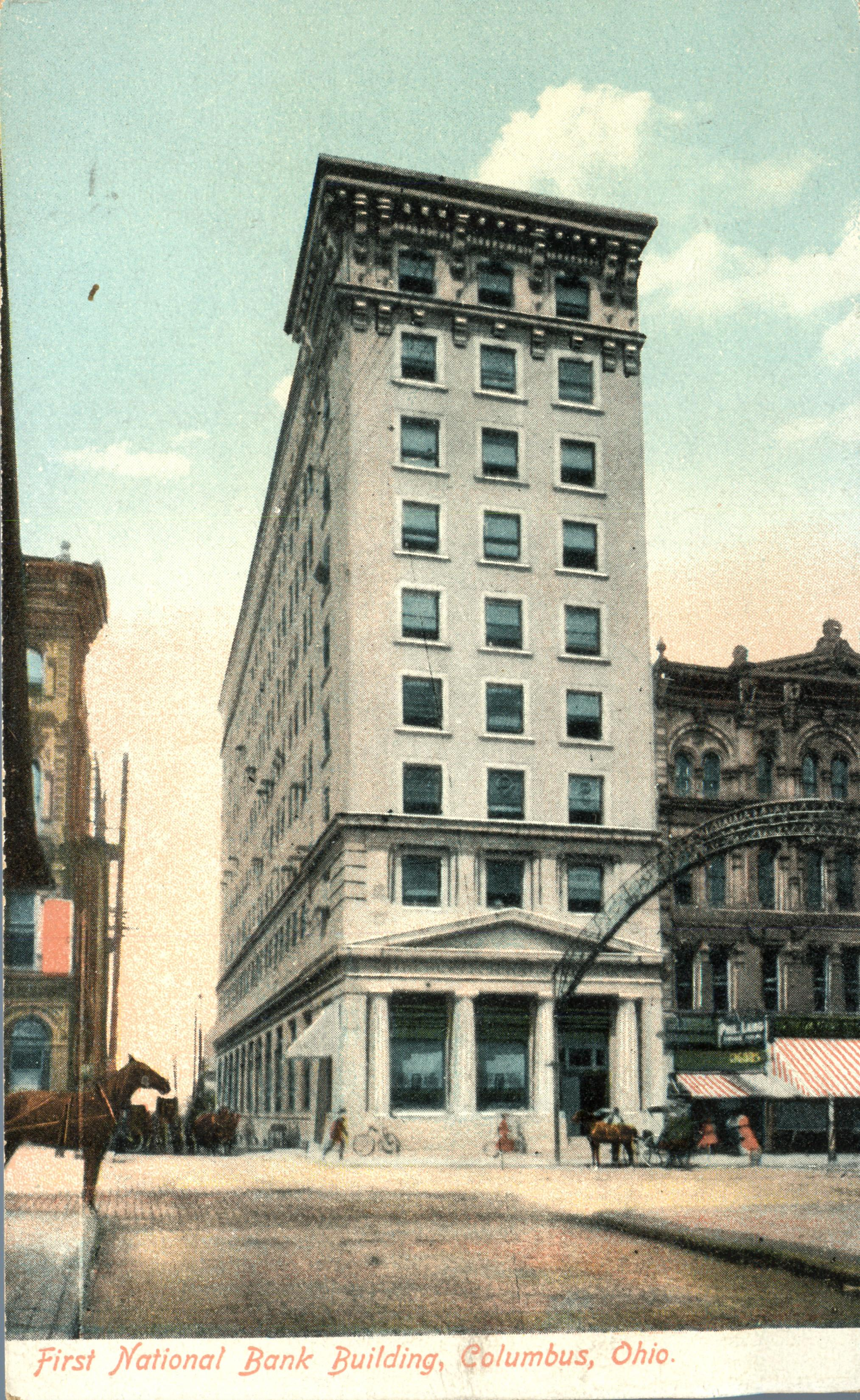
The building while operating as a bank

It was designed by the Pittsburgh architects McCollum & Dowler, and it appears to be the only building in the city designed by them. It is one of the largest and most intact buildings, as well as the tallest in the High and Gay Streets Historic District. It is one of four historic bank buildings in the district, all of which are contributing properties. The Lhota Building has a typical early 20th century commercial design, with three parts to its overall design, details of classical architecture, and a decorative cornice. Its steel frame construction followed a trend beginning to appear throughout downtown. Many buildings downtown also were built to include commercial space, several with banks on the first floor and offices for rent above. The Lhota Building is prominent among these remaining buildings, with its top floor and decorative cornice visible from blocks away.

The building's main facade facing east has three bays, while its south facade has twenty-three. The building uses buff-colored brick on its exterior, and has terra cotta ornamentation. Its entranceway onto High Street is two stories tall, with stone pilasters. It originally featured columns and a pediment extending into the third story. Its third story has terra cotta ornamentation including pilasters between the windows, semi-engaged columns flanking the windows, and cornices above and below the level. The building's top level, the tenth floor, is the most decorative, with consoles under each window, terra cotta between the windows, and a bracketed and modillion block cornice. The building's first floor exterior and lobby were altered in 1964, renovated for Walker's Men's Store moving in. Much of the building's east facade details wrap around to one single bay on the building's Pearl Street facade, while the other 22 bays are more modestly designed. These bays have a grid of rectangular windows, modest cornices above the second, third, ninth, and tenth floors, and horizontal bands of brick on the third floor. The west facade, on Wall Street, is utilitarian, relatively without ornamentation. The north facade is also mostly bare, save for several windows; part of it is obscured by a building built against it.

== History ==
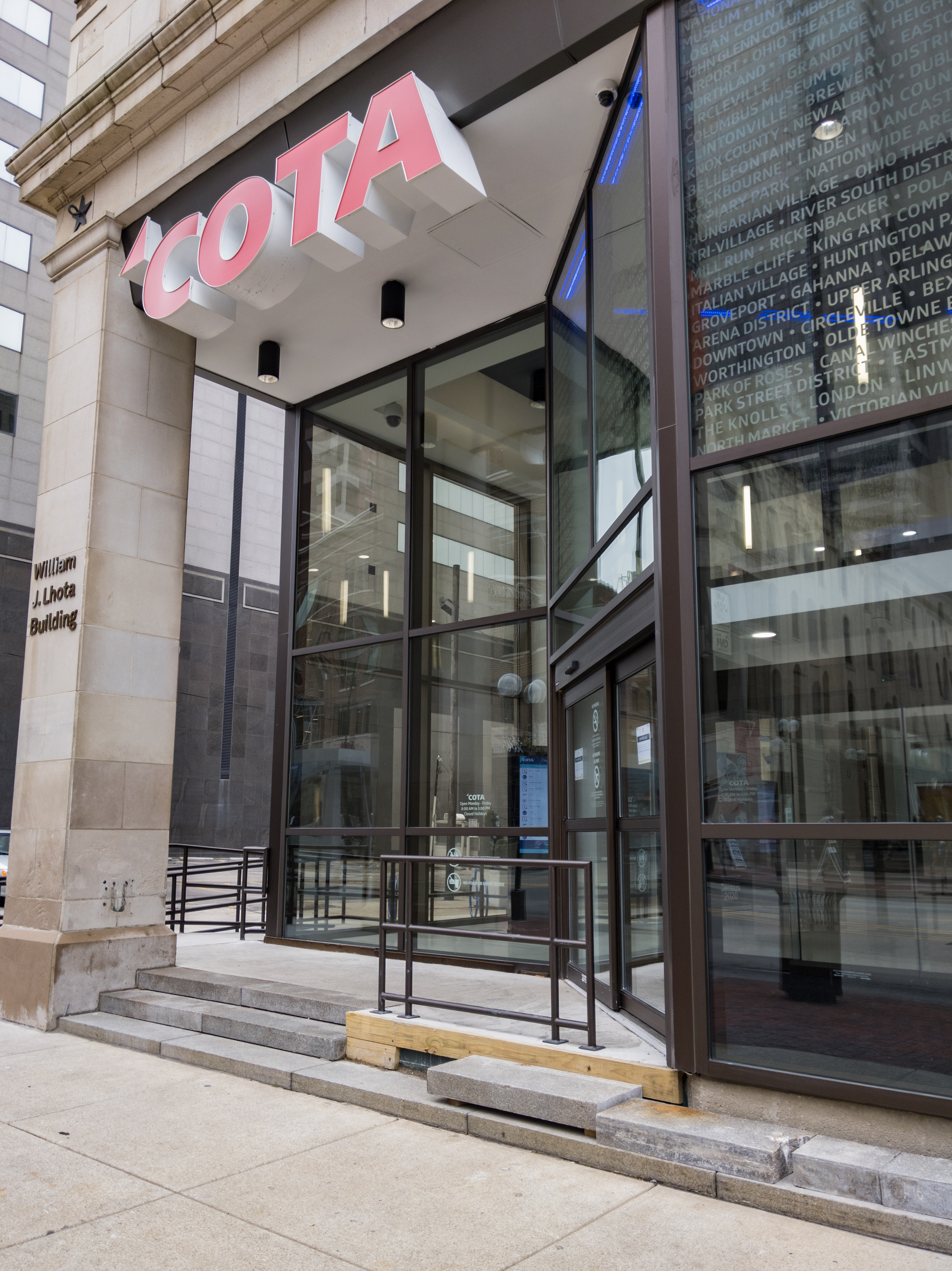
The building's first floor after its 2019 renovation

The Lhota Building was built in 1905. It was associated with many of the city's leading businessmen, as its directors included Nicholas Schlee (president of the Schlee Brewing Company), W.H. Jones (president of the Jones Witter Company), and James Kilbourne (president of the Kilbourne and Jacobs Manufacturing Co.). Around 1919, the building also housed the home offices of the Ohio State Life Insurance Company. Around the 1930s, the retail shop Kibler Men's Clothing occupied the first floor, which was then occupied by Walker's Men's Store from the early 1950s into the mid-1980s. The building's upper floors had several small professional offices. For a time, the building contained the headquarters of the Ohio Republican Party, and the office of noted Columbus architect David Riebel. The entire building was taken over by the URS Corporation in the late 20th century. COTA began searching for a new headquarters as their McKinley Avenue offices reached capacity. The agency purchased the building in 2008, and renovated it, giving it new floors, finishes, and workstations. Lighting, HVAC, and mechanical systems were also updated. COTA's ticket office and its operator sign-in station were also moved to the building, from their former location on Capitol Square at 60 E. Broad Street. The building was named for Lhota, COTA's former CEO, in 2012.

From July to November 2019, COTA renovated the first-floor lobby and information desk into a "customer experience center", at a cost of $2.3 million. Aiming to attract more riders inside, the agency installed a large overhead screen describing fares and COTA services, along with touch-screen information kiosks, digital ticket machines, and a new high ceiling and bright lighting. The renovation also included exterior work: improved accessible ramps, new doors, and windows.
