= LinkUS =

LinkUS is a transportation initiative in Central Ohio, United States. The project aims to create approximately five rapid transit corridors to support the metro population of Columbus, the capital and largest city in Ohio.

The initiative was announced in 2020 to create high-capacity rapid transit in Central Ohio. The initiative is a collaboration between the Central Ohio Transit Authority (COTA), the City of Columbus, and the Mid-Ohio Regional Planning Commission. The initiative will also aim to create jobs as well as transit-oriented developments. It will begin its focus on Columbus's northwest corridor, and then to an east–west corridor consisting of Broad and Main Streets. City officials aim for projects like Indianapolis's Red Line (a bus rapid transit line).

== Northwest Corridor ==
The first planned rapid transit line, the Northwest Corridor, will be built on Olentangy River Road, which follows the Olentangy River northwest from the Arena District and Downtown Columbus. In Downtown Columbus, it will follow Long and Spring Streets to the COTA Transit Terminal on Rich Street. The route connects numerous medical offices, corporate buildings, and entertainment centers. Notable among these are OhioHealth, the Ohio State University, Lennox Town Center, and the Astor Park development by ScottsMiracle-Gro Field. The route may also connect to Dublin, Ohio.

As opposed to the CMAX bus service, the bus line will aim for "true" bus rapid transit amenities, including dedicated traffic lanes, pedestrian-friendly features, and shelters with fare machines for fast boarding.

Federal funding was announced for the northwest and east–west corridors in November 2020, to be released in 2023 and 2024.

In February 2021, after considering light rail and BRT for the rapid transit route, LinkUS chose BRT. It cited a lower construction and operation cost while maintaining many benefits of light rail.

In June 2021, the design process started as the city approved a $4.5 million contract to TransSystems Corp.; $3.75 million of this is from COTA and the rest is contributed by the city. COTA and city officials want construction on the line to start by the end of the decade; first they will apply for federal funds, a process that can take years. The project will be split into three phases, with the first phase of the route running from Downtown Columbus to Bethel Park & Ride and later phases going into Dublin.The other two planned lines are now planned to open before this one.

== West Broad Corridor ==
The West Broad Corridor, now the first bus rapid transit line scheduled to open, will run from Long Street in Downtown Columbus to a new transit center at Rockbrook Crossing Avenue in Galloway along West Broad Street.

== East Main Corridor ==
The East Main Corridor, the second bus rapid transit line scheduled to open, will runs from the Spring Street Terminal in Downtown Columbus to Eastwood Drive in Reynoldsburg along East Main Street.

== See also ==
- List of bus rapid transit systems in the Americas
- List of transport megaprojects
