= Central Ohio Transit Authority =

Public transit operator in Columbus, Ohio and vicinity

Coordinates: 39.962453°N 82.999294°W

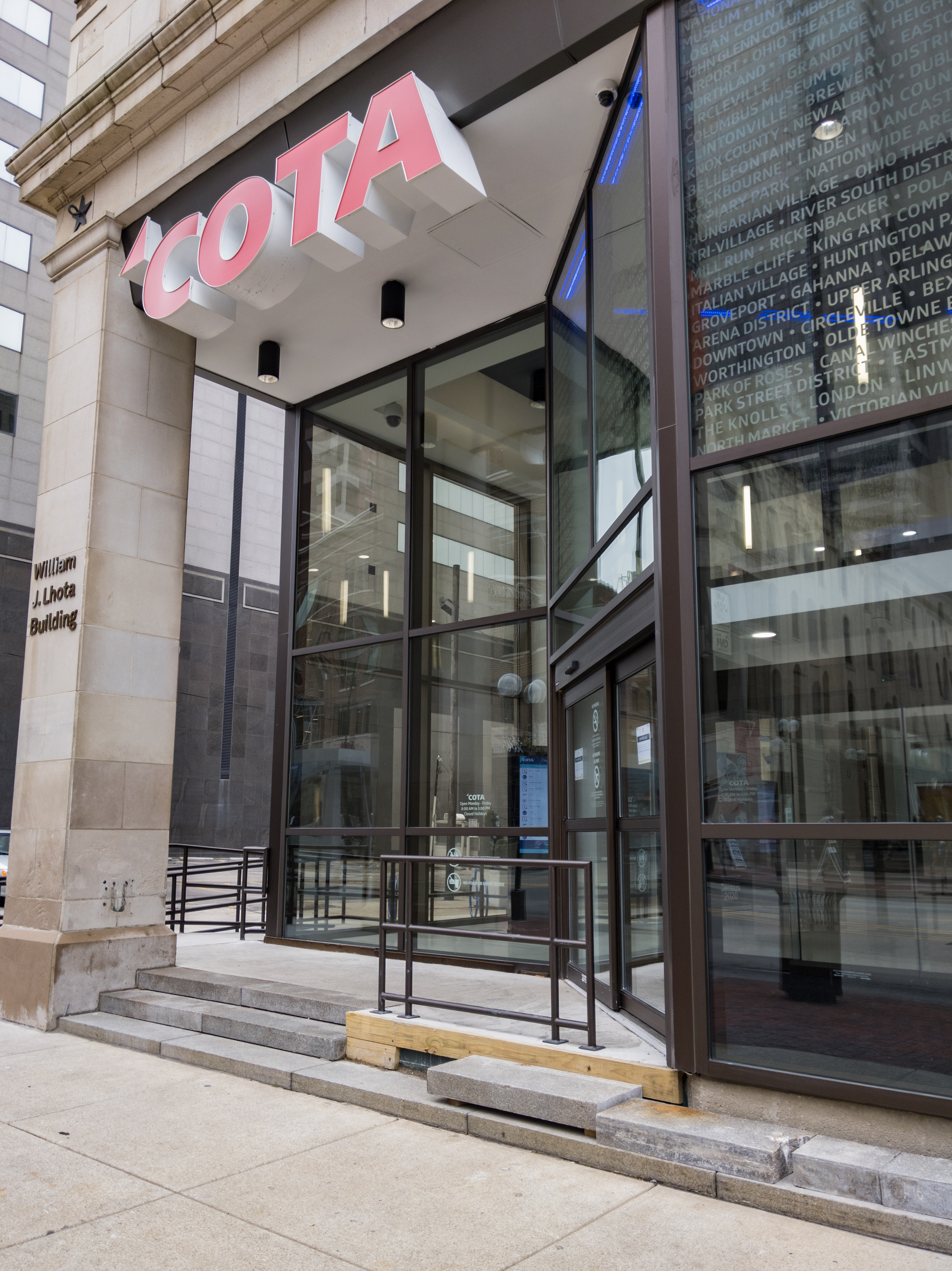
- Customer Experience Center, part of COTA's headquarters
- Founded: January 1, 1971
- Headquarters: 33 N. High St, Columbus, Ohio
- Service area: Franklin County and portions of Delaware, Fairfield, Licking, and Union counties
- Service type: Bus service, bus rapid transit, microtransit, paratransit
- Routes: 41 (24 active; list of routes)
- Stops: 3,041
- Stations: 6
- Fleet: 492
- Daily ridership: 41,100 (weekdays, Q2 2026)
- Annual ridership: 12,593,600 (2025)
- Fuel type: CNG, Battery Electric
- Chief executive: Monica Tellez-Fowler
- Website: www.cota.com
Map of bus routes (2020)

The Central Ohio Transit Authority (COTA /ˈkoʊtə/) is a public transit agency serving the Columbus metropolitan area, headquartered in Columbus, Ohio. It operates fixed-route buses, bus rapid transit, microtransit, and paratransit services.

COTA's headquarters are located in the William J. Lhota Building in downtown Columbus. The agency is managed by President and CEO Monica Tellez-Fowler along with a 13-member board of trustees. COTA is funded by a permanent 0.25% sales tax as well as another 10-year 0.25% sales tax.

The agency was founded in 1971, replacing the private Columbus Transit Company. Mass transit service in the city dates to 1863, progressively with horsecars, streetcars, and buses. The Central Ohio Transit Authority began operating in 1974 and has made gradual improvements to its fleet and network. Its first bus network redesign took place in 2017.

The 2010s have also seen noted service improvements, with the addition of the CBUS free downtown circulator, which ran from 2014 until 2020, its AirConnect airport service in 2016, and the CMAX bus rapid transit service in 2018. Amid the COVID-19 pandemic, the agency dealt with declining ridership and staffing, and cut services in response. COTA nevertheless plans to operate several bus rapid transit lines in development in the near future.

== History ==
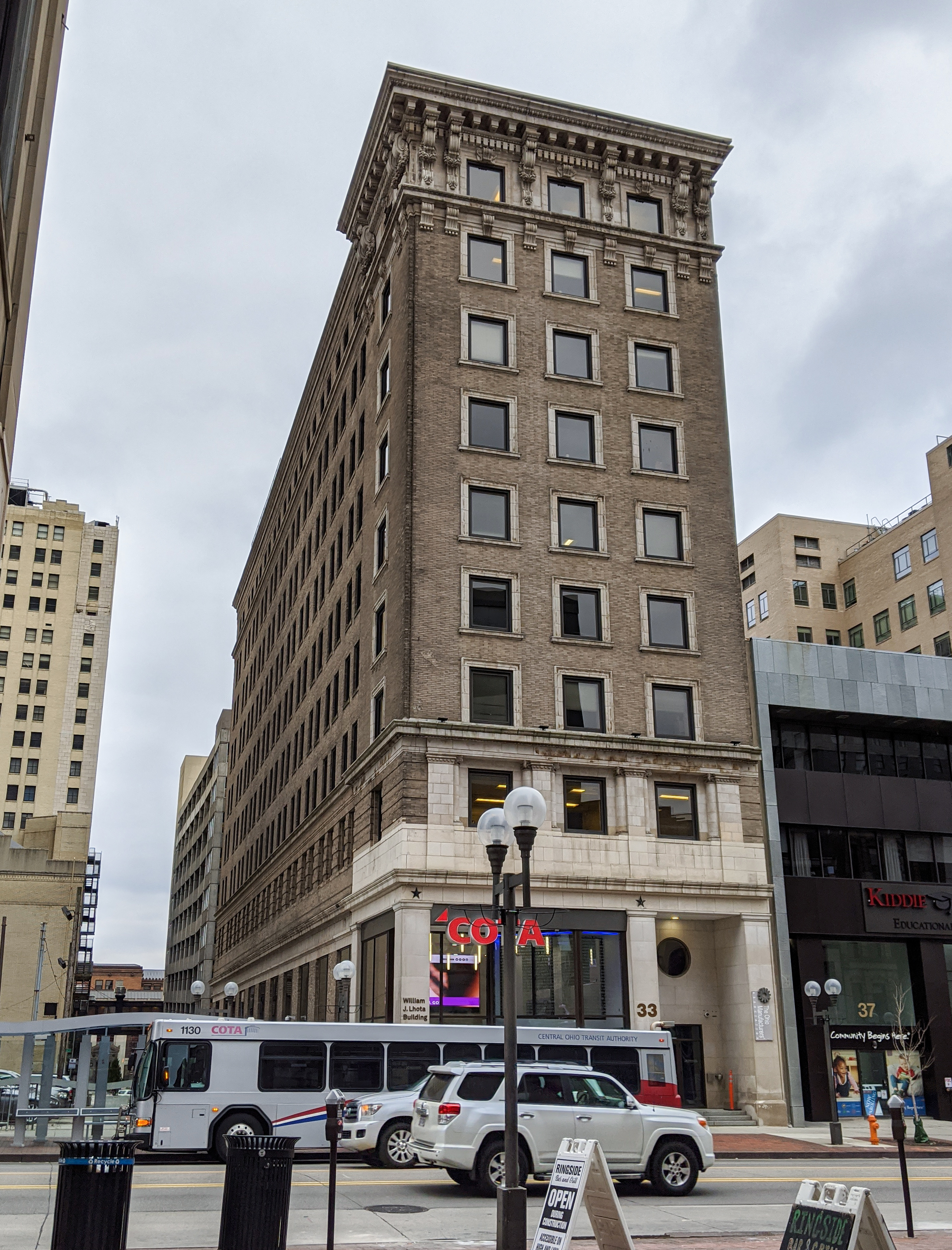
Agency headquarters at the William J. Lhota Building since 2008

Prior to COTA's founding, bus service in the area was managed by the privately owned Columbus Transit Company (CTC). In 1971 the CTC was in the midst of budget problems, so in order to maintain bus service in the area, the local governments of central Ohio created COTA. COTA acquired the assets from the CTC on January 1, 1974, and began operations the same day. COTA acquired the CTC bus service for $4.8 million. In mid-1974 COTA established its Park & Ride program and sets up the first routes at area shopping centers. At that time, cash fares were 50 cents.

In 1975, COTA launched the Key Card program, which provided a discount fare for those passengers with disabilities. By the summer of 1976, COTA had established 50 bus shelters. In 1977, COTA started the Commuter Club that offered unlimited riding for $20 a month. One of the first express bus services, the Beeline, was introduced in 1979 giving passengers a speedy ride up and down High Street. That same year, planning began on COTA's 400,000-square-foot (37,000 m^{2}) operations center on McKinley Ave. In 1992, a 24-hour pass was introduced to allow riders unlimited trips to local and crosstown routes provided by COTA's new lift-equipped buses. From 2007 to 2008, the agency removed all exterior advertisements from its buses, citing diminishing ad revenue and desiring a clean, neat look to the buses.

The agency purchased its downtown office, the William J. Lhota Building, in 2008. Also in 2008, the city of Dublin was added into COTA service areas. In 2016, COTA introduced 4G connectivity in its buses, giving passengers better internet access and allowing for real-time bus tracking to improve communication and efficiency. Real-time bus tracking for passengers began in May 2016 through the Transit app.

On May 1, 2017, the agency overhauled its bus network, the first redesign since COTA's establishment in 1971. The effort simplified routes, increased bus frequency, connected more locations, and reduced bus congestion in downtown Columbus. The redesign doubled the agency's number of frequent lines (from four to eight) and significantly increased weekend service. The project caused a 3.6 percent increase in ridership by May 2018. In August 2017, COTA became the third large transit agency with fleet-wide passenger WiFi. On June 1, 2018, COTA began the C-Pass program, giving employees of certain companies downtown free rides on COTA buses. By 2019, the program enrolled about 420 companies. C-Pass is scheduled to be discontinued on December 31, 2020; property owners will decide whether to fund the program further.

In July 2019, the agency's customer service center at its headquarters closed for renovations. The project involved creating a larger, more inviting space, installing new ticket machines and a large display with transit information, and redesigning part of the building's exterior. The agency opened the new Customer Experience Center in November 2019. In the first "tactical urbanism" project COTA and the City of Columbus operated a temporary busway on Third Street in downtown Columbus from July 22 to August 2, 2019 in an area heavily congested during rush hour. The results were significantly decreased travel times, the average dropping over two minutes from Long Street to Noble Street. The project was inspired by the city of Boston converting a bike lane and on-street parking into a temporary busway. Also in 2019, COTA introduced the COTA Connector system for fare payments. The system includes a smart card that is available for purchase and refills, and a digital wallet through a smartphone app, allowing the use of displayed QR codes to pay when boarding buses.

In 2020, COTA reported 19.1 million riders in 2019, the system's highest ridership since 1988. Ridership had been steadily increasing over several decades, due to rising gas prices, COTA's bus network redesign, and other improvements. In March 2020, as the COVID-19 pandemic began affecting Ohio, ridership dropped approximately 40 percent. COTA introduced several measures in mid-March, including thorough cleaning measures, suspending fare collection, reducing all rush hour lines, and suspending its AirConnect and Night Owl services. On March 20, the agency recommended only using its services for essential travel; two days later it shut down several rush hour services and reduced frequencies of nine crosstown lines. On March 24, it stopped all rush hour services until further notice. On March 26, the agency began "dynamic service" to pick up customers left at bus stops by too-full buses, with bus capacity limited to 20 passengers.

On March 28, a COTA bus operator tested positive for the virus. On March 30, COTA suspended service on routes 21, 25, and 35. On April 7, a second driver tested positive for the disease. On the 11th, the agency announced it will require passengers to wear face masks. On April 27, following further route reductions and a third COTA worker testing positive, it announced all late-night and early hours would be cut, making all services only run from 7 a.m. to 9 p.m. Ridership declined, following a national and global trend. On May 2, as a portion of businesses began to reopen, COTA announced it will resume some early-morning services on May 5.

From May 30 to June 8, COTA rerouted service around downtown Columbus due to the city's George Floyd protests. On June 3, the agency gave a statement regarding its police transport activities during the protests. It had been criticized on social media, and responded that it is committed to breaking down institutional racism, and that its police transport role has been longstanding as part of its emergency service roles. The agency noted that it is not transporting arrested protesters as some agencies have been.

In 2021, COTA introduced a new fare system, based on the Transit app, which caps fares at $4.50 per day or $62 per month. The agency is also transitioning to cash-free fares, though it added about 400 retailers in Central Ohio into a network, allowing riders to add cash to their accounts at the retail stores.

In 2023, COTA staff presented their five-year plan to the agency's board. The plan will cost $1.2 billion and will include new rapid transit corridors, regional funding for sidewalks, bike infrastructure, greenways and other related upgrades, new bus routes, additional electric buses, 60-foot-long buses, higher frequency, longer service hours, and additional transit shelters and facilities. Also in 2023, COTA's board approved resolutions advancing the LinkUS project for bus rapid transit corridors.

== Services ==
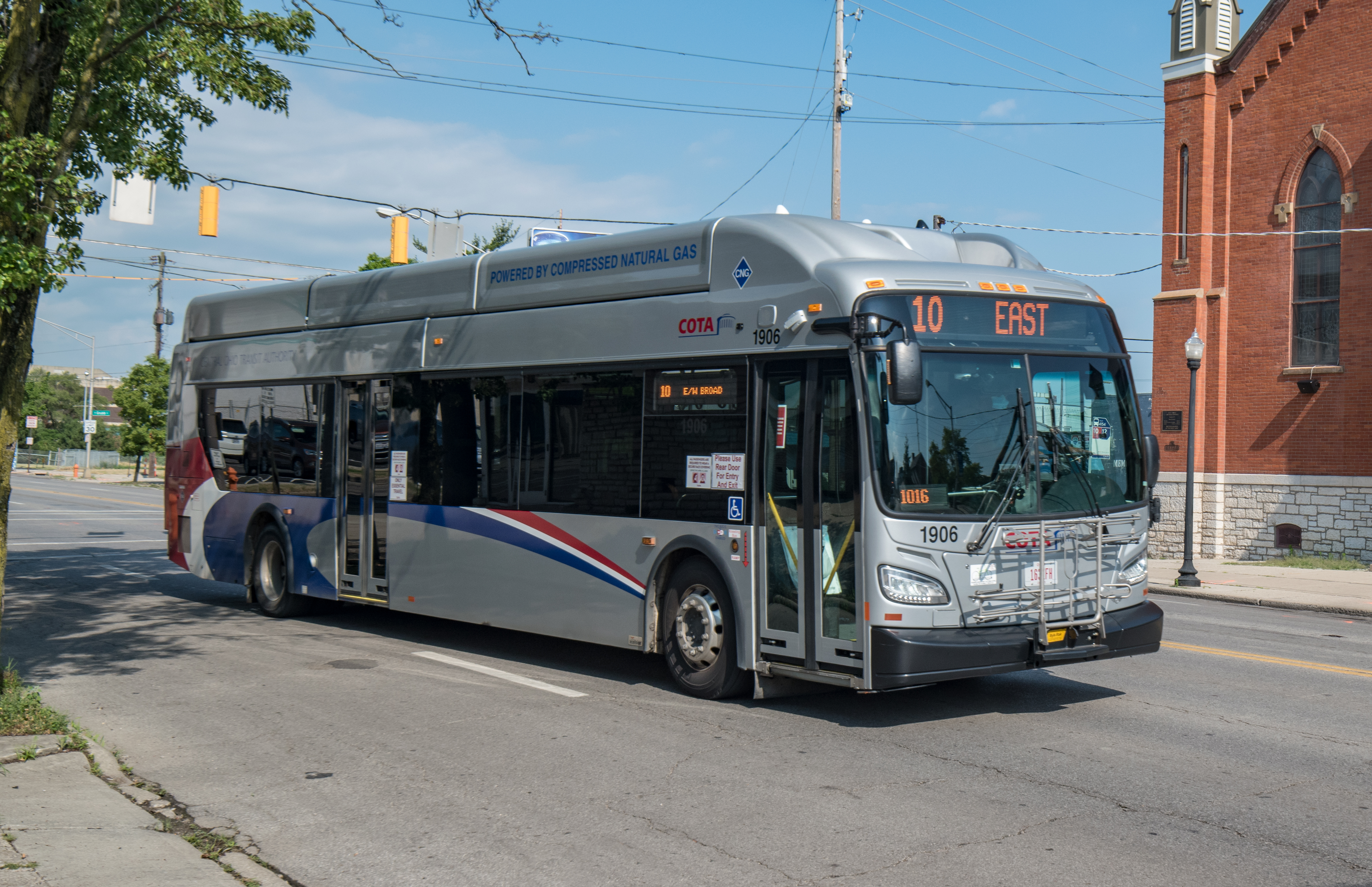
10 E Broad / W Broad, one of the system's most-trafficked routes

=== Special services ===
==== CMAX ====
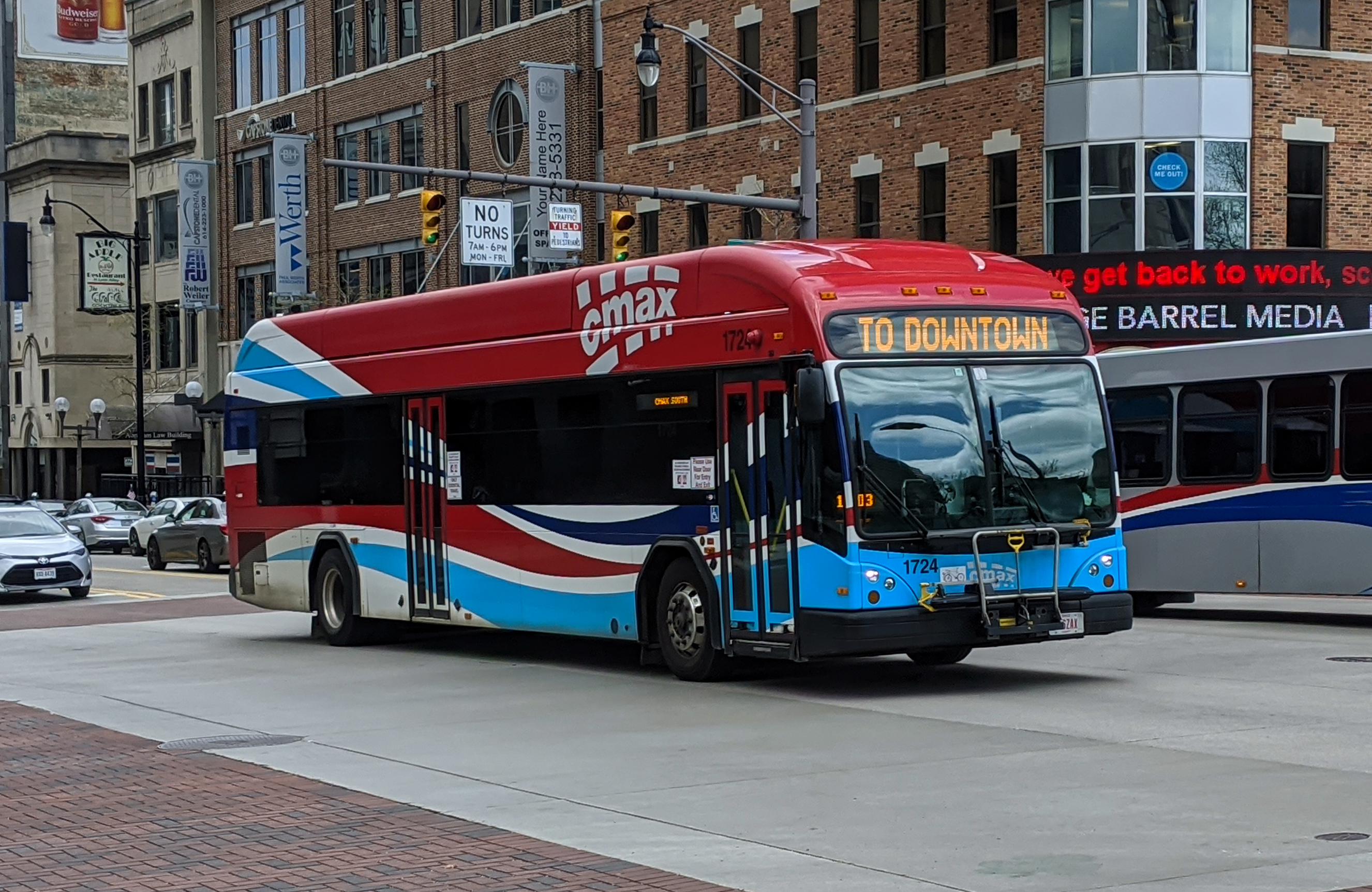
A CMAX BRT bus

CMAX, a bus rapid transit service, runs along Cleveland Avenue from downtown to Westerville. The limited-stop service is estimated to be 20 percent faster than conventional service, using dedicated bus lanes during rush hours, and utilizing transit signal priority. The buses have USB charging ports; the stops have real-time information screens and some feature local art. The service began operation on January 1, 2018.

CMAX was created with $50 million in funding, primarily from the federal government. It was created to help reduce traffic congestion on Cleveland Avenue and bring economic activity to the area in and around Linden, a low-income neighborhood. The BRT line is the most modern in the transit system, with low-floor CNG buses painted red and blue, each with USB ports, and with bus shelters at each stop, many with local art and real-time countdown clocks, displaying the next buses to arrive.

==== CBUS ====
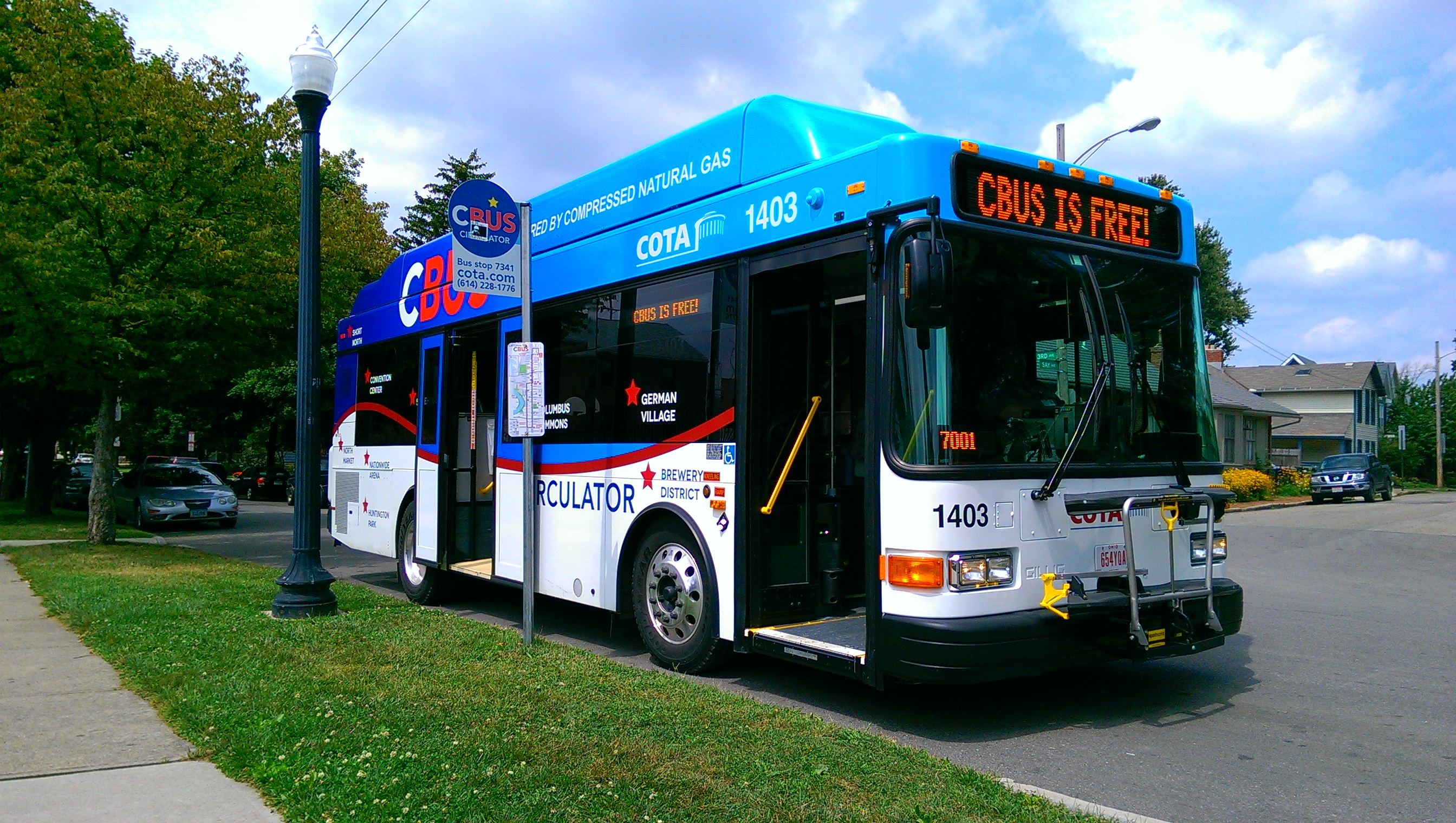
CBUS circulator and signpost

The CBUS was a free downtown circulator traveled along High Street between the Brewery District and German Village north through the Short North. The service had uniquely branded 30-foot buses stopping at round "CBUS" signs. The service operated every 10–15 minutes, seven days per week. The service began operation on May 5, 2014, and was ended in March 2020 during the COVID-19 pandemic. In August 2021, COTA announced that the service will not return.

==== COTA Plus ====
COTA Plus, stylized as COTA//PLUS, is a microtransit service in Grove City and northeast Franklin County. The service enables people to use a mobile app or call COTA's customer service to arrange a trip within service zones created for Grove City and northeast Franklin County. Fares are different than fixed-route COTA services, with single fares at $3, day passes at $6, and weekly passes at $20. C-Pass holders, university students, children, and those with discount IDs receive free or reduced fares relative to their eligibility for other COTA services.

The service was first launched in Grove City in July 2019, and expanded with a three-month pilot to the northeast portion of Columbus and Franklin County in May 2020, following service reductions due to the 2019-20 coronavirus pandemic.

==== Other revenue services ====
- AirConnect offers airport service between John Glenn Columbus International Airport and downtown Columbus every 30 minutes, seven days a week.
- COTA Mainstream is an on-demand shared-ride program for riders with disabilities.
- Seasonal or event-based services include the summertime "Zoo Bus" to the Columbus Zoo, the "Bus it to the Buckeyes" service for Ohio State University football games at the Ohio Stadium, and the "Zoom to Boom" service to the city's July 4 fireworks show Red, White & Boom.

==== Emergency services ====
COTA is directed by the Franklin County Emergency Management & Homeland Security agency to act as the county's primary transportation agency during emergencies. Through this longstanding agreement, on direction from the Franklin County Emergency Operations Center, COTA provides transit for emergency services workers like Columbus police and firefighters, evacuating victims of flooding, fires, and other emergencies, and as a cooling center and warming center for firefighters in emergencies. Recent emergency actions have included transport of police during the George Floyd protests and transit service as an essential operation during the COVID-19 pandemic. In 2012, the agency purchased its first mobile emergency operations center, allowing it to operate alongside and coordinate with other mobile operations centers during crises.

== Operation ==
The agency is headquartered in the William J. Lhota Building in downtown Columbus. COTA purchased the building in 2008, and named it for Lhota, its former CEO, in 2012. The 80,000-square-foot (7,400 m^{2}) building holds administrative offices, a bus operator check-in, pass sales offices, and ticket machines. The building is part of the High and Gay Streets Historic District, on the National Register of Historic Places.

COTA's CEO and President was Joanna Pinkerton until 2024; she was replaced by Monica Tellez-Fowler on May 6, 2024.

COTA's Board of Trustees are appointed for three-year terms by Franklin County, the City of Columbus, and suburbs of Columbus. The 2022-2025 board chair is Marlon Moore, appointed by the City of Columbus.

The agency is staffed with about 1,120 employees, including about 700 operators (bus drivers).

== Bus stops, stations, and facilities ==
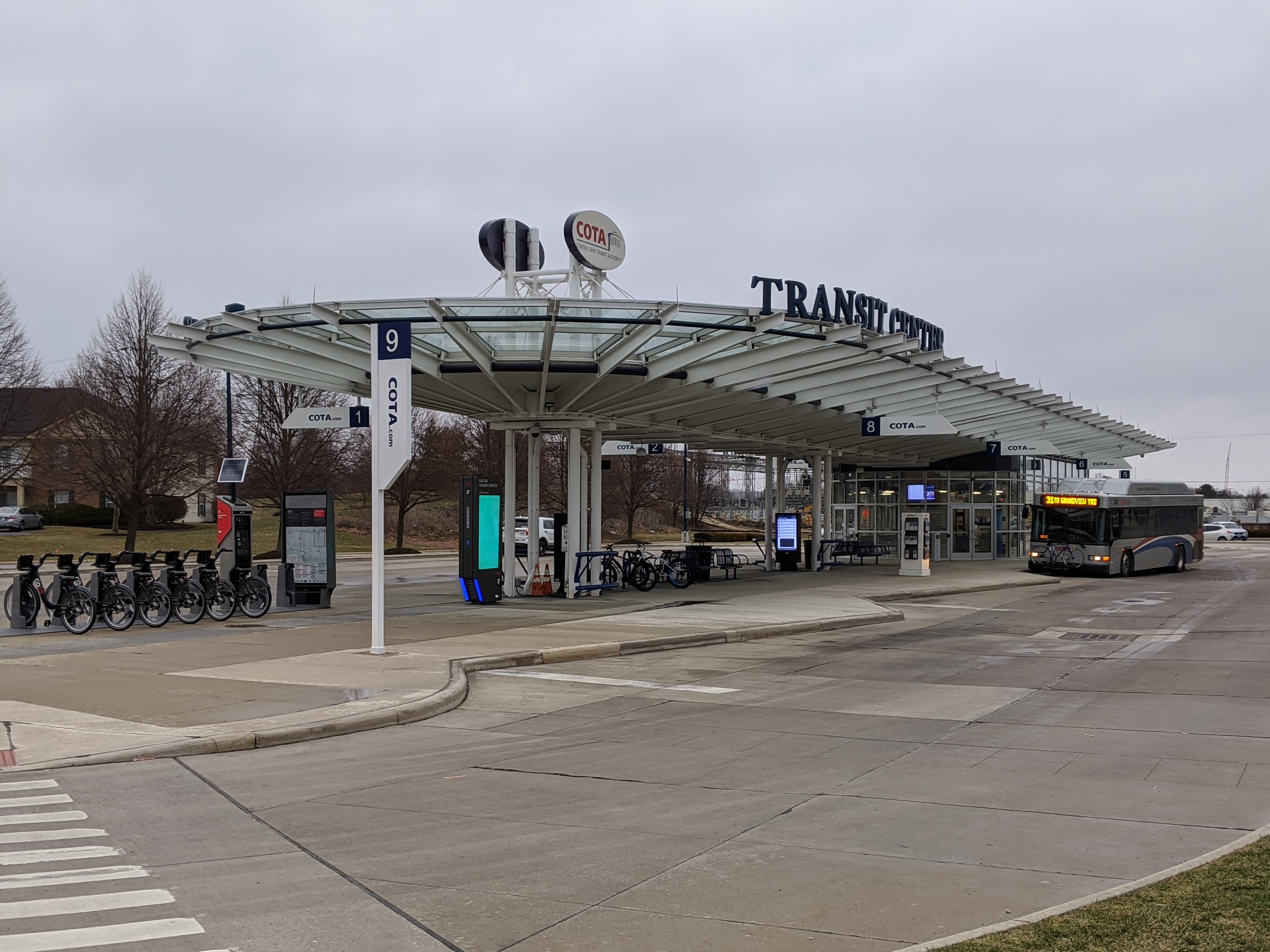
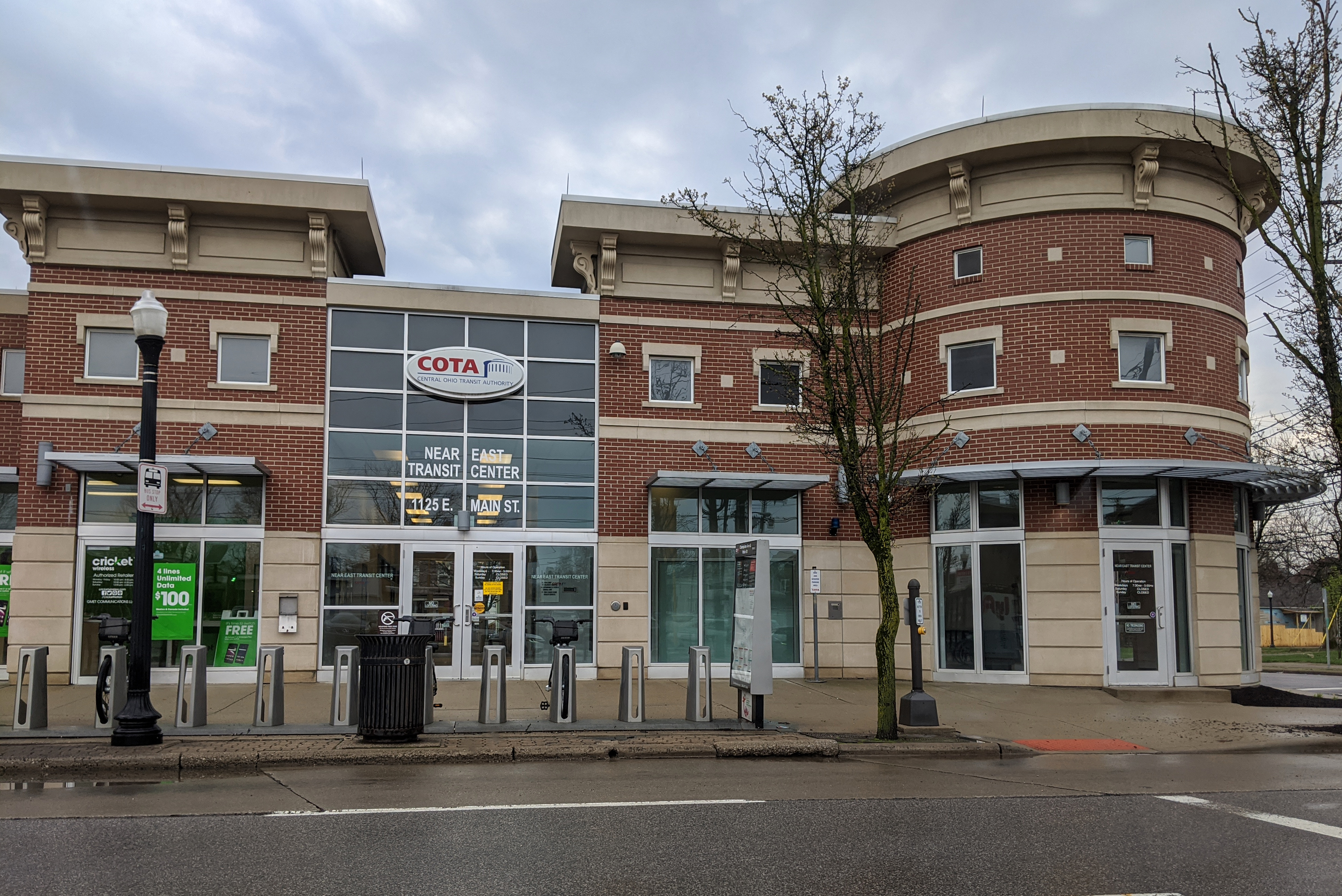
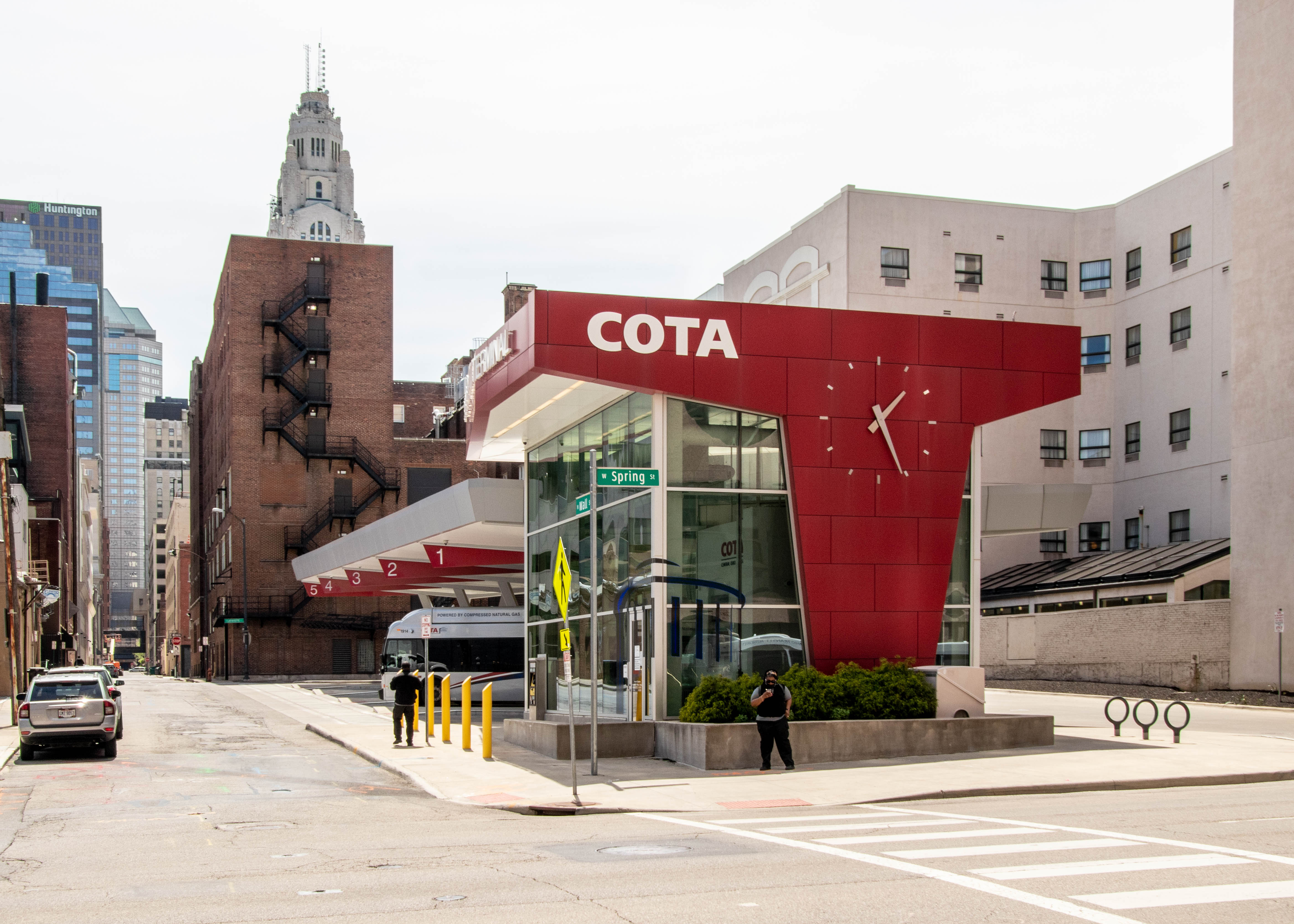
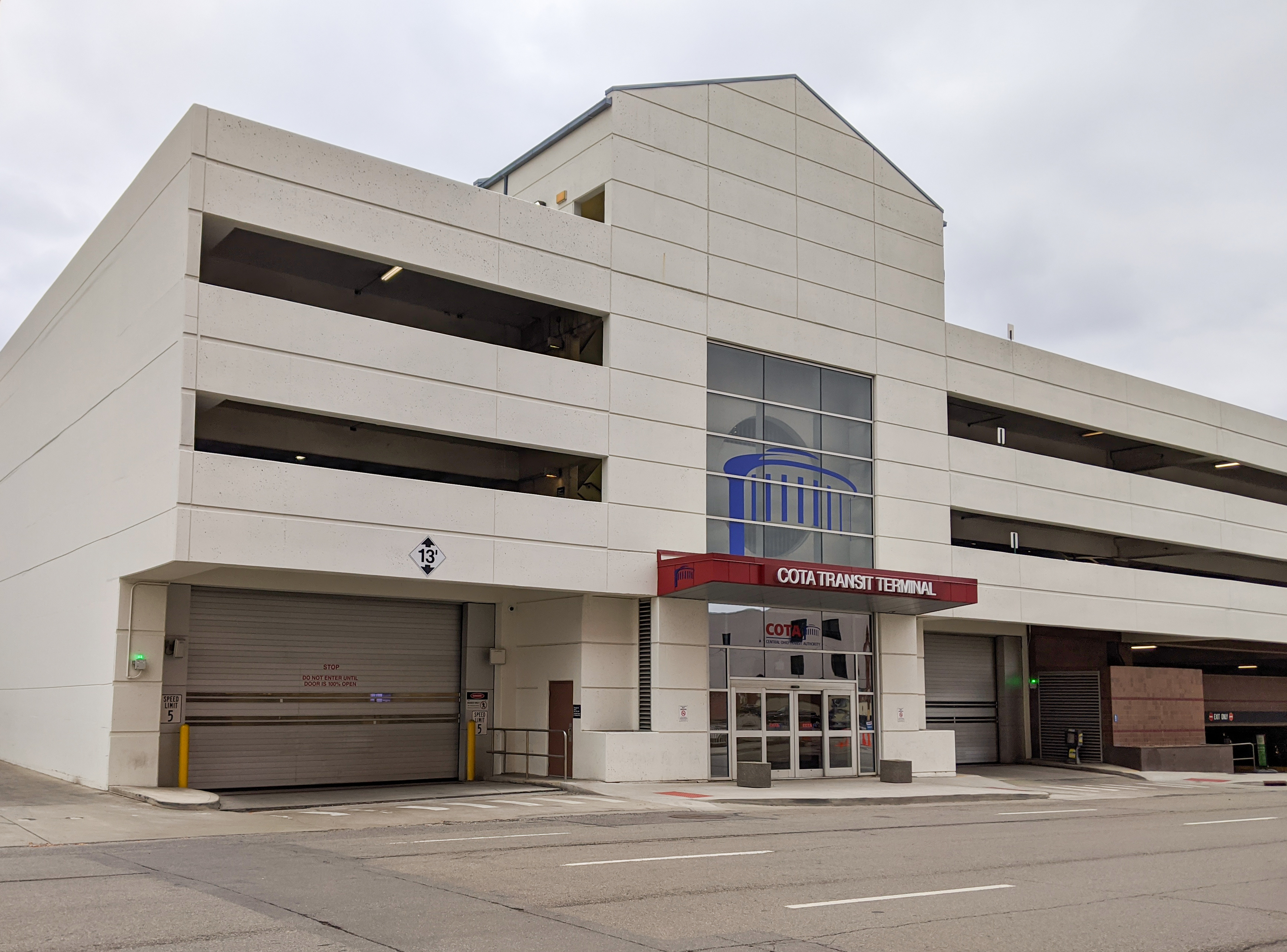
Top (L-R): Easton and Near East Transit Centers
Bottom (L-R): Spring Street and COTA Transit Terminals

The Central Ohio Transit Authority operates 3,500 bus stops, 350 of which have shelters.

The agency operates four transit centers: Easton Transit Center, Linden Transit Center, Northland Transit Center, and Near East Transit Center. It operates two downtown bus terminals: Spring Street (North) Terminal and the COTA Transit (South) Terminal. The agency also operates 25 park and ride facilities.

COTA's Mobility Services Facility is located at 1330 Fields Avenue in Columbus. COTA's Mainstream demand-response program moved into the then-new, sustainable 104,000-square-foot (9,700 m^{2}) facility in January 2011. The paratransit facility houses all of its operations, maintenance, and administration in a single location. The facility cost $21.7 million, with 85 percent of the cost federally funded. The Mobility Services Facility holds 110 paratransit vehicles, 6 vehicle maintenance bays, administrative offices, an eligibility assessment center, one bus wash, and two fueling islands. The building relies heavily on natural light, reducing its dependence on artificial lighting. The building also contains a rainwater harvesting system which captures and stores the water for use by the bus wash and toilets. The landscape was also designed to be low maintenance and to not require an irrigation system. Additionally, the HVAC system was built below-floor providing both heat and air conditioning, which reduces the heat or cool air lost when traveling through typical air ducts.

Gallery

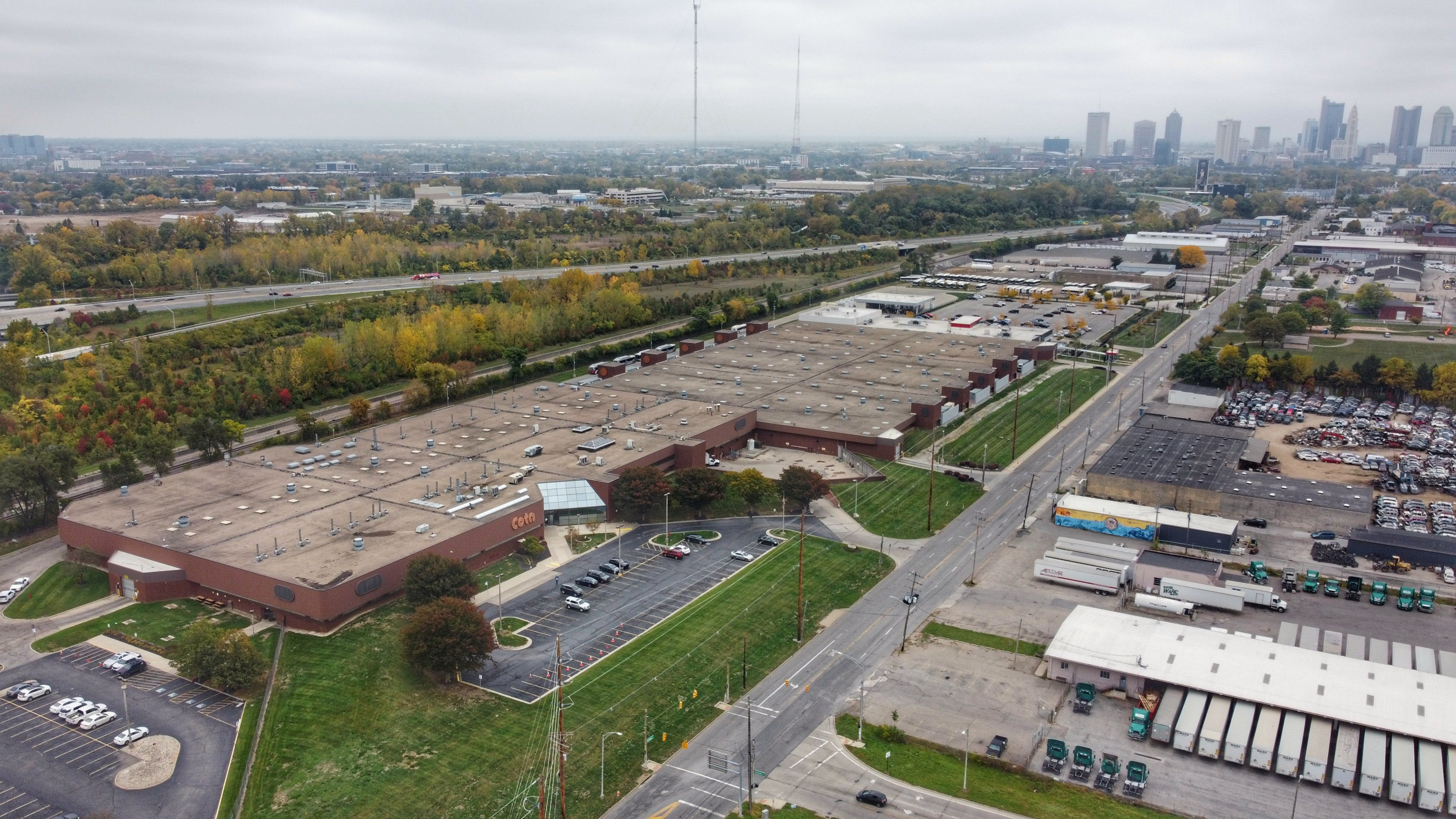
McKinley Avenue Bus and Maintenance Facility

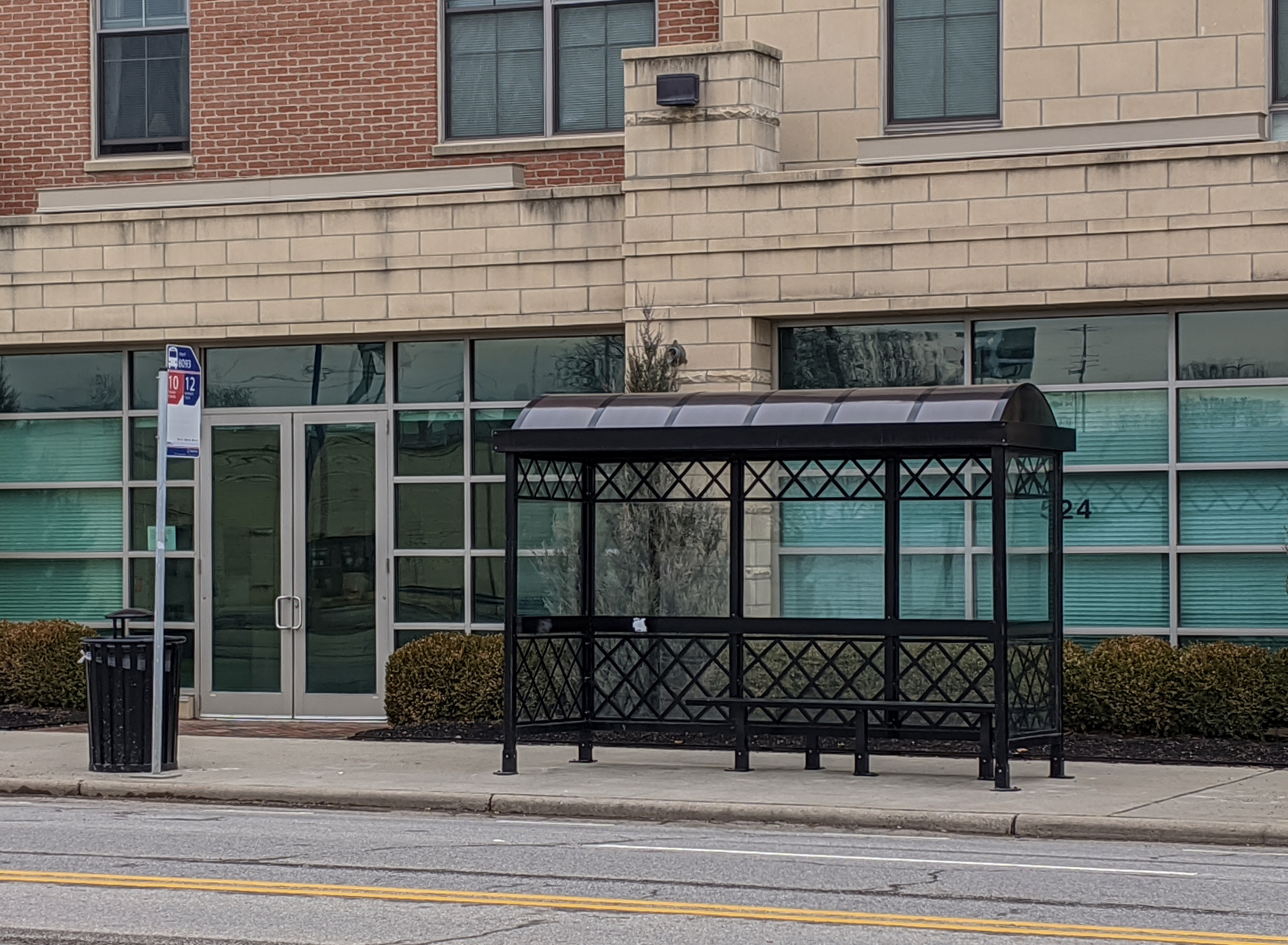
Typical shelter

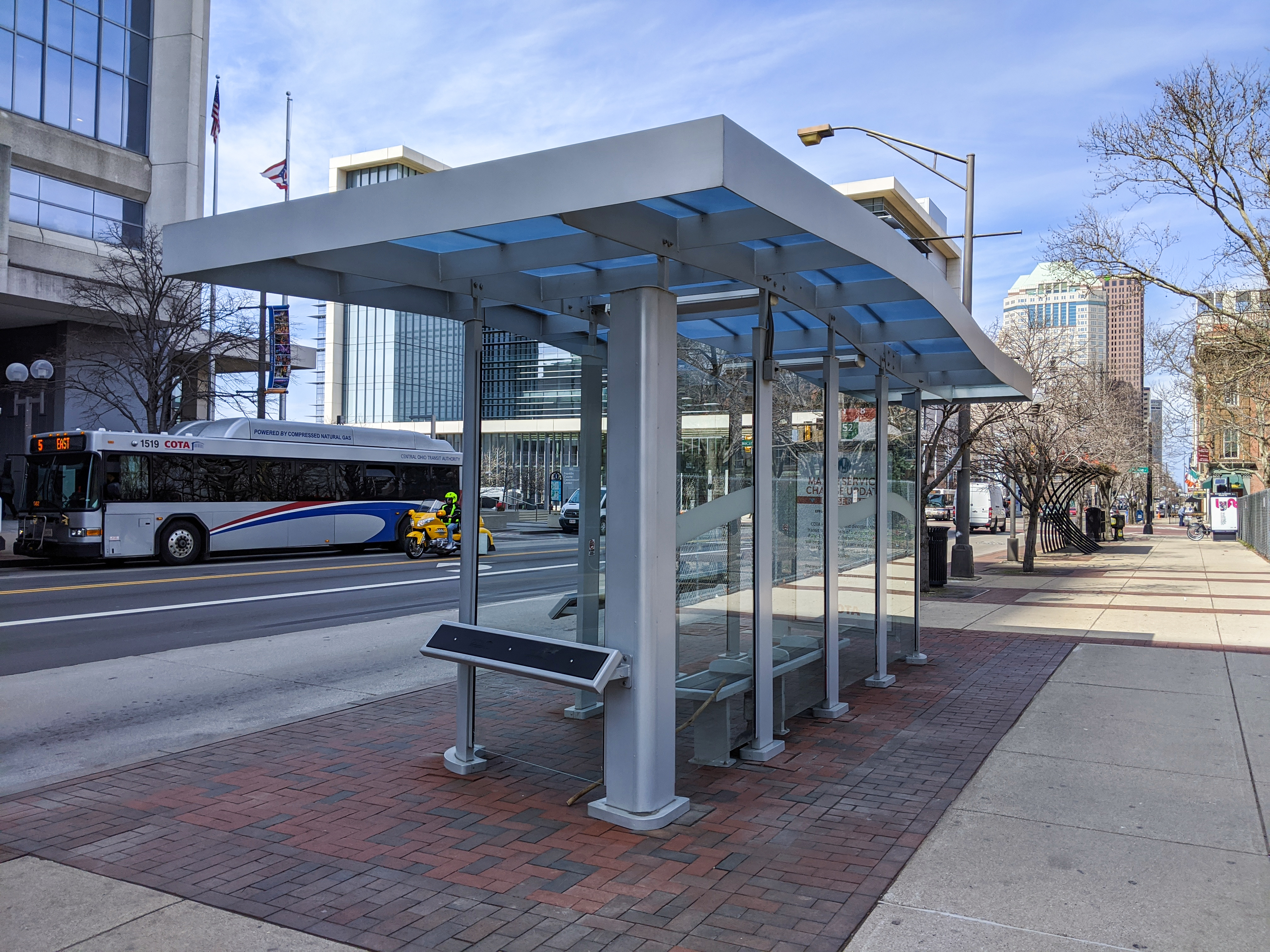
Downtown shelter

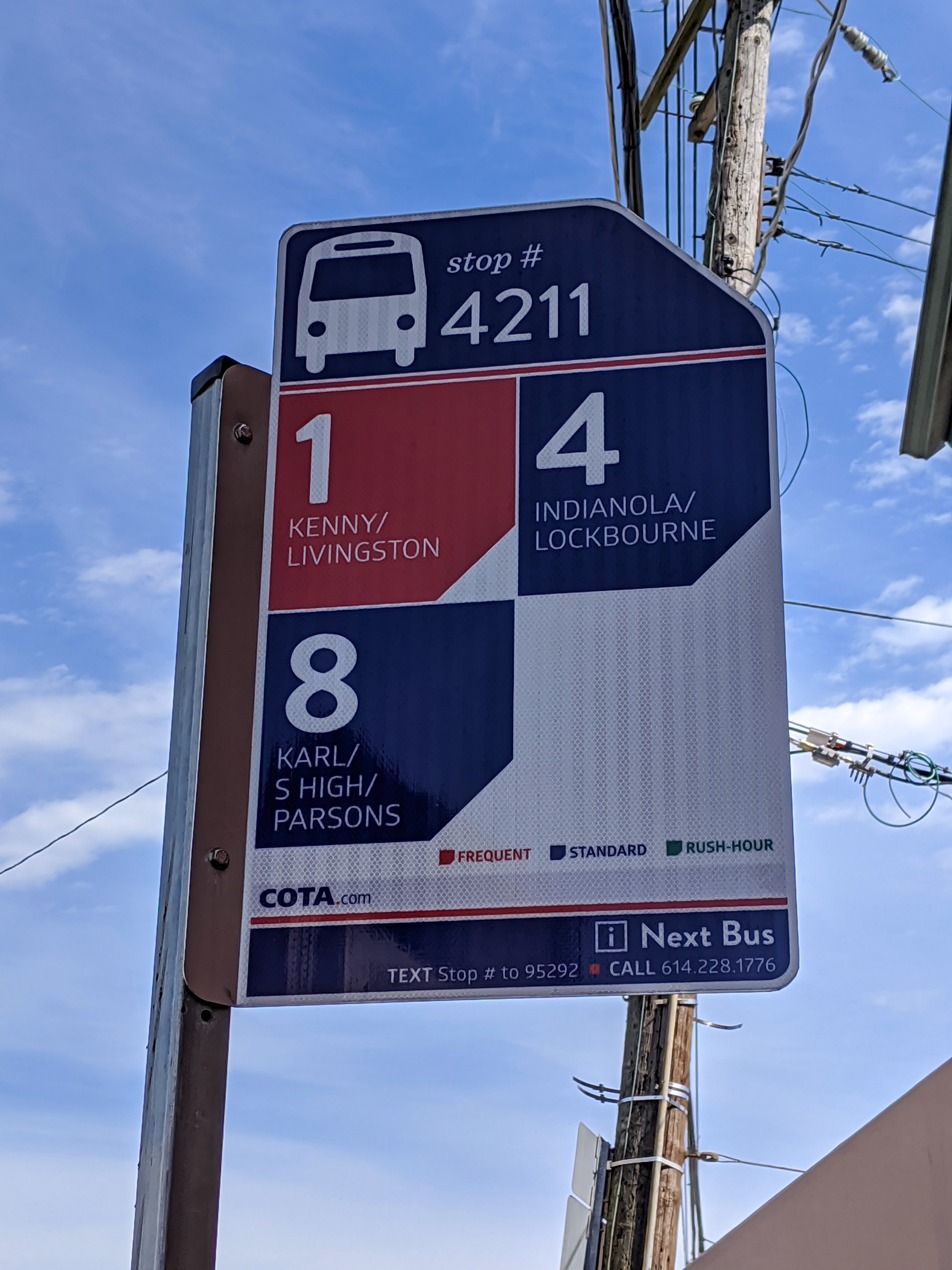
Bus stop signage

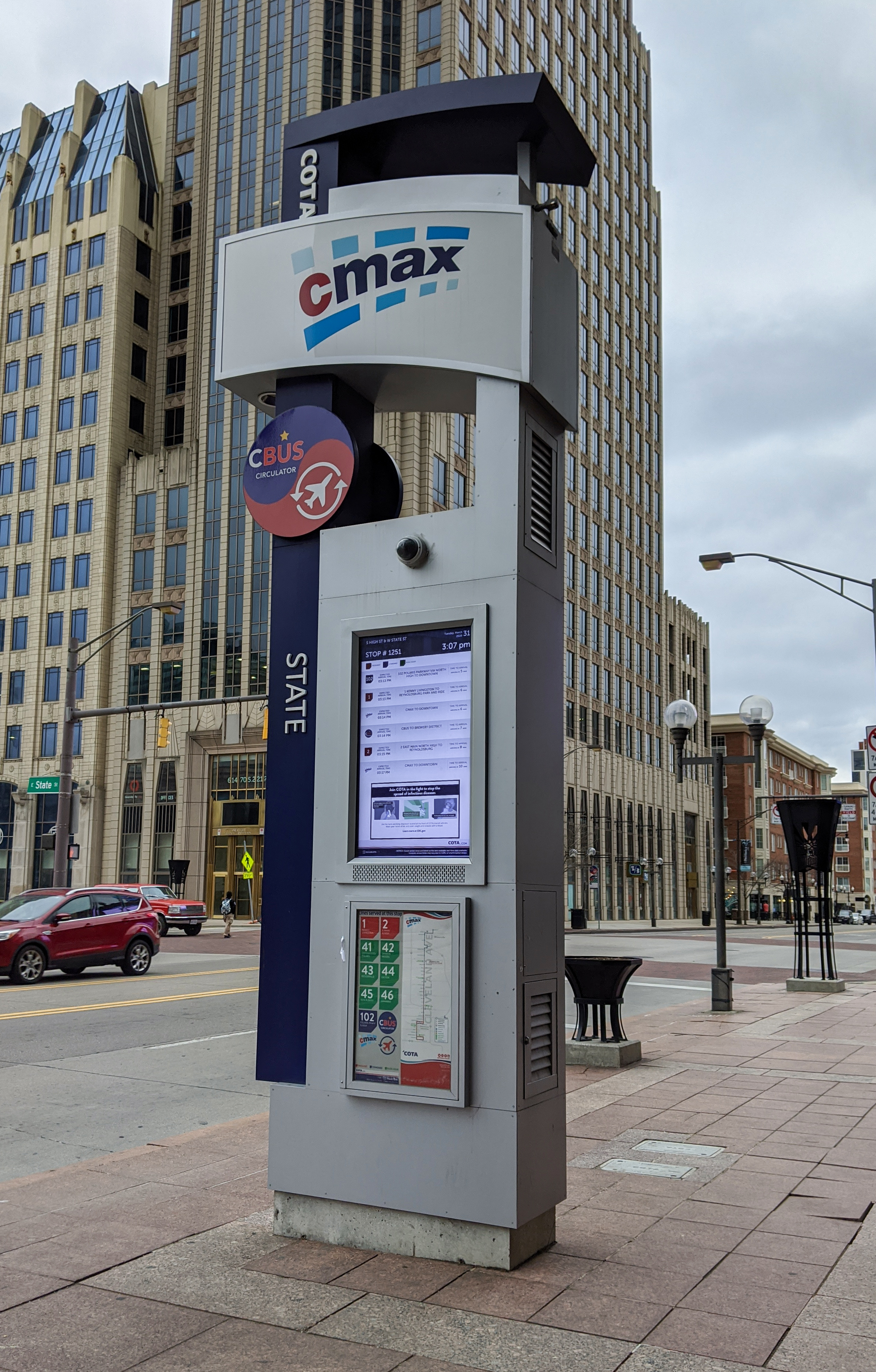
CMAX countdown clock

== Fares ==
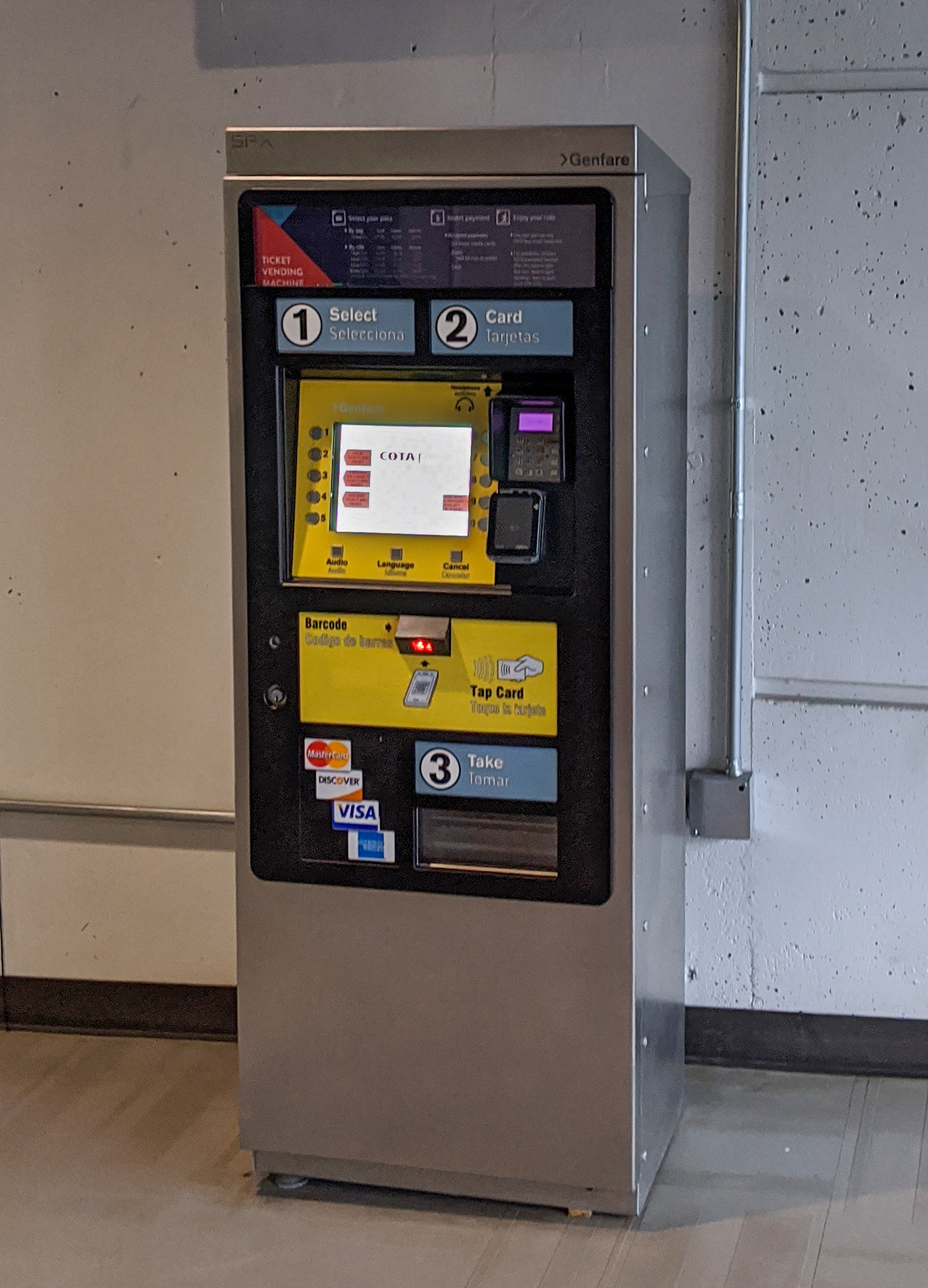
A COTA ticket vending machine

Fares for fixed-route services
Route	Single ride	Transfer Valid for 2 hours	24-Hour pass	7-day unlimited ride	31-day unlimited ride
Regular fares	$2	Free	$4.50	$25	$62
Reduced rate fares	$1	Free	$2.25	Not available	$31

Payment is available on board with exact change, purchased bus passes, a refillable smart card, or through COTA's Connector app. Passes can be purchased at COTA's downtown office, the Spring Street Terminal, John Glenn International Airport, the Columbus State Community College Bookstore, or at supermarkets throughout Central Ohio.

In 2021, COTA is transitioning to a cash-free system, based on the Transit app. About 400 retail stores in Central Ohio are or will be available to add cash to customer accounts. The Transit app has fare capping, so users will not pay over $4.50 per day or $62 per calendar month.

=== Discounted pricing ===
Users of the C-Pass employee program can use a mobile app or dedicated swipe card to board free.

Riders eligible to receive special IDs giving them discount fares include people over the age of 65, people with certain disabilities, Medicare cardholders, and qualified veterans. Children under the age of 12 who are 4 feet tall or taller are eligible for discount pricing. Children below 4 ft (1.22 m) ride for free with fare-paying rider; limit three children.

Students of Ohio State University, Capital University, Columbus College of Art and Design, and Columbus City Schools can swipe their student ID cards to board for free. COTA's summer youth pass is another fare option for people under the age of 17, allowing access to COTA services for the months of June, July, and August for a single $62 fee.

Bus service is free during or after severe snowstorms for the duration of the day, announced when the Franklin County Sheriff declares level 2 or level 3 snow emergencies. COTA bus service has also been made temporarily free during other emergencies, including at the beginning and height of the COVID-19 pandemic.

== Fleet ==
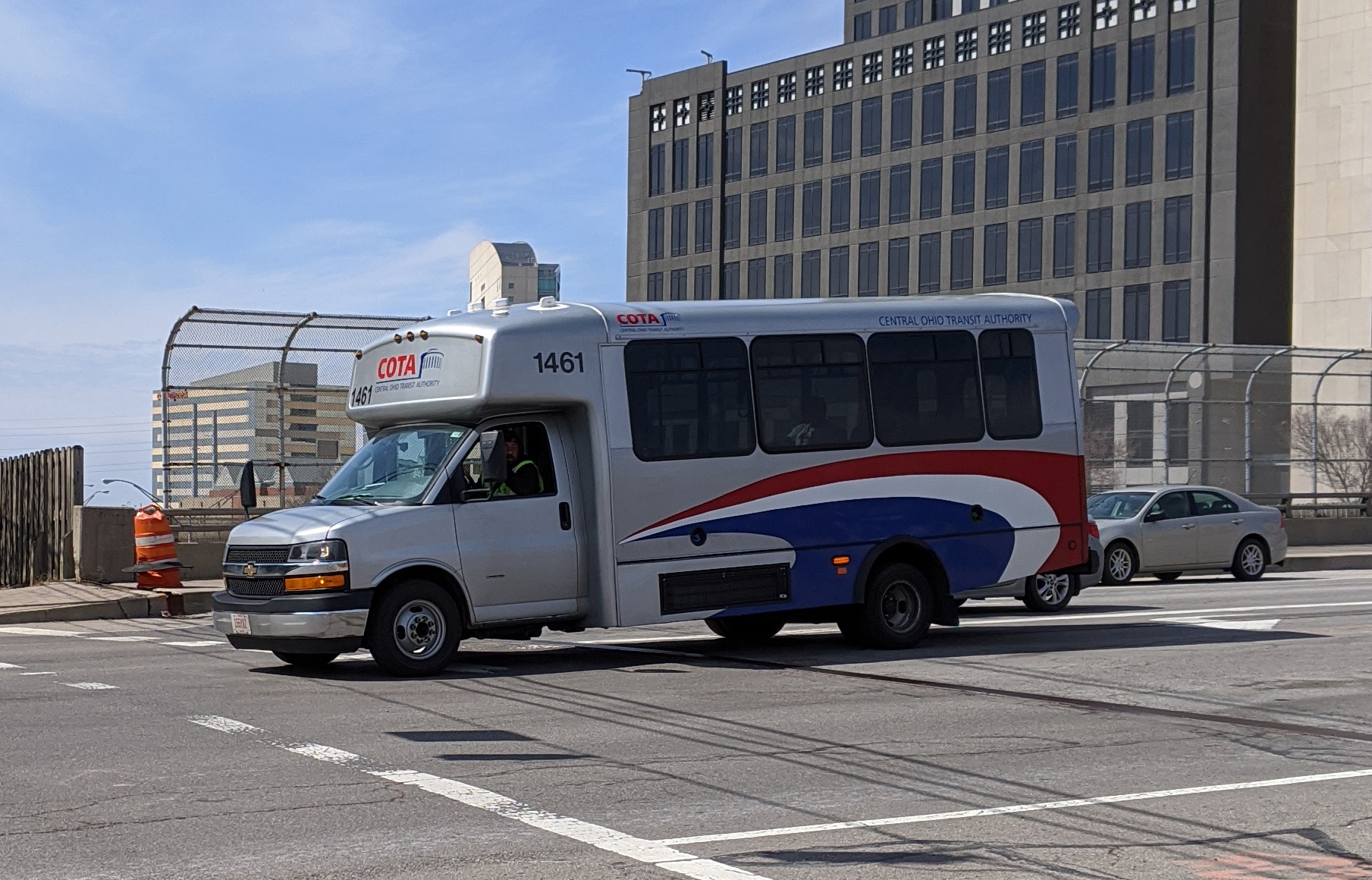
COTA cutaway minibus

A variety of buses make up COTA's fleet. As of 2020, there are 492 vehicles in operation: 212 hybrid or CNG buses, 109 diesel-fueled buses, 12 COTA Plus vehicles, 74 COTA Mainstream vehicles, and 85 COTA Mainstream On-Demand vehicles.

In June 2010 COTA introduced six hybrid buses, which offered a 48 percent increase in fuel efficiency over its diesel buses, a battery-powered electric motor and regenerative brakes that power the battery when pressed, an LED lighting system used inside and outside of the vehicle, and a smoother ride for passengers since the electric motors do not require shifting. Due to rising gas prices at the time, COTA was concerned with reducing fuel emissions, which sparked the addition of the hybrid-electric buses.

In 2011, COTA conducted a study to consider the potential benefits of switching to compressed natural gas (CNG) to power its fixed-route bus fleet. The study compared costs of CNG versus diesel fuel, operational and maintenance expenses, market forces, and infrastructure costs. In keeping with COTA's "Going Green" program, environmental impacts, particularly emissions, were also evaluated. COTA officials also visited and studied other public transit systems operating CNG fleets. In late 2011, COTA made the decision to move forward with the transition to CNG and updated existing plans for the renovation of the McKinley Operations facility to include CNG compatible modifications. COTA completed a $76 million renovation of its McKinley Avenue Fixed-Route Bus Operations and Maintenance Facility. The 400,000 sq ft (37,000 m^{2}) facility is the larger and older (completed in 1974) of its two fixed-route operations facilities.

In May 2013, COTA began operating its first set of CNG buses. The transition to a completely CNG fleet will be a 12-year process that will occur as coaches are retired and replaced, and additional coaches are purchased as part of COTA's ongoing service expansion program. The transition required remodeling with upgrades for CNG at several COTA facilities including a second CNG fueling station at its Fields Avenue Fixed-Route Bus Facility.

== See also ==
- List of bus transit systems in the United States
- Ohio Department of Transportation
- LinkUS
- Smart Columbus
