= Greater Columbus Convention Center =

Convention center in Columbus, Ohio

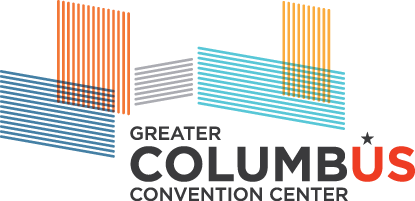

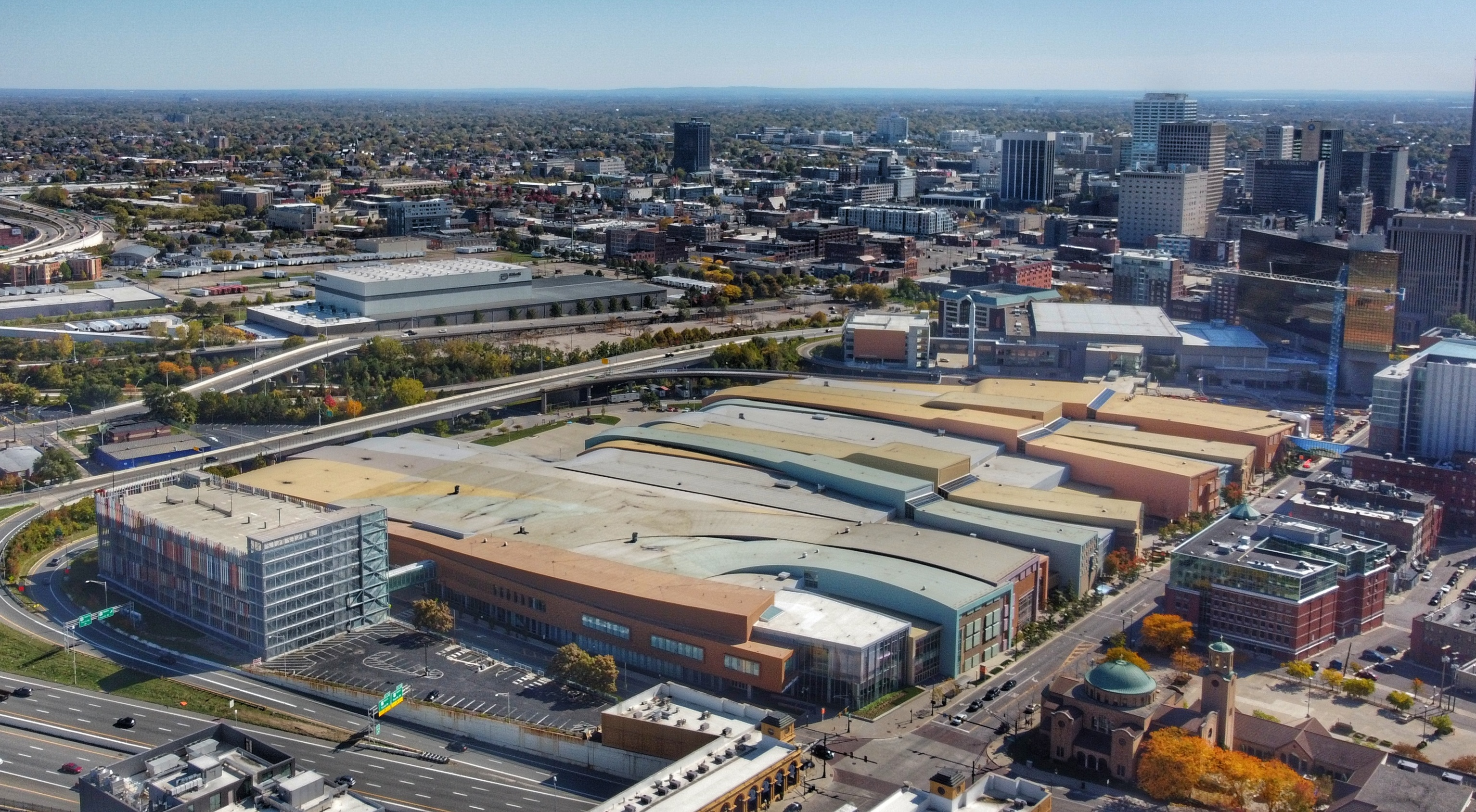
- Interactive map of Greater Columbus Convention Center
- Address: 400 N. High St., Columbus, Ohio
- Coordinates: 39°58′18″N 83°00′02″W
- Owner: Franklin County Convention Facilities Authority
- Operator: ASM Global
- Public transit: 1, 2, 5, 6, 9, 13, 102, AirConnect, CMAX, Night Owl; CoGo

Construction
- Opened: 1993 (Ohio Center in 1980)
- Expanded: 1999 and 2017
- Construction cost: $94 million (not including expansions)
- Architect: Peter Eisenman, Richard Trott, Godwin Böhm NBBJ

Website
- www.columbusconventions.com

The Greater Columbus Convention Center (GCCC) is the primary convention center of downtown Columbus, Ohio, United States, along the east side of North High Street.

The convention center was predominantly designed by Peter Eisenman, constructed in 1993, and expanded in 1999 and again in 2016. Venue management company ASM Global oversees day-to-day operations of the 1.8-million-square-foot (170,000 m^{2}) facility, including 447,000 square feet (41,500 m^{2}) of exhibit space, three ballrooms, and 75 meeting rooms.

== History ==
=== Ohio Center ===
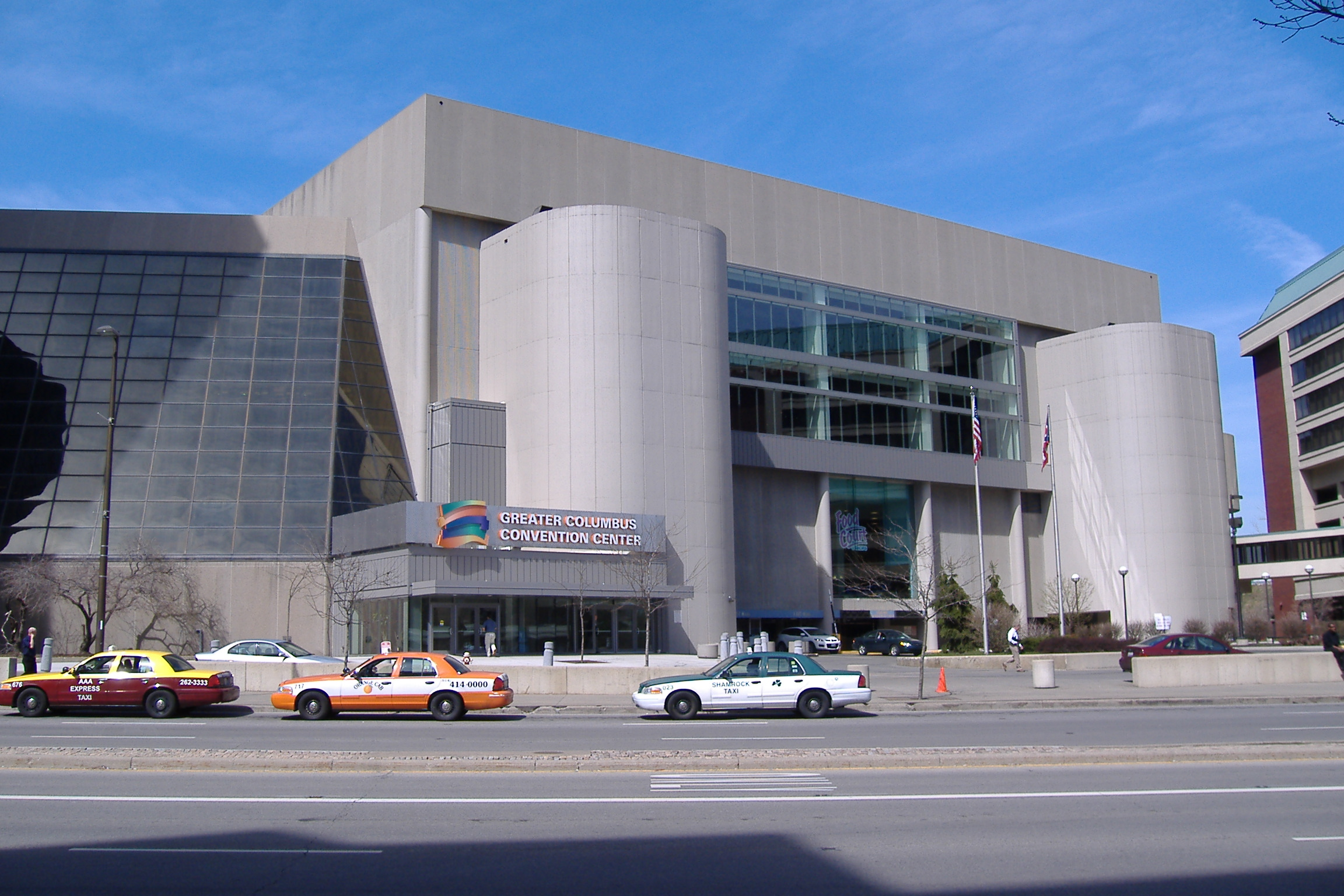
The Ohio Center, now the South Building of the GCCC

The convention center was conceived in 1969 as a way for the City of Columbus to generate economic revenue by hosting events and revitalize the downtown area after a period of decline. Voters approved a $6 million bond in 1971 to purchase 27.5 acres (11.1 ha) which was the site of the first Union Station in the world. Construction was later delayed as the city secured the land, demolished the arcade of Union Station, and changed the building's plans. The station's demolition faced criticism from agencies and the public, with little to no news of the demolition publicized until it occurred, and the demolition followed improper procedures. Funding construction remained an issue and Battelle Memorial Institute stepped in with a large donation and appointed Battelle official Clyde Tipton Jr. to lead the project.

The groundbreaking ceremony was held on February 3, 1978. The Ohio Center (containing Battelle Hall on the third floor) opened in September 1980 with 700,000 square feet spread over five stories with 60,000 square feet of open exhibit space and 30,000 square feet of balcony area. The building was designed by Godwin Böhm NBBJ. Almost immediately, issues were found in the use and amount of space and city officials began plans for a second convention center. Committees to study the use of the building and propose recommendations were formed in 1985 and 1987 but voters rejected both proposals.

=== Eisenman addition, 1989 ===
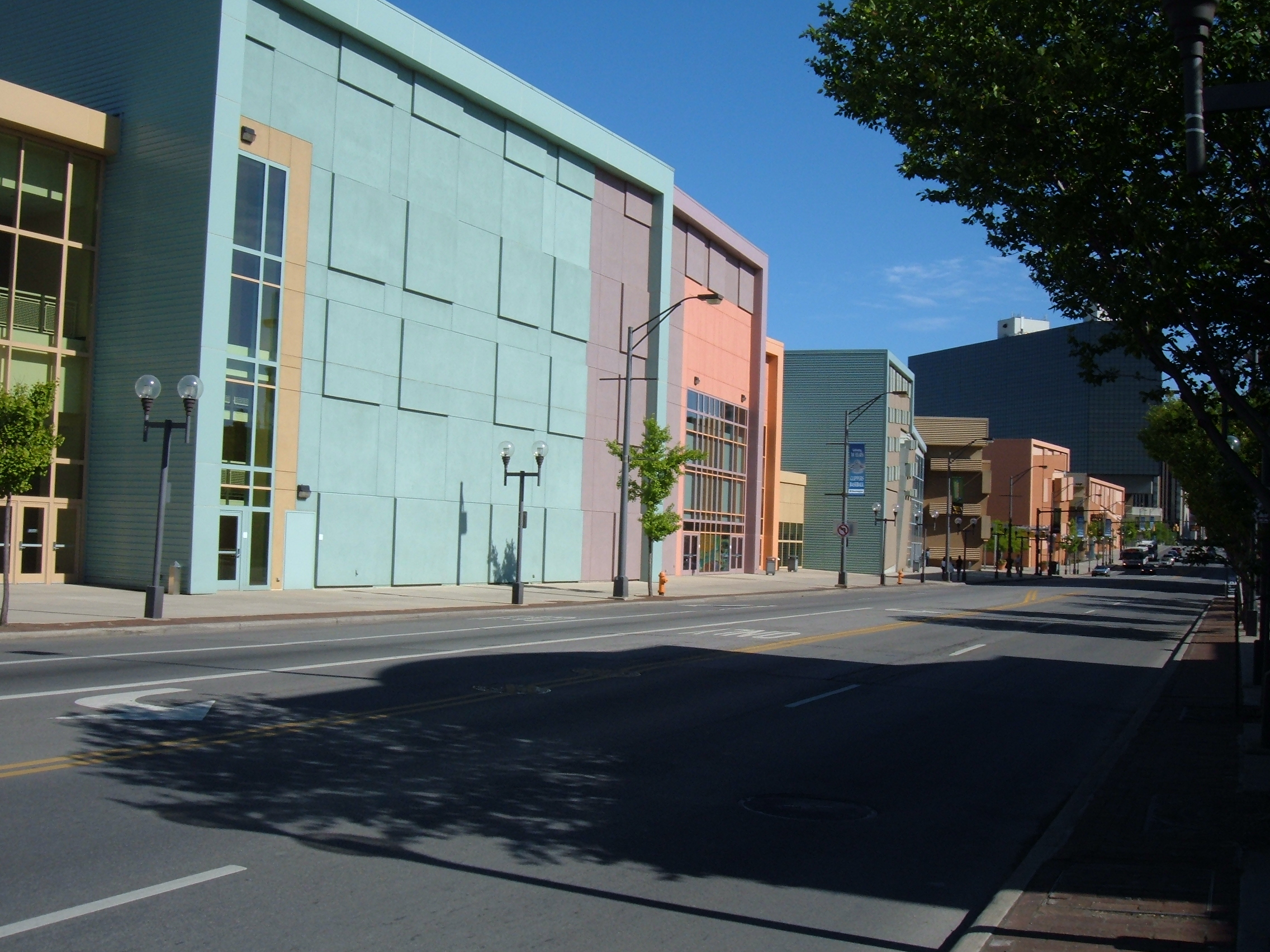
The Columbus Convention Center west facade facing High Street

In 1989, a final survey and proposal were completed that voters approved. The plan called for a hotel-motel tax to fund the $80 million building that included a 300,000-square-foot exhibit hall.

Architects of the building, Peter Eisenman and Richard Trott, were selected through an international design competition. Other entries in the competition included Acock Schlegel Architects, Michael Graves, John E. Foster and Associates and Holt Hinshaw Pfau Jones, and Homer Tritt Associates and Arup. Eisenman's design was seen as exciting to the jury and reminiscent of the railroad tracks the building was to be built on. Its avant-garde design of the building was also intended as a lure for conventions and trade shows and anchor the revitializing Short North neighborhood.

When the 580,000-square-foot building opened in March 1993, it cost $94 million. On Saturday, March 13, 1993, the building was dedicated and opened to the public. Its opening coincided with its first show, the Columbus International Auto Show. In 1996, the Franklin County Convention Facilities Authority took ownership of the Ohio Center to streamline operations and planning between the center and GCCC.

=== Expansions and renovations ===
In 1999, a $77 million expansion began. The 250,000 square feet expansion to the building was completed in 2001 at the cost of $85 million. More parking was created along with a renovations of amenities and the south building.

Early January 9, 2008, a 1930s-era water main broke and flooded the entire length of the Main Hall. Officials from the Columbus Division of Fire were concerned that part of the building, including the main hall, might collapse due to structural failure. It was soon determined, however, that the building was not in any danger. The SMG-managed Greater Columbus Convention Center reopened for business as usual the morning after successfully restoring the north facility to regular conditions in the aftermath of a 16-inch water-main rupture at Swan and High Streets. Water from the break traveled under the building and surfaced within the facility. Once structural engineers inspected the facility and deemed it structurally sound, water removal and restoration efforts began, which involved 150 people, 600 carpet blowers and 75 water extractors. Damage within the facility was aesthetic in nature, requiring primarily the replacement of carpeting and drywall in some areas. The restoration company received a national award for the work performed, which included challenging indoor concrete pours at the site where crews needed to remove the concrete and dig underground to locate the actual point where the water line broke.

In 2014, plans to renovate the building for a cost of $125 million began to take shape. Renovations included the interior of the building, expansion, and total redesign of the north end of the center. The renovations were completed in July 2017.

=== Convention area lodging ===
In 2008, Experience Columbus, the convention and visitors bureau, began to recognize that the city was at a competitive disadvantage due to the lack of hotel rooms which put the city at danger of losing new and old business at GCCC. In 2010, ground was broken for the publicly financed, 532-room Hilton Columbus Downtown to help meet the growing demand for events at the convention center. It opened in 2012 and underwent a $125 million renovation in 2015.

In 2016, Columbus bid on hosting Democratic and Republican National Conventions, losing both. In 2017, Experience Columbus commissioned a "Hotel and Development Study" and found the city has fewer hotel rooms within a 10-minute walk of the convention center than other locations. The survey recommended the expansion of the Hyatt Regency or the Hilton Columbus Downtown to meet the need of a 1,000-room hotel for convention-center area lodging, estimating $22.5 million a year in direct spending. In 2018, the city announced the expansion of the Hilton Columbus Downtown which would add 468 rooms for a total of 1,000 rooms.

== Conferences and events ==
- EcoSummit: Held for the first time in the United States, the 4th International Eco-summit, with the theme of Ecological Sustainability: Restoring the Planet's Ecosystem Services, attracted the world's most prominent ecologists from 75 countries in 2012.
- John Deere: Ag & Turf New Product Intro: Attracting four waves of 1,200 of company representatives each, participants watch 28 different company machines be driven across the stage. They then visit the exhibit hall floor to confer with subject matter experts before traveling to the Molly Caren Agriculture Center in nearby London to take Cropmaster and other specialty harvesting equipment for a test drive.
- NHL All-Star Weekend: The National Hockey League's 2015 Fan Fair was filled with team mascots, dozens of interactive activities, Stanley Cup photo opportunities and multiple player autograph sessions with NHL heroes. The Fantasy Draft highlighted the player selections for Team Foligno and Team Toews. Affiliated hospitality functions preceded the NHL Skills Competition and NHL All-Star Game at Nationwide Arena—home of the Columbus Blue Jackets—across the street.
- The 75th General Convention of The Episcopal Church: Attracting 10,000 international attendees and featuring the election of the presiding bishop, the review of 250 resolutions by the House of Deputies and 200 bishops attending House of Bishops proceedings, this event occurs every three years.
- World Summit on Trade Efficiency: The event, sponsored by United Nations Conference on Trade and Development, the City of Columbus and private-sector businesses, focused on the utilization of information technology to expand international trade.

=== Annual expositions ===
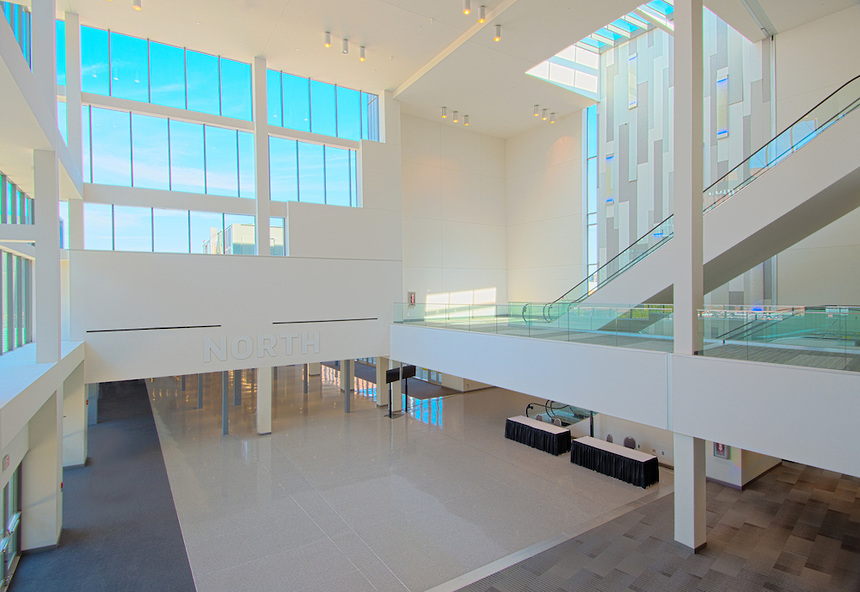
Interior of the facility's Battelle Atrium

- Arnold Sports Festival: founded by namesake Arnold Schwarzenegger and Jim Lorimer, the event held annually during the first weekend in March features more athletes than the Olympics, competitors representing more than 80 countries, the nation's largest health & fitness expo with 900 booths and more than 200,000 attendees.
- Columbus International Auto Show: Hundreds of vehicles from dozens of manufacturers fill four contiguous exhibit halls with cars ranging from Fords to Ferraris and the "Ugliest Car in Columbus" to the concept cars of tomorrow.
- Cultivate – An American Hort Experience: Considered the largest horticulture show in North America, Cultivate offers more than 7 acres of trade show exhibits including technology and new products, services and plant varieties. Thousands of industry professionals from more than 20 countries attend this growing event that is moving up the ranks of the nation's Top 200 trade shows.
- Ohayocon: a three-day anime convention held during January/February in Columbus, Ohio at the Hyatt Regency Columbus and Columbus Convention Center. Ohayocon's name is from the similarity between "Ohio", the convention's location, and Ohayou (おはよう), which in the Japanese language means "Good morning".
- Ohio Star Ball: Growing from a one-day event to the largest professional/amateur ballroom dancing competition in the world, Ohio Star Ball's glitter and grace includes almost 13,000 entries and filming for America's Ballroom Challenge to be broadcast nationally.
- Origins Game Fair: Produced by the Columbus-based Game Manufacturers Association, the premier trade association for the hobby games industry, Origins provides more than 17,000 attendees with the chance to learn about new releases from game creators and manufacturers and buy and play games, including live-auction role-playing games and popular collectible card games.
- Dr. Martin Luther King Jr. Birthday Breakfast Celebration: This annual gathering is the largest served breakfast in the nation honoring the life and legacy of the late civil rights leader.
- HOSA (Health Occupations Students of America): events focus on preparing Future Health Professionals. The Competitive Events Program is designed to motivate HOSA members and provide a system for recognizing the competencies developed by members through Health Science and Biomedical Science class instruction, related job training, and HOSA related activities.

== Exhibition halls ==
Hall name	Dimensions	Area sq. ft.	Ceiling height	Floor load	Theater	Banquet	Classroom	10x10 booths
Battelle Grand	281x177	49,522	33'	150 psf/8,000 single vehicle	4434	2290	2469	219
Battelle Grand Mezzanine		22,550	22'			980		105
Battelle Grand North	160x177	27,922	33'	150 psf/8,000 single vehicle	2480	1440	1131	105
Battelle Grand North Mezzanine			22'			730		73
Battelle Grand South	124x177	21,600	33'	150 psf/8,000 single vehicle	1442	950	684	81
Battelle Grand South Mezzanine			22'			250		32
Battelle A	73'6x86	6,321	33'	150 psf/8,000 single vehicle	588	300	210	-
Battelle B	73'6x86	6,321	33'	150 psf/8,000 single vehicle	588	300	210	-
Battelle C	74x176.75"	15,200	33'					
Exhibit Hall A	270x360	98,000	30'	Unlimited		6,200		530
Exhibit Hall B	330x360	118,000	30'	Unlimited		7,200		630
Exhibit Hall C	235x298 with corridor and 208x298 without corridor	72,000 with corridor and 63,950 without corridor	30'	Unlimited		4140		360
Exhibit Hall D	208x207 with corridor wall closed	87,000 without the corridor wall closed	30'	Unlimited		4,860		202

== Design ==
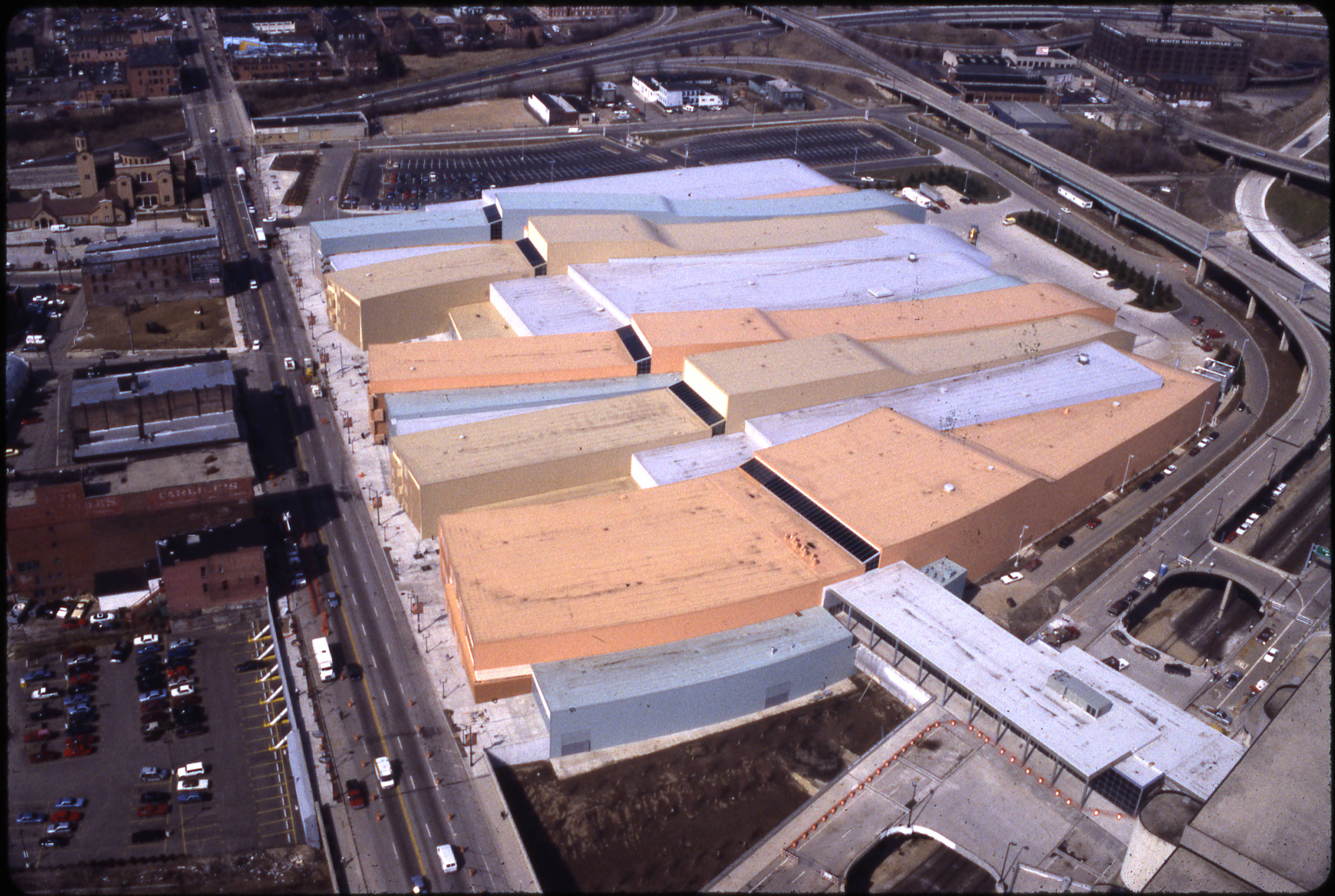
The Greater Columbus Convention Center in 1993, prior to multiple expansions

Architects of the building, Peter Eisenman and Richard Trott, were selected through an international design competition. Dan Graveline, an expert on convention centers, consulted on the project by creating the GCCC functional diagram to which the design was created.

The building was Eisenman's first civic commission and his second commission in Columbus (the first being the Wexner Center for the Arts). The large exhibition space is the feature of the building with meeting rooms coming off its side. The simple plan, color-coding sections of the building and carpeting aided by wayfinding help guest to easily navigate the building. The facade of the building along a three-block stretch of High Street alternates masonry and glass cladding and is broken up in 11 segments. The interior concourse has a zigzagging path that breaks up its length and creates the illusion of height through skylights, overhead footbridges and suspended ceilings.Executive Director of the Franklin County Convention Facilities Authority, Claire S. Hazucha, felt that the building's nontraditional design would be a selling point.

Owned and developed by the Franklin County Convention Facilities Authority, the GCCC embarked on a full-scale exterior and interior renovation in 2015 that was completed in 2017. As part of the expansion nearly 37,000 square feet of exhibit space and 10,000 square feet of two-level meeting space was added.

The venue currently has 447,000 square feet of exhibit space, 75 meeting rooms and 114,000 square feet of ballroom space, including 74,000-square-foot Battelle Grand, known as the largest multipurpose ballroom in Ohio. The Union Station Ballroom measures 25,000 square feet, while the Short North Ballroom offers 15,000 square feet of space. The four contiguous exhibit halls encompass 373,000 square feet.
