= CBUS =

Bus line in Columbus, Ohio, US

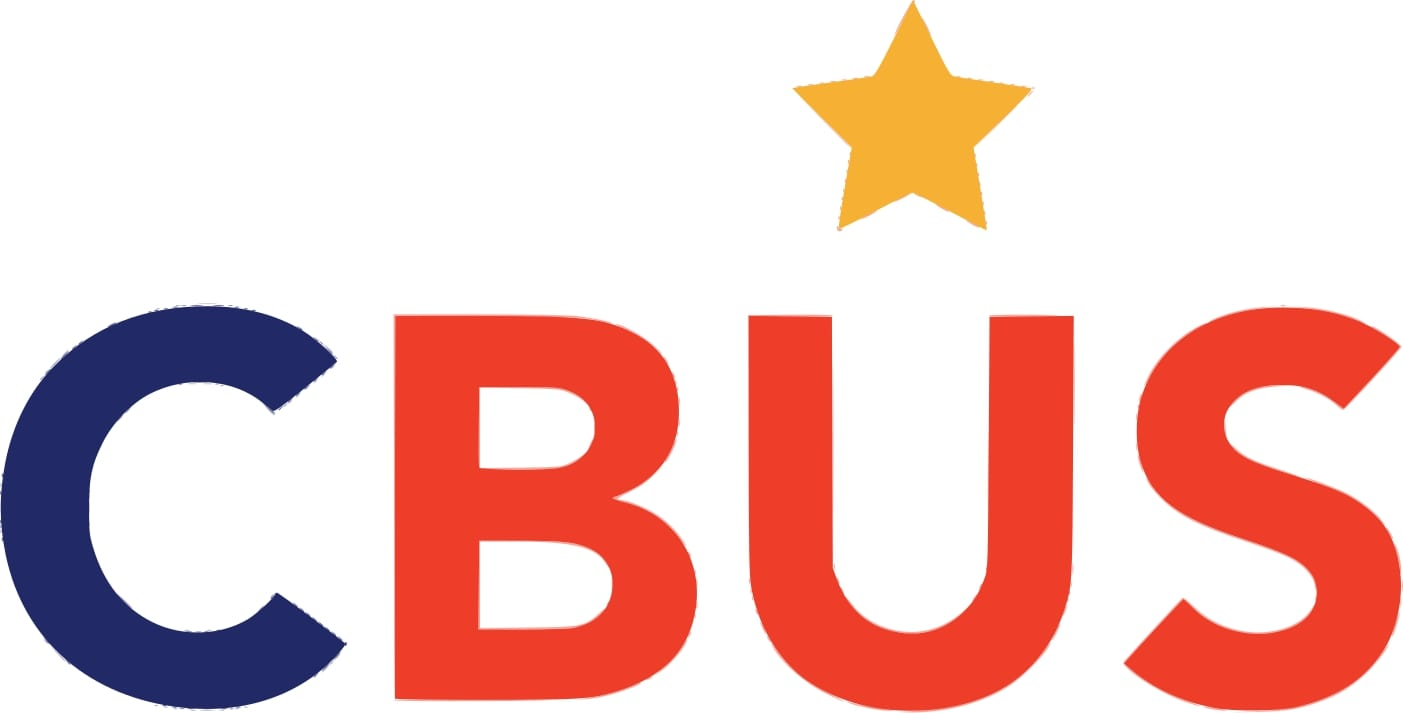

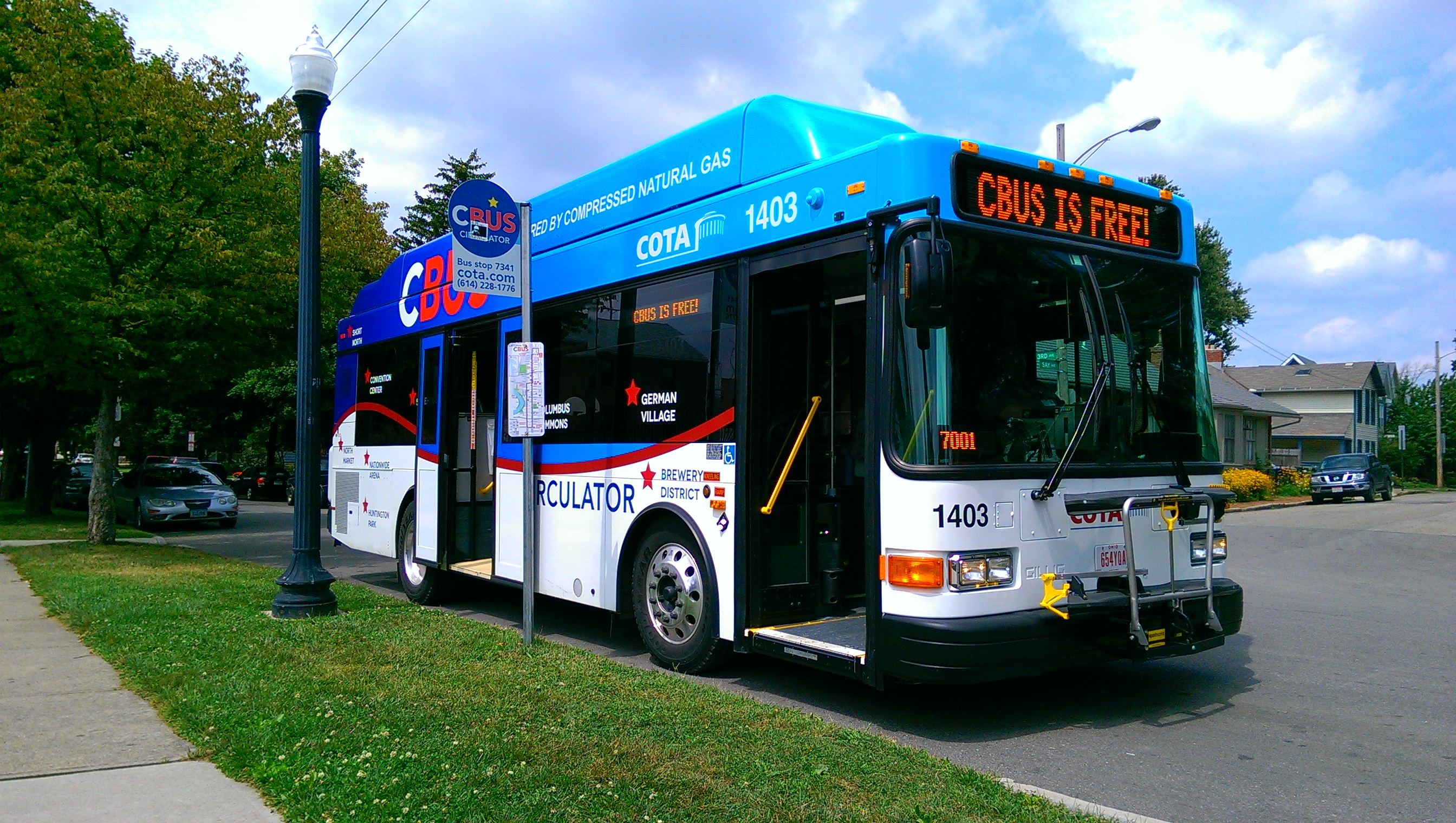
- CBUS circulator and signpost

Overview
- Operator: Central Ohio Transit Authority
- Vehicle: Gillig Low Floor, CNG-fueled, 30-ft buses
- Status: Defunct
- Began service: May 4, 2014
- Ended service: March 2020

Route
- Route type: Downtown circulator
- Locale: Columbus, Ohio
- Communities served: German Village, the Brewery District, Downtown Columbus, the Arena District, the Short North, Victorian Village, and Italian Village
- Start: Sycamore St. (Brewery District)
- Via: Front St. High St. 3rd Ave. Summit St. 2nd Ave.
- End: 3rd Ave. (The Short North)
- Length: 5.4 mi (8.7 km)

Service
- Frequency: 10-15 minutes
- Operates: 7 days per week
- Ridership: 692,221 (2018)
- Timetable: CBUS timetable cota.com
- Map: CBUS route map

The CBUS was a free downtown circulator bus in Columbus, Ohio. The service was operated by the Central Ohio Transit Authority. The CBUS service primarily traveled along High Street between the Brewery District and the Short North. The service had uniquely-branded 30-foot buses stopping at round "CBUS" signs. The service operated every 10–15 minutes, seven days per week. The service began operation on May 5, 2014.

CBUS service was suspended in 2020 during the COVID-19 pandemic; it was announced in August 2021 that the service would not return.

== Name ==
The service was named for "Cbus", a local nickname for the city that dates to at least 2004. It is not known who coined the name, though it was popularized in 2005 with a t-shirt design sold in local clothing stores, as well as C-BUS Magazine, published from 2005 to 2008. The name soon spread to other clothing items, a sports bar, and an annual cycling tour.

== Service ==
CBUS route map

The CBUS operated a 7-day service. It ran more frequently than most COTA services, operating every 10 minutes during the day and every 15 minutes at night.

The CBUS route was utilized by downtown workers, local residents, and tourists. The service had more tourists than other COTA lines, prompting the agency to staff the service with knowledgeable operators who complete Certified Tourism Ambassador training. These operators wore gold star pins displaying the certification.

Buses operating the CBUS route had unique livery, colored sky blue and gray. The fleet included six buses numbered 1401-1406, 2014 Gillig Low Floor CNG-fueled buses. The 29-ft. buses were notedly shorter than most others in COTA's fleet, measuring 35 to 40 ft.

=== Route ===
The CBUS circulated north and south from Sycamore Street in the Brewery District through Downtown Columbus to Third Avenue in the Short North, primarily along High and Front Streets. The route was 5.4 miles (8.7 km) long and includes 29 stops.

Landmarks and parks along the line included the Columbus Commons, the Ohio Theatre, the Ohio Statehouse, Sensenbrenner Park, Battelle Hall and the Greater Columbus Convention Center, North Market, Goodale Park, and the Pizzuti Collection.

== History ==
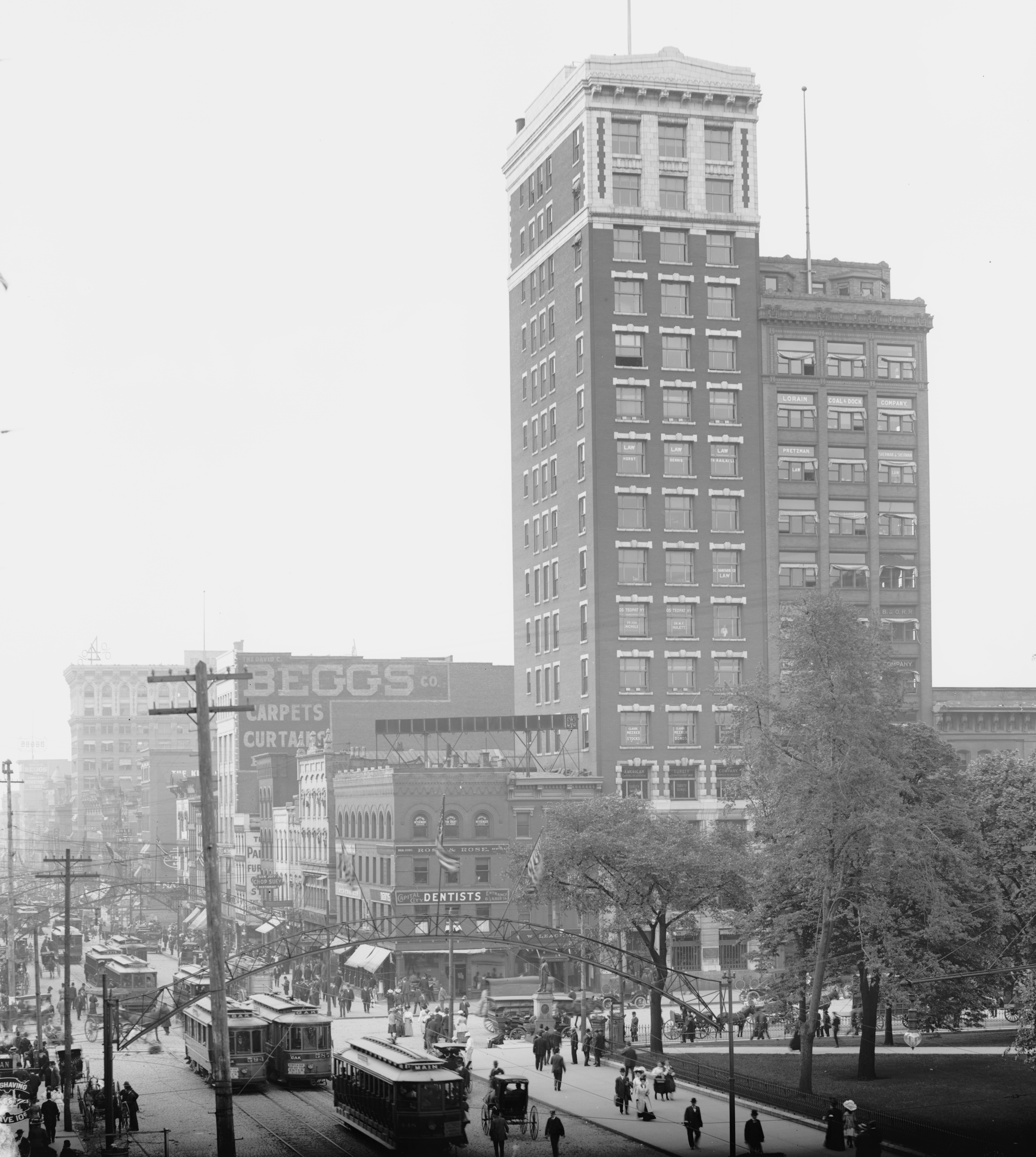
High St. streetcars underneath streetcar arches, c. 1906-15

The first mass transit in Columbus was a horsecar line, which operated along a two-mile stretch on High Street beginning in 1863. The line ran from Union Station at Naughten Street (now Nationwide Boulevard) south to Livingston Avenue.

The CBUS had other predecessor services, including COTA LINK, which lasted from 1993 to 2004. That service utilized buses designed to resemble old-fashioned trolleys between the Short North and the southern end of downtown, and had fares of 25 cents. Another predecessor was the Beeline, a shuttle bus that operated on High Street between Fulton and Chestnut Streets. That service began in 1979 and also had a 25-cent fare.

A proposal in COTA's 1999 long-range transit plan would add a 1.2-mile street-level rail line from the Brewery District to the Short North along High Street or Front Street. The plan relied upon COTA securing funding in a November 1999 ballot initiative, which failed with only 45 percent of voter support.

An initiative from about 2006 to 2009 proposed to bring streetcars back to Columbus. The Columbus Streetcar was proposed for three different routes; the most popular would have been a 2.1-mile route from German Village to the Short North via High Street (the same route the CBUS utilizes today). The Great Recession affected the city's budget, and paired with a failure to acquire state or federal funding, forced the plan to be cut.

The CBUS was initially designed with commuters, downtown workers, and visitors in mind.

COTA ordered the service's six buses in August 2013. At the CBUS service's opening in May 2014, the service was subsidized to be free for passengers through the end of the year, though it was uncertain if the subsidies would remain afterward. The fare cost would have been implemented at 50 cents if not subsidized. The service was estimated to cost $1.3 million per year, with 10 percent of that cost subsidized.

COTA officials mentioned in early 2014 that if the program became successful, other circulator routes could be added. In 2019, the service was reportedly successful, with ridership of about 700,000 per year in 2018.

At the beginning of the COVID-19 pandemic in Columbus, Ohio, COTA suspended nonessential and less-frequented routes, including the CBUS. It was reported that the service may be restored by September 2021, if vaccination rates rise and virus rates remain low. In August 2021, COTA announced that the service will not return.

== See also ==
- List of COTA routes and services
- Public transit in Columbus, Ohio
