= Sensenbrenner Park =

Park in Columbus, Ohio, U.S.

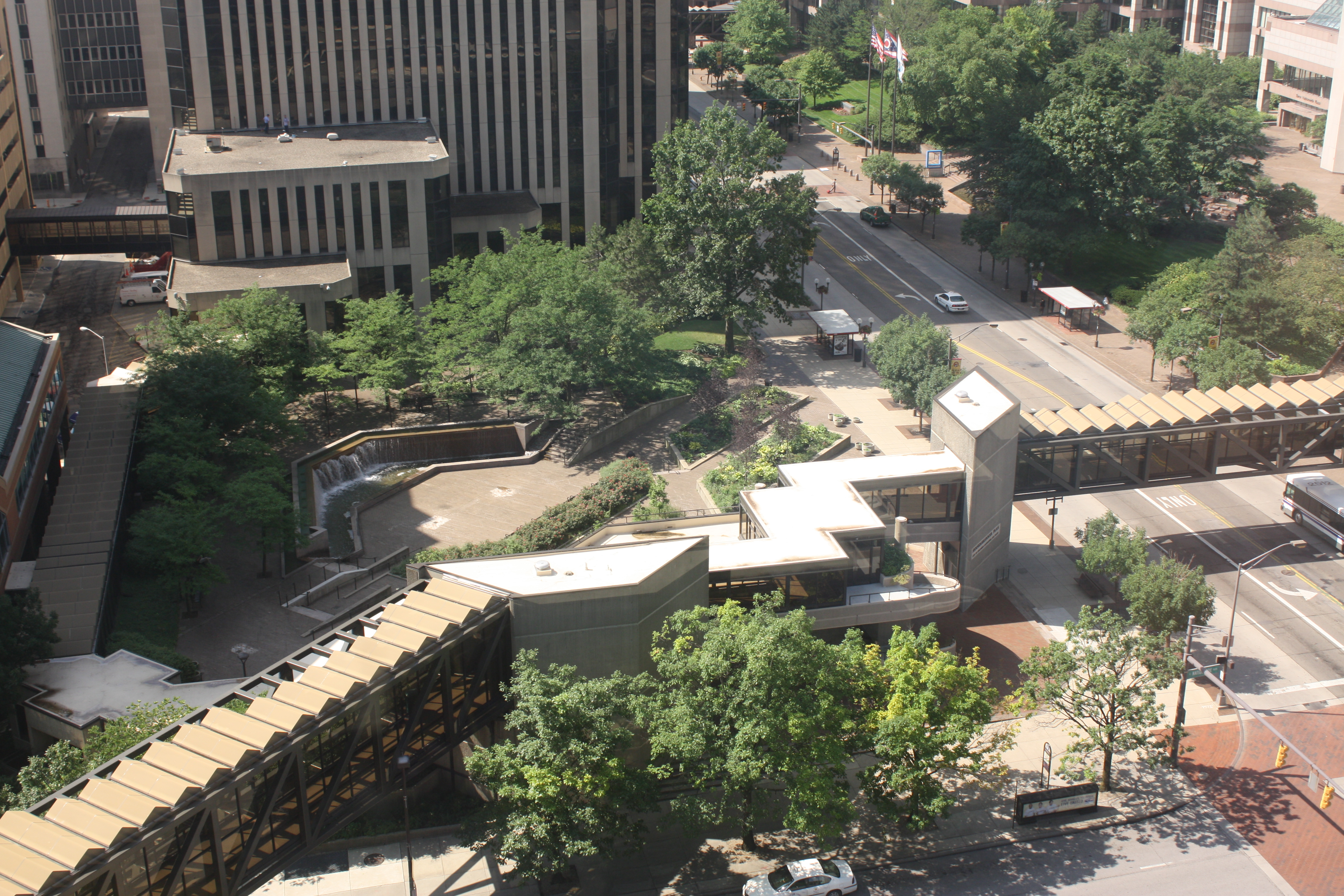
- Aerial view of the park, 2011
- Interactive map of Sensenbrenner Park
- Coordinates: 39°58′07″N 83°00′05″W
- Administrator: Columbus Recreation and Parks Department
- Public transit: 1, 2, 5, 6, 9, 13, 102, AirConnect, CMAX, Night Owl; CoGo

Sensenbrenner Park is a .9-acre (0.36 ha) park in downtown Columbus, Ohio, United States. The park was dedicated on September 18, 1980, and commemorates former mayor Jack Sensenbrenner.

== See also ==
- List of parks in Columbus, Ohio
