= Columbus Commons =

Park and green space in Columbus, Ohio, U.S.

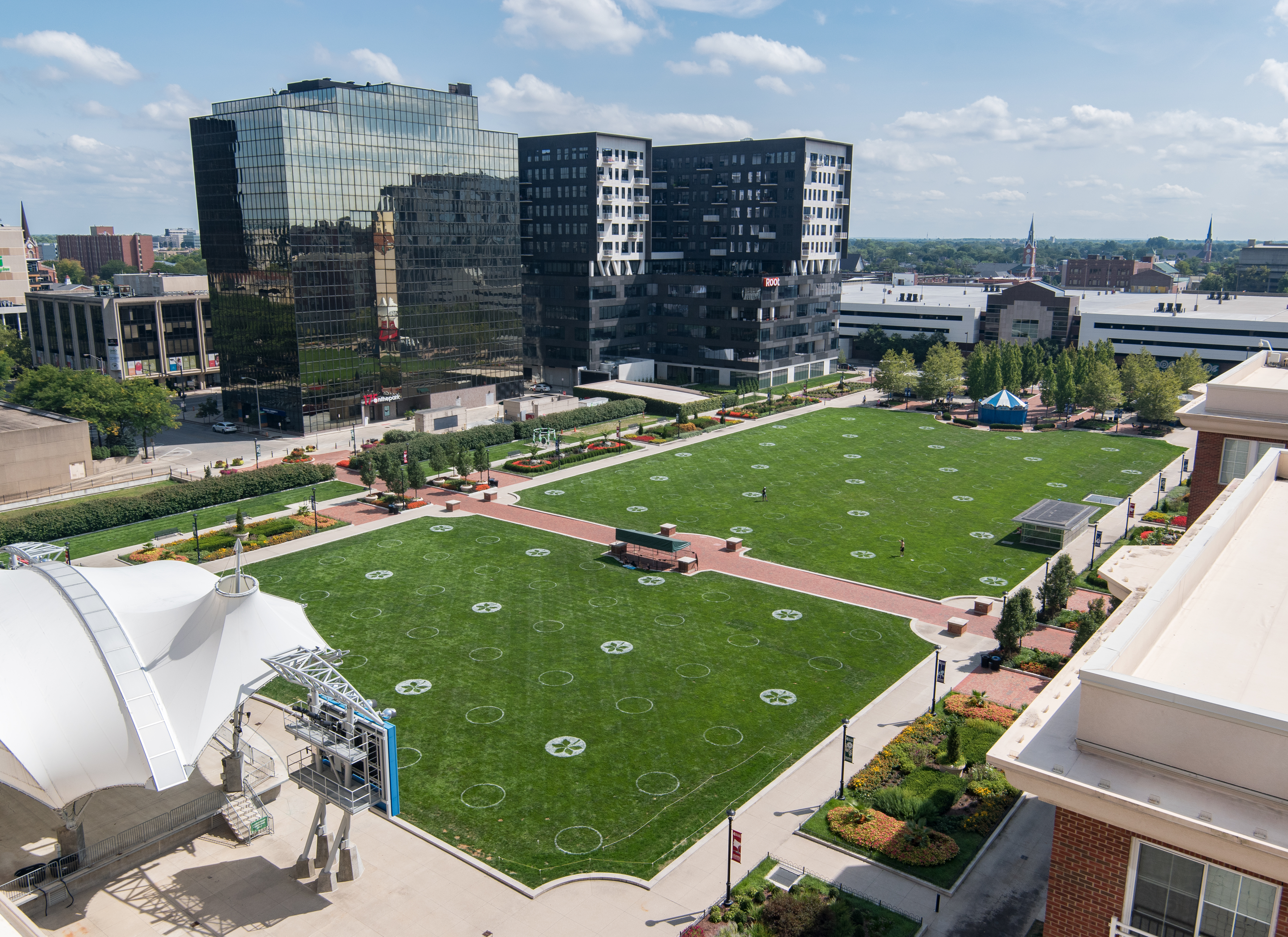
- Interactive map of Columbus Commons
- Type: Urban park
- Location: Columbus, Ohio
- Coordinates: 39°57′31″N 82°59′55″W
- Area: 6 acres (2.4 ha) (originally 9 acres)
- Created: May 26, 2011
- Operator: Capitol South
- Status: Open all year 7 a.m. – 11 p.m.
- Public transit: 1, 2, 6, 8, 9, 13, 41, 42, 43, 44, 45, 46, 102, AirConnect, CMAX; CoGo

John F. Wolfe Columbus Commons is a 6-acre (2.4 ha) park and green space in downtown Columbus, Ohio, located on the site of the former Columbus City Center mall. The park features gardens, a performance stage, carousel, interactive playground equipment, and two foodservice buildings. The project was developed by Columbus Downtown Development Corporation (CDDC) and Capitol South Community Urban Redevelopment Corporation (Capitol South). The park opened on May 26, 2011.

On May 11, 2017, Columbus Commons was re-dedicated in honor of community leader John F. Wolfe, who died in 2016, and is now known as the John F. Wolfe Columbus Commons.

== History ==
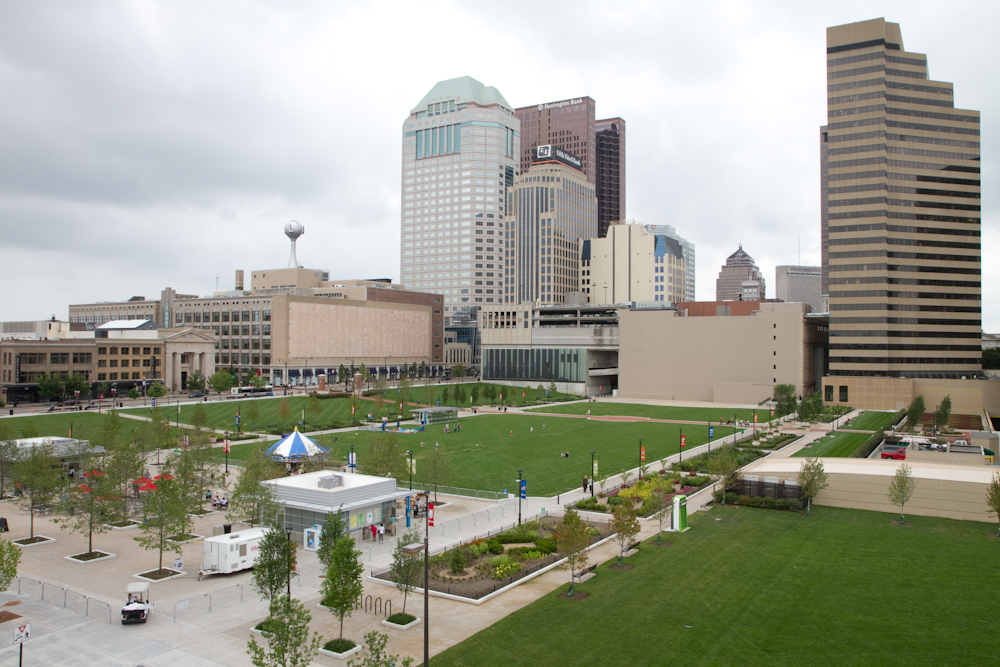
The park was larger c. 2011 before apartments were constructed around it

With the decline of Columbus City Center, plans were announced in February 2009 to replace the mall with a mixed-used project that included an urban park, residential units, offices, restaurants and shops. Columbus City Council approved Capitol South to refinance existing City Center parking garage loans and use funds earmarked for downtown housing to finance the project. CDDC and Capitol South, under the direction of their CEO and President Guy Worley, the Franklin County Commissioners and Columbus Metro Parks, funded the development of the Columbus Commons park. Demolition of City Center began in September 2009 and construction of Columbus Commons park began in mid-2010.

The design team was made up of construction manager Corna-Kokosing, architects Moody Nolan and landscape architects EDGE Group. The park opened to the public on Memorial Day weekend (May 26) 2011.

The park featured an outdoor reading room on the southeast corner of the park, including browsing material for children and adults courtesy of the nonprofit group Friends of the Columbus Metropolitan Library. The reading room had tables and chairs under umbrellas and offered free Wi-Fi from the Columbus Metropolitan Library.

== Attractions ==
=== Pavilion ===
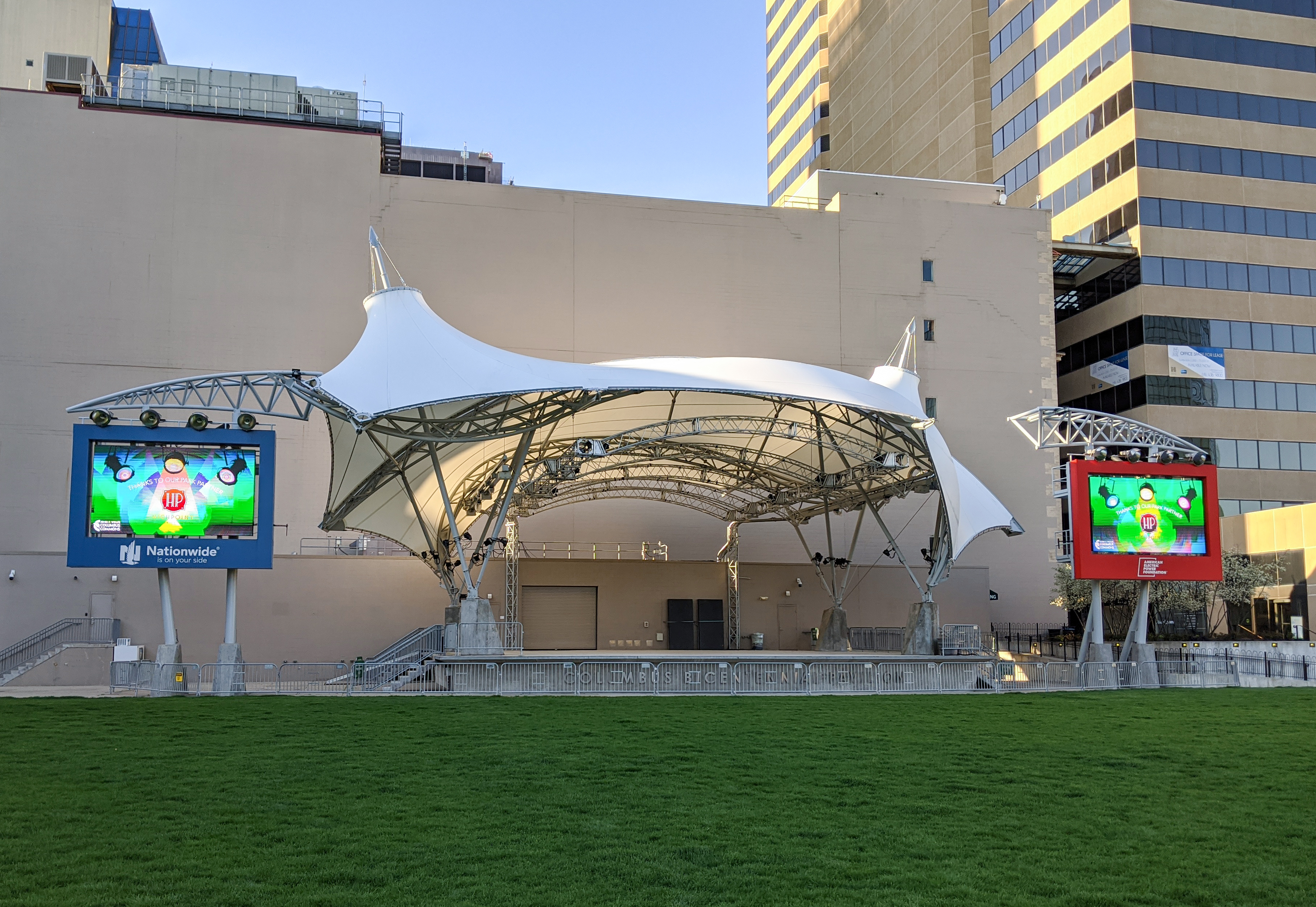
The Columbus Bicentennial Pavilion

Construction of the Columbus Bicentennial Pavilion was the signature capital project celebrating Columbus’ bicentennial in 2012. Since its completion, the iconic structure has drawn the central Ohio community to the heart of Downtown for live concerts and entertainment year round.

The Columbus Bicentennial Pavilion was designed by FTL Design Engineering Studio, the same firm that designed the Capitol Concert Pavilion in Washington, D.C., the Carlos Moseley Pavilion in Manhattan, and the Cirque du Soleil Theater at Disney World. The design for Columbus is exclusive: a one-of-a-kind, white tensile fabric canopy structure with a 40-foot by 60-foot stage and lighting, video, and sound equipment.

CDDC began construction on the Columbus Bicentennial Pavilion in fall 2011 and the pavilion opened in May 2012, just in time for the beginning of the annual event season. The project was funded by a public-private partnership led by the City of Columbus, American Electric Power, and Nationwide Insurance.

=== Carousel ===
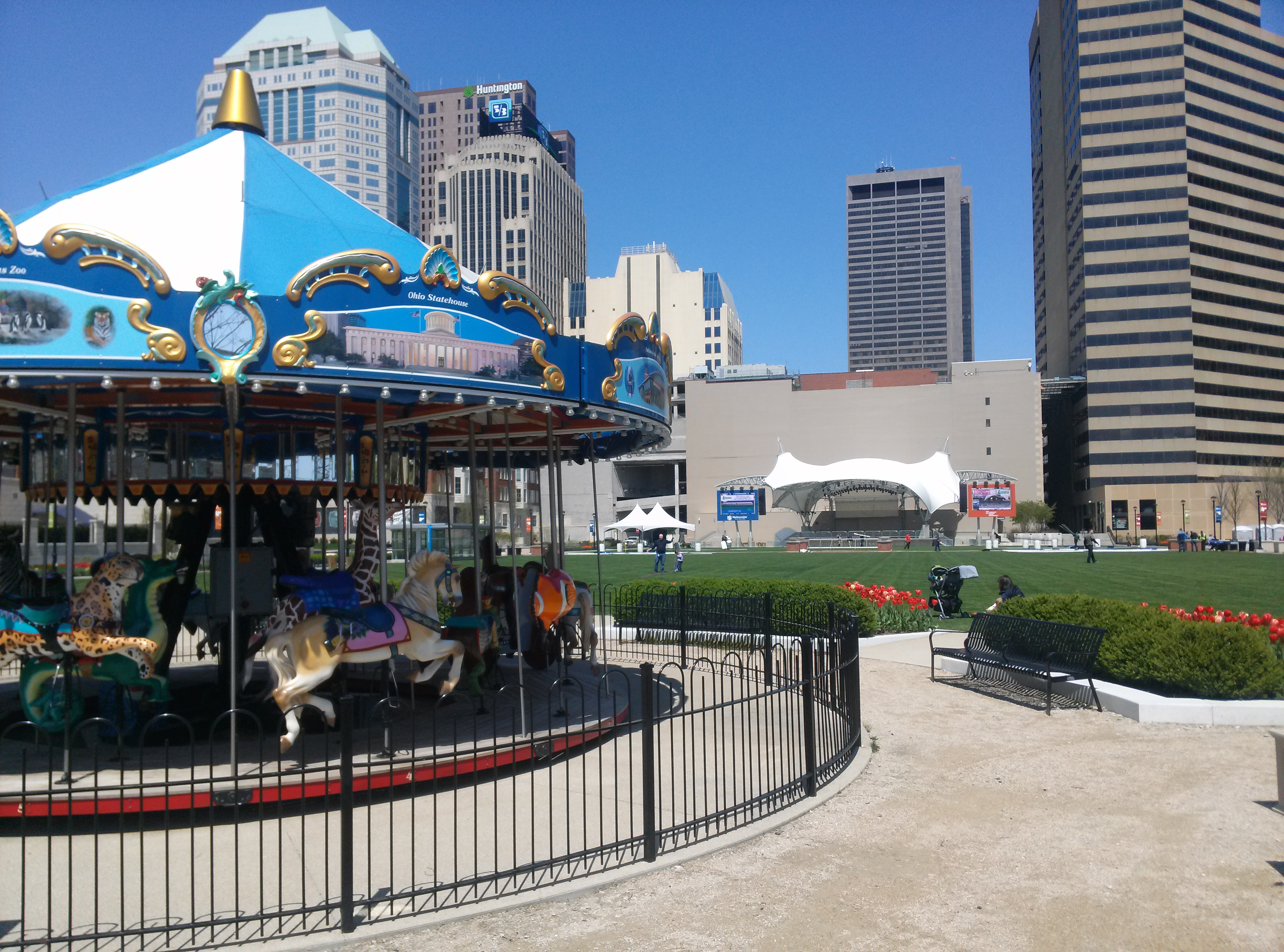
The hand-carved carousel at Columbus Commons

The Commons is home to a 20-seat carousel with characters hand-carved by Mansfield's Carousel Works. Characters range from the traditional horses to a fish, a tiger, a giraffe and an OSU-themed cart. The rounding boards that surround the canopy feature locally-inspired murals with scenes of the Ohio Stadium and Franklin Park Conservatory to name a few.

=== Cafe ===
Tortilla Street Food and Jeni’s Splendid Ice Creams operate in the Commons cafés at the west and east side of the Bosque respectively. The shops are open May through October.

=== Gardens ===
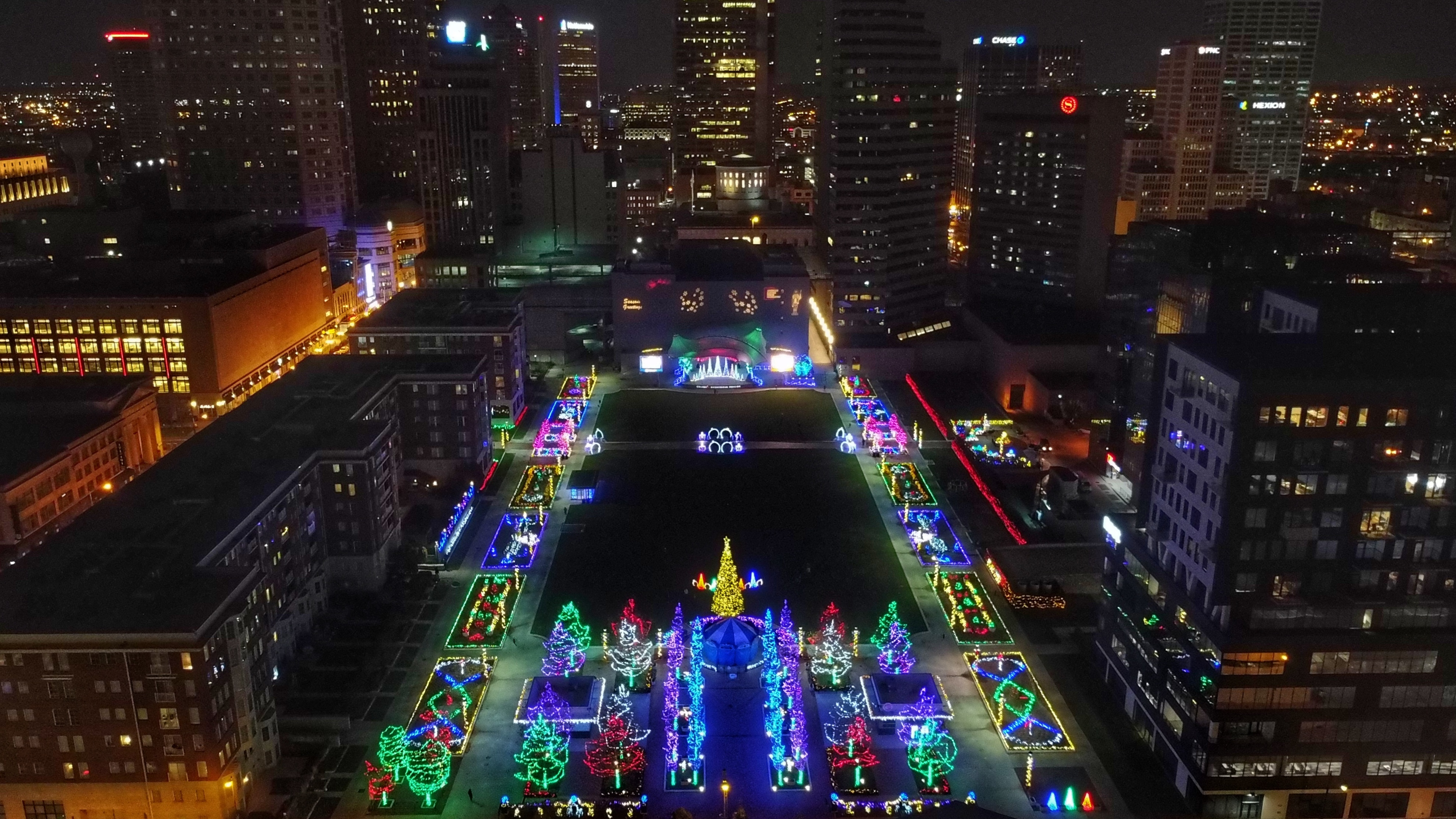
Holiday Lights at Columbus Commons

The park is lined with twelve 2,000-square-foot (190 m^{2}) garden plots. Just as Columbus is a four-season city, the gardens have four-season appeal. With a dynamic mix of perennials, shrubs, ornamental grasses, evergreens and annuals, there’s something beautiful to see year-round.

=== Open play ===
The park features several other amenities for visitors including a NEOS electronic playground. At these times, the Imagination Playground, which is a compilation of life-size foam shapes and blocks, is also available for patrons to enjoy.

=== Events ===
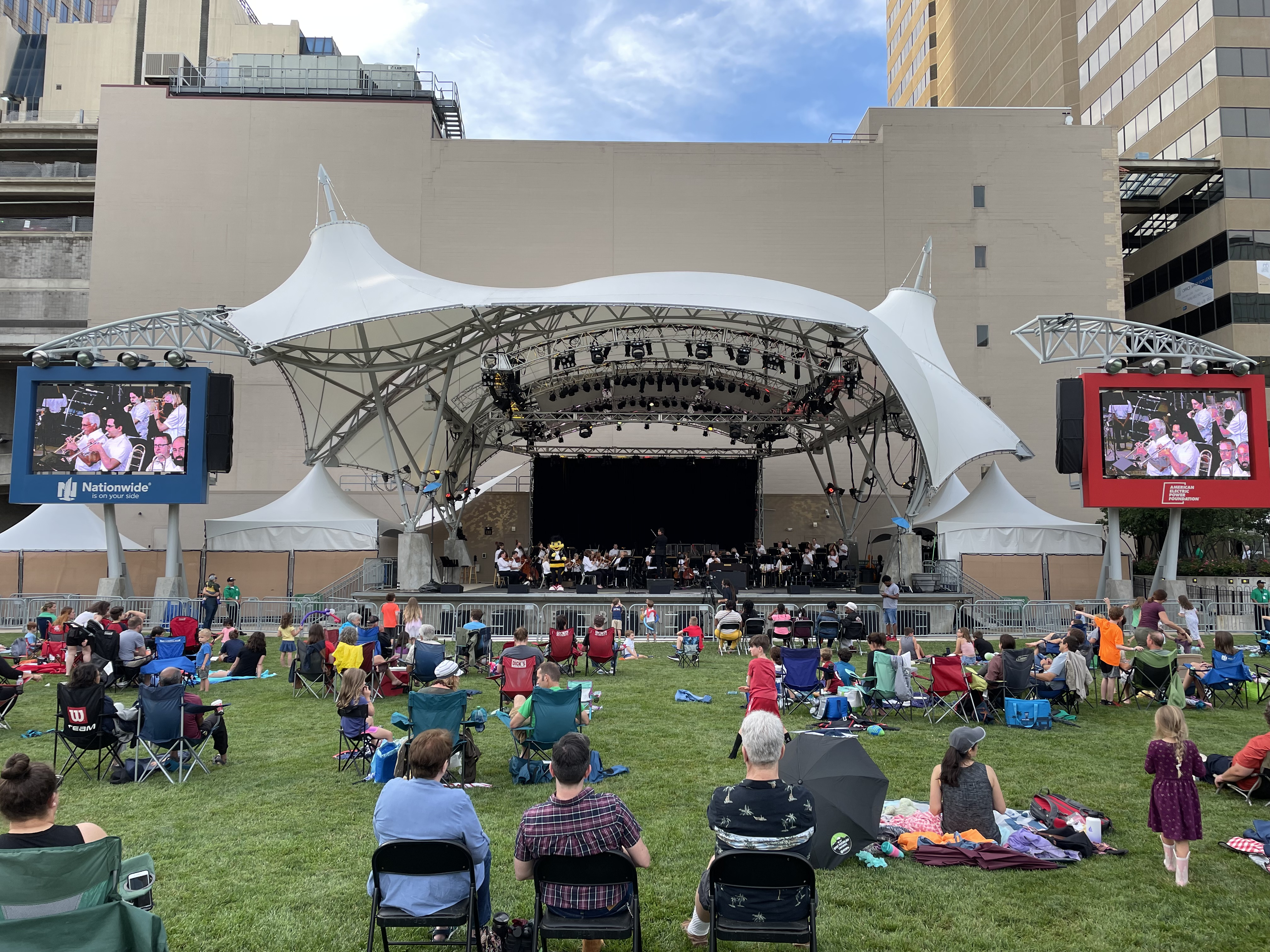
Columbus Symphony Orchestra Pops concert at Columbus Commons

John F. Wolfe Columbus Commons annually hosts more than 200 events. Capitol South is responsible for actively programming the park from May to October including concerts, family events, kickball, movies, fitness classes and food trucks. Since its opening, Columbus Commons has hosted multiple local, regional and national events including the Columbus Food Truck and Cart Festival, the Capital City Half Marathon, Slice of Columbus, the Pelotonia Opening Ceremony, the 2013 President’s Cup Opening Ceremony, and the 2015 National Gay Softball World Series Opening Ceremony. Columbus Commons is also the summer home of the Columbus Symphony Orchestra and has hosted their summer performance series, Picnic with the Pops, since 2012.

=== Parking and public transit ===
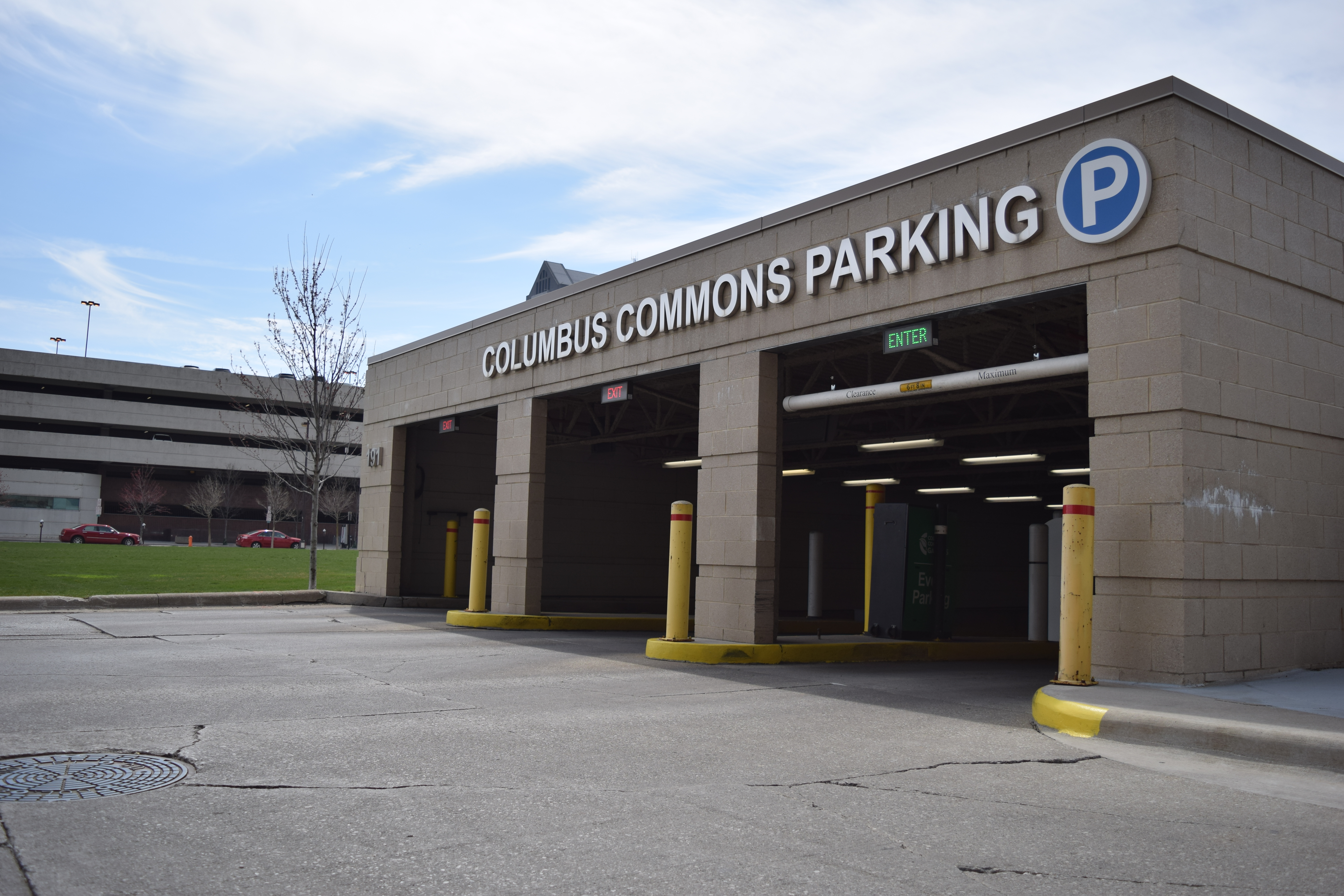
Columbus Commons underground garage

Columbus Commons is adjacent to two parking garages. The Columbus Commons Main Garage is located at 55 E. Rich St and the Columbus Commons Underground garage is located at 191 S Third Street. Both provide easy access to the park for events. Additionally, revenue from these garages helps to support free programming at the park as produced by Capitol South. The park also lies adjacent to the COTA Transit Terminal, a bus terminal for the Central Ohio Transit Authority. The station, along with bus stops on High and 3rd Streets, give access to most city bus lines. The park also has a nearby CoGo bikeshare station.

== Awards and recognition ==
In 2012, Columbus Commons received an EXPY award from Experience Columbus. In 2014, the park was a ULI Open Space Award finalist.

== See also ==
- Highpoint on Columbus Commons
- List of parks in Columbus, Ohio
