= Wexner Center for the Arts =

Contemporary art, Ohio State University

Coordinates: 40.000188°N 83.009442°W

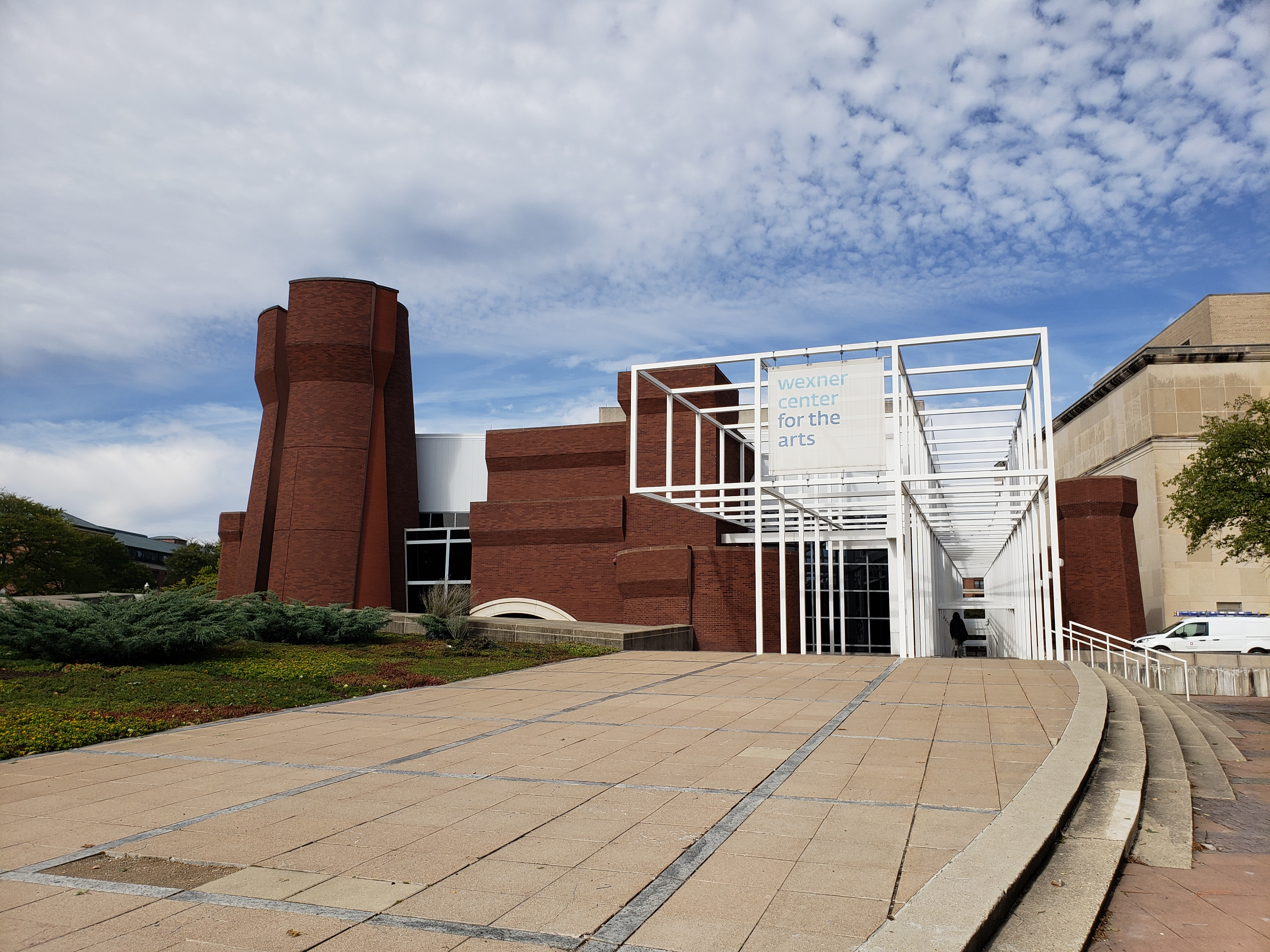
- Interactive map of the Wexner Center for the Arts area

General information
- Location: 1871 North High Street, Columbus, Ohio
- Owner: Ohio State University

Other information
- Seating capacity: 2,599 (Mershon Auditorium)
- Public transit: 1, 2, 31, Night Owl

Website
- www.wexarts.org

The Wexner Center for the Arts is the Ohio State University's "multidisciplinary, international laboratory for the exploration and advancement of contemporary art."

The Wexner Center is a lab and public gallery, but not an art museum, as it does not collect art. However, when the center was constructed, it replaced the University Gallery of Fine Arts, and assumed possession and stewardship of the University Gallery's permanent collection of roughly 3,000 art works. The collection serves a secondary role in the center's programs in the visual, media and performing arts. The Wexner Center is made available to Ohio State University students and scholars for study, and is open to the public. The Wexner Center opened in November 1989, named in honor of the father of Limited Brands founder Leslie Wexner, who was a major donor to the center.

== History ==
The precursor was the University Gallery of Fine Art which was curated by the university's fine art director. In 1970, under Director Betty Collings' leadership, the gallery began hosting major contemporary artists and acquiring the collection that would become the Wexner Center as a response to student grievances about the Kent State shootings. In the 1980s, Jonathan Green became director and acquired art that expressed activism. The gallery's final exhibit was “AIDS: The Artists’ Response” in 1989 prior to the opening of the Wexner Center.

The $43 million Wexner Center, commissioned by Ohio State University, was named after the father of Leslie H. Wexner, chairman of Limited Brands, an Ohio native and Ohio State alumnus who pledged $25 million to the project. Peter Eisenman won the design competition for the Wexner in 1983 over four other, more experienced finalists: Cesar Pelli; Michael Graves; Kallmann McKinnell & Wood; and Arthur Erickson. (Each was paired with a local architect.) Progressive Architecture magazine devoted a whole issue to the building even before it was finished.

The Wexner Center opened on November 17, 1989, and architects like Philip Johnson, Richard Meier and Charles Gwathmey convened in Columbus to mark the building's completion with a public forum on the state of American architecture. The event was hailed by The New York Times as "one of the most eagerly awaited architectural events of the last decade."

During its three-year renovation between 2002 and 2005, the Wexner relocated its galleries in a former coffin factory two miles away, while the performing arts and film programs continued at the center. It typically drew 200,000 to 250,000 visitors a year before the renovation. In November 2005, the Wexner Center reopened.

Following the release of the Epstein files, which revealed Les Wexner's close ties with child sex offender Jeffrey Epstein, protestors submitted a formal name review and called for Wexner's surname to be removed from the center.

== Architecture ==
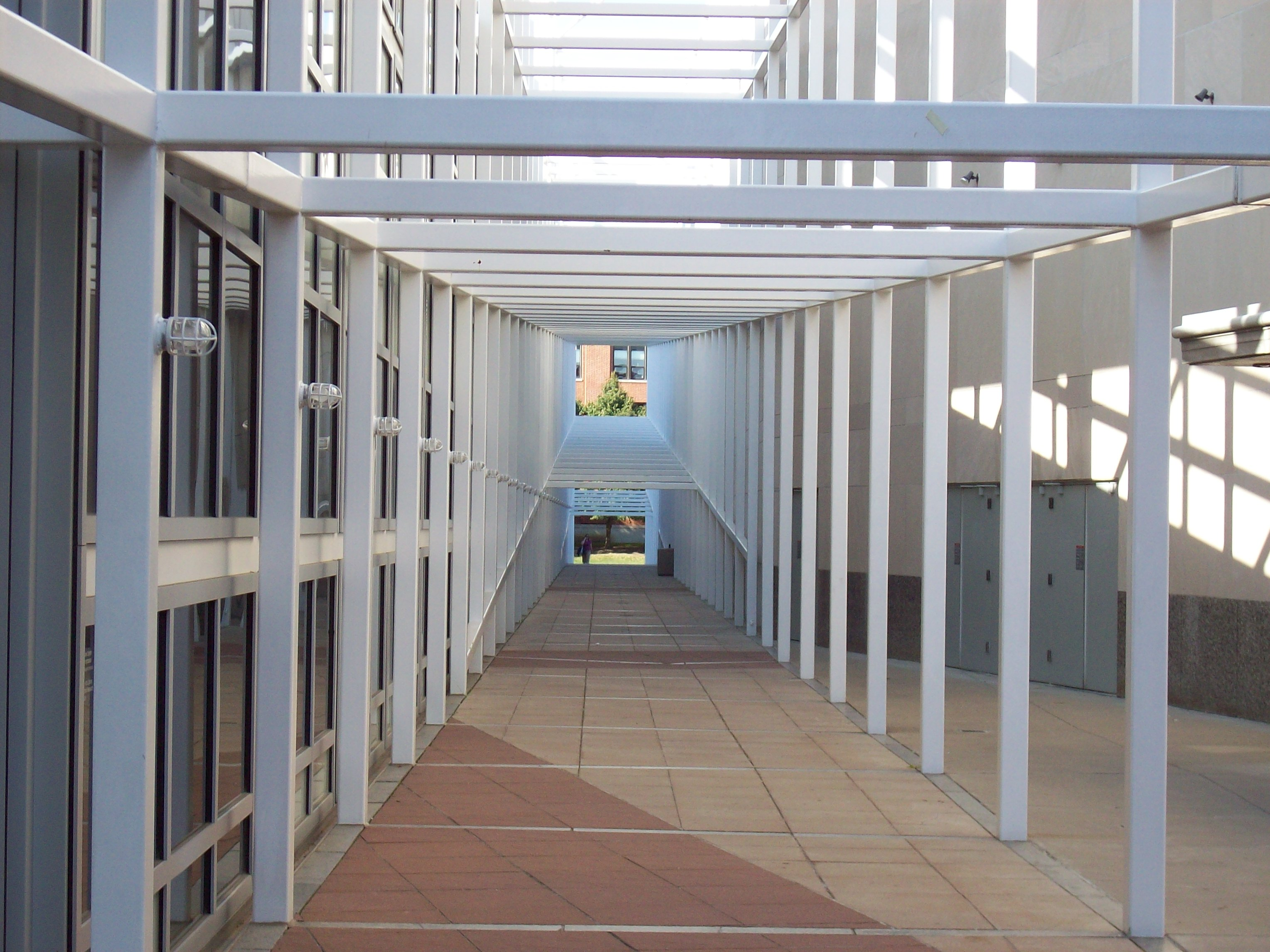
Sidewalk in the Wexner Center

The Wexner Center's 108,000 square feet (10,000 m^{2}), three-story building was designed by architects Peter Eisenman of New York and the late Richard Trott of Columbus with landscape architect Laurie Olin of Philadelphia. It was the first major public building to be designed by Eisenman, previously known primarily as a teacher and theorist. Based on the controversial theory that art should be "challenged" by its environment rather than displayed neutrally, the museum raised Eisenman's profile and he went on to design and build a number of other major projects including the Memorial to the Murdered Jews of Europe in Berlin.

When determining the site, Eisenman and Trott rejected four options from OSU in favor of their own site between Weigel Hall, home of the School of Music, and Mershon Auditorium, a 2,599-seat theater.

The design includes a large, white metal grid meant to suggest scaffolding, to give the building a sense of incompleteness in tune with the architect's deconstructivist tastes. Eisenman also took note of the mismatched street grids of the OSU campus and the city of Columbus, which vary by 12.25 degrees, and designed the Wexner Center to alternate which grids it followed. The result was a building of sometimes questionable functionality, but admitted architectural interest. The center's brick turrets make reference to the Ohio State University Armory and Gymnasium, a castle-like building that occupied the site until 1958.

Included in the Wexner Center space are a film and video theater, a performance space – the Mershon Center stage, which seats 2,500 for dance, music, theater, multimedia productions and lectures –, a film and video post production studio, a bookstore, café, and 12,000 square feet (1,100 m^{2}) of galleries. The galleries are placed linearly in the building space to emphasize progression. The Fine Arts Library was located to the lower level of the building. Devoid of natural light, the architects employed an alternating warm and cool fluorescent lighting to mimic daylight and a grey palate that put the focus on the collection.

In 1993, the Wexner Center installed Maya Lin's large-scale site-specific installation Groundswell. The work reinterprets Eastern and Western landscape forms in shattered tempered glass to fill in three sites of the building's design. That year, the building won the American Institute of Architects' National Honor Award.

The 2005 renovation originally enlisted the help of a local firm, then switched to Arup. In addition to the building envelope, the scope of renovation includes HVAC, lighting, electrical, plumbing, fire protection systems. The renovation works had a minimum impact on the original architectural design while improving environmental, daylight and climate control. With the restoration of the center as a whole, the bookstore, film and video theater, and café sections were all revamped, equipment and layout-wise.

== Programs ==
=== Exhibitions ===
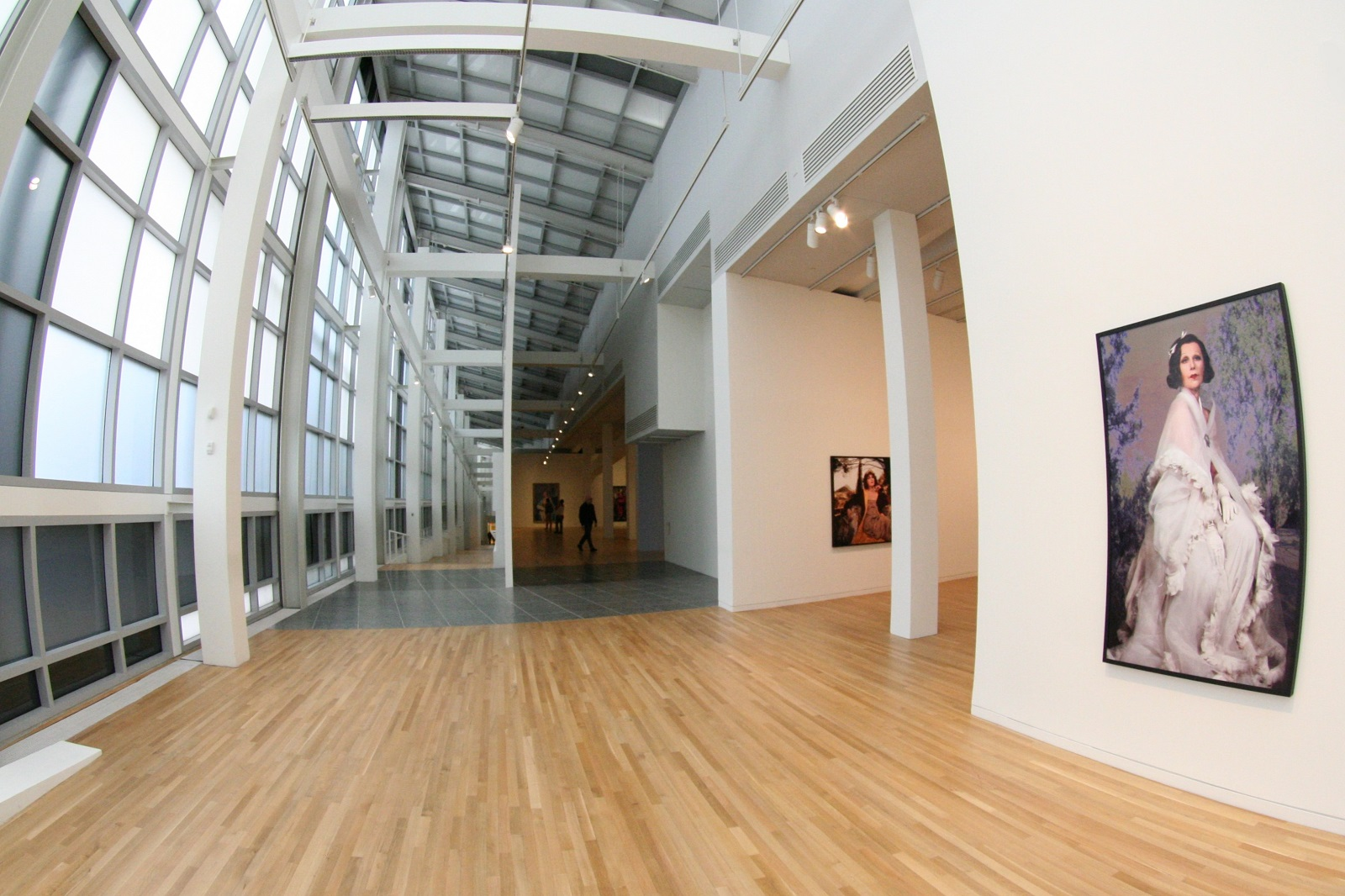
A work by Cindy Sherman displayed in the Wexner Center (right)

Notable exhibitions include: Chris Marker: Silent Movie, Julie Taymor: Playing With Fire, Shirin Neshat: Suite Fantastique, As Painting: Division and Displacement, Mood River, Pier Paolo Calzolari, Part Object Part Sculpture, Twice Untitled and Other Pictures (looking back), Louise Lawler, Chris Marker Staring Back, William Wegman: Funney/Strange, Andy Warhol: Other Voices, Other Rooms, and William Forsythe: Transfigurations.

In 2002, the Wexner staged Mood River, one of the most comprehensive exhibitions of industrial and commercial design staged in America, featuring artwork by Simparch, Tony Cragg, and E.V. Day; designs by Peter Eisenman, Kivi Sotamaa, and Ben van Berkel; and "products" like the Stealth Bomber and the Redman Self-Defense Instructor suits. In 2017, the gallery featured an exhibition by Cindy Sherman. In 2018, the Wexner showcased the works of 16 artists working in contemporary abstraction, including Eric N. Mack, Sam Gilliam and Zachary Armstrong. In 2019, the Wexner Center kicked off its 30th anniversary year of exhibitions with "HERE: Ann Hamilton, Jenny Holzer, Maya Lin."

The Box, the Wexner Center's dedicated to video and short film work opened in September 2005 and typically offers a new piece every month.

In 2022, admission to the Wexner Center for the Arts's galleries became free for all audiences.

=== Film/Video Theater ===
The Wexner Center's Film/Video department is known for screening films that are new and different, rare and classic, or just too edgy for the multiplex. They have a year-round theater program that includes independent films, international cinema, new documentaries, classics, and experimental film. Films are often accompanied by visiting filmmakers discussing their works for the public.

The Film/Video department presents more than 180 films and videos annually in all formats and genres in the center's Film/Video Theater that seats about 300; hosts visiting filmmakers year-round; operates the Film/Video Studio Program (known as the Art & Technology program until 2010), which is an in-kind residency program that offers production and post-production support to filmmakers and video artists; programs The Box, the center's dedicated video exhibition space; and organizes gallery-based exhibitions involving moving image media. The department was given the "Outstanding Organization" Award from NAMAC, the National Alliance for Media Arts and Culture, in 2002.

=== Performing arts ===
Creative residency and commissioning projects for artists include: Bill T. Jones, Anne Bogart and the SITI Company, Big Art Group, Ann Hamilton (in collaboration with Meg Stuart and subsequently with Meredith Monk), Improbable Theatre, Bebe Miller, The Builders Association, Akram Khan, Elizabeth Streb, Eiko & Koma, The Wooster Group, Savion Glover, Urban Bush Women, Anthony Davis, Richard Maxwell, da da kamera, Mark Morris, Young Jean Lee's Theater Company, and Kronos Quartet.

== Artist awards ==
=== The Wexner Prize ===
Established in 1992, the Wexner Prize recognizes an artist whose work reflects exceptional innovation and the highest standards of artistic quality and integrity.

The prize includes a $50,000 award and an engraved commemorative sculpture designed by Jim Dine in 1991. Programs at the Wexner Center explore the prize recipient's career and thought.

Past winners include film and theater director Peter Brook (1992), choreographer Merce Cunningham and composer John Cage (1993), artist Bruce Nauman (1994), choreographer and filmmaker Yvonne Rainer (1995), filmmaker Martin Scorsese (1996/97), painter Gerhard Richter (1998), sculptor Louise Bourgeois (1999), artist Robert Rauschenberg (2000), architect Renzo Piano (2001), choreographer William Forsythe (2002), designer Issey Miyake (2004), choreographer Bill T. Jones (2005), and filmmaker Spike Lee (2008).

=== Artist residencies ===
Residencies at the Wexner Center offer support to artists and often provide opportunities for interaction with the Ohio State community and the public at large. They are an essential part of the Wex's mandate to be a creative research laboratory for all the arts.

Wexner Center Residency Awards are their most substantial and high-profile residencies. They are given annually in the main program areas—performing arts, media arts (film/video), and visual arts—with some projects extending over two or more years.

Other artists participating in exhibitions and performances also may receive commissions and often engage in residency activities—workshops, master classes, and discussion sessions with students or the community—during their time at the center. In addition, each year about 20 visiting filmmakers and video artists from around the world are invited to work in residence in the Film/Video Studio Program.

Wexner Center Residency Award recipients include:

Performing arts:

- Young Jean Lee's Theater Company
- The Builders Association
- da da kamera
- Twyla Tharp
- Elizabeth Streb/Ringside
- Mark Morris Dance Group
- The Wooster Group
- Anne Bogart/SITI Company (multiple)
- Improbable (multiple)
- Bill T. Jones
- Ann Carlson
- Amanda Miller/Pretty Ugly Dance Company
- Michael Curry, G.W. Mercier, Donald Holder, Molly Anderson (all collaborators with Julie Taymor)
- William Forsythe,

Visual arts:

- Kerry James Marshall
- Zoe Leonard
- Josiah McElheny
- Maya Lin
- Ann Hamilton
- Barbara Kruger
- Lorna Simpson
- Barbara Bloom
- Alexis Smith
- Shirin Neshat
- Lee Mingwei
- Greg Lynn and Fabian Marcaccio
- Sarah Oppenheimer
- Hussein Chalayan
- Terry Allen
- Softworlds

Media arts:

- Guy Maddin
- Jennifer Reeder
- April Martin
- Yvonne Rainer
- Jennifer Reeves
- Deborah Stratman,
- Phil Collins
- Tom Kalin
- Judith Barry
- Todd Haynes
- Julie Dash
- Isaac Julien,
- Tacita Dean
- Miranda July
- Cheryl Dunn
- Rineke Dijkstra
- Sadie Benning
- William Wegman,
- Sowon Kwon, Steven Bognar
- Helen DeMichiel
- Iñigo Manglano-Ovalle
- Tom Poole
- Robert and Donald Kinney
- Steve Fagin,
- Daniel Minahan
- Chris Marker
- Paper Tiger Television.

== In popular media ==
Portions of the Jodie Foster-directed film Little Man Tate were shot at the Wexner Center in 1991.

== Unionization ==
On March 4, 2022, staff at the Wexner Center for the Arts announced their intent to form a union with the American Federation of State, County and Municipal Employees (AFSCME). Organizing under the name Wex Workers United, staff cited "long-standing issues at the Wex and Ohio State, including pay equity and working culture" and said that the COVID-19 pandemic exacerbated these problems. Wex Workers United sought, but were not granted, formal voluntary recognition of the union from leadership at the Ohio State University and the Wexner Center for the Arts. On March 22, 2023, the union was ratified by unanimous vote.

== Management ==
=== Operations ===
As of 2021, the Wexner Center had a staff of 70 and budget of $12 million.

In August 2021, it was announced that Burton would be leaving Wexner in November 2021 to become executive director of MOCA Los Angeles.

=== Directors ===
- Jonathan Green
- Robert Stearns
- 1993–2019: Sherri Geldin
- 2018–2021: Johanna Burton
- 2021–2022: Megan Cavanaugh and Kelly Stevelt, co-interim executive directors
- 2022–2025: Gaëtane Verna
