= Highpoint on Columbus Commons =

Apartment building in Columbus, Ohio

Coordinates: 39°57′30″N 82°59′58″W

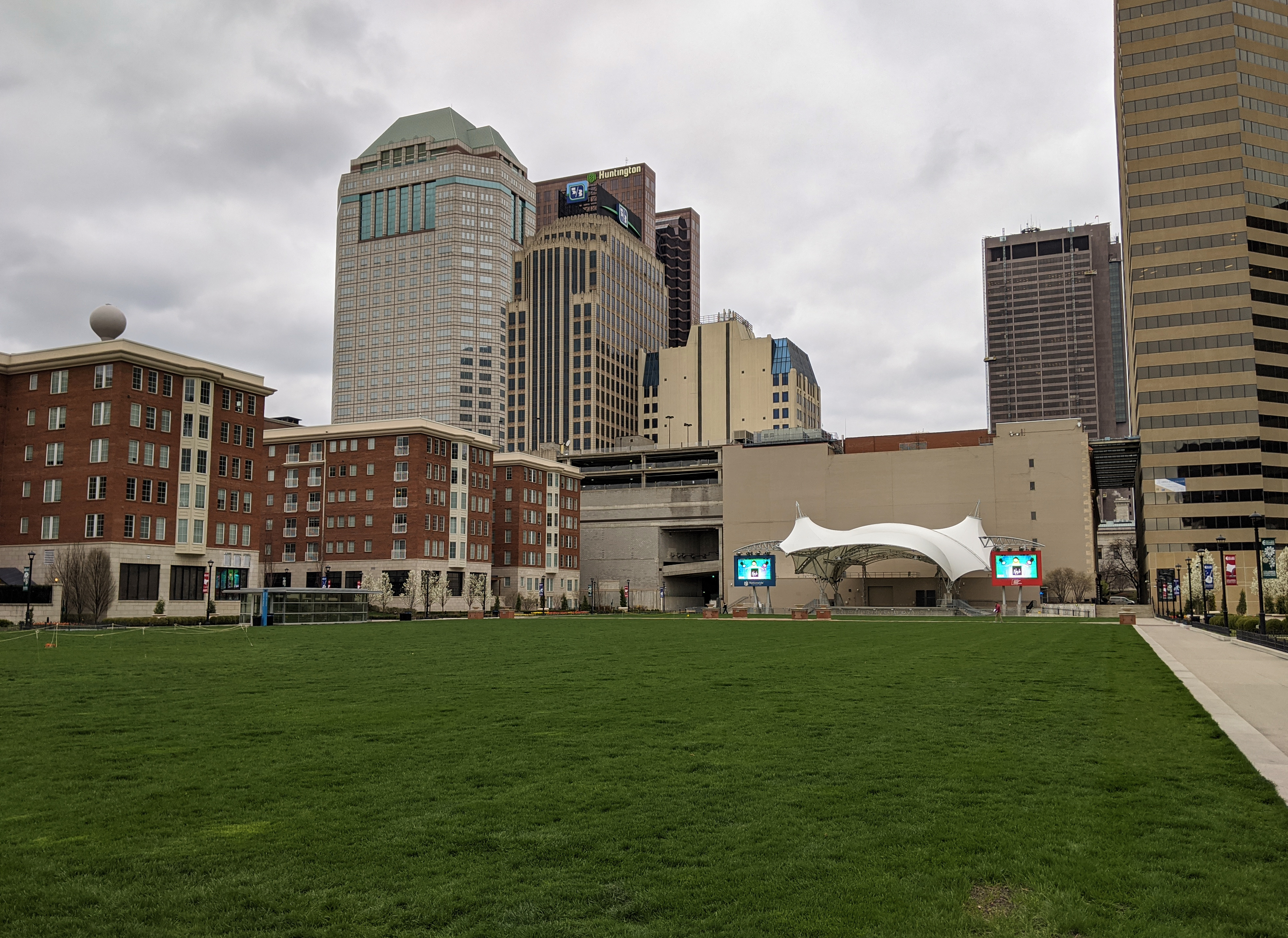
- The apartments (left) front Columbus Commons
- Interactive map of the Highpoint on Columbus Commons area

General information
- Status: Completed
- Type: Mixed-Use, Commercial, Retail, Residential
- Location: Columbus, Ohio

Design and construction
- Developer: Carter,

Website
- https://www.livehighpointcolumbus.com/

Highpoint on Columbus Commons is a $50 million mixed-use development project in Columbus, Ohio consisting of both multi-family and retail space. Highpoint includes 301 apartments and townhomes, built with approximately 23,000 square feet of street-level retail fronting on High Street, the main north–south thoroughfare through Columbus, Ohio. Highpoint on Columbus Commons was the first new residential development to occur at Columbus Commons, a seven-acre site in downtown Columbus that stands at the former site of the Columbus City Center mall.

== History ==
The City of Columbus and the non-profit urban redevelopment entity Capitol South agreed to purchase the abandoned Columbus City Center mall in 2007. In 2009, the City of Columbus, Capitol South and the Columbus Downtown Development Corporation (CDDC) announced plans to demolish the existing structure and develop an urban park surrounded by residential, retail and office components.

Prior to the nine-acre park opening Memorial Day weekend in 2011, Capitol South and CDDC requested proposals for developing the residential and retail component on the west side of the park, now named Columbus Commons. The first round failed to produce a developer willing to meet required design specifications, including red brick exterior, classical design and maintaining dense retail storefronts on High Street. Following a second round of proposals in mid-2011, CDDC and Capitol South selected Atlanta developer Carter as their partner.

Village Green, a property management services company, began leasing efforts in April 2013. The Robert Weiler Company and Jeffrey R. Anderson Real Estate, Inc. are both part of the retail leasing team. Moody Nolan is the architect and Brasfield & Gorrie is the contractor.

In 2016, Oakwood Management Company took over management and leasing operations for the apartment community.

== Construction ==
Atlanta-based Carter announced in 2012 that it would partner with Columbus commercial real estate firm the Robert Weiler Company on the project; construction began in August 2012.

The two six-story buildings include studio, one-bedroom and two-bedroom units. There are 98 units in the north building and 203 units in the south building. Amenities include a resident clubroom, 24-hour athletic facility, pool and outdoor courtyard with BBQ area, complimentary Wi-Fi in common/amenity areas and underground parking.
