= CMAX =

Bus rapid transit line in Columbus, Ohio

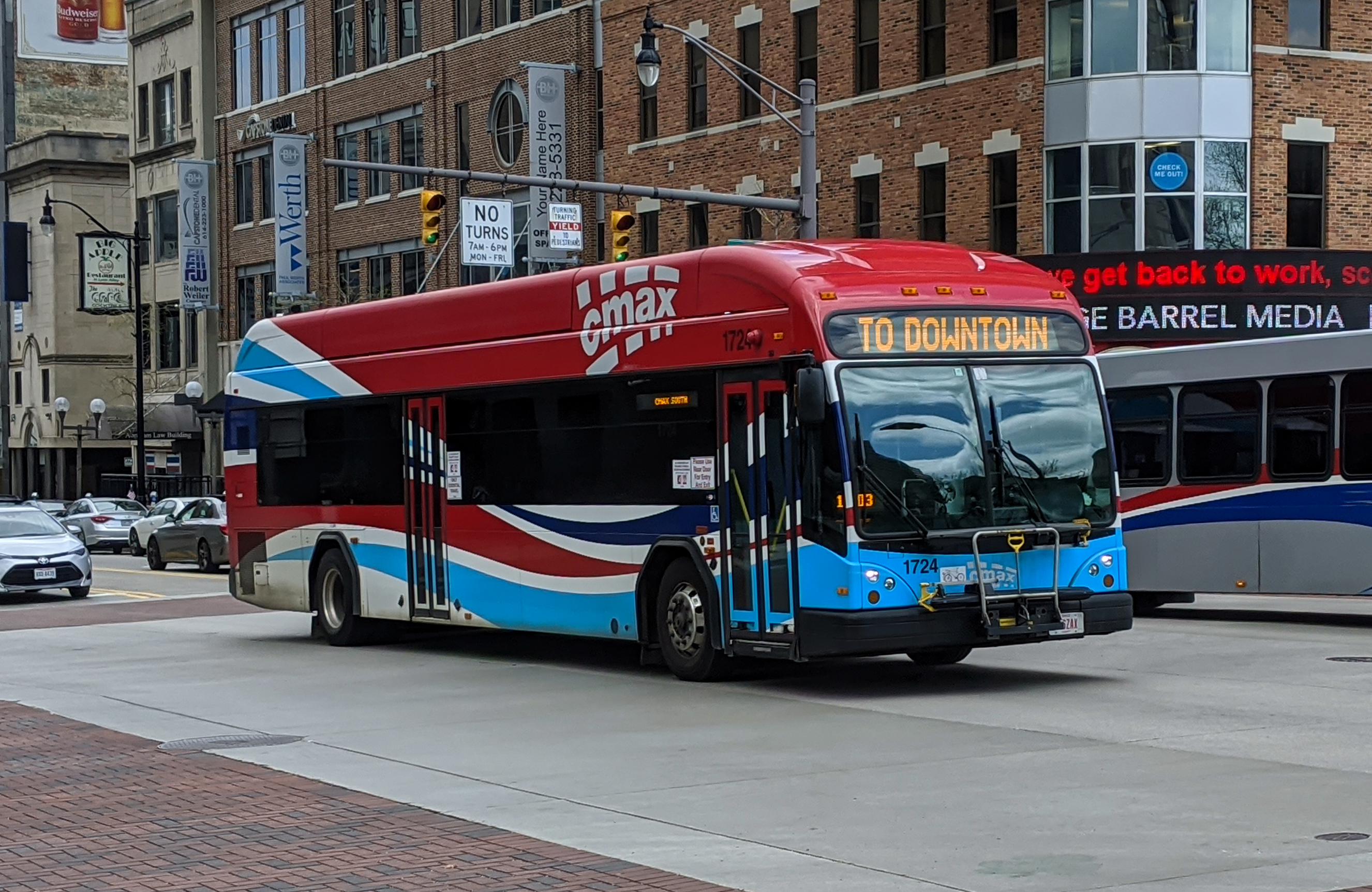

Overview
- Operator: Central Ohio Transit Authority
- Vehicle: Gillig BRT Plus, CNG-fueled, 40-ft buses
- Status: Operational
- Began service: January 1, 2018

Route
- Route type: Bus rapid transit
- Locale: Columbus, Ohio
- Communities served: Downtown Columbus, Milo-Grogan, Linden, Brandywine, Forest Park, Minerva Park, Northern Woods, Westerville
- Start: E. Mound St. & 4th St. (Downtown Columbus)
- Via: Mound St. High St. Nationwide Blvd. Cleveland Ave. Polaris Pkwy.
- End: OhioHealth Westerville Medical Campus (Westerville)
- Length: 15.6 mi (25.1 km)

Service
- Frequency: 10-15 minutes (Downtown to Northland Transit Center); 30 minutes (Northland Transit Center to OhioHealth)
- Journey time: About 56 minutes
- Operates: 7 days per week
- Daily ridership: 3,838 (2025)
- Ridership: 548,108 (2022)
- Timetable: CMAX timetable
- Map: CMAX route map

CMAX is a bus rapid transit (BRT) service in Central Ohio, operated by the Central Ohio Transit Authority (COTA). The line begins in Downtown Columbus, traveling northeast to Westerville. CMAX is Central Ohio's first bus rapid transit line; it began operation in 2018.

== Route and fleet ==
CMAX route map

CMAX runs from Downtown Columbus to Westerville, primarily along Cleveland Avenue and High Street. The route is 15.6 miles (25.1 km) long, with 0.7 miles (1.1 km) of dedicated lanes on High Street, between Spring Street and Main Street. The trip is estimated to take about 56 minutes, depending on the time of day.

Landmarks and parks along the line include Franklin University, the Franklin County Government Center, the South High Commercial Historic District, Columbus Commons, the Ohio Statehouse on Capitol Square, the High and Gay Streets Historic District, Sensenbrenner Park, Battelle Hall and the Greater Columbus Convention Center, the Central Ohio Fire Museum, Columbus State Community College, Fort Hayes, Mount Carmel St Ann's Hospital, Sharon Woods Metro Park, Otterbein University, and the OhioHealth Westerville Medical Campus.

Buses operating the CMAX route have unique livery, and were among the first in the system to include USB charging ports and onboard Wi-Fi. The fleet includes buses 1619-20 (two 40-ft. 2016 Gillig BRT Plus CNG-fueled buses) and 1714-1726 (13 of the same type, issued in 2017).

== BRT attributes ==
The service is estimated to be 20 percent faster than conventional service, due to its use of limited stops, dedicated bus lanes on its High Street portion during rush hours, and utilizing transit signal priority. Most of the stops have covered shelters and information terminals with real-time bus arrival times. Some of the stations feature local art. Between downtown and Northland Transit Center, the buses operate with a 10-minute frequency on weekday mornings and afternoons, 15 minutes during off-peak times, and 30 minutes on weekends.

The CMAX line has not been assessed by the Institute for Transportation and Development Policy (ITDP), which classifies BRT lines. An individual assessment following ITDP's BRT Standard rated the CMAX line in its "Other" category, failing to meet the "Bronze", "Silver", or "Gold" standards for BRT transport. In 2019, TransitColumbus called the service a "great first step", though it criticized the service's lack of bus lanes or busways, enclosed stations, ADA accessibility, and off-board payment, calling it moreso "BRT-lite". The Columbus Dispatch likewise separated the service from "true bus rapid-transit lines" by noting CMAX's lane-sharing with other traffic and its lack of larger stations.

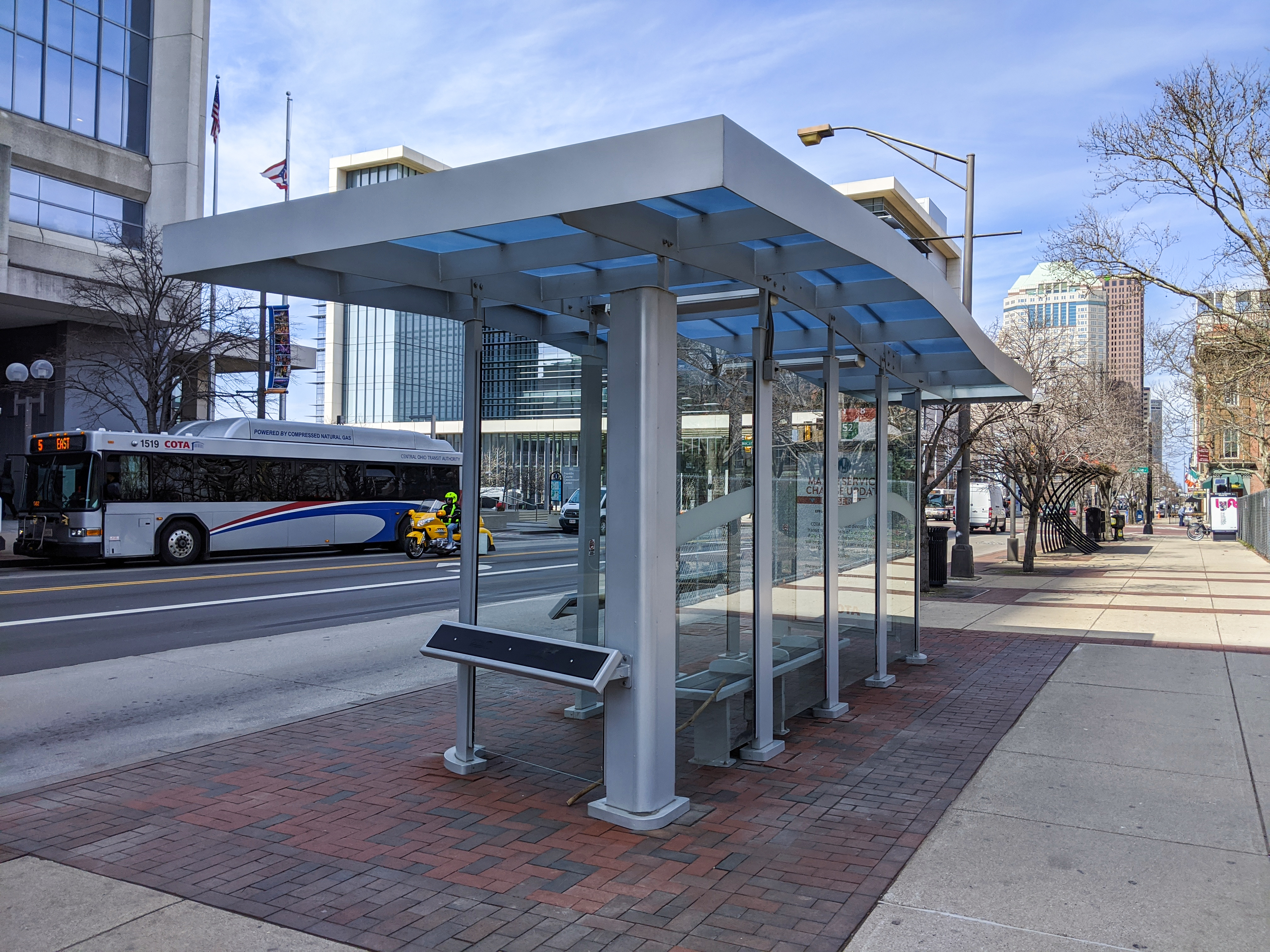
A CMAX bus shelter

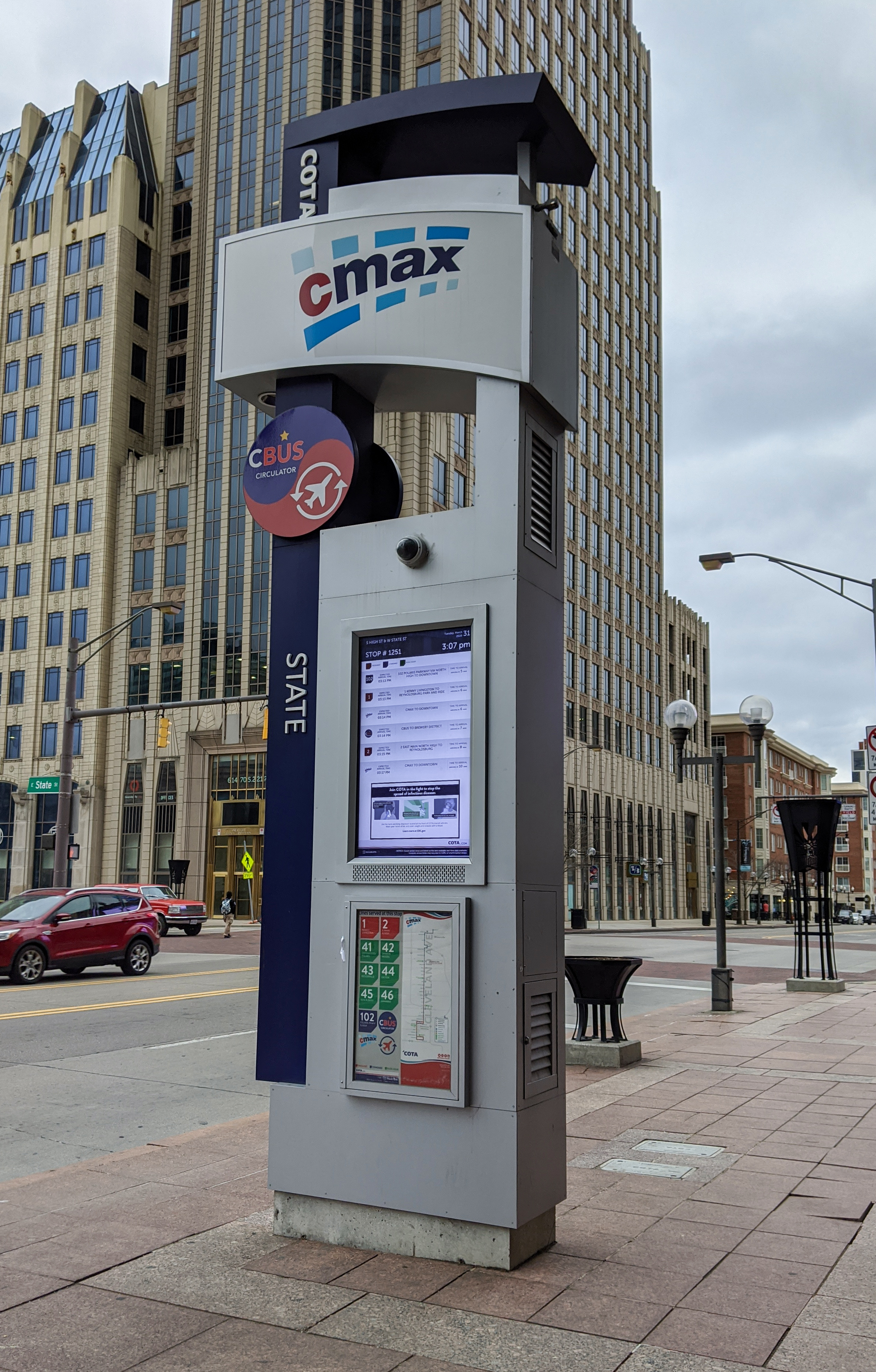
Countdown clock and information terminal

== History ==
The CMAX route primarily operates on Cleveland Avenue, on a former interurban and streetcar route. The Columbus & Westerville Railway Company was granted the right to operate an interurban railroad there in 1893; it later became the Columbus Central Railway Company, and was acquired by the Columbus Railway Company in 1899.

CMAX was planned as early as 2010, when the Central Ohio Transit Authority applied for a Federal Transit Administration grant. CMAX was created with $48.6 million in funding, including $37.4 million from the federal government grant. It was created to help reduce traffic congestion on Cleveland Avenue, bring economic activity, and increase job and healthcare access to low-income and minority neighborhoods on Cleveland Avenue, including Milo-Grogan and Linden. The service complemented and improved COTA's second-busiest route, Local Line 1 Cleveland (present-day route 6). The service began operation on January 1, 2018, and offered free fares in its first week of service.

CMAX ridership is projected to increase in the future. One upgrade COTA proposed in 2016, before the line's opening, was for a future high capacity transit corridor for CMAX. It would re-align the route to utilize the former Mt. Vernon Pennsylvania Railroad line. The line could be used for a dedicated busway or for rail, serving the growing populations in Westerville and Polaris.

== See also ==
- Bus rapid transit creep
- List of bus rapid transit systems in the Americas
- List of COTA bus routes
