= Columbus Streetcar =

Proposed streetcar system in Ohio, US

The Columbus Streetcar was a proposed streetcar system to be located in and around Downtown Columbus, Ohio. Initially planned to run along High Street, the line would have run for 2.8 miles (4.5 km) and connected the Ohio State campus with the Franklin County Government Center. As of February 2009, the plan was indefinitely on hold. Discussion took place for a larger scale light rail system which would run along the streetcar route and also connect the northern part of the city to downtown. In 2014, the CBUS free circulator bus began operation on much of the proposed streetcar route.

== Plans for a modern system ==
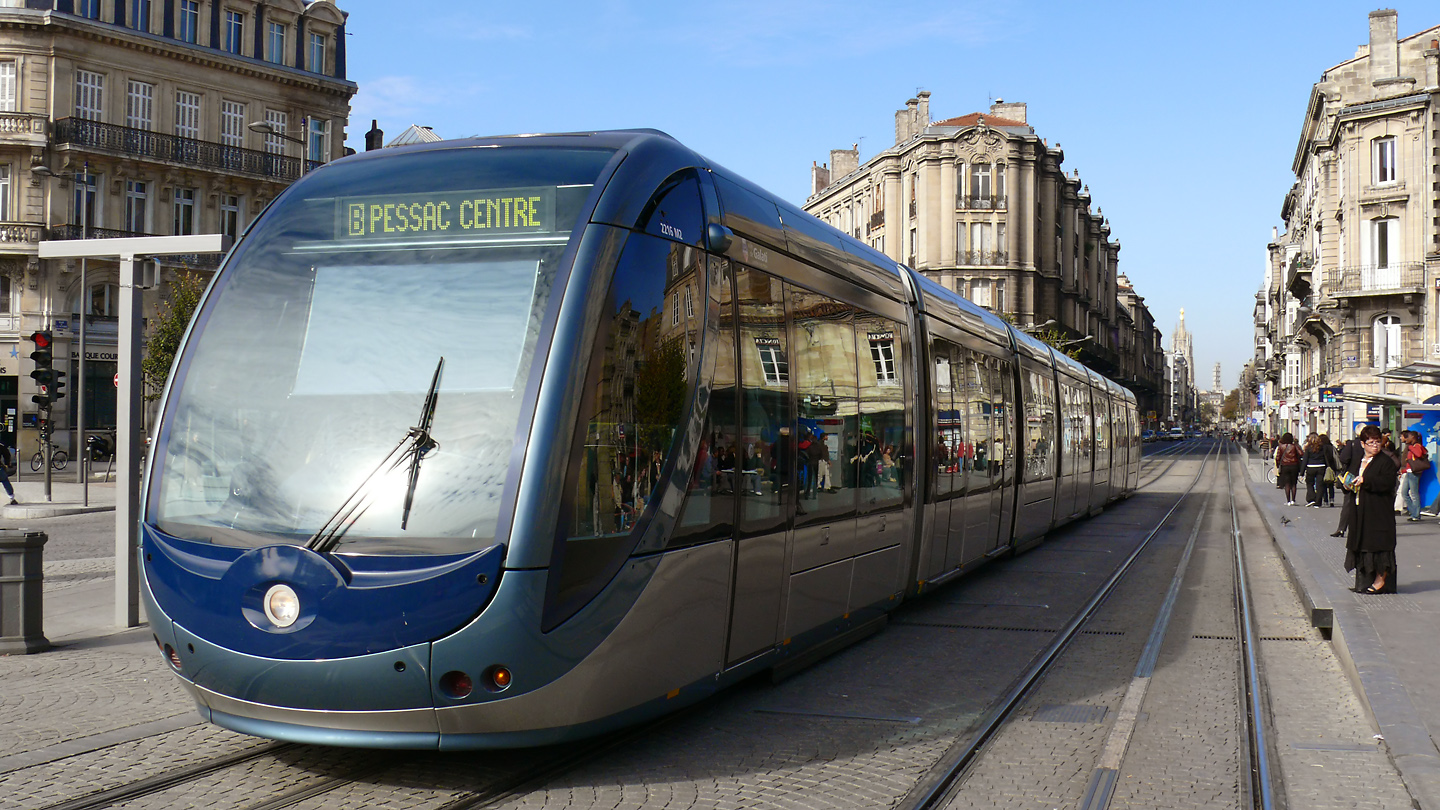
Example of a modern streetcar on the Tramway de Bordeaux

Initially proposed in a February 2006 State of the City speech by Mayor Michael Coleman, the system was touted as a tool to connect the various sections of downtown as well as promote development. On 22 March 2006, the mayor convened a working group consisting of various political and business leaders as well as community stakeholders to investigate the feasibility of returning streetcars to the city. Initially, three routes were proposed. A Blue line route would run along High Street from Frankfort Street in German Village to Buttles Avenue in the Short North. A Red line route would extend the blue line north to 11th Avenue adjacent to the Ohio State campus. A Green Line (initially called the Z-line) would run in a Z pattern from the Arena District to the Discovery District around the Main Library. After the results of the economic study showed 3,000 new downtown jobs, 300 hotel rooms and 1,500 new housing units from the most conservative standpoint, the working group voted overwhelmingly in favor of pursuing a streetcar system in Columbus.

Unlike recently built systems in Kenosha and Little Rock, the Columbus system would not use vintage cars or equipment. Media reports often used the term "trolley" to describe the new system, to which Mayor Coleman publicly stated his dislike. He cited the fact that the system would use modern cars similar to the Portland Streetcar, and would not be intended as a tourist attraction.

The proposal gained support from organizations such as the Columbus chapter of the American Institute of Architects, Experience Columbus, the Ohio Rail Development Commission, COTA, the Building Owners and Managers Association of Columbus, and the Mid-Ohio Regional Planning Commission. In a survey of 1,000 downtown residents, employees, and students, 73% said they would ride the streetcar if it were built. Ridership was projected to be between 5,000 and 7,200 riders per day depending on the final route chosen.

== Funding ==
The initial system was projected to cost approximately US$103 million. Coleman proposed a funding plan which would have relied on fees rather than income or property taxes. The majority of the funding would have come from sources within a "benefit zone" which is the area within six blocks of the route. A 4 percent surcharge would be added to concert, sport, and theater tickets with a face value above $10. Parking meter rates would be raised by 75¢ per hour, and all money from meters in the area would go to funding the streetcar. Off-street parking in lots and garages would also be subject to the 4 percent fee. The Ohio State University pledged to provide $12.5 million over 25 years. Various small federal grants were expected to support the streetcar.

The funding system was designed such that Columbus residents who live in suburban areas far away from the line would not have any of their tax dollars diverted to fund the system.
