= 2 E Main / N High =

Bus line in Columbus, Ohio

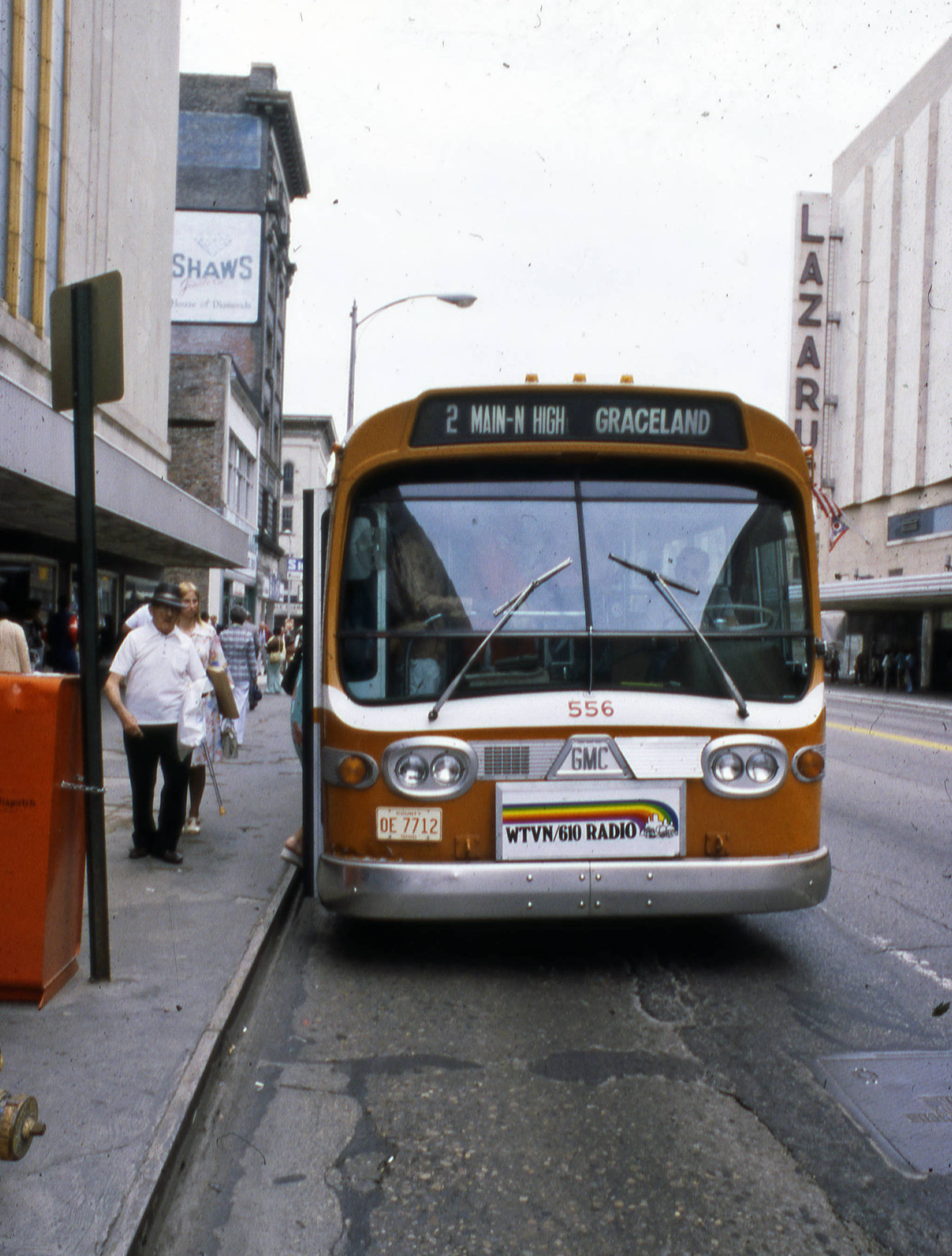
- A 1975 GMC T6H-5307A serving 2 Main-N. High c. 1980

Overview
- Operator: Central Ohio Transit Authority
- Vehicle: Gillig Low Floor and New Flyer XN40 CNG-fueled, 40-ft buses
- Status: In service

Route
- Route type: Frequent local service
- Locale: Columbus, Ohio
- Communities served: Clintonville, Old North Columbus, University District, The Short North, Downtown Columbus, Near East Side, Bexley, East Columbus, Whitehall, Reynoldsburg
- Start: N. High & Fenway (Clintonville)
- Via: High St. E. Mound St. E. Main St.
- End: Hanson & E. Main (Reynoldsburg)
- Length: 19.7 mi (31.7 km)

Service
- Frequency: 15 minutes or better
- Operates: 7 days per week
- Daily ridership: 6,003 (2025)
- Timetable: 2 E Main/N High timetable
- Map: 2 E Main/N High route map

The 2 E Main / N High is a Central Ohio Transit Authority (COTA) bus service in Columbus, Ohio. The line operates on High Street, the city's main north-south thoroughfare.

The 2 replaced High and Main Streets streetcar lines, both of which were early streetcars line in Columbus. These lines initially served Columbus with horsecars, and horse-drawn omnibuses followed a similar route. The horsecars were replaced with electric streetcars around the 1890s, and later with trolleybuses. In the mid-20th century, the trolleybus line was replaced with a bus line similar to the modern-day 2 E Main / N High.

== Attributes ==
The 2 route was the highest-trafficked in 1987 and 1999. It is the busiest bus route in Columbus, carrying an average of 6,003 weekday riders.

In 2008, facing overcrowding, service was doubled on the line. and expanded again in 2019.

The Night Owl line (formerly 21 Night Owl) formerly supplemented 2 E Main / N High with late-night service along High Street before being suspended in March 2020, while the 102 (formerly 2L) provides limited-stop service from Broad and High north to Westerville.

The route is frequented by Ohio State University students, as the campus is on the transit line. In 2000, about a fifth of the average weekday riders on the routes were OSU students.

== History ==
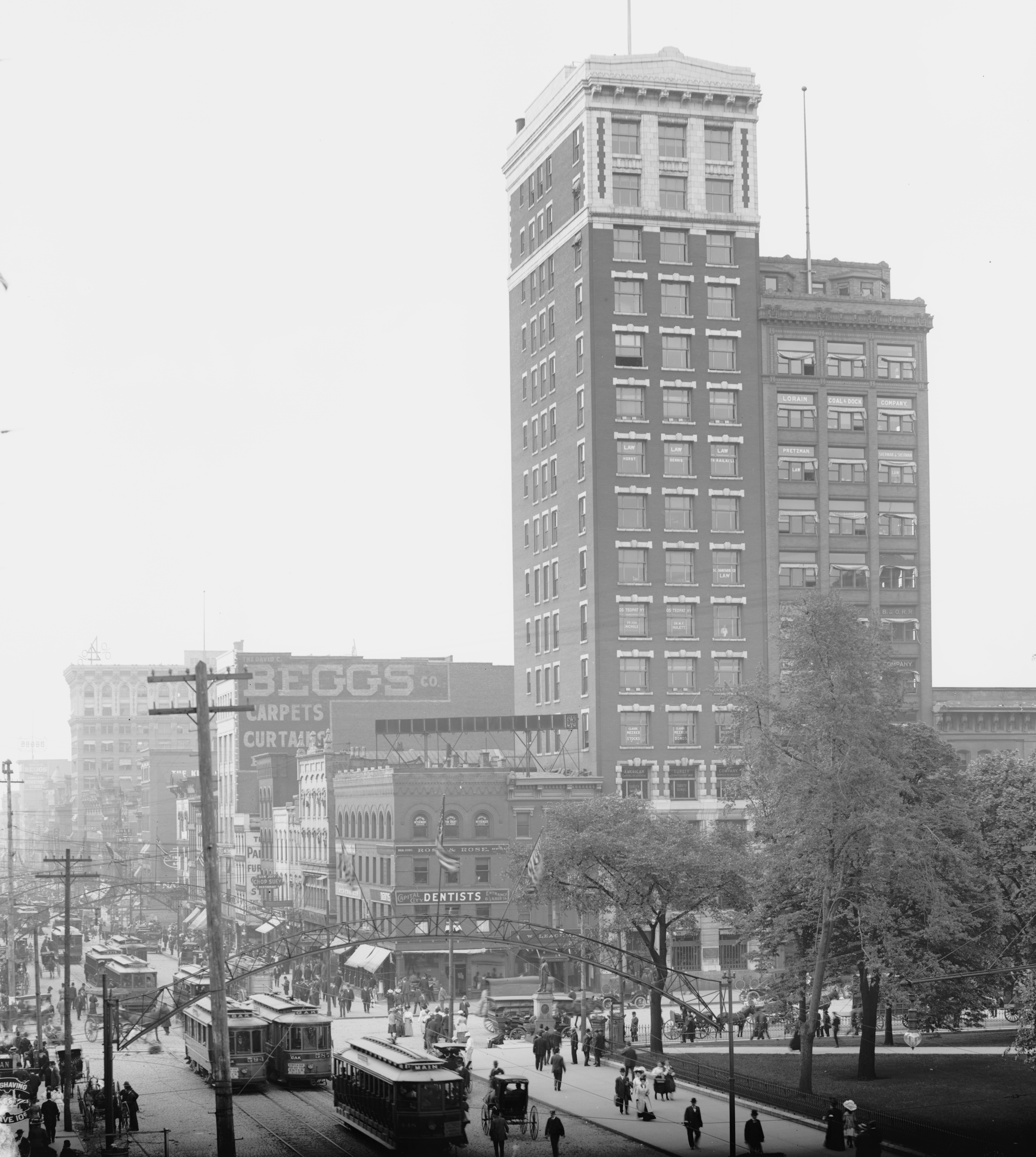
High St. streetcars underneath streetcar arches, c. 1906-15

The first mass transit in Columbus was a horsecar line, which operated along a two-mile stretch on High Street beginning in 1863. The line ran from Union Station at Naughten Street (now Nationwide Boulevard) south to Livingston Avenue.

An initiative from about 2006 to 2009 proposed to bring streetcars back to Columbus. The Columbus Streetcar was proposed for three different routes; the most popular would have been a 2.1-mile route from German Village to the Short North via High Street (the same route the CBUS utilized). The Great Recession affected the city's budget, and paired with a failure to acquire state or federal funding, forced the plan to be cut.

As part of the LinkUS transportation initiative, the East Main Street half of the route will be supplemented by a bus rapid transit route, with route 2 being split in half in Downtown Columbus. The BRT route and the High Street half of the route will additionally have overnight service.

== See also ==
- List of COTA routes and services
- Public transit in Columbus, Ohio
