= List of COTA routes and services =

Interactive map of COTA bus routes Note: not all frequent lines remain frequent throughout their entire routes; see the official map for details.

The Central Ohio Transit Authority (COTA) operates 40 fixed-route bus services throughout the Columbus metropolitan area in Central Ohio. The agency operates its standard and frequent bus services seven days per week, and rush hour service Monday to Friday. All buses and routes are wheelchair and mobility device-accessible, and include front-mounted bike racks.

The authority also operates multiple transit services, including the microtransit service COTA//PLUS and the on-demand COTA Mainstream service.

== List of routes ==
| Line type | Days | Minimum service frequency | No. of routes |
|---|---|---|---|
| Standard line | Mon–Sun | Every 15–30 minutes | 17 |
| Frequent line | Mon–Sun | Every 15 minutes or better | 9 |
| Rush hour line (express) | Mon–Fri | Varies, rush hour times only | 14 |

=== Routes 1–12: through downtown ===
Routes 1 through 12 traverse Downtown Columbus. These routes are classified as local lines.

| No. and designation | | Frequency | Destinations | | | | Area | Ref. |
|---|---|---|---|---|---|---|---|---|
| 1 | Kenny/Livingston | Frequent | NB/WB | To OSU Outpatient Care Dublin | SB/EB | To S Front St & W Sycamore St | Map: Route 1 Kenny/Livingston | |
| 1 | Kenny/Livingston | Frequent | NB/WB | To E Naghten St & N 6th St | SB/EB | To Reynoldsburg Park & Ride | Map: Route 1 Kenny/Livingston | |
| 2 | E Main/N High | Frequent | NB/WB | To N High St & Fenway Rd | SB/EB | To Hanson St & E Main St | Map: Route 2 E Main/N High | |
| 3 | Northwest/Harrisburg | Standard | NB | To Tremont Rd & Langham Rd | SB | To Parkway Centre | Map: Route 3 Northwest/Harrisburg | |
| 4 | Indianola/Lockbourne | Standard | NB | To Boardwalk St & Shapter Ave | SB | To Thimbleberry Rd & Alum Creek Dr | Map: Route 4 Indianola/Lockbourne | |
| 5 | W 5th Ave/Refugee | Standard | NB/WB | To Renner Rd Park & Ride / Lincoln Village | SB/EB | To Gender Road Towne Centre | Map: Route 5 W 5th Ave/Refugee | |
| 6 | Sullivant | Frequent | NB/EB | To Spring Street Terminal | SB/WB | To Lincoln Village | Map: Route 6 Sullivant | |
| 7 | Mt Vernon | Frequent | NB/EB | To Int'l Gateway & Sawyer Rd / Easton Transit Center | SB/WB | To E Mound St & S 4th St | Map: Route 7 Mt Vernon | |
| 8 | Karl/S High/Parsons | Frequent | NB | To Boardwalk St & Shapter Ave | SB | To Great Southern Park & Ride | Map: Route 8 Karl/S High/Parsons | |
| 9 | W Mound/Brentnell | Standard | NB/EB | To Easton Transit Center | SB/WB | To Westwoods Park & Ride | Map: Route 9 W Mound/Brentnell | |
| 10 | E Broad/W Broad | Frequent | WB | To Westwoods Park & Ride | EB | To Limited Brands | Map: Route 10 E/W Broad | |
| 11 | Bryden/Maize | Standard | NB/WB | To N High St & Fenway Rd | SB/EB | To Frebis Ave & Alum Creek Dr | Map: Route 11 Bryden/Maize | |
| 12 | McKinley/Fields | Standard | WB | To McKinley Ave Garage | EB | To Fields Ave Garage | Map: Route 12 McKinley/Fields | |

=== Routes 21–25: north–south ===
Routes 21 through 25 are laid out to connect destinations north and south. These routes are classified as crosstown lines.

| No. and designation | | Frequency | Destinations | | | | Area | Ref. |
|---|---|---|---|---|---|---|---|---|
| 21 | Hilliard Rome | Standard | NB | To Pickforde Dr & Bethel Rd | SB | To Lincoln Village | Map: Route 21 Hilliard Rome | |
| 22 | OSU/Rickenbacker | Standard | NB/WB | To Grandview Yard | SB/EB | To Rickenbacker Mobility Center | Map: Route 22 OSU/Rickenbacker | |
| 23 | James/Stelzer | Frequent | NB | To Easton Transit Center | SB | To Eastland Mall | Map: Route 23 James/Stelzer | |
| 24 | Hamilton Rd | Standard | NB | To Easton Transit Center | SB | To Rickenbacker Mobility Center | Map: Route 24 Hamilton Rd | |
| 25 | Brice | Standard | NB | To Easton Transit Center | SB | To Canal Winchester Park & Ride | Map: Route 25 Brice | |

=== Routes 30–35: west–east ===
Routes 30 through 35 are laid out to connect destinations east and west. These routes are classified as crosstown lines. Route 30 is the only crosstown line to serve Downtown Columbus.

| No. and designation | | Frequency | Destinations | | | | Area | Ref. |
|---|---|---|---|---|---|---|---|---|
| 30 | Hilliard-OSU | Standard | NB/WB | To Heritage Club Dr & Main St | SB/EB | To E Mound St & S 5th St | | |
| 31 | Hudson | Standard | WB/SB | To Grandview Yard | EB/NB | To Easton Transit Center | Map: Route 31 Hudson | |
| 32 | N Broadway | Standard | WB | To Northwest Bl & Giant Eagle | EB | To Easton Transit Center | Map: Route 32 N Broadway | |
| 33 | Henderson | Standard | WB | To Dublin Metro Center / Summer Dr & Sawmill Rd | EB | To N High St & W Kanawha Ave | Map: Route 33 Henderson | |
| 34 | Morse | Frequent | WB | To N High St & Fenway Rd | EB | To Meijer Hamilton Rd | Map: Route 34 Morse | |
| 35 | Dublin-Granville | Standard | WB | To Boardwalk St & Shapter Ave | SB | To New Albany Park & Ride | Map: Route 35 Dublin-Granville | |

=== Routes 41–52: east Columbus ===
Routes 41 through 52 operate on the city's east side; 41 through 46 serve northeast Columbus, while 51 and 52 serve southeast Columbus. These routes are classified as rush hour (express) lines.

| No. and designation | | Frequency | Destinations | | | | Area | Ref. |
|---|---|---|---|---|---|---|---|---|
| 41 | Crosswoods/Polaris | Rush hour | NB | To Crosswoods Park & Ride | SB | To COTA Transit Terminal | Map: Route 41 Crosswoods/Polaris | |
| 42 | Sharon Woods | Rush hour | NB | To Sharon Woods & Skywae Dr | SB | To COTA Transit Terminal | Map: Route 42 Sharon Woods | |
| 43 | Westerville | Rush hour | NB | To Westerville Park & Ride | SB | To COTA Transit Terminal | Map: Route 43 Westerville | |
| 44 | Easton | Rush hour | NB/EB | To Easton Transit Center | SB/WB | To COTA Transit Terminal | Map: Route 44 Easton | |
| 45 | New Albany | Rush hour | NB/EB | To New Albany Park & Ride | SB/WB | To COTA Transit Terminal | Map: Route 45 New Albany | |
| 46 | Gahanna | Rush hour | NB/EB | To Gahanna Park & Ride | SB/WB | To COTA Transit Terminal | Map: Route 46 Gahanna | |
| 51 | Reynoldsburg | Rush hour | WB | To Spring Street Terminal | EB | To Reynoldburg Park & Ride | Map: Route 51 Reynoldsburg | |
| 52 | Canal Winchester | Rush hour | NB/WB | To Spring Street Terminal | SB/EB | To Canal Winchester Park & Ride | Map: Route 52 Canal Winchester | |

=== Routes 61–75: west Columbus ===
Routes 61 through 75 operate on the city's west side; route 61 serves southwest Columbus, while routes 71 through 75 serve northwest Columbus. These routes are classified as rush hour (express) lines.

| No. and designation | | Frequency | Destinations | | | | Area | Ref. |
|---|---|---|---|---|---|---|---|---|
| 61 | Grove City | Rush hour | NB | To Spring Street Terminal | SB | To Grove City Park & Ride | Map: Route 61 Grove City | |
| 71 | Hilliard | Rush hour | NB/WB | To Hilliard Park & Ride | SB/EB | To COTA Transit Terminal | Map: Route 71 Hilliard | |
| 72 | Tuttle | Rush hour | NB | To 5139 Park Center Ave | SB | To COTA Transit Terminal | Map: Route 72 Tuttle | |
| 73 | Dublin | Rush hour | NB | To Dublin Park & Ride | SB | To COTA Transit Terminal | Map: Route 73 Dublin | |
| 74 | Smoky Row | Rush hour | NB | To Sawmill Rd & Hard Rd | SB | To COTA Transit Terminal | Map: Route 74 Smoky Row | |
| 75 | Arlington/1st Ave | Rush hour | NB | To Nottingham & Riverside Dr | SB | To COTA Transit Terminal | Map: Route 75 Arlington/1st Ave | |

=== Other routes ===
| Designation | Service type | Frequency | Destinations | | | | Area | Ref. |
|---|---|---|---|---|---|---|---|---|
| CMAX | BRT line | Frequent | NB | To Polaris Pkwy & Africa Rd | SB | To E Mound St & S 4th St | Map: CMAX | |
| 102 Polaris Pkwy/N High | Limited-stop | Standard | NB | To Meijer & Polaris Woods | SB | To E Mound St & S 5th St | Map: 102 Polaris Pkwy/N High | |
| ZOO BUS | Seasonal | Standard | NB | To Columbus Zoo | SB | To E State St & N High St | | |

== Services ==
The Central Ohio Transit Authority operates multiple services without fixed routes.

COTA Plus, stylized as COTA//PLUS, is a microtransit service in Grove City and northeast Franklin County. The service enables people to use a mobile app or call COTA's customer service to arrange a trip within service zones created for Grove City and northeast Franklin County. Fares are different from fixed-route COTA services, with single fares at $3, day passes at $6, and weekly passes at $20. C-Pass holders, university students, children, and those with discount IDs receive free or reduced fares relative to their eligibility for other COTA services. The service was first launched in Grove City in July 2019, and expanded with a three-month pilot to the northeast portion of Columbus and Franklin County in May 2020, following service reductions due to the 2019-20 coronavirus pandemic.

COTA Mainstream is an on-demand shared-ride program for riders with disabilities.

Seasonal or event-based services include the summertime "Zoo Bus" to the Columbus Zoo, the "Bus it to the Buckeyes" service for Ohio State University football games at the Ohio Stadium, and the "Zoom to Boom" service to the city's July 4 fireworks show Red, White & Boom.

== History ==
In 1993, COTA began its first "COTA LINK" circulator route, operating in Downtown Columbus. The agency began other circulators, including Easton, Broad Street, and Westerville services around 2000. These services were cut around 2004.

COTA began operating the CBUS service, a free downtown circulator, on May 5, 2014. The route succeeded the downtown COTA LINK service. In May 2016, COTA began its AirConnect service between downtown and John Glenn Columbus International Airport, available with the $2.75 rush hour service fare. Previously, the agency offered a similar service with a $5 fare from 2001 to 2003, cut due to low ridership. On May 1, 2017, the agency overhauled its bus network, the first redesign since COTA's establishment in 1971. The effort simplified routes, increased bus frequency, connected more locations, and reduced bus congestion in downtown Columbus. The redesign doubled the agency's number of frequent lines and significantly increased weekend service.

COTA began its CMAX service, the first bus rapid transit service in Columbus, on January 1, 2018. In 2019, COTA ended its OSUAir service that connected Ohio State University directly with the Columbus airport, citing low ridership amid other bus route options.

During the COVID-19 pandemic, the majority of the agency's services were suspended. This included all express services, AirConnect, CBUS, and the Night Owl service. COTA restored the express lines in May 2021, reinstating 90 percent of the agency's former services.
