= George Floyd protests in Columbus, Ohio =

2020 civil unrest in Columbus, Ohio after the murder of George Floyd

- Part of George Floyd protests in Ohio
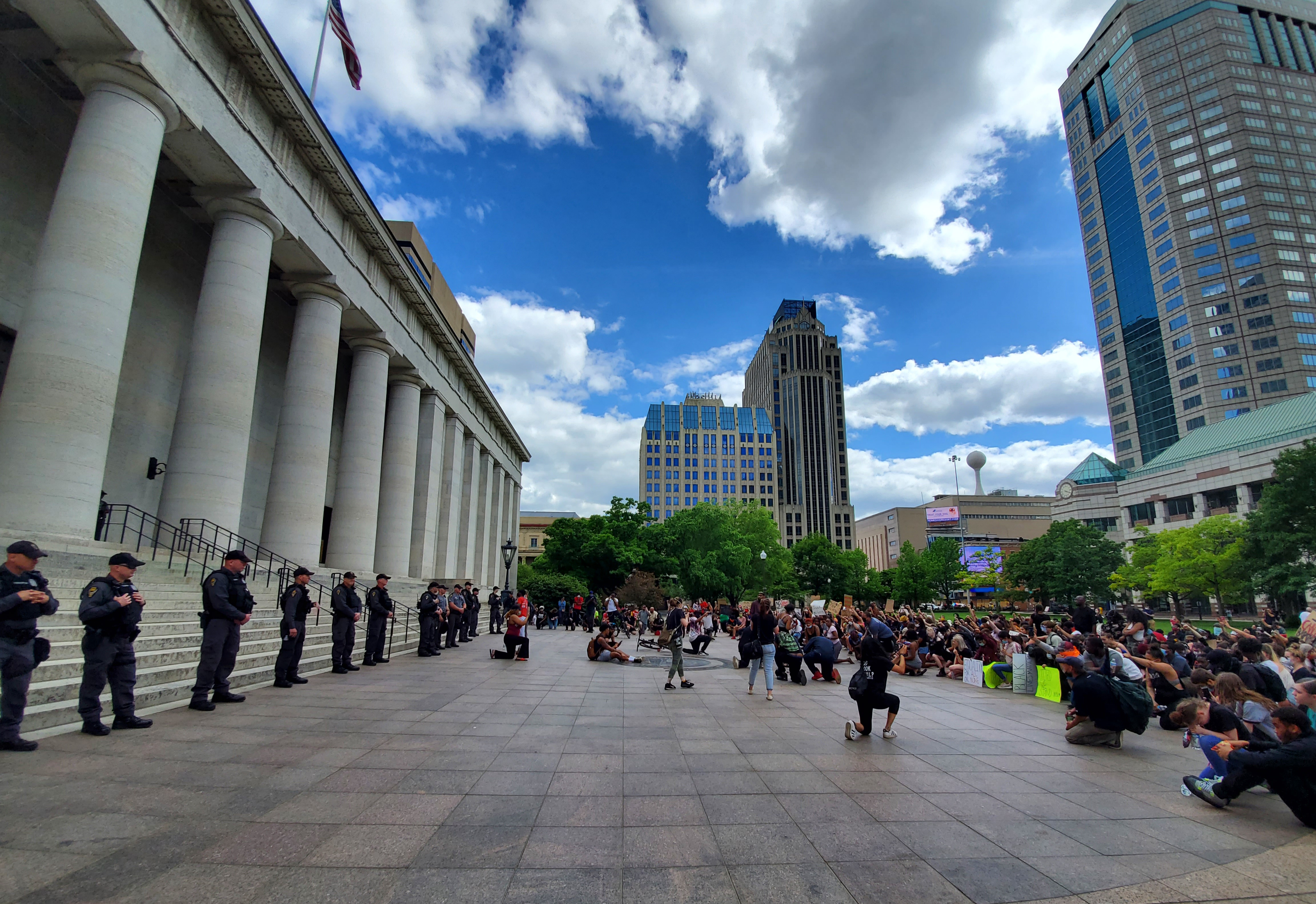
- Protesters at the Ohio Statehouse, May 30
- Date: May 28, 2020 – c. 2021
- Location: Downtown Columbus, Ohio, The Short North, the South Side
- Caused by: Police brutality; Institutional racism against African Americans; Reaction to the murder of George Floyd by Minneapolis Police Department; Economic, racial and social inequality
- Methods: Demonstrations, riots, civil disobedience, civil resistance, looting, and property damage

Parties
Protesters (no centralized authority): People's Justice Project; Columbus Freedom Coalition; Black Freedom; Other local groups	Authorities: Ohio General Assembly; Ohio National Guard (May 30-June 10); Columbus Division of Police

Injuries and arrests
- Arrested: 98

The George Floyd protests were a series of protests and civil disturbances that initially started in the Minneapolis–Saint Paul metropolitan area of Minnesota, United States, before spreading nationwide. In Columbus, Ohio, unrest began on May 28, 2020, two days after incidents began in Minneapolis. The events were a reaction to the murder of George Floyd by Minneapolis Police Department (MPD) officer Derek Chauvin, who knelt on Floyd's neck for over nine minutes, asphyxiating him.

Protests were centered in downtown Columbus, the Short North, and the South Side; within Downtown, most were held around Capitol Square, spreading to surrounding streets. In the first few days, the protests and riots were met with a heavy police presence, although over 100 businesses were vandalized, along with numerous government buildings. On May 30, Columbus issued an indefinite curfew, and Governor Mike DeWine ordered the Ohio National Guard to maintain order in the city. The curfew and the city's state of emergency were believed to be the first in 50 years.

Protesters' tactics primarily included picketing, marches, and die-ins, including shouting, speeches, and chants. A few more agitated events involved protesters throwing water bottles, rocks and bricks, and launching fireworks into lines of police. Officers, mounted police, and SWAT used pepper spray, tear gas, rubber and wooden pellets, and flashbangs to drive them back, and sometimes to attack those protesting non-violently. Columbus's police chief, along with Mayor Andrew Ginther, stated there was evidence that some demonstrators protesting and rioting were from outside the community or state, including from the group Anonymous, turning the protests increasingly violent.

Protests began to drop in violence around May 31, and the city began making changes to support racial equality. On June 1, the city declared racism a public health crisis, and police chief Thomas Quinlan and other officers marched with protesters for the first time. Mayor Ginther also created an independent review system for police aggression that has taken place during the protests. On June 2, Ginther joined Quinlan in the protests. The city-wide curfew was lifted on June 6.

== Background ==
The George Floyd protests were an ongoing series of protests and civil disturbances that initially started in the Minneapolis–Saint Paul metropolitan area of Minnesota, United States, before spreading nationwide. In Columbus, Ohio, unrest began on May 28, 2020, two days after incidents began in Minneapolis. The events were a reaction to the murder of George Floyd by Minneapolis Police Department (MPD) officer Derek Chauvin, who knelt on Floyd's neck for over nine minutes, asphyxiating him.

The events began amid the COVID-19 pandemic, which has affected the city of Columbus along with the rest of the United States and most of the world. The protests involved large numbers of people in close proximity, creating fears the virus will spread and create new outbreaks. On June 3, Columbus Public Health identified a person who attended protests in downtown Columbus, despite feeling coronavirus symptoms on May 27, one day before protests had started downtown.

== Timeline ==
=== May ===
==== May 28 ====
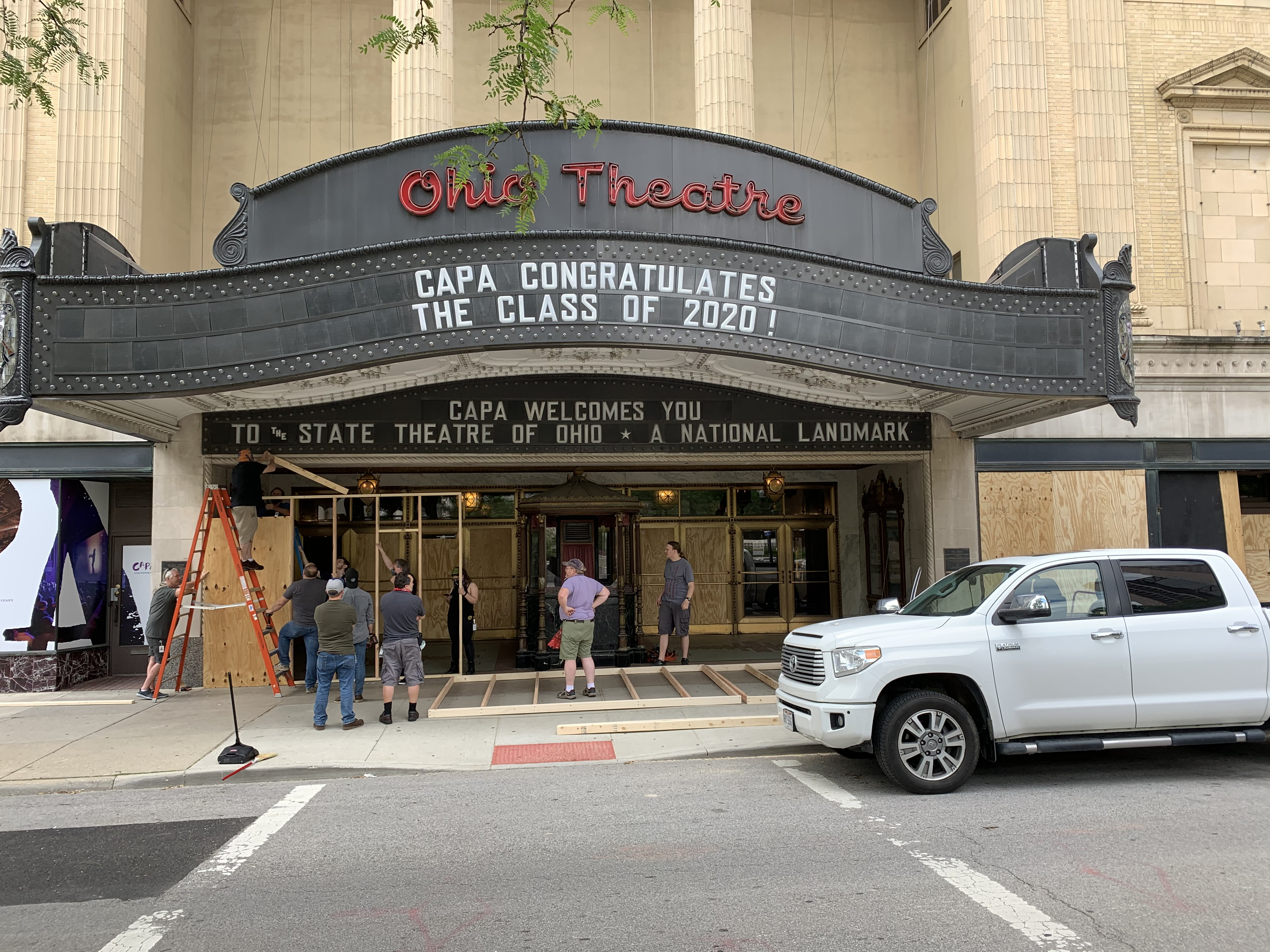
Boarding up the Ohio Theatre after May 28 damage

Protests began at Broad & High Streets, the two main intersections of Columbus, and the location of the Ohio Statehouse. It began peacefully, though into the night the protests became violent. At around 7 p.m. EDT, some protesters blocked traffic on Interstate 71. Around 9 p.m. some protesters began to throw bottles. Protesters shouted, threw water bottles, eggs, shoes, and rocks, and launched fireworks into lines of police, while officers, mounted police, and SWAT used pepper spray, rubber and wooden pellets, flashbangs to drive them back. Some protesters threw the pepper spray back at police officers. Some tore trash cans and mailboxes from their mountings. Around 11:30, protesters used trash cans to smash the Statehouse's windows, and attempted to enter through its High Street doors (locked to the public for years). One person managed to enter the state auditor's ceremonial office through a window, though they left as soon as state troops arrived, and was arrested outside the building. Two lamps, over a century old, had their glass smashed, which may be difficult to replace. Small flags for forgotten soldiers on the east side of the building were set on fire; the remaining ones were brought inside by a Statehouse grounds crew. 28 Statehouse windows were shattered on May 28, along with the west doors, five pole lamps, some granite, and a bench. The Ohio Theatre, including its historic ticket office, had glass smashed in. The Columbus Association for the Performing Arts estimated the damage at $15,000. Numerous other buildings suffered damage.

As protesters were dispersed, a group of about 400 went south down High Street to the Franklin County Courthouse, with some breaking windows as they passed by. The downtown DGX store, part of the Dollar General chain, was looted. Around midnight, more Columbus police and Ohio Highway patrol officers were called in to further disperse those who were vandalizing.

==== May 29 ====
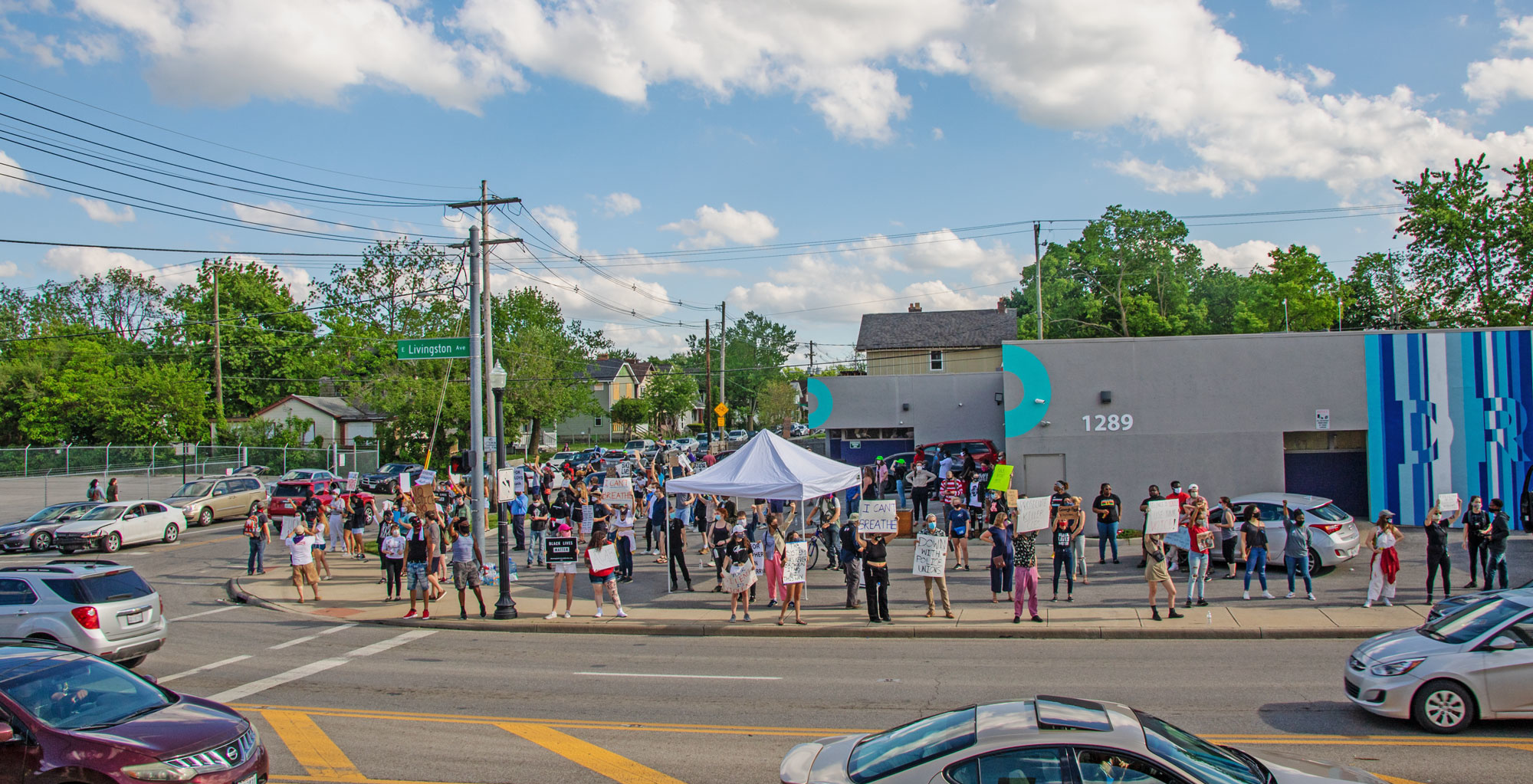
May 29 protest at Livingston and Lockbourne Avenues

In the afternoon, Governor DeWine encouraged people to protest, but urged them to peacefully.

Protesters gathered at Livingston and Lockbourne Avenues in Columbus's South Side in the evening, in a peaceful protest with signs and chanted slogans. In the evening, community leaders met at the Lincoln Theatre along with Columbus City Council President Shannon Hardin and Nick Bankston, president of the Columbus Urban League Young Professionals. The leaders acknowledged the damage, with some urging people to look beyond the damage, and others not condoning intentional property damage.

Hundreds of people arrived downtown later in the evening. Columbus Police set up numerous choke points to control traffic and block protesters. Around 10 p.m., an emergency was declared, with police ordering protesters and reporters to leave the area. At around 11 p.m., officers began firing tear gas to disperse the crowd of over 100. Cars and pedestrians dispersed, some south, some north. Protesters sprayed a statue on the Ohio Judicial Center and tore out planted shrubs.

Columbus City Council held a press conference in the evening, with support of protesting, though urging for nonviolence. Over 100 properties were damaged throughout the night. Five people were arrested that day for setting off fireworks and creating a panic, and five police officers were injured, at least two by rocks and bricks thrown at them.

Harvard University basketball player Seth Towns, who had just recently graduated from the Ivy League school and will play for Ohio State University as a graduate student, was detained at the rally.

==== May 30 ====
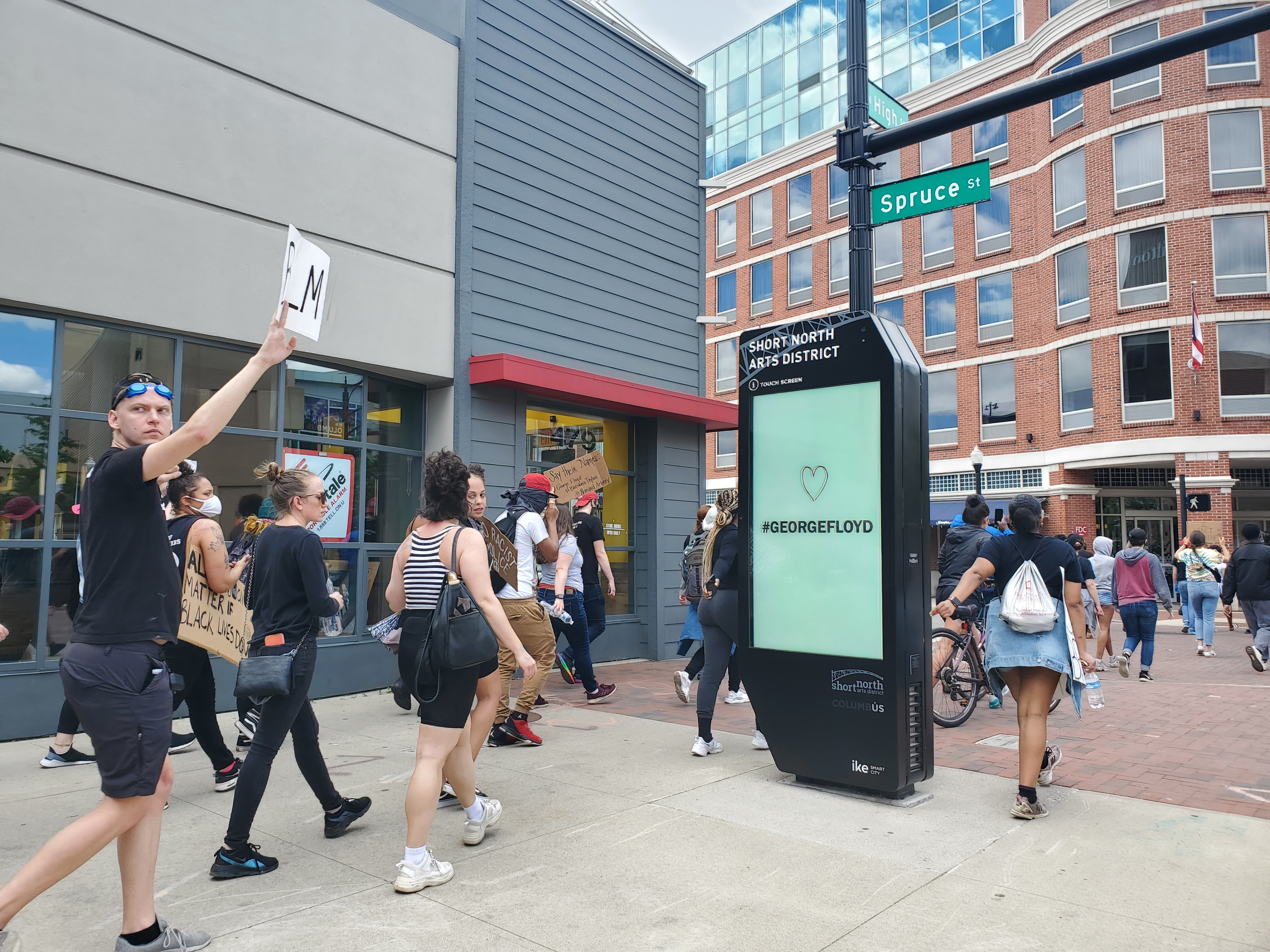
May 30 protests: in the Short North

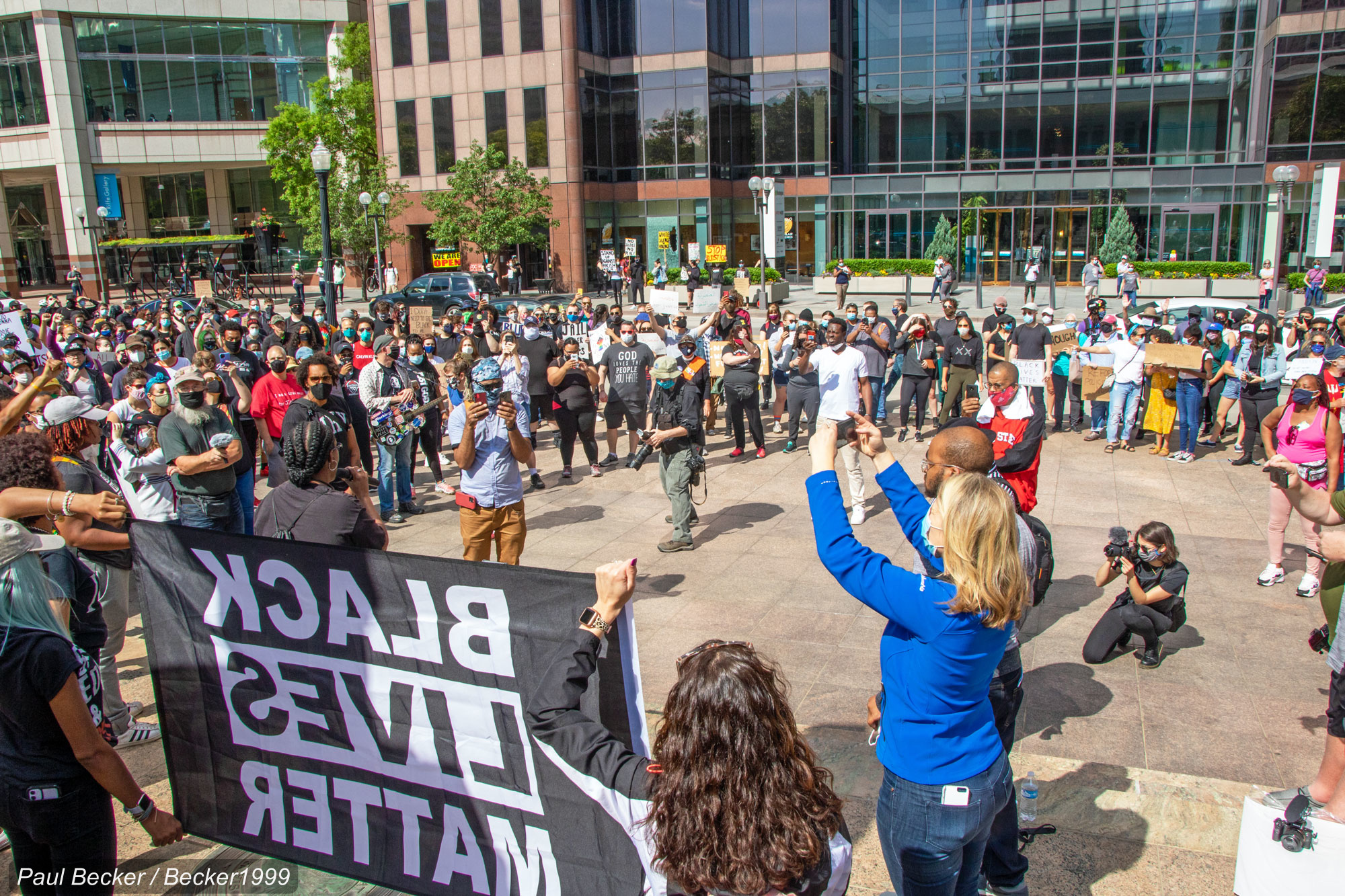
At the Statehouse

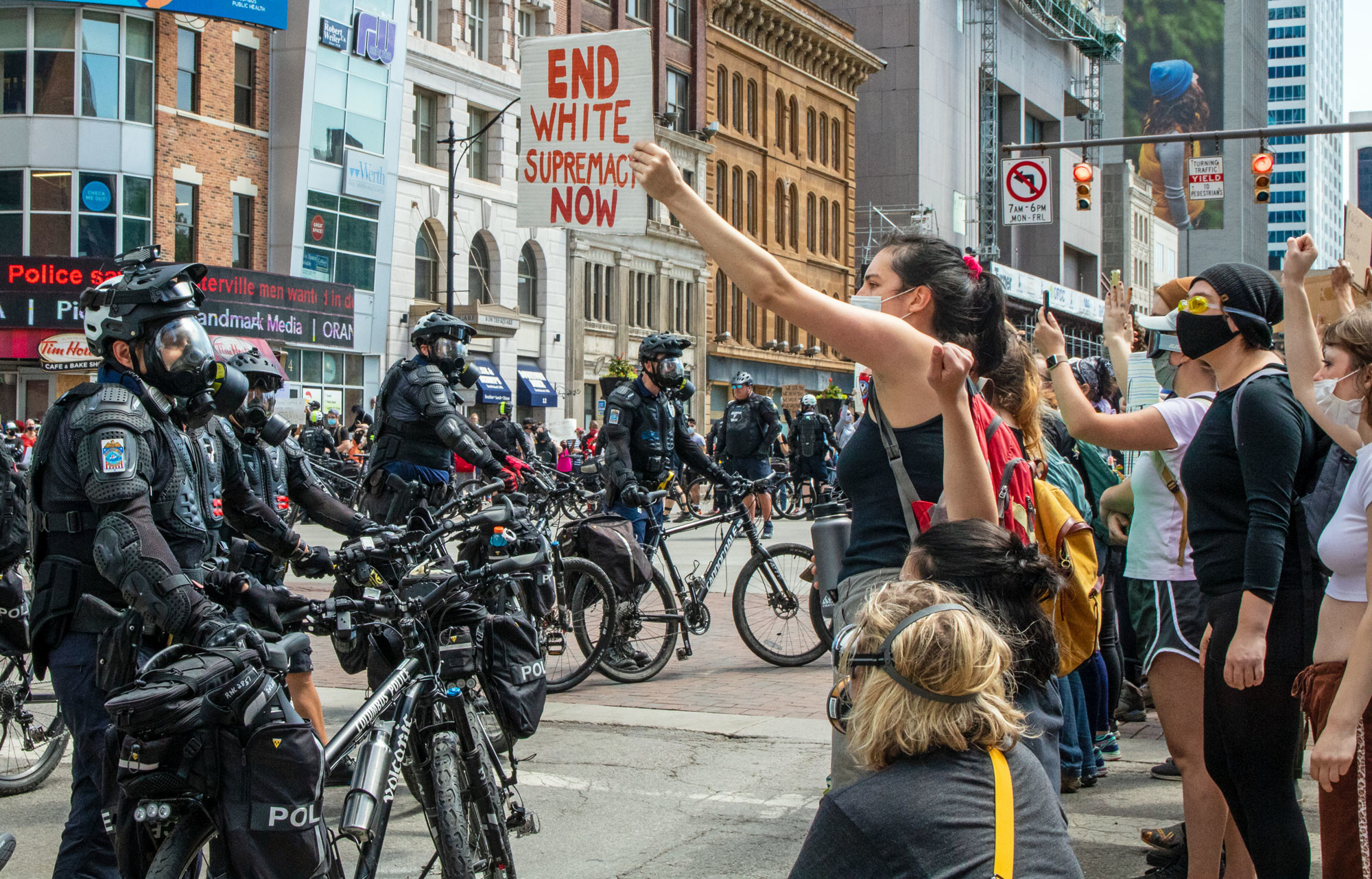
At Broad and High

In the morning of May 30, business owners began to clean up their vandalized businesses. One business reported that they hadn't had a problem with vandalism like this in their 40 years of operating. Bricks, rocks, pieces of granite, water bottles, and other debris lined the streets, while few storefronts were left untouched. Most windows were smashed, with graffiti on signs, walls, and windows across downtown. Milestone 229, at Bicentennial Park, had planned to reopen June 1, though the building was looted, stifling their reopening plans and causing significant damage. As well, it was announced in the morning that COTA, the city's local transit agency, would reroute all of its buses on May 30 around downtown, with no buses traveling through the affected areas.

Thousands of protesters continued demonstrating beginning at 10 a.m. at the Ohio Statehouse, relatively peacefully yet still tense. Protesters were estimated at 2,000 people, more than previous days. Police aggression was reported, including pepper spraying, tear gas, and shoving people to the ground. Some politicians were with protesters early in the day, including Ohio U.S. Representative Joyce Beatty, Columbus City Council President Shannon Hardin, and Franklin County Commissioner Kevin Boyce. The three were hit with pepper spray by police around noon. At about 1:30 p.m., the city of Columbus issued an emergency declaration, advising people to avoid the area.

By 3 p.m., Governor Mike DeWine called in the Ohio National Guard, with Ohio Highway Patrol officers to help with law enforcement. Police were unable to respond to regular calls due to the protests. Mayor Andrew Ginther declared a curfew for 10 p.m. to 6 a.m. until things calm down, with any violators subject to arrest. The curfew excludes emergency services, news media, people traveling directly to or from work, and people seeking care, in dangerous circumstances, or experiencing homelessness. All downtown streets were indefinitely closed to non-emergency traffic at 6 p.m. The curfew and the city's state of emergency were believed to be the first in 50 years, since Mayor Sensenbrenner imposed a curfew in 1970 during violent protests at the Ohio State University campus.

Protests into the night involved demonstrators throwing items including rocks, water bottles, a traffic cone, a bottle of urine, and a bag of rocks. Around 9:35 p.m., the city responded to a trash fire at a construction site downtown, near where protests were held. The curfew went into effect for the first time at 10 p.m. on May 30. 59 people were arrested following the May 30 protests.

==== May 31 ====
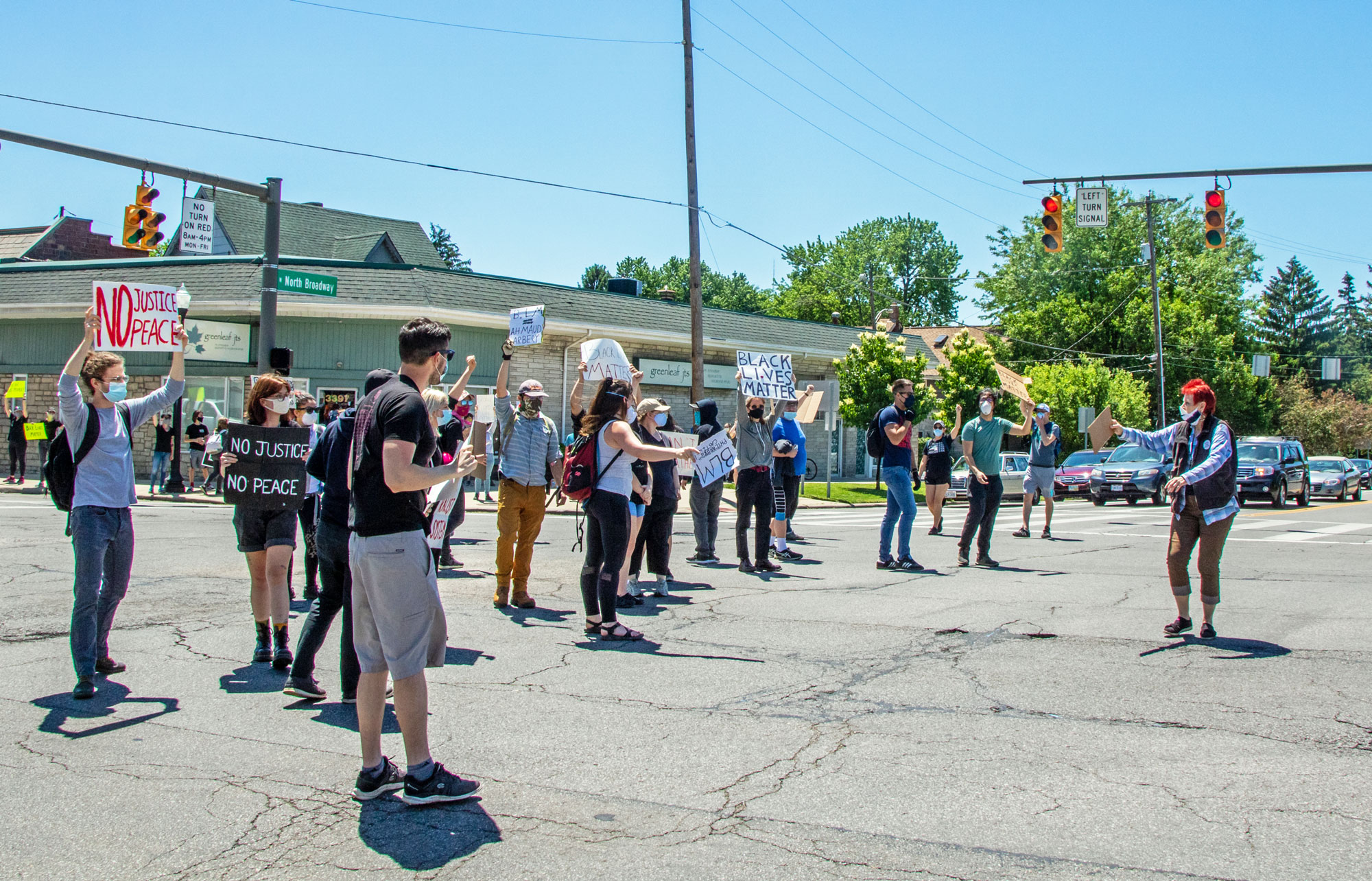
May 31 protest in Clintonville

Video of downtown protests

A nearly-completed apartment complex near Topiary Park caught on fire, with its roof collapsed. The fire is under investigation, and may be related to the protests happening. Ohio Attorney General Dave Yost began sweeping up debris in Capitol Square early in the day, asking others to join him. Around noon, Hardin and Beatty, two of the politicians caught in police pepper spray on the previous day, made a statement supporting a civilian review commission to review police force, instead of allowing the department to investigate its own officers. They support immediate police reform, beyond commissions and studies into the issues. Hundreds gathered at the Ohio Statehouse in the morning into the afternoon for a fourth continuous day of protests. They were joined by members of the local Shiloh Christian Center, who gathered to pray for peace. Protests continued into the evening. Some protesters threw water bottles at police officers.

=== June ===
==== June 1 ====
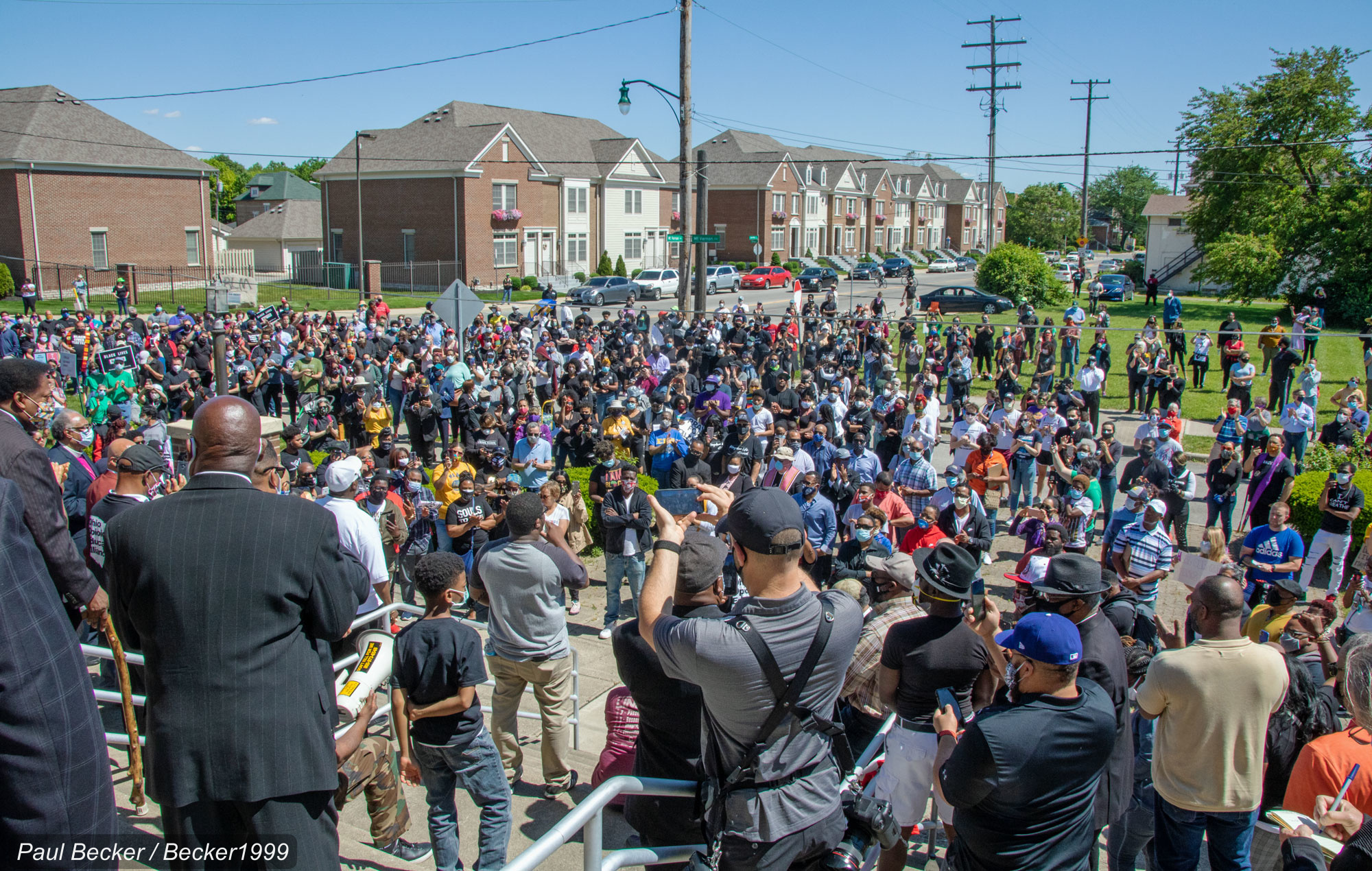
June 1 city-wide prayer gathering

Protests took place in downtown Columbus as well as at the Ohio State University; the protests at the university were the first since George Floyd's murder.

The Ohio Judicial Center was closed on June 1 due to vandalism committed during the riots. The damage includes broken windows and graffiti messages such as "Fuck 12," "BLM," and "ACAB." Columbus Police Chief Thomas Quinlan and several other police officers joined protesters.

Mayor Andrew Ginther and Columbus City Council denounced the police chief and his officers for their aggressive tactics. Ginther created an independent review board for police actions: he asks protesters to report instances of excessive force by police during the protests, to be reviewed by a civilian from the Department of Public Safety's Equal Employment Opportunity Compliance Office. On the same day, the city of Columbus declared racism a public health crisis, following Franklin County, which had done the same earlier that month. Over 1,200 people signed a letter of support of the city's declaration, many of whom were local business, institution, and nonprofit leaders.

A group of protesters created a committee to call for the resignation of the mayor and chief of police; echoed by Stonewall Columbus's call for the police chief to resign on the same day.

A protest near OSU lasted about 25 minutes past the city's curfew, until being broken up by police. The peaceful protest had about 200 participants. Police Chief Thomas Quinlan was marching with the crowd earlier in the day.

11 arrests were made for curfew violations in the evening of June 1. On the same night, student newspaper journalists from the Ohio State University were pepper-sprayed by police. The students, representing The Lantern newspaper, had shown their press credentials and were exempt from the city's curfew as journalists; officers replied with statements including that they "don't care" and to "get inside."

==== June 2 ====
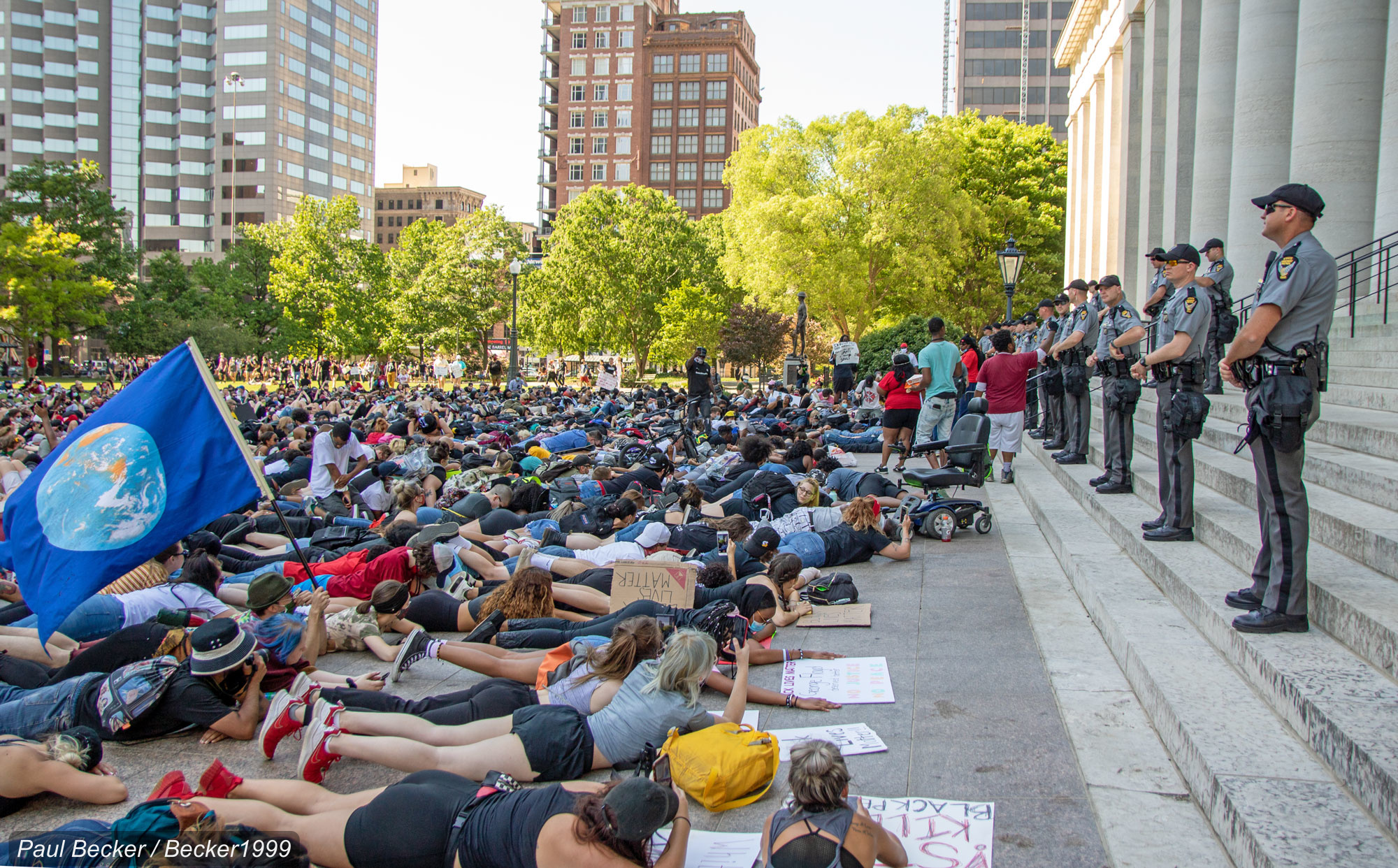
Die-in at the Ohio Statehouse, June 2

In the morning, Mayor Ginther and Police Chief Thomas Quinlan answered questions about the protests. Quinlan defended his officers' use of tear gas and pepper spray, stating that it helps disperse crowds without a need for arrests, charges, courtroom appearances, and further actions. Quinlan stated he just wants violent protesters to "leave and stop damaging our city".

Protests continued peacefully at the Ohio Statehouse on the sixth consecutive day of protests, and were again held at the Ohio State University. There was no visible Columbus police presence at the Ohio Statehouse, given the change in tactics to prevent confrontations and violence. Mayor Ginther, Police Chief Thomas Quinlan, and other officers walked with protesters during evening protests. Protests were mostly peaceful. The majority of protesters left after the 10 p.m. curfew set in, while some continued to walk from Broad and High to Hudson Street. Some protesters continued on to the I-71 on-ramp before police arrived and blocked the ramp.

The Columbus Urban League met with City Council President Shannon Hardin; the organization announced steps to address racial disparities, including seeking partnerships with the city's police union, and with other police, government, business, and nonprofit leaders. They also recommended implementing recommendations given in recent reports on the city's police reform, as well as advocating for Ohio to follow Columbus and Franklin County in declaring racism a public health crisis. Lastly, they recommended joining with city and county leaders to address health disparities between races in the area.

==== June 3 ====
A two-hour protest was staged at Mayor Andrew Ginther's home at The Knolls, a subdivision in northwest Columbus. More than 100 attended, and participated in a lie-in, lying down for the 8 minutes, 46 seconds that George Floyd was pinned down before he died. Police drove by, though there was no interaction with the crowd; the mayor was reportedly attending a prayer service elsewhere at the time.

Protests downtown were smaller than previous days, at 300–400 by the afternoon, though more joined later into the evening. The group met at the William McKinley Monument, and marched two miles east down Long Street before returning.

==== June 4 ====
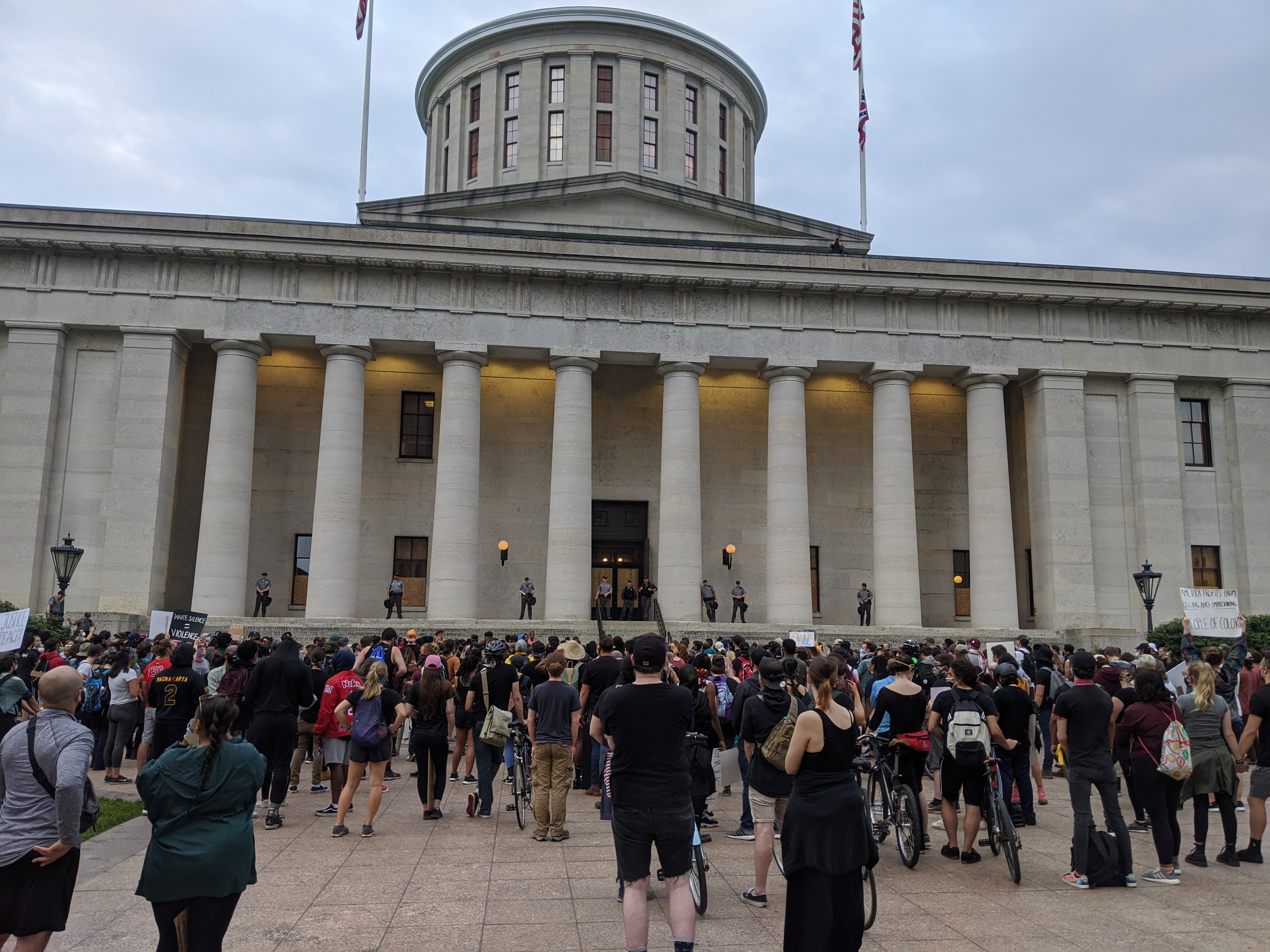
Protest on June 4

June 4 was noted as significantly calmer than previous days of protest. The protest sites in the morning and early afternoon were largely empty. About 100 people protested on High Street by the Statehouse, while others painted murals - the Huntington Center has a large plywood wall around it, and encouraged the Greater Columbus Arts Council to recruit paid artists to paint on it, in addition to protesters' statements and art.

Into the evening, several hundred participated in protests around the Statehouse, a smaller number due to rain, though a peaceful and vocal crowd. A candlelight memorial was held in the late afternoon. At about 9 p.m., the crowd's intensity increased, with about 300 marching counter-clockwise around the Statehouse, though everyone was encouraged to disperse at 9:30 to keep with the city's curfew.

==== June 5 ====
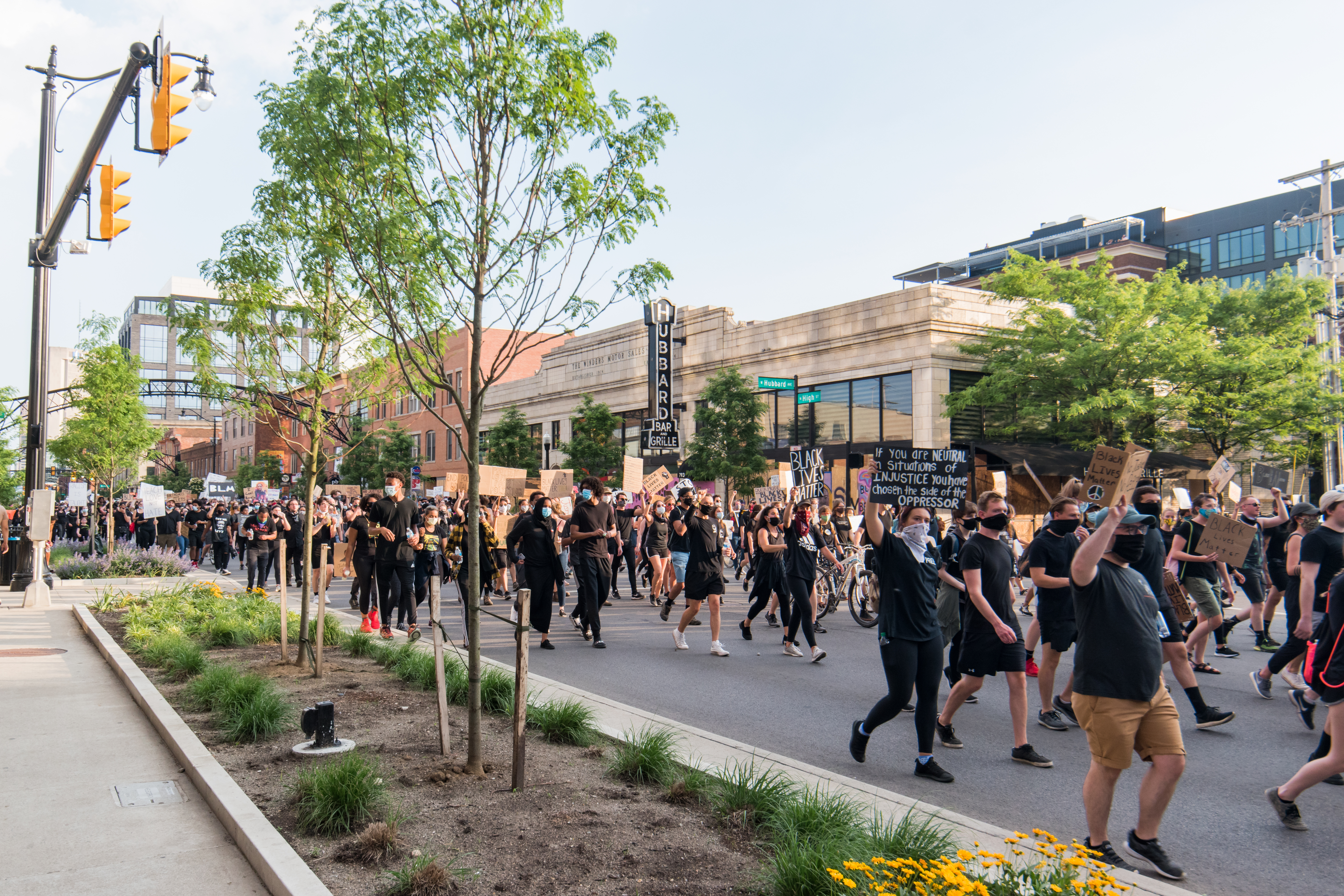
March through the Short North, June 5

Mayor Ginther announced that an independent police civilian review board will be modeled in July, and staffed by January 2021. The city-appointed Community Safety Advisory Commission had recommended the civilian review panel in January 2020. Ginther also announced that the city is reevaluating the use of chemical sprays for crowd dispersal.

Thousands of people attended a peaceful protest at the Ohio Statehouse, most wearing all black. Mayor Ginther mingled among them during the event. In the early afternoon, they marched to the Columbus police headquarters and back. The speeches and chants echoed similar and past protests, though with the addition of singing happy birthday to Breonna Taylor, an African-American woman shot and killed by Louisville police. Downtown streets were closed to traffic around 6:40 p.m. Around 7 p.m., thousands marched up High Street through the Short North, Old North Columbus, and past the Ohio State University campus to Lane Avenue in the University District. After curfew, at around 10:40, police began to show resistance, forming a line and wearing riot gear, though they did not use force to disperse the crowd, then dwindling to about 40 people.

Also on June 5, about 500 medical workers (students, researchers, doctors, and nurses) participated in a demonstration at the Ohio State University's James Cancer Hospital. The event was a part of the nationwide "White Coats for Black Lives" movement, part of the larger Black Lives Matter (BLM) movement. The protesters knelt for the 8 minutes, 46 seconds that George Floyd was pinned down for while he was murdered. "White Coats" events were also held at other Central Ohio hospitals that day, including OhioHealth's Riverside Methodist Hospital, Grant Medical Center, Doctors Hospital, and Dublin Methodist Hospital.

==== June 6 ====
Protests continued with a march from downtown Bexley on Drexel Avenue down Broad Street to the Ohio Statehouse downtown. The group started with a few hundred people, though more joined in, and other groups marched from Goodale Park, Schiller Park, and the University District to converge on the Statehouse. Thousands of people attended the protests at the Statehouse.

Mayor Ginther lifted the week-long curfew, based on peaceful protests, dialogues between protesters and police, no significant violent acts by either side, and no curfew arrests since June 3. A recent federal lawsuit was filed against the city over the curfew, because violence had decreased; the city and plaintiffs reached an agreement and the lawsuit will be dismissed.

About 20 employees of local chain Northstar Cafe walked out on June 6. Service and bar staff walked out of its Short North location in protest of a company policy giving a 50% discount to police and firefighters. An early response to the Floyd protests on June 3 removed the longstanding policy, though it was reinstated on June 5. In addition to the walkout, the location's kitchen manager quit immediately over the policy, though he had given a two-weeks' notice prior.

Evening protests involved several hundred gathering to rest and build relationships by the Franklin Park Conservatory. The group shared food, listened to music, and reflected and decompressed. Activists registered people to vote, spoke to advocate for change, and distributed lists of demands for change in city policing.

==== June 7 ====
Protests continued for an 11th day, with protesters marching at the Ohio Statehouse and City Hall. Protests at the Statehouse were calm, with relatively low attendance at about 300 protesters. The City Hall event was "Gathering of Black Excellence: A Prestigious Protest", a prayer and march attended by black men in suits and ties, signaling that they were serious, and need and deserve to be heard. Mayor Ginther and some Columbus police joined the march. On the same day, City Council members, including its president, called for charges for some protesters to be dismissed. The officials demanded charges for violating curfew and failing to disperse to be dismissed; the city attorney announced some curfew charges had already been dismissed.

==== June 8 ====
About 100 protesters marched west on Broad Street from downtown into Franklinton in support of the movement. In addition, an event was held at the Franklin County Court of Common Pleas in Columbus, involving numerous public defenders kneeling for eight minutes and 46 seconds.

==== June 9 ====
June 9, the 13th day of protests, was the hottest day of the year so far. Crowds were smaller, though several online events were scheduled, along with additional protests into the coming weekend. Also that day, about 300 Ohio State University faculty signed a letter to the school's administration, asking it to cut ties with the Columbus police.

==== June 10 ====
The Ohio National Guard departed the city after nearly two weeks in Columbus. Columbus hosted its first recent hearing on police reform, after five months of inaction. The city council president apologized for inaction on the 330-page report on policing problems released August 2019, and officially delivered to the mayor in January. In the hearing, Mayor Ginther said creating the civilian oversight panel was his top priority, and stated he is calling on state law enforcement officials to assist investigations into Columbus police malfeasance. Some of the city's commissioners pushed for reprioritizing the department's budget, for fewer armored vehicles and helicopters and more social services for police to handle routine societal problems. Focus was also on new crowd control training to allow for civilians' First Amendment rights, and to avoid violent tactics during nonviolent situations. Nonrelated to the protests, severe thunderstorms moved into the area that evening, and a tornado warning was issued for the south side of Columbus.

Another result of the protests included Franklin County Public Health hiring a new associate director of equity and inclusion, focusing on racism and health disparities in Franklin County.

==== June 12 ====
A march was organized from Columbus City Hall to the Ohio Statehouse. The group was made up of mothers of men and women killed by Ohio law enforcement, with the names of the deceased written on their shirts. More than 1,000 protesters joined them.

==== June 14 ====
A protest was held at Northstar Cafe in the Short North, following employee walkouts over the company reinstating a 50% police discount.

==== June 16 ====
Protesters parked cars across High Street in front of the Ohio Statehouse and blocked traffic.

==== June 19 ====
Protests continued. Amid Pride Month, the group Black, Out and Proud held an event in recognition of the interlinked fight for civil rights of black and LGBT communities.

==== June 20 ====
Protests, which were mostly peaceful, continued outside the Statehouse. The groups Columbus Freedom Coalition and Black Queer Intersectional Collective held a protest at Mayor Ginther's house, aimed toward "abolishing, defunding, dismantling, demilitarizing the Columbus Division of Police".

==== June 21 ====
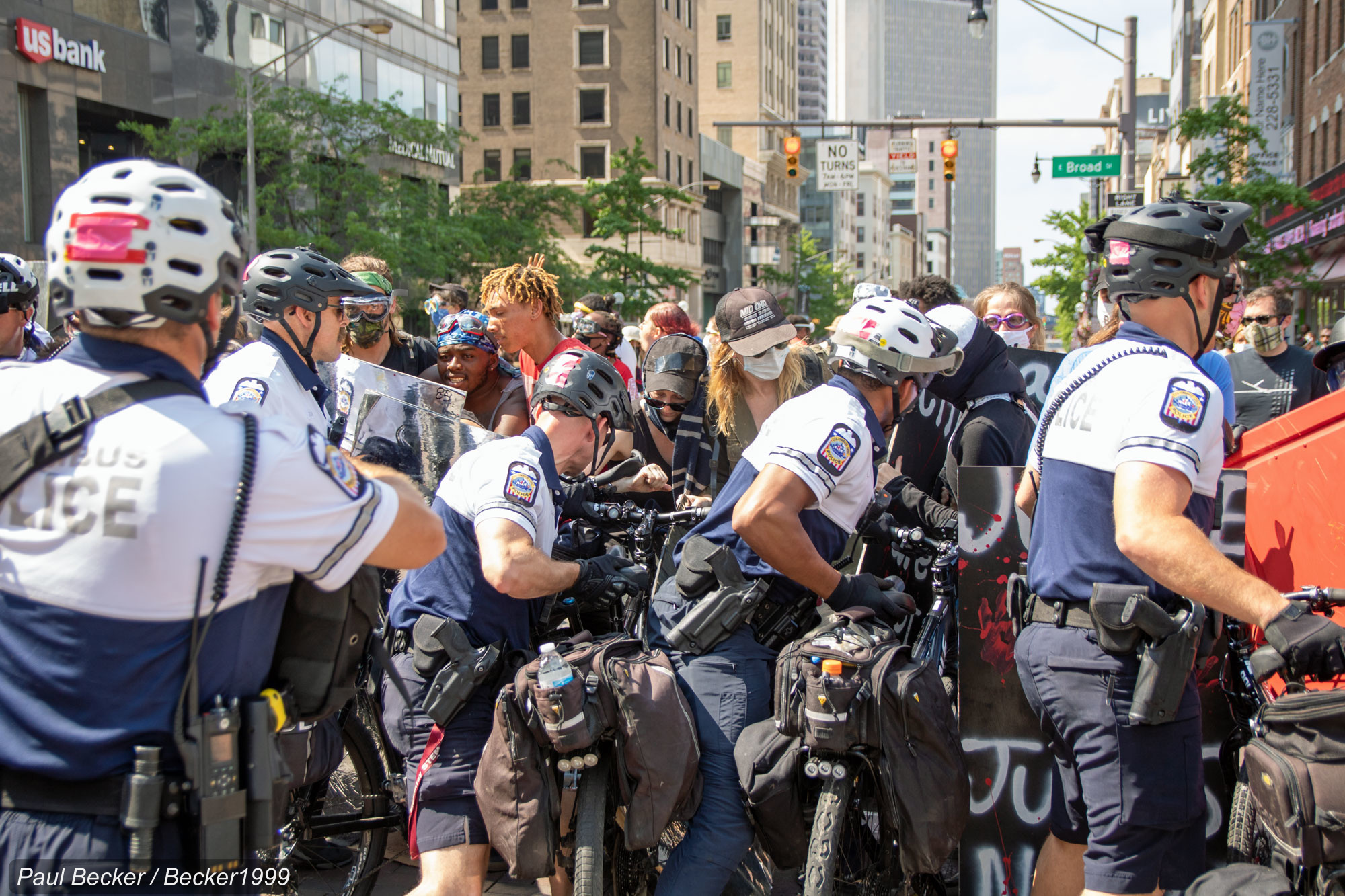
Afternoon conflict at Broad and High, June 21

A peaceful march, titled the LGBTQ Unity March, was held by local black, queer-owned company Kingfinity in the early afternoon, marching from the Ohio Statehouse to Stonewall Columbus. Later in the evening, Statehouse-area protests involving about 250 participants reached a higher conflict than in recent days, beginning with protesters blocking traffic. It led to two arrests, pepper spray being used on protesters, and additional police being called into the area. One of the arrests was over an electric scooter thrown at a police officer.

The June 21 conflict was controversial, as the mayor had banned the use of chemical agents against nonviolent protesters less than a week prior. Mayor Ginther defended the actions, saying that the police were met with violence. Several Columbus City Council members disagreed, and condemned the use of the chemical agents. Another controversy arose over a man with two prosthetic legs, both allegedly removed by police during the conflict. Footage from police body cameras contradict the claim, while other videos show the man throwing a sign at police.

==== June 22 ====
Columbus police officers, speaking anonymously, detailed low morale and unsteady leadership in the department and mixed signals from the city government. Regarding the incident on the prior day, they recounted several "stand-down" orders, conflicting with official accounts by the mayor and Division of Police.

==== June 27 ====
Hundreds gather at a "recall Mayor Ginther" rally, with many calling on Ginther to defund the city's police department.

==== July 18 ====
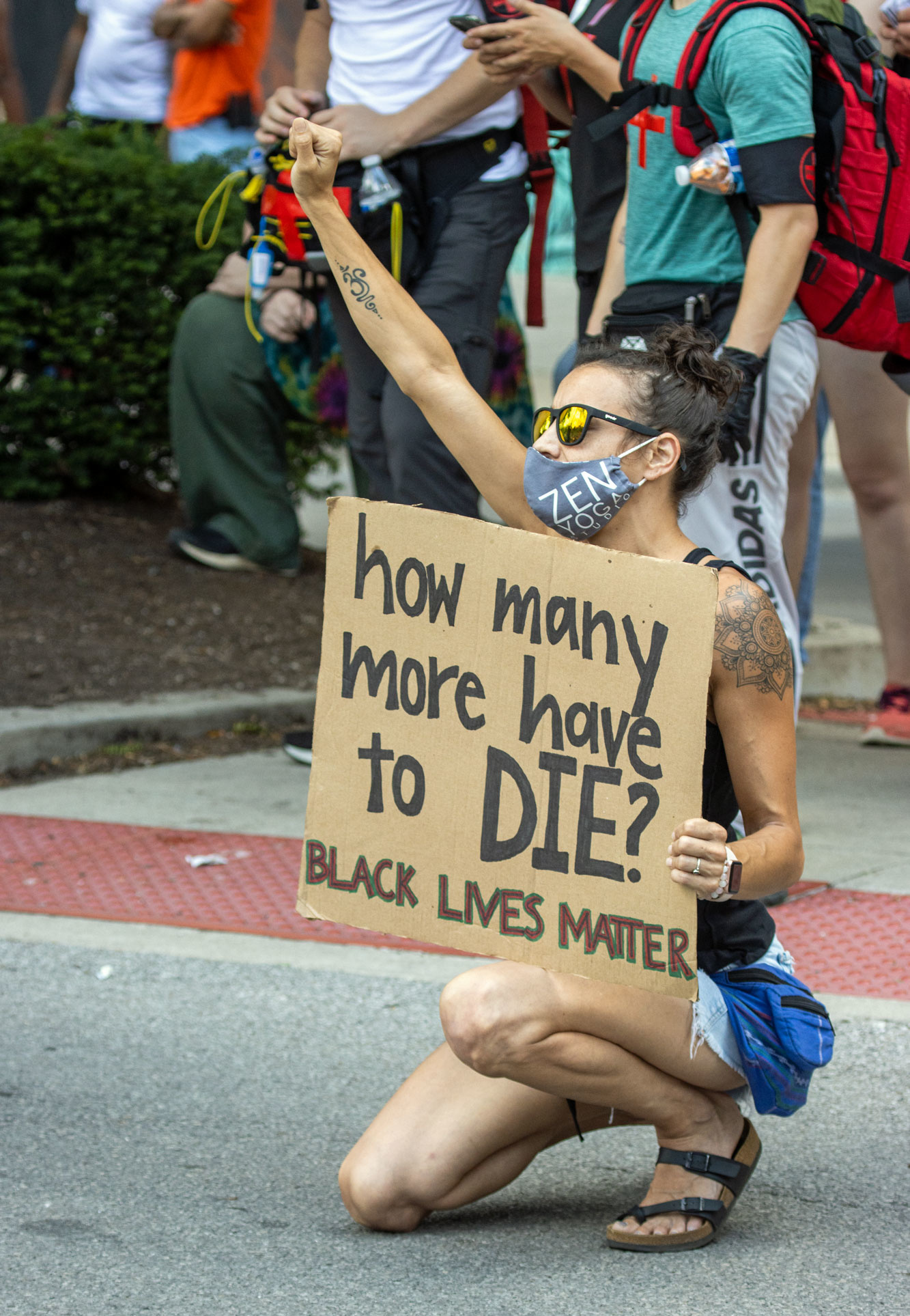
A BLM protester on July 18, 2020

BLM supporters were among several groups protesting outside of the Statehouse. Anti-mask protesters were also present.

==== September 23 ====
About 300 gathered at the Ohio Statehouse to picket and march in protest of the minimal charges brought against officers involved in the shooting of Breonna Taylor.

== Protesters ==
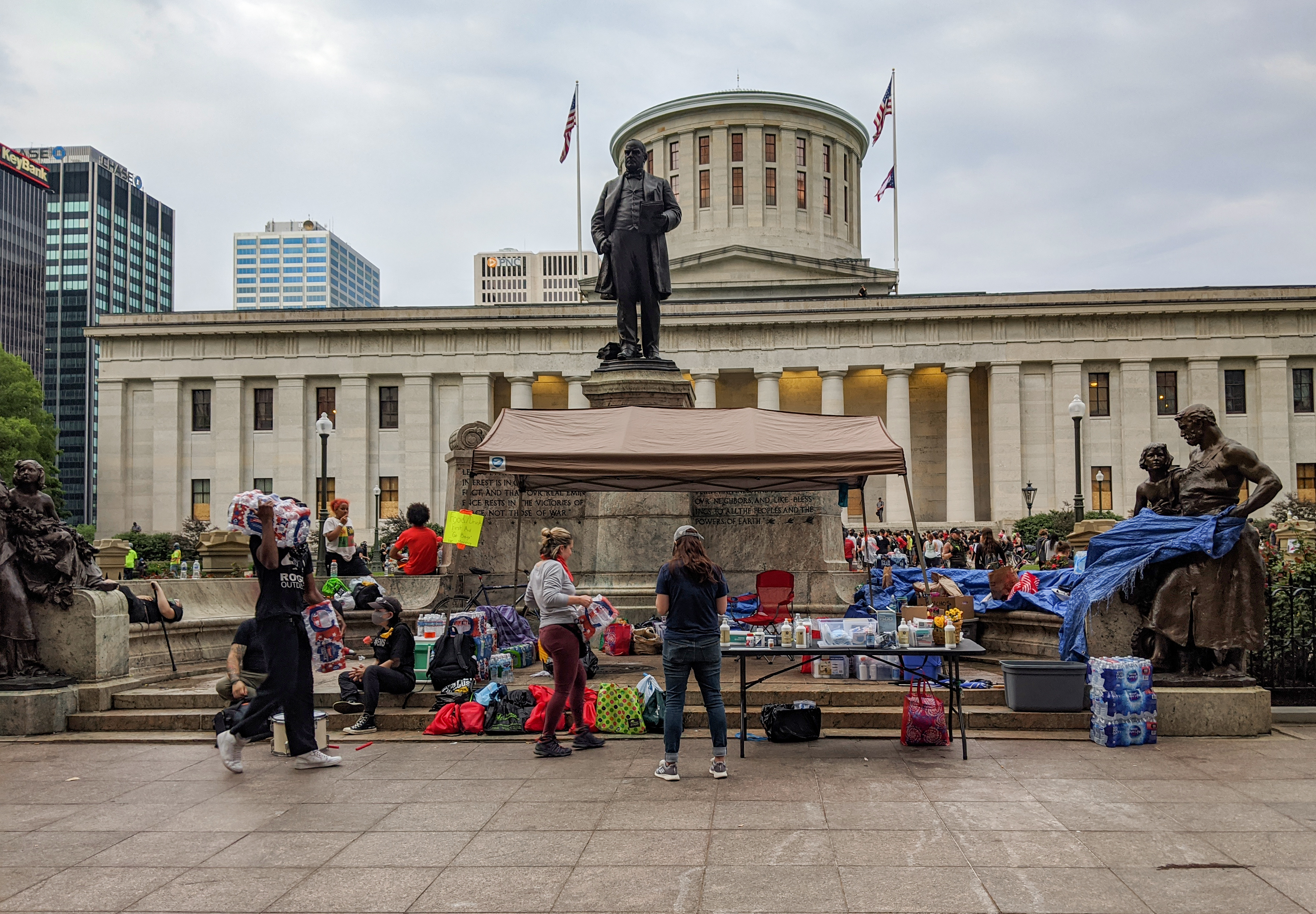
Support stand at the William McKinley Monument by the Statehouse

Messages and aims of the protesters were diverse. Many aim to seek justice for the deaths of people of color recently killed across the country, including several in Columbus. Protesters demanded police reform, including more restraint during peaceful protests, lowering the police budget (defund the police), instituting reforms suggested months prior, and having more transparency and accountability in the department. The police budget was reported at 37 percent of the city's $1 billion budget, which advocates state can be reinvested into communities, improving lives, and crime prevention.

The protesters in downtown Columbus and other central parts of the city were diverse, as people of all races were encouraged to attend. The makeup was reportedly significantly more diverse than 2016 protests' crowds, which were predominantly attended by black residents. By June 13, most of the protesters downtown were predominantly white, and in majority-white suburbs, some white people led events. The multiracial makeup of the crowds is largely supported and encouraged by Columbus protest groups.

The makeup of the protesters, especially those involved in vandalizing and attacking police, has been in question since the protests began. Columbus's police chief, along with Mayor Andrew Ginther, stated there is evidence that some demonstrators protesting and rioting were from outside the community or state, including from the group Anonymous, turning the protests increasingly violent. A June 3 investigation of the 99 people arrested since protests began revealed that all 99 live in Ohio. Only nine of those arrested had addresses outside Franklin or its contiguous counties. The mayor stated that the arrests were inconclusive alone, referring to a bus filled with bats, rocks, meat cleavers, and axes, found by Columbus police on May 31. The bus, registered in Vermont, was parked by Key Bank in Capitol Square before being searched by police.

== Business actions and mural artwork ==
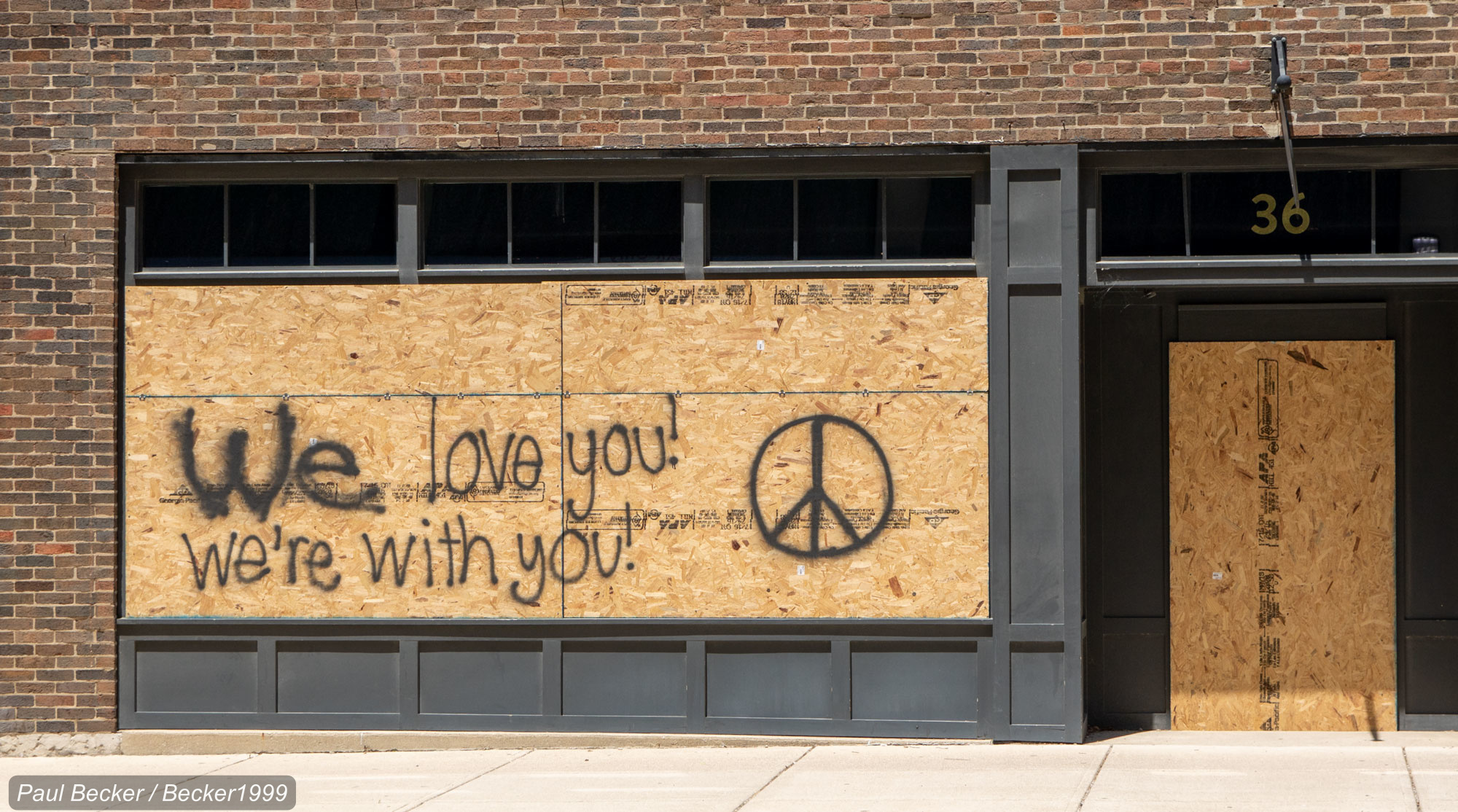
Support signage at a Columbus business

Short North businesses, largely boarded-up due to damage and/or to prevent damage, variously used the plywood boards as posters of support, with messages including "Black Lives Matter" and "I can't breathe". The Huntington Center on Capitol Square has a large plywood wall around it, and has encouraged the Greater Columbus Arts Council to recruit paid artists to paint on it, in addition to protesters' statements and art. The works were planned to be preserved and exhibited by the Greater Columbus Arts Council.

About 1,200 local businesses, nonprofits, and institutions signed a letter to Columbus City Council supporting its declaration of racism as a public health crisis. The Garden, an adult store in the Short North, has been acting as a makeshift first aid and distribution center for protesters.

The Central Ohio African-American Chamber of Commerce is raising money for black-owned businesses damaged during the protests. At least a half dozen of these businesses were damaged between downtown and the Short North.

Several businesses in the city were embroiled in controversy as they supported police actions. Condado, an Ohio-based chain restaurant, fulfilled an order to be sent to police. Among its staff refusing to fulfill it, the workers were threatened with termination, and therefore walked out in protest. At Northstar Cafe, a longstanding 50 percent police discount was rescinded during the protests, though the discount was reinstated soon afterward, prompting employees to walk out.

== Police actions ==
Police had been using tear gas and pepper spray to disperse protesters, hoping they would leave to recover and not return. Protesters and journalists complained that these methods were being used on nonviolent protesters. Other methods used, especially during the initial violent protests, include the use of mounted police, SWAT, and the National Guard using rubber and wooden pellets and flashbangs to drive protesters back.

One action taken by police had been to empty water bottles, preventing them from being thrown at officers, and preventing protesters from washing away tear gas to immediately return to protests. The Central Ohio Street Medic Collective Facebook group spread rumors, repeated on Twitter posts, that some water being passed around is purposefully contaminated with antifreeze to be toxic, though Central Ohio hospitals had no recorded instances of patients taken ill by the substance.

=== Police aggression ===
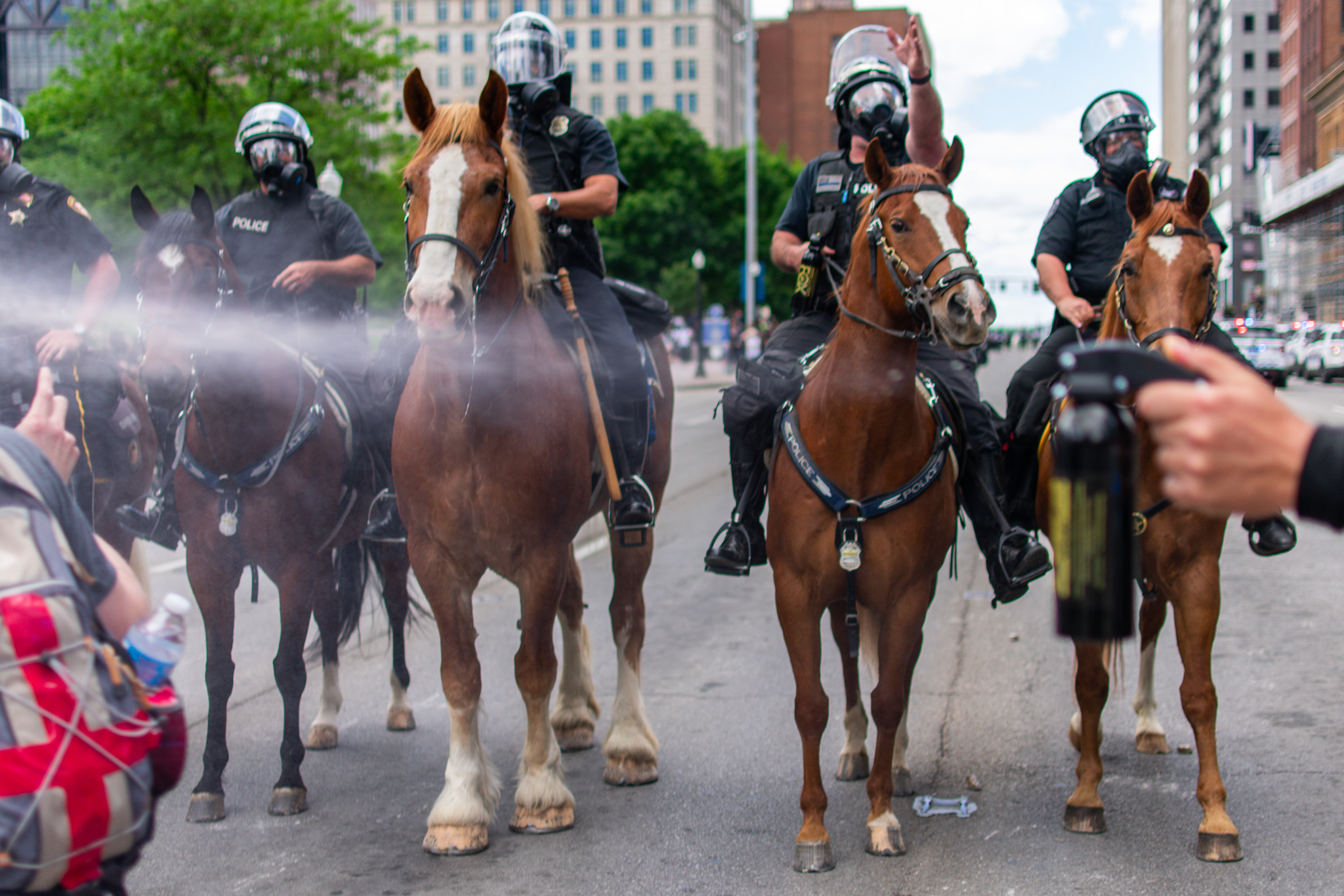
Columbus police pepper-spraying a medic, May 30

On May 30, police aggression was reported, including pepper spraying, tear gas, and shoving people to the ground. On May 31, seven cases of excessive police force during the protests were reported by the local news site Columbus Navigator. They include instances of police using pepper spray on protesters walking away or leaving protests, and removing a protester's mask in order to spray them. On June 1, Mayor Andrew Ginther and Columbus City Council denounced the police chief and his officers for their aggressive tactics.

On June 5, the family of a Columbus protester, a recent Ohio State University graduate, posted on Instagram that she had died on May 30 as the result of an asthma attack brought on by tear gas at a protest downtown two days prior. A coroner's report later determined the death to be due to an unrelated genetic condition.

== Government and institutional effects ==
On May 31, Ohio U.S. Representative Joyce Beatty and Columbus City Council President Shannon Hardin, two of the politicians caught in police pepper spray on the previous day, made a statement supporting a civilian review commission to review police force, instead of allowing the department to investigate its own officers. They support immediate police reform, beyond commissions and studies into the issues.

Mayor Ginther set up an email account for citizens to report misconduct by Columbus police. In its first week, the account received about 700 emails. Of these about 400 were complaints of excessive force, and 230 were in support of police. 27 were from family members of police, concerned about officers' safety. Other complaints were filed with the police department's internal affairs bureau.

On June 1, Mayor Andrew Ginther and Columbus City Council denounced the police chief and his officers for their aggressive tactics. Ginther created an independent review board for police actions: he asks protesters to report instances of excessive force by police during the protests, to be reviewed by a civilian from the Department of Public Safety's Equal Employment Opportunity Compliance Office. On the same day, the city of Columbus declared racism a public health crisis, following Franklin County, which had done the same earlier that month. Over 1,200 people signed a letter of support of the city's declaration, many of whom were local business, institution, and nonprofit leaders.

On June 5, Mayor Ginther announced that an independent police civilian review board will be modeled in July, and staffed by January 2021. The city-appointed Community Safety Advisory Commission had recommended the civilian review panel in January 2020.

On June 7, City Council members including its president called for charges for some protesters to be dismissed. The officials want charges for violating curfew and failing to disperse to be dismissed; the city attorney announced some curfew charges had already been dismissed.

On June 10, Columbus hosted its first recent hearing on police reform, after five months of inaction. The city council president apologized for inaction on the 330-page report on policing problems released August 2019, and officially delivered to the mayor in January. In the hearing, Mayor Ginther said creating the civilian oversight panel was his top priority, and stated he is calling on state law enforcement officials to assist investigations into Columbus police malfeasance. Some of the city's commissioners pushed for reprioritizing the department's budget, for fewer armored vehicles and helicopters and more social services for police to handle routine societal problems. Focus was also on new crowd control training to allow for civilians' First Amendment rights, and to avoid violent tactics during nonviolent situations. Also on June 10, Ohio State announced it will establish a task force to review racial disparities at the school, and the offices of research and diversity/inclusion will establish a $1 million fund to study racism and racial disparities.

Another result of the protests included Franklin County Public Health hiring a new associate director of equity and inclusion, focusing on racism and health disparities in Franklin County.

On June 11, Mayor Ginther announced he will give an executive order to require all fatal use of force cases and cases of death in police custody in the city to be investigated by the Ohio Attorney General's criminal investigation bureau. The Bureau of Criminal Investigation is the state's official crime lab. The independent investigations were aimed to restore confidence in Columbus police, and ensures that these deaths will be investigated by professionally-trained officials. The order will act as a law, but will be supplemented with an addition to the city code.

On June 16, after reevaluating the use of chemical sprays for crowd dispersal, the mayor announced that the sprays will be banned, limited only to "clear instances of violence". A new community panel was formed to give input to the police department on community policing, practices, and strategies. The panel is diverse, including eleven people of color and nine women.

On June 17, the city announced it will join the "8 Can't Wait" movement, which aims to ban chokeholds, exhaust all means before shooting at suspects, require a warning before shooting, requiring de-escalation, banning firing at moving vehicles, requiring a use-of-force continuum, comprehensive reporting on use of force and other incidents, and requiring police officers to intervene when their colleagues engage in wrongdoing. The city already has a use-of-force continuum, bans chokeholds, and bans firing on moving vehicles unless in a case of life-or-death, protecting an officer or bystander. Police were also already supposed to report misconduct they see from other officers.

The City of Columbus announced it will look into revising its symbols, including its city seal and flag, due to their associations with Christopher Columbus. The news comes amid announcements of two of the city's three statues of the explorer being removed.

On June 19, Franklin County (containing most of the city of Columbus) announced it is replacing Columbus Day as a paid holiday for its government employees with Juneteenth, celebrating the abolition of slavery in the U.S. The change will go into effect June 2021.

== Damage and statue removals ==
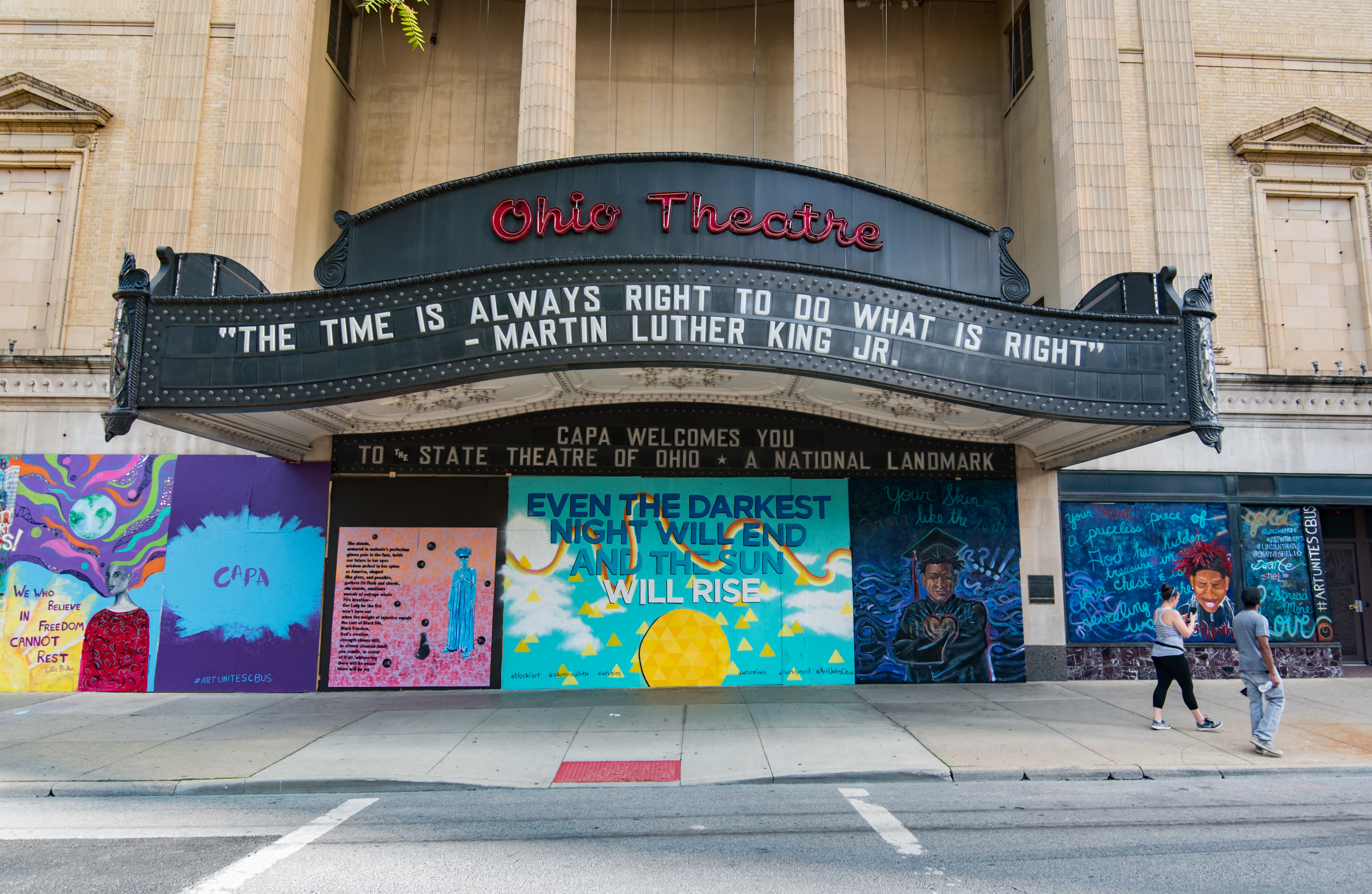
Local art in support of the protests on the boarded-up Ohio Theatre, June 5

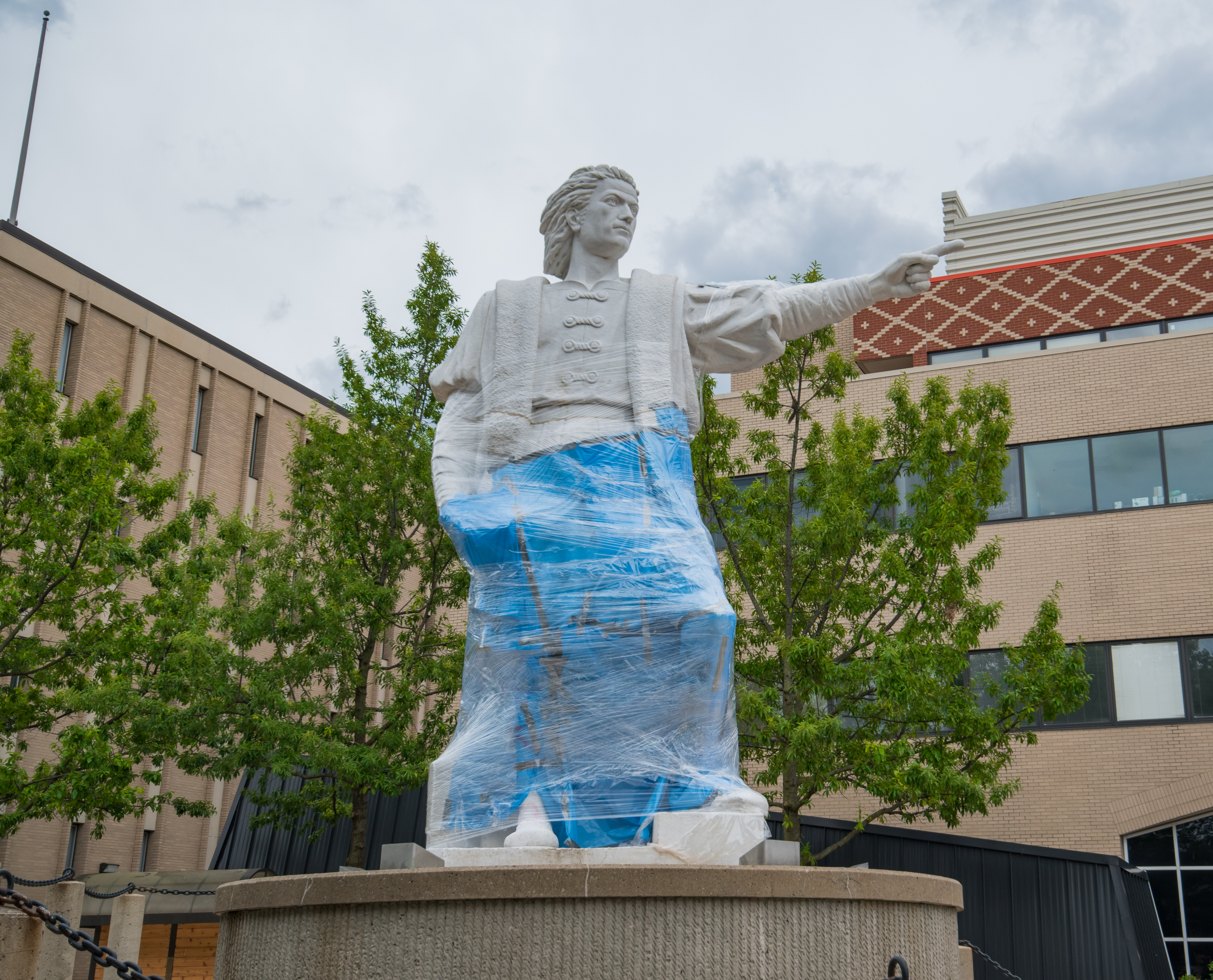
Statue of Christopher Columbus at Columbus State Community College, wrapped to prevent or conceal vandalism. The statue has since been removed.

Numerous properties were damaged during the protests, mostly on the first three nights. Damage has predominately been downtown and in the Short North. Notable buildings damaged include the Columbus Dispatch Building, the Ohio Theatre, the PNC Building, the Borden Building, the Lazarus Building, the Ohio Statehouse, Trinity Episcopal Church, First Congregational Church, the Columbus Athenaeum, and the Ohio Judicial Center. Businesses affected included restaurants, print shops, banks, a funeral home, a computer repair store, and a pet store. The Columbus Dispatch reported that many owners probably had riot damage covered in their insurance policies, covering material damage and loss of furniture or computers, and covering business interrupted during the protests. J. Averi Frost, executive director of the Central Ohio African-American Chamber of Commerce, noted her skepticism, that insurance companies avoid paying, and might not give business-interruption coverage due to the pandemic already shuttering businesses.

Statues graffitied include the William McKinley Monument by the Ohio Statehouse and the Statue of Arnold Schwarzenegger by the Greater Columbus Convention Center. At the time, the city also contained three statues of its namesake, Christopher Columbus, known for "discovering America", afterward colonizing and enslaving its indigenous peoples. The Floyd protests drew renewed attention to the statues. Petitions exist to remove them and to rename the city of Columbus. Columbus State removed its statue of Columbus, which was the first removed; representatives of the other two institutions then stated they had no plans to remove their statues. Statues of the explorer had been damaged or toppled in Saint Paul, Richmond, and Boston during the Floyd protests.

Statues of Christopher Columbus in the city included:

- Statue of Christopher Columbus (1955), Columbus City Hall (removed July 1)
- Statue of Christopher Columbus (1959), Columbus State Community College (removed June 19)
- Statue of Christopher Columbus (1892), Ohio Statehouse (removal was rejected July 16)

On June 19, Franklin County (containing most of the city of Columbus) announced it is replacing Columbus Day as a paid holiday for its government employees with Juneteenth, celebrating the abolition of slavery in the U.S. The change will go into effect June 2021.

== Transportation effects and controversies ==
During the city-issued nighttime curfew, all downtown streets were closed to non-emergency traffic, affecting private automobiles and public transit. As well, several protests and marches involved temporary street closures.

The city's local public transit agency, the Central Ohio Transit Authority (COTA), stopped all service through downtown from May 30 to June 9. Service was rerouted given a Columbus Division of Police emergency established on every downtown street, banning COTA from using the downtown streets for public transit, despite most protests only taking place on High Street and Capitol Square. The service changes affect 14 active bus routes (discounting routes stopped due to COVID-19 ridership decreases). The city's curfew also caused service to end system-wide at 9 p.m. COTA initially reported its service changes were to ensure customers' safety and "give protesters a safe space to demonstrate for the end to systemic racism", though after criticism because the protests were over a much smaller area, the agency instead reported that it was due to the police emergency declared. On June 7, COTA announced it was granted closer access to the center of downtown, allowing stops and transfers on Broad Street and Grant Avenue.

COTA was also criticized after a video of the agency's buses transporting police circulated online. The agency responded by saying that it is part of a longstanding agreement to transport emergency workers, including police, and that the buses were not being used to transport arrested protesters.

At least one electric scooter was thrown at police, on May 28, potentially leading to the scooters being removed from downtown streets beginning on the following day.

== See also ==
- George Floyd protests in Ohio
- List of George Floyd protests in the United States
- List of George Floyd protests outside the United States
