= Statue of Christopher Columbus (New Haven, Connecticut) =

Former public statue in New Haven, Connecticut, United States

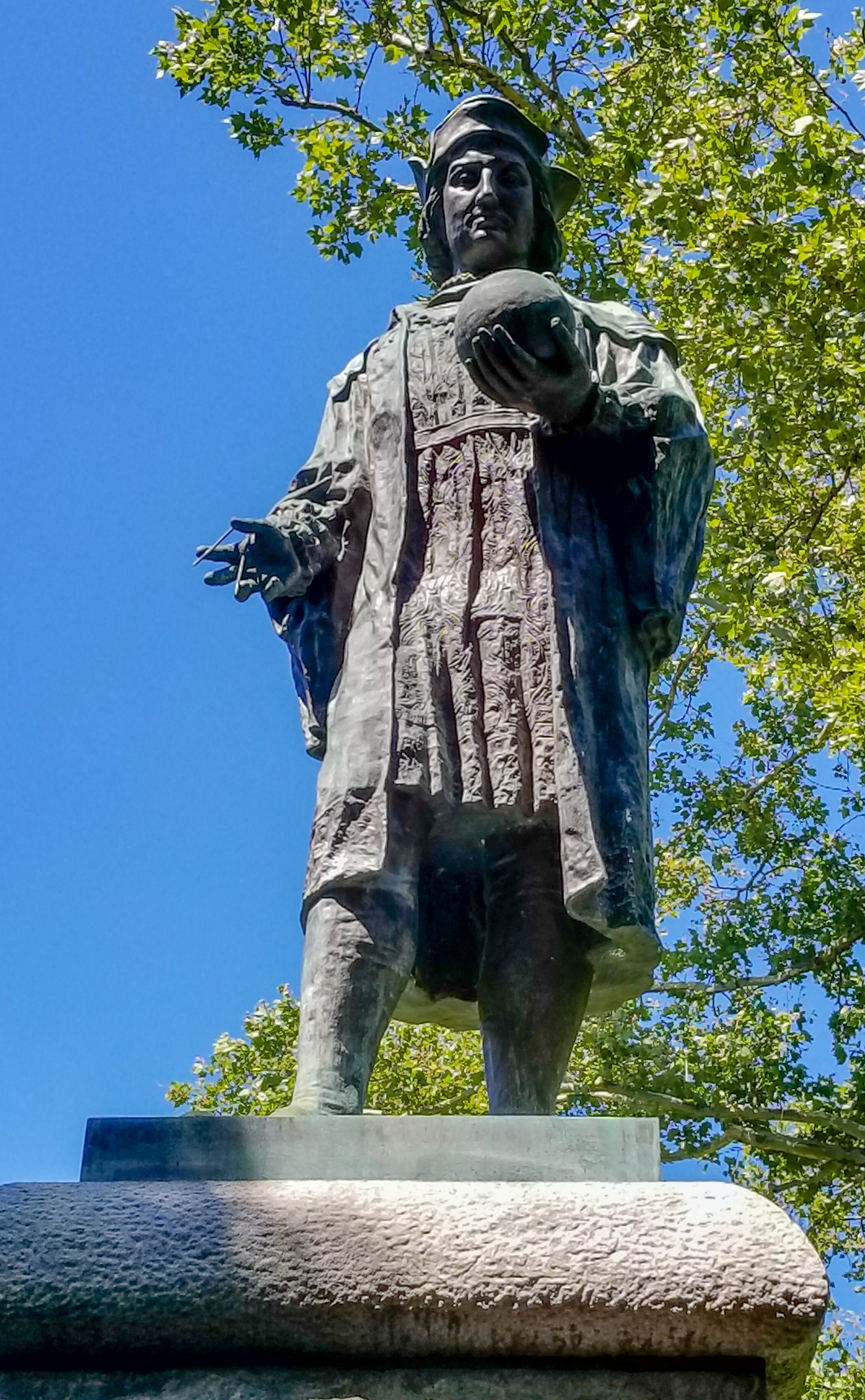
- The statue in 2018
- Subject: Christopher Columbus
- Location: New Haven, Connecticut, U.S.; 41.303992°N 72.918006°W

A statue of Christopher Columbus was installed in New Haven, Connecticut, United States.

== History ==
The statue was fabricated from heavy sheet copper by W. H. Mullins of Salem, Ohio in 1892. The gift of Italian-Americans, the statue was installed in 1892 in Wooster Square. An October 12, 1892 article in the New Haven Register described the time capsule that was placed under the statue: "The corner stone will hold a metallic box containing a number of coins and papers enclosed in a leathery case. There will be a written account of the proceedings of the day, together with a number of American, Italian, and Spanish coins.”

In 1955, the original copper statue, which had deteriorated over time, was recast in bronze.

=== Vandalism and removal ===
In 2017, the statue was vandalized prior to Columbus Day, with red paint splashed on the statue and the words "kill the colonizer" spray-painted along its base.

The statue was removed on June 24, 2020.

== See also ==
- Statue of Christopher Columbus (Ohio Statehouse), produced by the same company at the same time
- List of monuments and memorials to Christopher Columbus
- Italian American Defense League
