= Statue of Christopher Columbus (Columbus City Hall) =

Statue in Columbus, Ohio, U.S.

Christopher Columbus
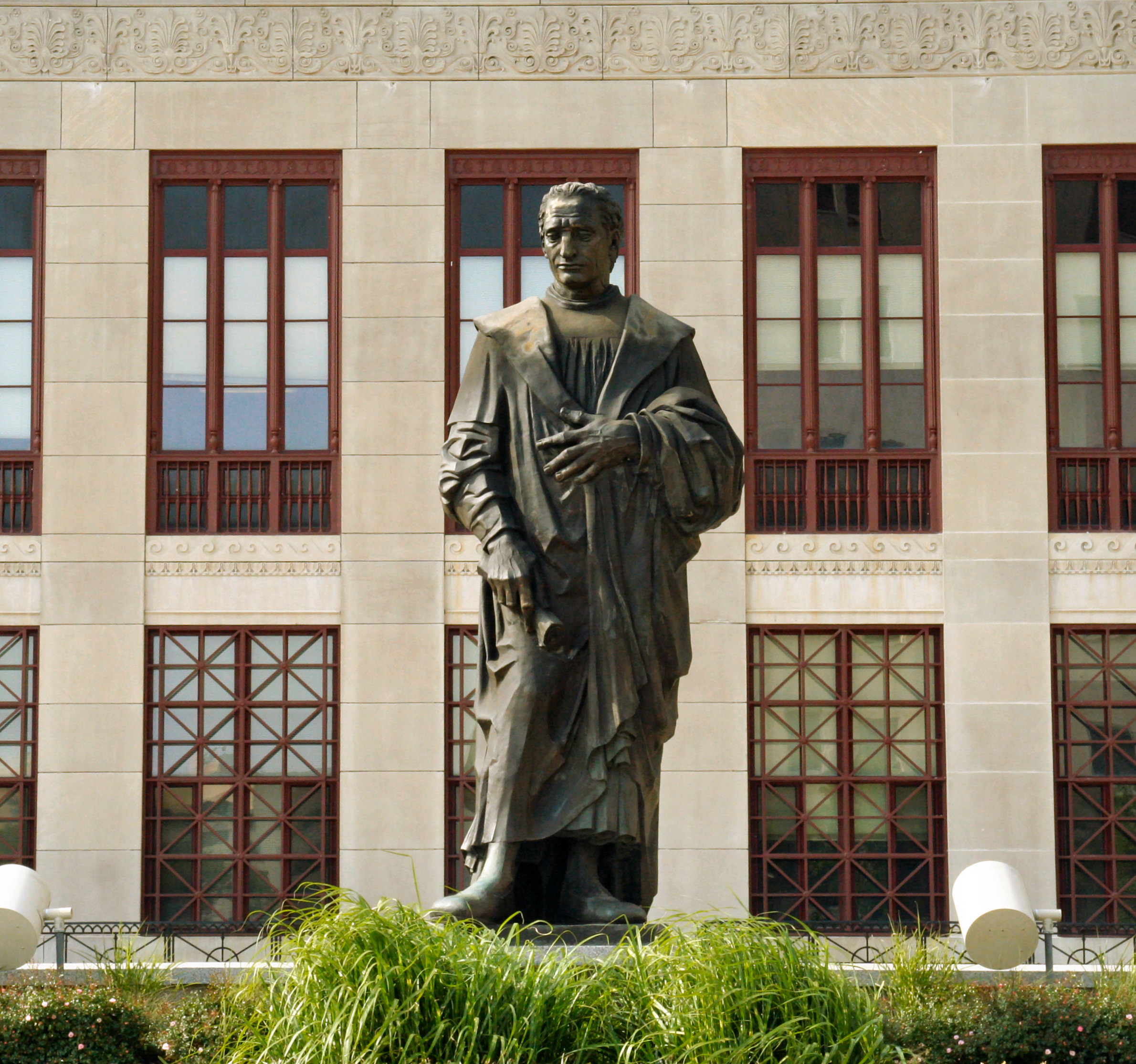
- The statue in 2006
- Interactive map highlighting the statue's former location
- Artist: Edoardo Alfieri
- Year: 1955
- Medium: Bronze sculpture
- Subject: Christopher Columbus
- Location: Columbus, Ohio, United States; 39.962298°N 83.003289°W

Christopher Columbus, or simply Columbus, is a 1955 sculpture by Edoardo Alfieri, originally installed outside Columbus, Ohio's City Hall, in the United States. The statue was unveiled in 1955, celebrating Christopher Columbus's voyages to the New World. It was removed in July 2020.

== Description ==
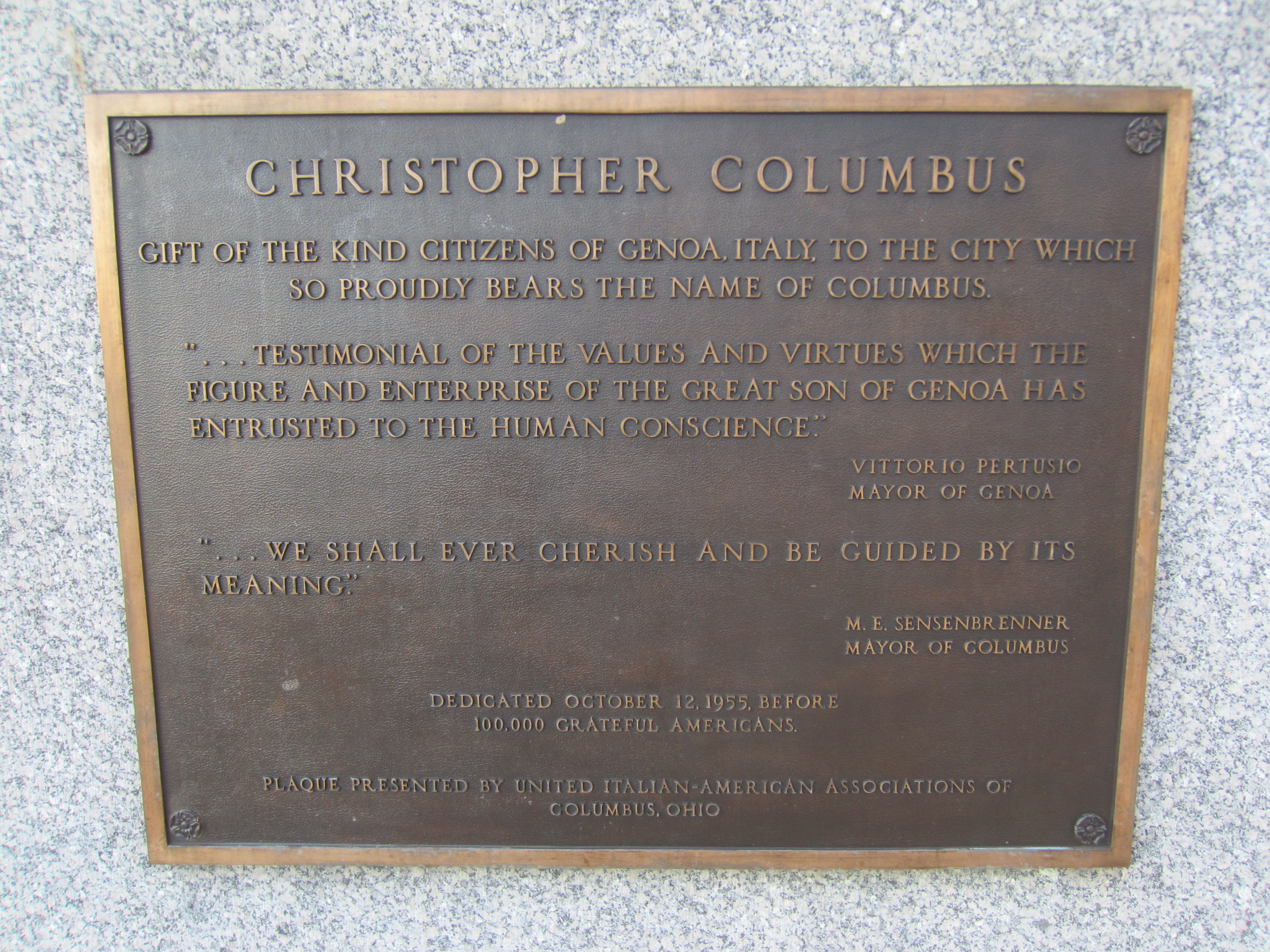
Plaque formerly beneath the statue

The statue rested on and was the central feature of the Portman Plaza on the south side of City Hall adjoining West Broad Street. The bronze alloy sculpture depicts Christopher Columbus wearing a cloak and holding a rolled document. The statue measures approximately 22 × 7.75 × 5.75 ft (6.7 × 2.36 × 1.75 m) and weighs approximately 3 1/2 tons. It rested on a square stone base that measures approximately 6^{3} ft. A bronze plaque is infixed on the base.

== History ==
Cast at the Micheluccio Foundry in Pistoia, Italy, the statue was a gift of the citizens of Genoa, Italy to the citizens of Columbus. It was transported from Italy to the United States aboard the Italian ocean liner SS Cristoforo Colombo. The statue was uncrated and erected in Columbus on October 10, 1955, and dedicated on October 12, 1955, during the city's Columbus Day celebration.

As the statue was undergoing repair work in 1979, a time capsule in the form of a copper box was discovered. It contained, among other items, a railroad bill of lading for shipment of the statue.

The statue was surveyed by the Smithsonian Institution's "Save Outdoor Sculpture!" program in 1992.

== Removal ==
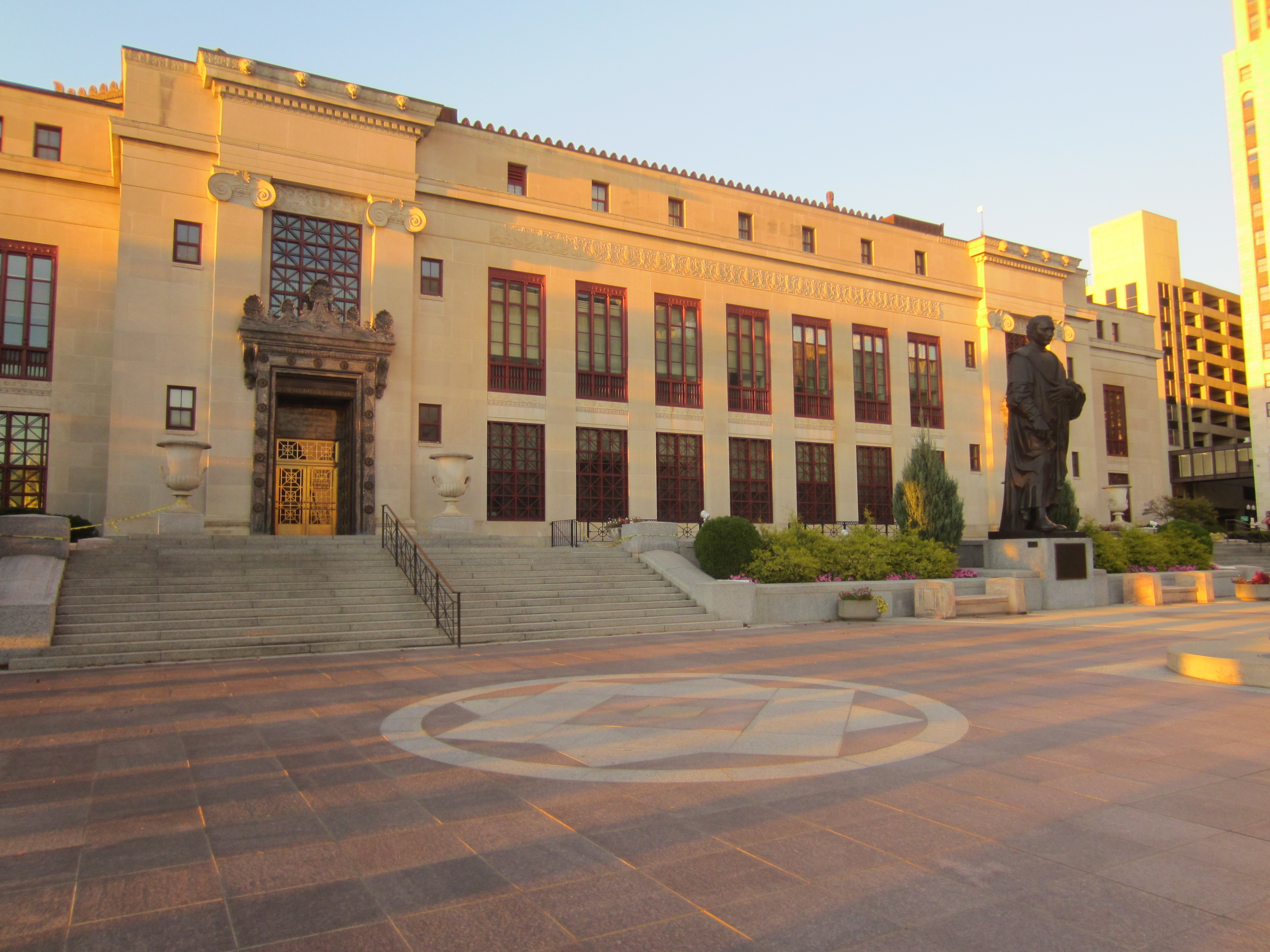
The statue stood on Columbus City Hall's plaza facing Broad Street

Amid the removal of Confederate monuments and memorials beginning in 2015, about 150 protesters rallied at the statue in August 2017. The protests aimed to have the statue removed, given Christopher Columbus's violence and enslavement of Native Americans.

The 2020 George Floyd protests in Columbus renewed calls to remove the statue, with petitions circulating to also remove other statues of the explorer and to rename the city. The statue's removal was announced on June 18, with Columbus mayor Andrew Ginther announcing plans for a work of art that better represents the people of Columbus. The statue had been vandalized one day prior, with the word "rapist" written across the statue's base. The Columbus Piave Club, representing the Italian-Americans who facilitated the statue's installation there, opposed the move, and called for it to either stay or be returned to them. The club stated it had celebrated the anniversary of its unveiling every year by the statue, since 1955. A city resident filed a lawsuit urging for a court order to stop the statue's removal, in hope that a decision is made by the Columbus City Council after a public hearing. The Columbus Art Commission, which oversees the city's public art, voted unanimously to approve the statue's removal on June 24. The statue was removed and stored on July 1, without a public hearing, as Mayor Ginther was able to order it. The art commission announced in 2020 there will be public input into the work that replaces it, and who the artist will be. As of June 26, 2022, the plinth is still empty. The city says the statue will be replaced with a work that reflects diversity.

== See also ==
- 1955 in art
- List of monuments and memorials to Christopher Columbus
- List of monuments and memorials removed during the George Floyd protests
- Statue of Christopher Columbus (Columbus State Community College)
- Statue of Christopher Columbus (Ohio Statehouse)
