= Statue of Christopher Columbus (Columbus State Community College) =

Statue by Alfred Solani, formerly at Columbus State Community College, Ohio, U.S.

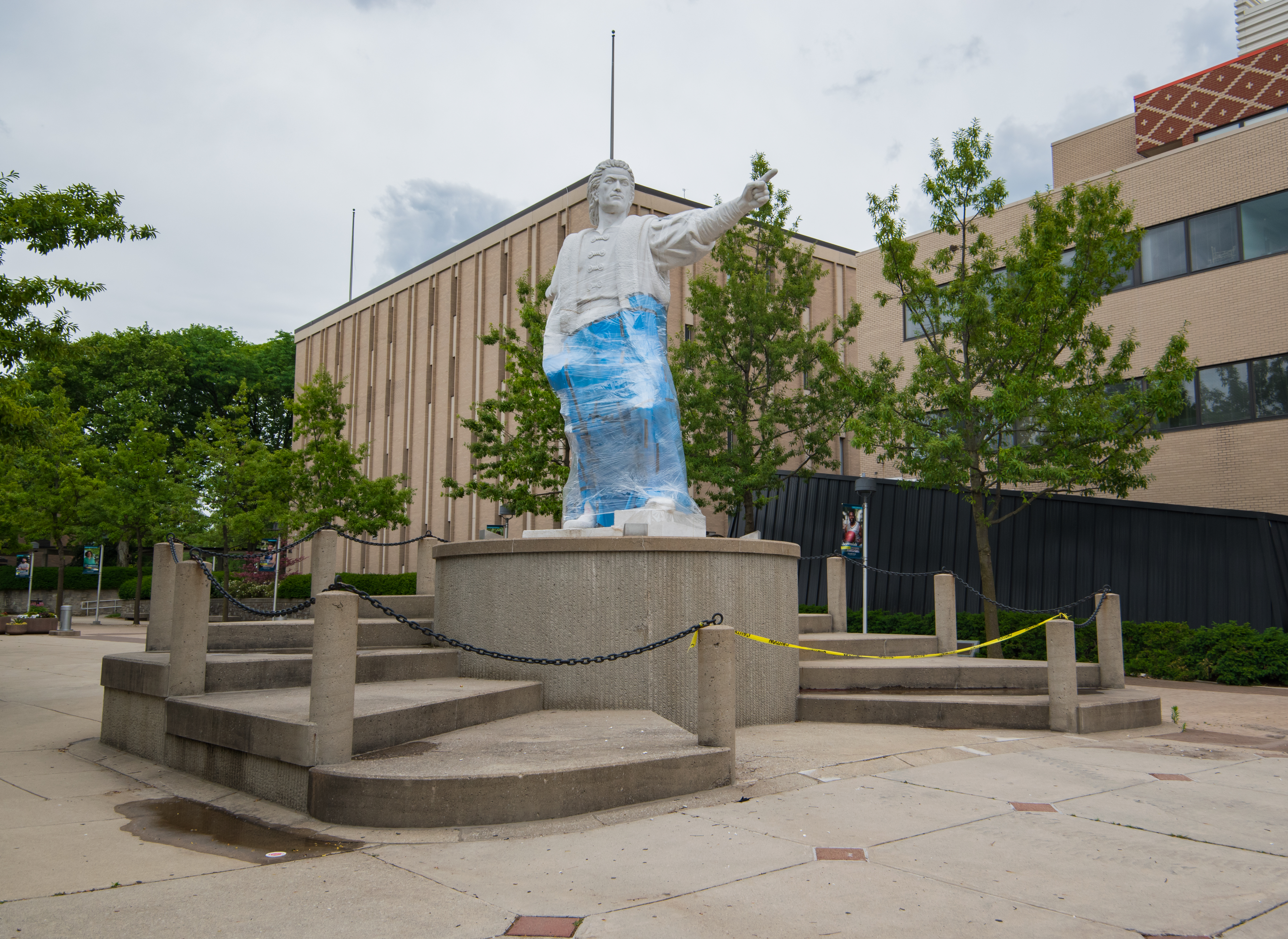
- The statue, wrapped to conceal or prevent vandalism, June 2020
- Location while at Columbus State Community College
- Artist: Alfred Solani
- Year: 1959
- Medium: Marble sculpture
- Subject: Christopher Columbus
- Dimensions: 5.2 m (17 ft)
- Location: Columbus, Ohio, U.S.; 39.969609°N 82.988038°W

A 1959 statue of Christopher Columbus by Alfred Solani was installed on the Columbus State Community College's downtown campus in Columbus, Ohio, United States. The monument is one of three in Columbus commemorating the explorer. The statue was removed June 19, 2020.

== Description ==
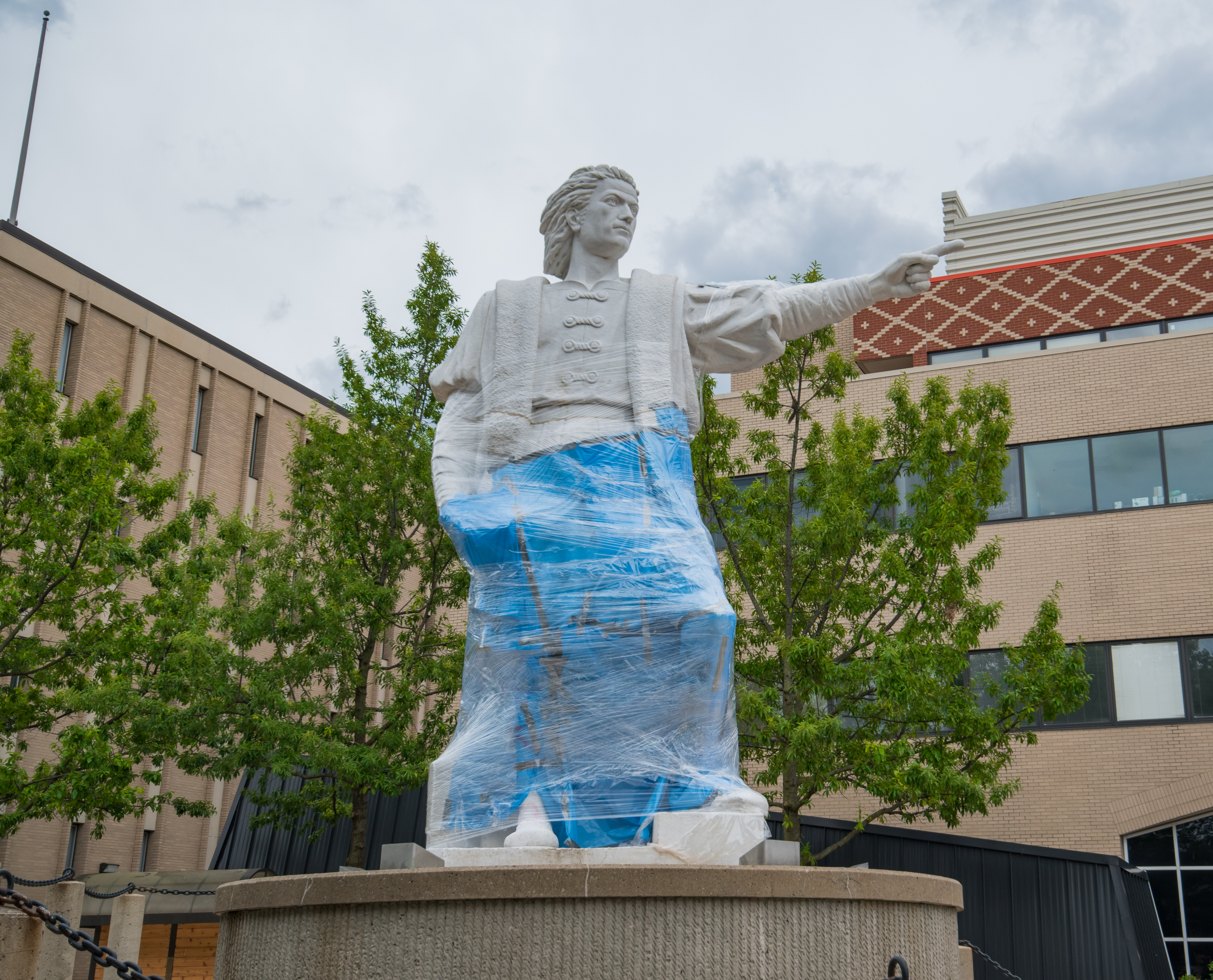
Closeup of the marble statue

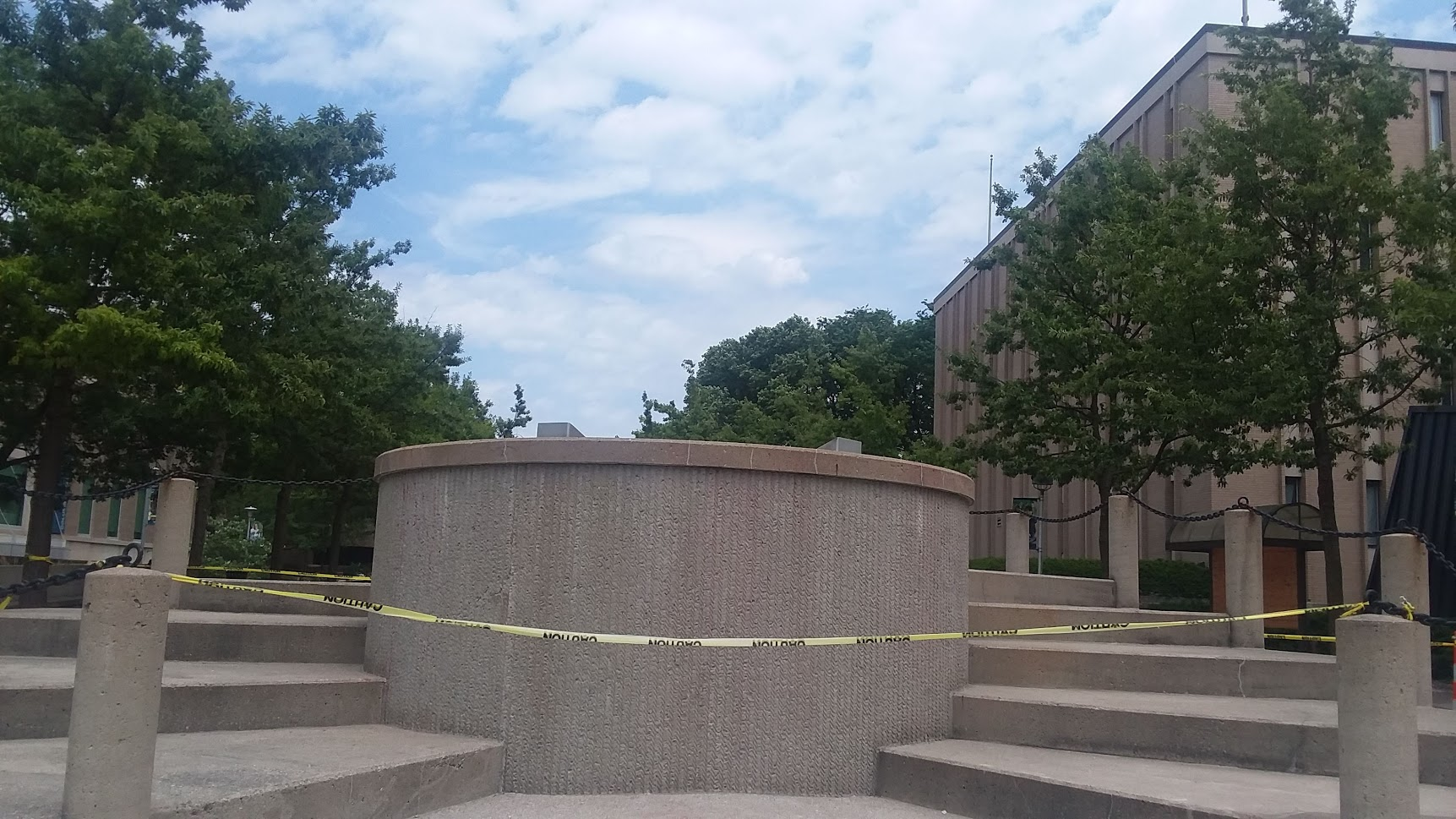
Empty pedestal after the statue's removal

The marble statue is 17 ft (5.2 m) tall. It originally was created with a flat head, rounded out by Columbus-based sculptor Alfred Tibor in his 1987 restoration.

== History ==
The statue was created in 1959, commissioned by Anthony De Tomasi. It was offered to the city of San Francisco, which declined the gift. In 1966, De Tomasi installed the sculpture in a park he was developing in Barrington, Illinois, a suburb of Chicago. After several decades there, it fell into disrepair, including one of its eyes shot out.

The statue was moved to Columbus in 1986, in three pieces in a Columbus Parks and Recreation office. It was restored by Tibor in 1987 and donated to the college one year later, installed in May 1988. The 2020 George Floyd protests in Columbus created calls to remove the statue, with petitions circulating to also remove other statues of the explorer and to rename the city. The college stated it was looking into removing the statue, and it may be the first to be removed out of the three in the city. On June 16, the school administration announced it will remove and store the statue, and will aim to place a different work of art on the statue's pedestal. The family of the sculptor stated that they are against its removal. Columbus City Council President Pro Tem Elizabeth Brown supported the statue's removal, stating that City Hall's must be next. The statue was vandalized in mid-June, 2020. Hours after the statue's removal was announced, it was vandalized again, with spray-painted "America's first Atlantic slaver".

== See also ==
- 1959 in art
- List of monuments and memorials to Christopher Columbus
- List of monuments and memorials removed during the George Floyd protests
- List of public art in Columbus, Ohio
- Statue of Christopher Columbus (Columbus City Hall)
- Statue of Christopher Columbus (Ohio Statehouse)
