= Edoardo Alfieri =

Italian sculptor (1913–1998)

Edoardo Alfieri (1913 in Foggia, Italy – 1998 in Sanremo, Italy) was an Italian sculptor.

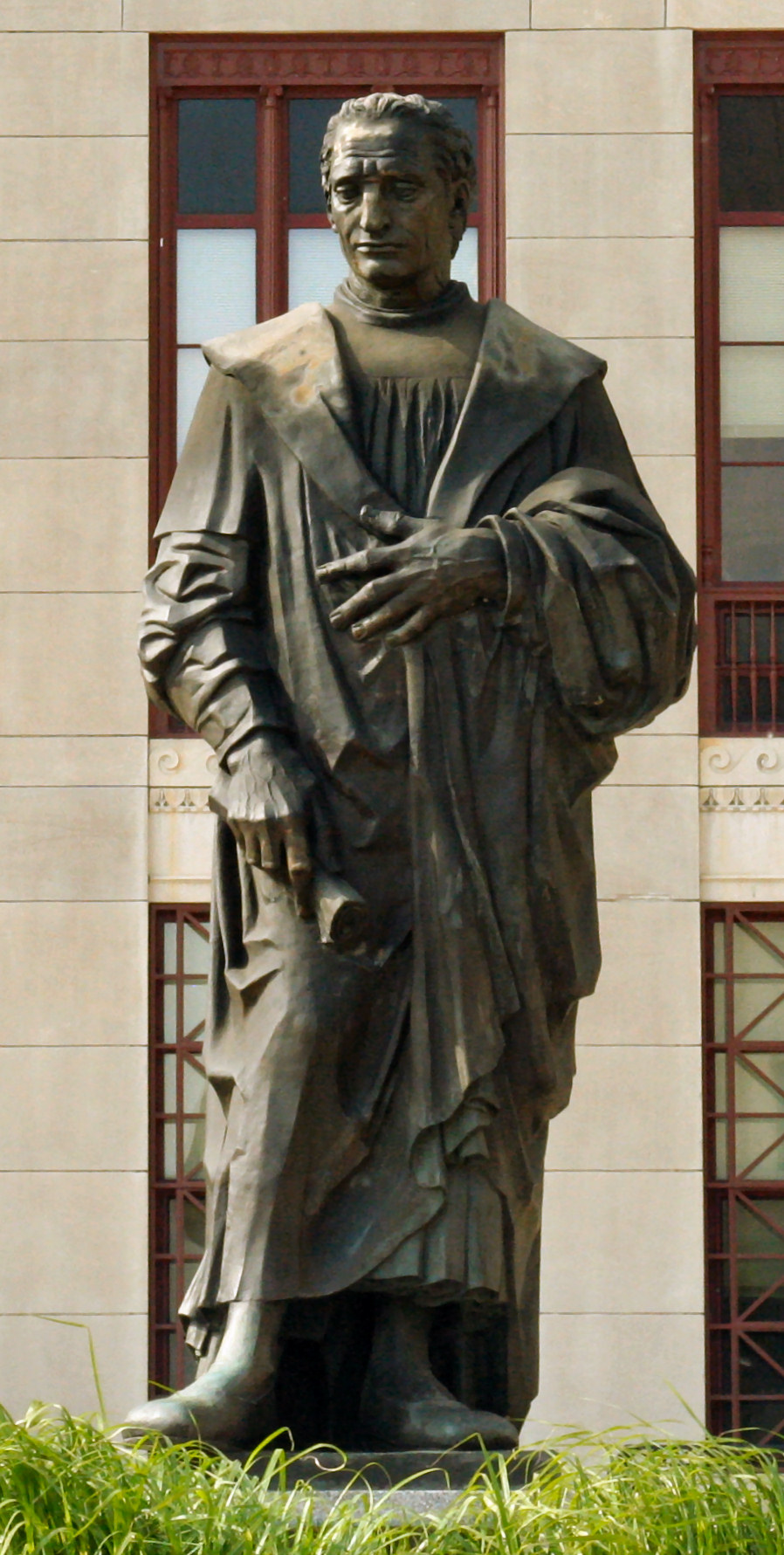
Christopher Columbus by Edoardo Alfieri, installed next to the City Hall of Columbus, Ohio in 1955

Although he was born in Foggia, southern Italy, his family was of Piemontese origin and soon moved to Genoa, where he spent his childhood. He studied art at the school of Guido Galletti at Genoa and then, from 1932 to 1936, continued his studies at the Brera Academy of Fine Arts in Milan, under Francesco Messina.

Already at the age of sixteen he won a first prize for his artwork at an exhibition in Genoa. In the 1930s, he was a member of the futurist group Synthesis. After World War II, he held a post as a lecturer at the Academy of Fine Arts of Genoa until 1969.

Alfieri presented his work several times at the Biennale of Venice: in 1940, 1948, 1950, and in 1956 even in a dedicated hall. His work has been characterized as oscillating between avant-garde and traditional. Besides expressionist works, such as the Dagna grave at the cemetery of Staglieno, he also did traditional sculptures like the statue of Christopher Columbus that was given as gift to the city of Columbus, Ohio in the United States in 1955. Some of his works are abstract, for instance the Mele grave at Staglieno, or the bas-relief "Furor Mathematicus".
