= Italian American Defense League =

- Abbreviation: IADL
- Formation: 2021
- Type: Nonprofit
- Purpose: Advocacy, cultural preservation, legal defense
- Headquarters: New Haven, Connecticut, United States
- Website: iadlnow.org

The Italian American Defense League (IADL) is a nonprofit advocacy organization headquartered in Connecticut. Founded in 2021 by president Matthew Guarnieri, the organization is dedicated to preserving and promoting Italian American cultural heritage. The IADL has been particularly active in legal efforts to restore the Christopher Columbus statue in New Haven's Wooster Square.

== History ==
The IADL was established in response to the removal of the Christopher Columbus statue from Wooster Square Park in New Haven in June 2020. The statue, erected in 1892 by the local Italian American community, was taken down amid nationwide protests and reevaluations of historical figures. The removal, conducted without public notice or formal procedures, galvanized members of the Italian American community to form the IADL in early 2021 to advocate for their cultural heritage and rights.

== Mission and platforms ==
The IADL states that it "supports education, portrays Italian Americans positively, and preserves cultural traditions".

The organization emphasizes that it opposes racism and supports civil rights, but not at the expense of Italian Americans. It supports Indigenous Peoples' Day, but opposes the replacement of Columbus Day with Indigenous Peoples’ Day.

== Legal action ==
=== Columbus statue law suit ===
In June 2023, the IADL, alongside New Haven resident Ralph Marcarelli, filed a lawsuit against the City of New Haven and Mayor Justin Elicker over the removal of the Columbus statue. The plaintiffs argued that the removal violated due process, lacked public transparency, and disregarded the cultural significance of the monument to the Italian American community.

The lawsuit contended that the city's actions were conducted without proper public notice, meeting records, or formal votes, thereby infringing upon federal historic preservation laws and the rights of local residents.

After an initial dismissal by the district court, the IADL filed an appeal to the United States Court of Appeals for the Second Circuit in January 2025. The appeal emphasized the broader implications for cultural preservation and the rights of ethnic communities to maintain their historical symbols.

== Affiliations and activities ==
In 2023, the IADL was inducted into the Conference of Presidents of Major Italian American Organizations (COPOMIAO), a national coalition of Italian American cultural groups.

Beyond legal advocacy, the IADL engages in educational outreach, cultural events, and community programs aimed at celebrating Italian American heritage and fostering understanding among diverse communities.

== See also ==
- Order Sons of Italy in America
- National Italian American Foundation
- Italian American
- Ethnic interest groups in the United States
