= Statue of Christopher Columbus (Ohio Statehouse) =

Statue in Columbus, Ohio, U.S.

Christopher Columbus
- Christopher Columbus Discovery Monument
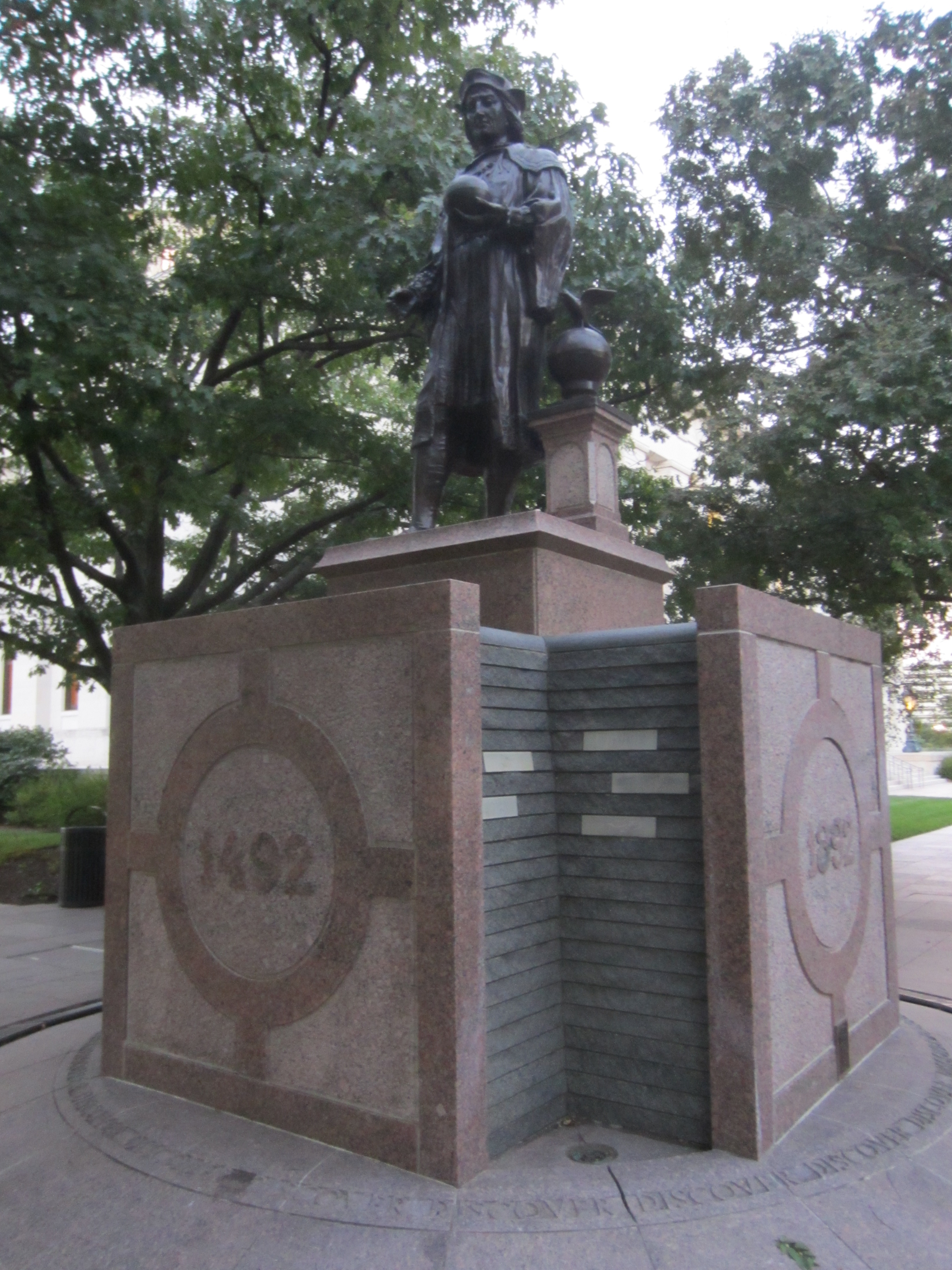
- The memorial in 2018
- Artist: Alfonso Pelzer
- Medium: Copper sculpture; granite (base)
- Subject: Christopher Columbus
- Location: Columbus, Ohio, United States; 39°57′38.6″N 82°59′58.2″W

Christopher Columbus, also known as the Christopher Columbus Discovery Monument, is a c. 1890–1892 copper sculpture depicting Christopher Columbus by Alfonso Pelzer, installed on the Ohio Statehouse grounds, in Columbus, Ohio, United States.

== Description ==
The sheet copper statue was cast by W. H. Mullins Company and depicts Columbus holding a globe. Next to Columbus is a granite pedestal with a dove on top of a globe. The statue is approximately 9 feet (2.7 m) tall and weighs 150 lbs.

=== Inscriptions ===
There are several inscriptions on the base. One on the south side reads, "The Pontifical College Josephinum commissioned this statue from the W. H. Mullins studio". Another on the east side reads, "Donated by the Josephinum to the State of Ohio / The statue was relocated to Capitol Square." An inscription on the north side reads, "The fountain honors Ohio's sister state bond with Liguria, Italy, the navigator's home." The west side has: "Christopher Columbus, an Italian navigator, launched four voyages of discovery to the new world."

Similarly, the fountain has multiple inscriptions. One on the south side reads, "1892 A dream shared / by later generations / who explored a vast continent / where freedom and opportunity / beckoned to those with / the courage and imagination to venture westward". Another on the east side reads, "1932 Westward into Ohio / came the successors / to the spirit of Columbus, / naming the capital city / of the new state / after the man who symbolized / the spirit of the frontier". The inscription on the north side reads, "1992 Frontiers explored / by later generations of Ohioans / extend beyond land and water / to a new world / whose potential / remains to be unlocked / by the spirit of discovery". The west side has: "1492 The spirit of discovery has the power to change / the course of human history, / as demonstrated by / the voyages of / Christopher Columbus / whose imagination shattered the boundaries / of the western world. / Modern history has been shaped by / one man's courage to pursue a dream."

== History ==
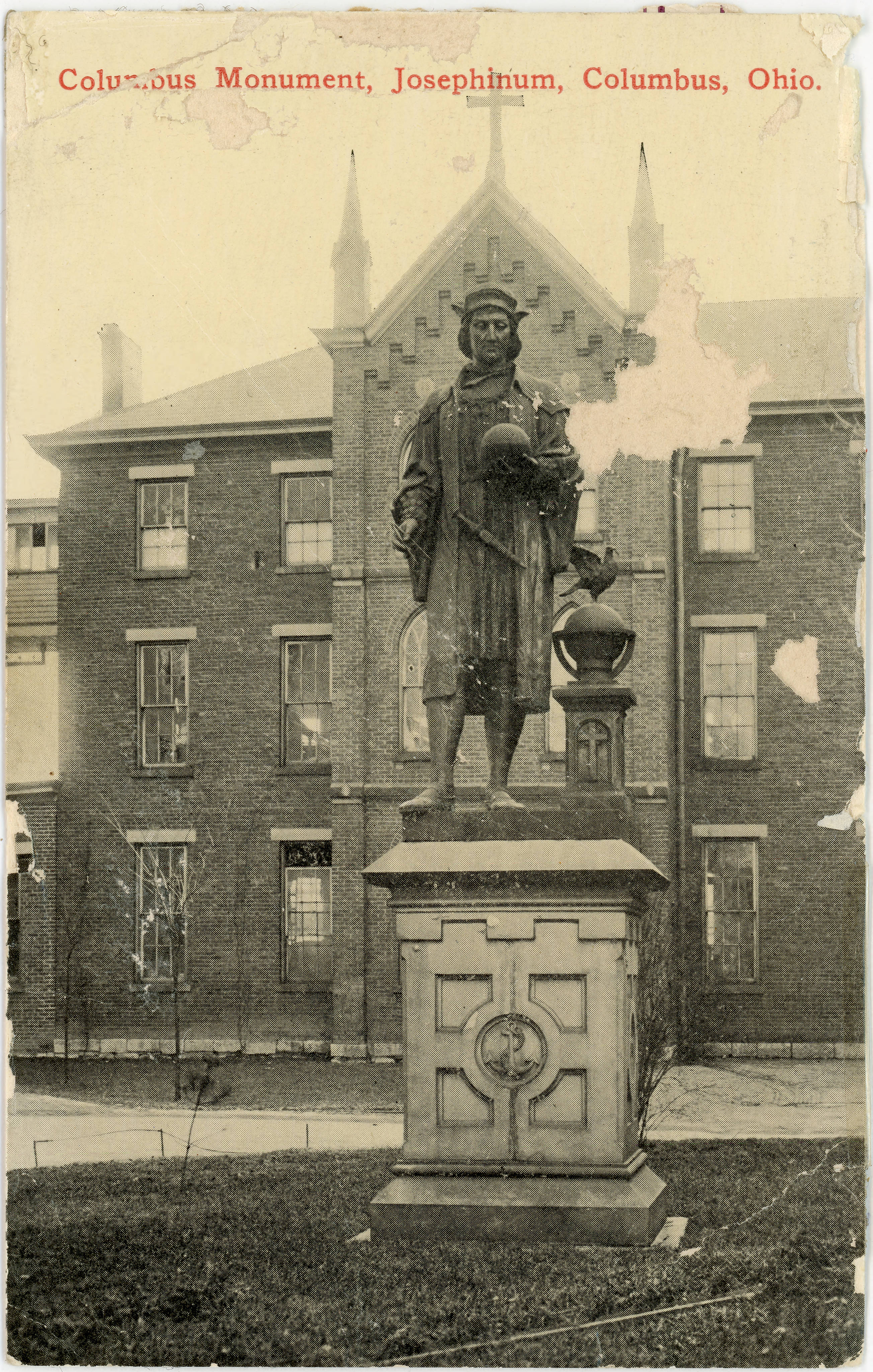
The statue while at the Pontifical College Josephinum in Columbus

At the Ohio Statehouse, 1974

The memorial was commissioned by Joseph Jessing of the Pontifical College Josephinum to commemorate the 400th anniversary of Columbus's voyage, and was purchased by Jessing in 1892 for $400–500. From 1892 to 1932, the work was installed at the college's original campus in Columbus, along 18th Street between Main and Mound. It was gifted to Ohio in 1932.

The monument has been vandalized multiple times. The dove, which had been removed and found, was rededicated on October 12, 1953. The memorial was relocated while the Statehouse underwent restoration in 1991. During 1991–1992, a new granite base and fountain was designed by E. G. & G., Inc., and unveiled for the 500th anniversary of Columbus's voyage. The artwork was surveyed by the Smithsonian Institution's "Save Outdoor Sculpture!" program in 1993.

Amid news of the city's other two statues of Christopher Columbus being removed, the legislators in the Capitol Square Review & Advisory Board discussed the Statehouse statue during their July 16 meeting. The review board, which maintains the Statehouse grounds and its statues, is mostly made up of Republicans. Its chair and vice chair, Republicans Larry Householder (then-Speaker of the Ohio House) and Larry Obhof (also Ohio Senate President), opposed the statue's removal. Janine Boyd and Hearcel Craig, both African-American and Democratic members of the board and Ohio legislature, stated their support of its removal.

== See also ==
- List of monuments and memorials to Christopher Columbus
- Statue of Christopher Columbus (Columbus City Hall)
- Statue of Christopher Columbus (Columbus State Community College)
- Statue of Christopher Columbus (New Haven, Connecticut), produced by the same company at the same time
