= Milo-Grogan =

Neighborhood in Columbus, Ohio

- Neighborhood of Columbus
- Interactive map of Milo-Grogan
- Coordinates: 39°59′11″N 82°59′21″W
- Country: United States
- State: Ohio
- County: Franklin
- City: Columbus
- ZIP Code: 43201

Milo-Grogan is a neighborhood of Columbus, Ohio. The neighborhood was settled as the separate communities of Milo and Grogan in the late 1870s. Large-scale industrial development fueled the neighborhood's growth until the 1980s, when the last factories closed. The community has received urban renewal efforts in recent years fueled by the Columbus Department of Development and Milo-Grogan Area Commission.

== History ==
=== Prior to 1900 ===
Separate communities of Milo and Grogan were established by Jonathon Fallis Linton, one of Columbus's largest land brokers, just before the turn of the twentieth century. "Milo" originates from a man named Milo Streets who owned a brickyard at the corner of St. Clair and Third Avenue. "Grogan" derives from John Patrick Grogan who opened a grocery store and post office on Cleveland Avenue. Milo stretched from First Avenue along Cleveland Avenue and west to the railroad tracks. Grogan was east of Milo and extended to eleventh Avenue on both sides of Cleveland Avenue. The boundaries of Milo and Grogan were never clear, so identifying the area as "Milo-Grogan" became popular. The unification of Milo-Grogan was further promoted by Cleveland Avenue which was shared by the communities and used as a business strip.

Milo-Grogan developed in response to factories that settled in the late nineteenth century. Kilbourne and Jacobs Manufacturing Co., a wheelbarrow company, was the first to move into the area. The factory opened a plant half a mile northeast from Union Station on the west side of the railroad tracks. In 1880, the Berry Brothers Bolt Works established a factory just north of Kilbourne and Jacobs and later built a second, smaller factory next to the original. The Jeffrey Manufacturing Company also moved into the area around the same time and built a massive industrial factory along the northbound rail line. Jeffrey Manufacturing eventually took over most of the area from First Avenue to Lincoln towards Second Avenue and Fourth Street. Timken Company, Columbus Dye, and the Columbus Transit Company were other companies that were located in the Milo-Grogan area.

=== After 1900 ===
The Jeffrey Manufacturing Company flourished in Milo-Grogan and provided many services for its employees. J.A. Jeffrey, owner of Jeffrey Manufacturing, established one of the earliest industrial infirmaries in 1889 and a cooperative store in 1904 in the factory block. In 1912, Jeffrey also set up an employee cafeteria and a Building and Loan Association that helped financially assist its employees in building their homes. The employee population was quickly growing in Milo- Grogan and Columbus could not keep up with its police force, water, electricity, and fire services, causing an annexation from the city.

The Jeffrey Manufacturing Company steadily grew until 1940. In 1904, Jeffrey purchased the Ohio Malleable Iron Company to ensure a reliable supply of iron for the production of their barrows and hand trucks. Ohio Malleable was located along the same railroad track as Jeffrey a few blocks north of First Avenue. In 1926, Jeffrey purchased a British company called the Diamond Coal Cutter Company, which was renamed the British Jeffrey Diamond Limited. A couple years later, J.A. Jeffrey retired and president of the company, Robert Gillespie stepped up. His first action as the figurehead was to invest two million dollars into the purchase of Galion Iron Works, a manufacturer of road rollers and graders for sale to local and state governments. Jeffrey Manufacturing survived the Great Depression and company prosperity continued into the immediate post war years. However, a new company called Jay Manufacturing moved into central Ohio and began challenging Jeffrey Manufacturing. Jeffrey began to fail when the company neglected to replace its underground coal hauler with the new rubber tired hauler, an innovation that would save the company time and money because the rubber tires did not require built tracks as mine shafts were extended. As the Jeffrey main branch began to fail, its subsidiaries excelled and kept the company afloat. In 1961, Jeffrey Manufacturing completely merged with the British Galion Company, creating the new corporate name of Jeffrey Galion, Inc.

The factories of Milo-Grogan were very successful and its employee-based neighborhoods were large, but the introduction of the Interstate 71 corridor caused a strain on the neighborhood. The interstate split the area nearly in half and several homes and businesses were demolished in the process. Layoffs were frequent after the demolition of many Milo-Grogan factories. Decreased housing availability due to I-71 construction caused the population to fall from 3850 to 3000 from 1970 to 1980. Many of the remaining families moved out of the Milo-Grogan area and into the nicer homes of the suburbs. Over 400 homes and businesses were lost to the completion of the freeway by 1964.

== Geography ==
The Milo-Grogan community area is defined by the rail corridor to the north, east, and west, and Interstate 670 to the south. For some purposes, Milo-Grogan's community area is often expanded to include a small community just northwest bounded by Eleventh Avenue to the north, Interstate 71 to the east, and a rail corridor to the south and west. Historically, Milo-Grogan was the separate communities of Milo and Grogan. Milo was located on the west side of present-day Milo-Grogan, while Grogan was located on its east side. Milo-Grogan is directly north of Downtown Columbus. It is bordered by Italian Village and Weinland Park to the west, The Fairgrounds and South Linden to the north, and Amercrest and the Devon Triangle to the east.

== Development ==
The City of Columbus has designated Milo-Grogan as a Community Reinvestment Area that is "ready for revitalization", with available 15-year, 100 percent tax abatements for all projects that include 10 percent affordable housing, with options to buy out of the requirement.

== Milo-Grogan Area Commission ==
The Milo-Grogan Area Commission serves the area as the community link to the city of Columbus. It holds monthly meetings that present information about topics that directly affect the Milo-Grogan Neighborhood, including information related to neighborhood redevelopment. The Milo-Grogan Area Commission, in partnership with the city of Columbus, also published the Milo-Grogan 2007 Neighborhood Plan, which established goals for the community for the next 10 years.

== Structures and landmarks ==
=== Milo Arts ===
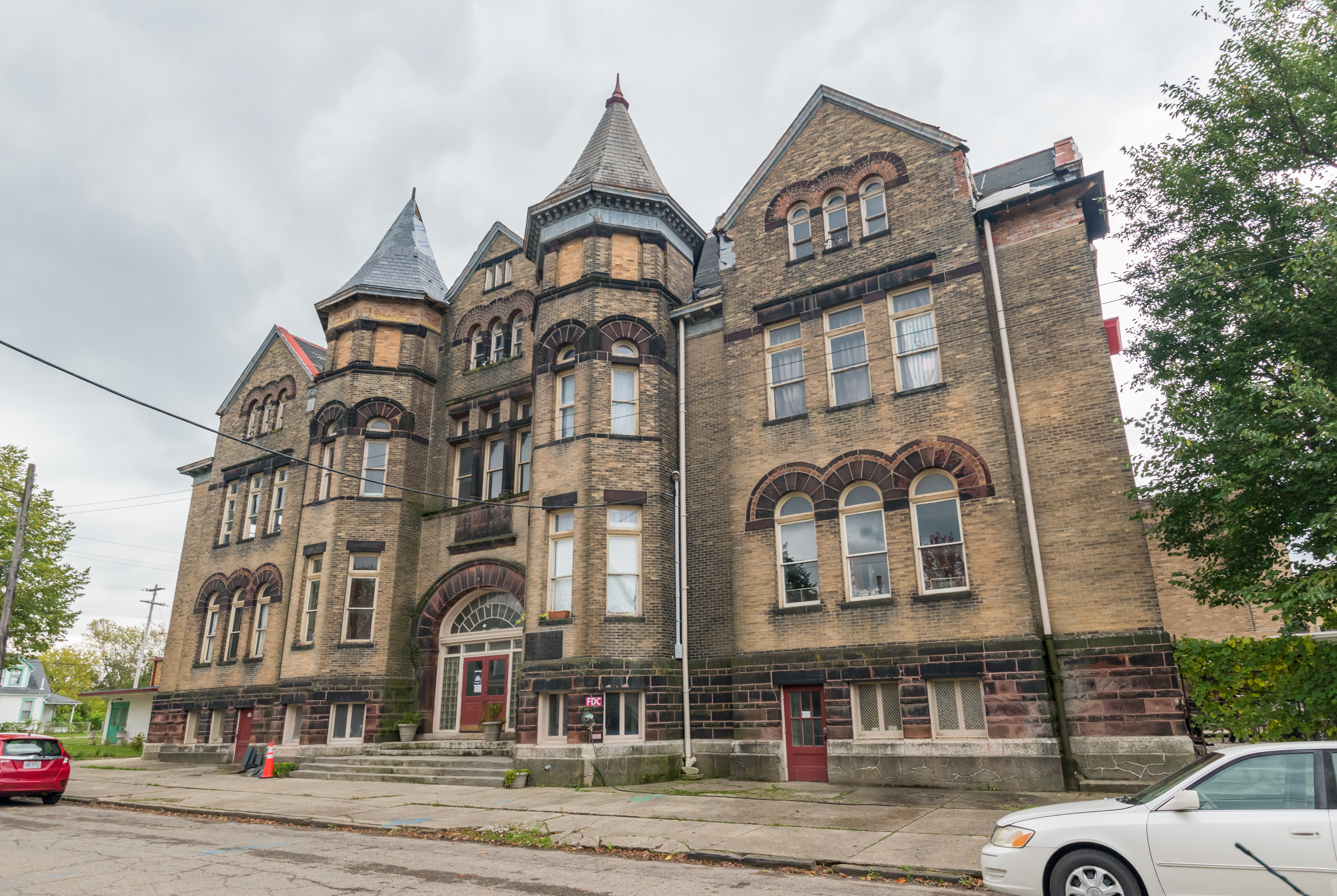
Milo Arts

Milo Arts is a community arts center that has hosted creative events in the visual and performing arts since 1988. Housed in the old Milo Public Elementary School, the center saw considerable change in 2000 and 2001 when city officials requested closure due to fire risk and building maintenance issues. Today, the center's studio space hosts 29 local artists who live and work in the building and offer educational opportunities to area youth.

It is, along with the former Columbus Railway Power and Light office and ticket office, one of the two most important historic structures in Milo-Grogan. It is a top priority for preservation for neighborhood leaders.

=== Streetcar office ===
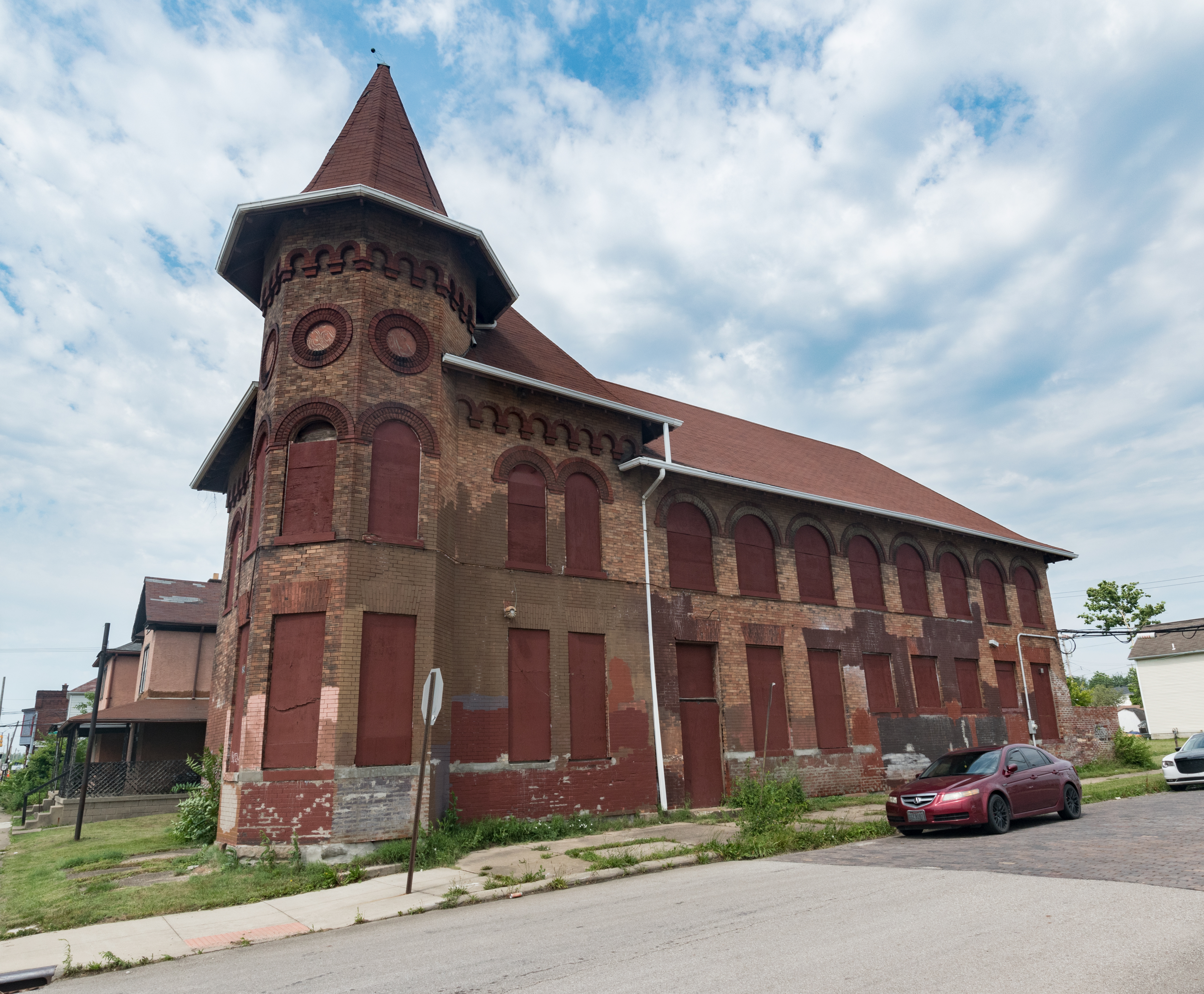
The former Columbus Railway, Power & Light office, 2021

The former Columbus Railway, Power & Light office is situated at 842 Cleveland Avenue. The two-story brick building has a steep gable roof and a tall rounded corner tower topped with a conical slate roof. It is located at the southern entrance to the neighborhood. It was built in the 1890s by the Columbus Central Railway Company, which became the Columbus Railway Power & Light Co. in 1914. The building was part of a complex of a power plant and streetcar barn during its operation; those buildings have since been demolished.

It is, along with the Milo Arts building, one of the two most important historic structures in Milo-Grogan. It is a top priority for preservation for neighborhood leaders.

=== Milo-Grogan Recreation Center ===
The Milo-Grogan Recreation Center is the primary public recreation facility in Milo-Grogan. The center operates a renovated neighborhood facility with a large number of public programs. The current facility includes an art room, ceramics room, craft room, gymnasium, kitchen, and weight room.
