= Italian Village =

- Neighborhood of Columbus
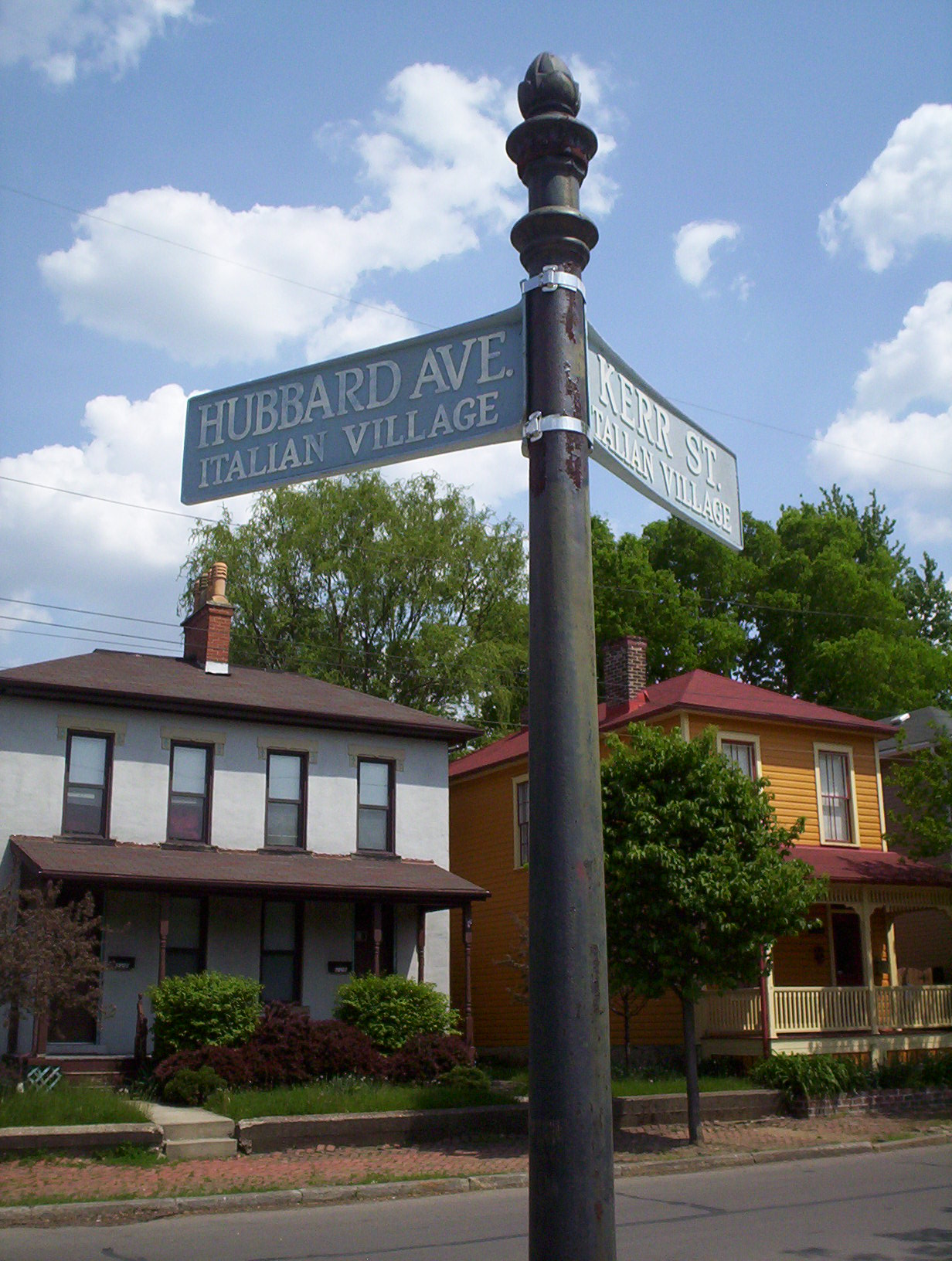
- Signage at Hubbard and Kerr on the corner of Italian Village Park
- Interactive map of Italian Village
- Coordinates: 39°59′N 83°01′W
- Country: United States
- State: Ohio
- County: Franklin
- City: Columbus
- ZIP Code: 43201 and 43215
- Area code: 614

Italian Village is a neighborhood in Columbus, Ohio, that contains an array of residential, commercial, and industrial buildings. It is a designated historic district, known for its historical and cultural preservation. The building types and architecture reflect Italian influence. With its parks and preserved historic homes, Italian Village has the highest home value appreciation in Columbus.

Italian Village is part of the Short North area. The neighboring Downtown district provides access to major employers, cultural and learning institutions, and entertainment venues.

== Geography ==
Italian Village is located in the north side of Columbus, Ohio just north of Downtown and adjacent to the central business district. The area is bounded by Interstate 670 on the south, Fifth Avenue on the north, North High Street on the west, and the Conrail railroad tracks to the east. N. Fourth Street, E. Fifth Avenue, and E. Second Avenue serve as primary corridors within the neighborhood's street system, which remains a grid street configuration. Specifically, N. Fourth Street is one of the primary routes through downtown while E. Fifth Avenue crosses both the Scioto and Olentangy Rivers. Both N. Fourth Street and E. Fifth Avenue contain residential, commercial, office, and industrial buildings.

=== Land use ===
Eighty percent of the buildings are residential, including single family homes, double houses, and row houses. Most residential uses are low density and located in the northwest as well as along the area's major corridors. Approximately ten percent of the buildings are commercial, which are concentrated along N. Fourth Street and E. Fifth Avenue. This is a higher land use than directed by its zoning code. The zoning code also calls for more than two thirds manufacturing, though industrial buildings are scattered throughout the area. Most manufacture uses are concentrated east of N. Sixth Street and north of E. Second Avenue, while others are found along N. Fourth Street and E. Fifth Avenue.

The City of Columbus has designated part of Italian Village, along with portions of the Short North and Victorian Village as a "market ready" Community Reinvestment Area, with available 15-year, 100 percent tax abatements if projects include 10 percent affordable housing, with options to buy out of the requirement.

== History ==
Italian Village was one of Columbus' first suburbs. The land was uninhabited until the Columbus-Worthington Pike (High Street) was built in 1823 and provided access to the area. With this road stimulating residential growth, the Italian Village area was annexed to Columbus in 1862. The North Columbus Street Railway Company, along with the progression of street car service, helped to develop Italian Village. By 1899, transportation had enabled a street system with extensive alleys that serviced horse stables behind residences. Entering the early 1900s, the Italian Village was a stable middle-class residential community. Its proximity to downtown ensured access to goods, services, and recreational facilities and provided employment opportunities. Electric trolleys carried residents to places that weren't within walking distance.

=== Residential life ===
Italian Village was once an immigrant neighborhood, named for its high concentration of Italian immigrants in its earliest days. However, the Italians were not the only ethnic group to occupy the Italian Village, nor were they the first. From around 1850–1870, the Irish resided in the southern part of the village as well as around Naughten Street (Goodale Boulevard), which was nicknamed "Irish Broadway." The Irish community then left the area, which made room for other residents. African American migrants then moved to the Italian Village area for work prospects, which consisted of railroad machinery and iron works. A small group of African Americans settled in the northeast section of the village and established the Bethany Baptist Colored Church in 1882. Later on, Italians were attracted to the neighborhood by employment opportunities that were within walking distance. In the 1890s, the first Italian immigrants moved from Flytown to the nearby Italian Village area and worked in stone quarries, construction trades, railroads, and local businesses on High Street. The quality of the Italian Village's buildings as well as its character can be attributed to Italian craftsmen. In 1896, St. John the Baptist Italian Catholic Church was founded and helped to form the Italian-American community. Additionally, the Great Depression brought attention to Italian cuisine because the home grown food was much less expensive. This food was sold locally at restaurants like Presutti's Villa Restaurant on West Fifth Avenue in Grandview and small groceries throughout Italian Village such as Salvatore's Grocery.

=== Employment ===
At the height of employment there were approximately 6,000 job opportunities in walking distance from the historic Italian Catholic Church. The Jeffrey Manufacturing Company, located at 274 East First Avenue, was a producer of coal mining equipment. At one point in time, Jeffrey's had the distinction of being the largest single employer in Columbus with 3,400 employees. The Clark Grave Vault/Clark Auto Equipment Company, located at 375 East Fifth Avenue, had 1,200 employees. On Fourth Street near Goodale Street was the Smith Brothers Hardware Company employing 500 people. The Berry Bolt Works at 30 East First Avenue had 240 employees. Immediately south of Jeffrey's factories, at Fourth and Warren Streets, was the Case Crane, Kilbourne & Jacobs Company with 200 employees. The Radio Cab Company on Fourth Street and the Columbus Burlap Bag Company next door had a combined total of 200 employees. Then directly across the street from Radio Cab, Producer's Oil sold gas for 16 cents a gallon. There were numerous other smaller businesses that brought employment opportunities.

=== Deterioration and revitalization ===
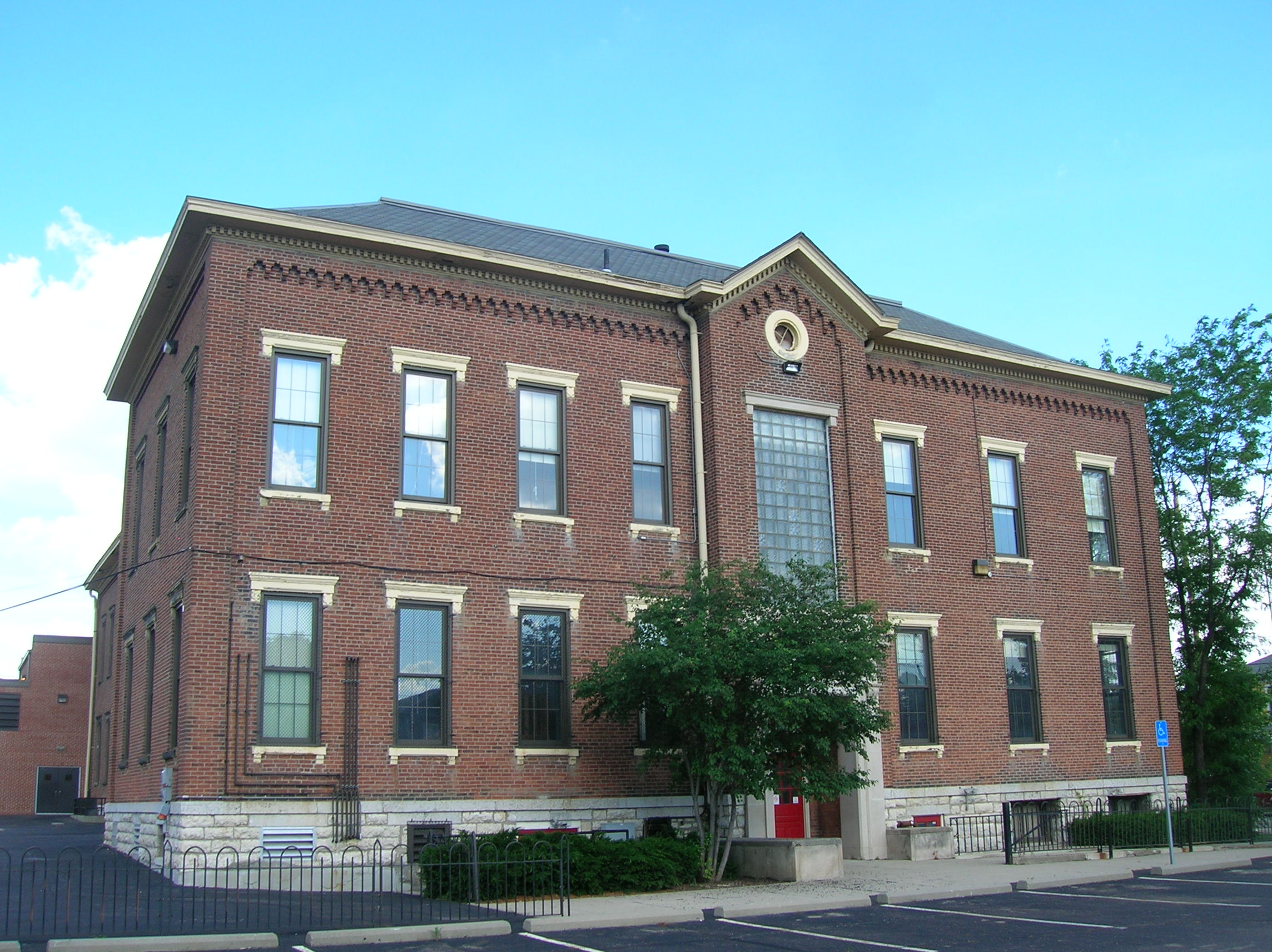
Second Avenue Elementary School

Although the Italian Village flourished in the 1940s, it began to decline after World War II. Society's mobility increased- original residents moved to the suburbs and lower-income families moved into Italian Village, some after being displaced from other neighborhoods. Large single family homes were converted into multiple family dwellings. Along with residential decline came a decrease in commercial vitality; the new residents did not have the money to support local businesses on High Street. In 1951–1952, Italian Village lost a portion of Russell, Lincoln, Brickel Swan, Goodale, and Poplar Streets to a slum clearance program for construction of the inner belt and urban renewal. Continuing into the 1960s, institutions were demolished and the population of Italian Village declined. Landlords became absent as did Catholic schoolchildren, and consequently Sacred Heart Grade School and High School closed down in 1973. Concerned with the destruction of historic buildings, neighborhood residents and property owners began to take action. They envisioned an improved neighborhood and formed the Italian Village Society in 1973 to preserve the historic value of the district. The Columbus City Council then formed the Italian Village Commission to further combat the deterioration of physical conditions. Soon after in 1974, the "Italian Village Development Plan" was created with the help of volunteers and Ohio State University students. The Development Plan defined common problems and proposed rehabilitation of historic structures as well as additional solutions including development of recreation facilities, improvement of transportation flow, and enforcement of housing condition codes. The Italian Village Society and Italian Village Commission helped to develop a sense of community. In 1978, Community Development funds identified the Italian Village target area and supported housing improvement efforts. By the beginning of the 1980s, the Italian Village once again attracted middle-income families to the neighborhood. Revitalization of the area earned the Short North an “All American City” designation.

The neighborhood's Second Avenue Elementary School was built in 1874. It is one of the oldest remaining school buildings in Columbus, built at the same time as the First Avenue School and Stewart Alternative Elementary School, also still extant.

== Structures and landmarks ==
=== St. John the Baptist Italian Catholic Church ===
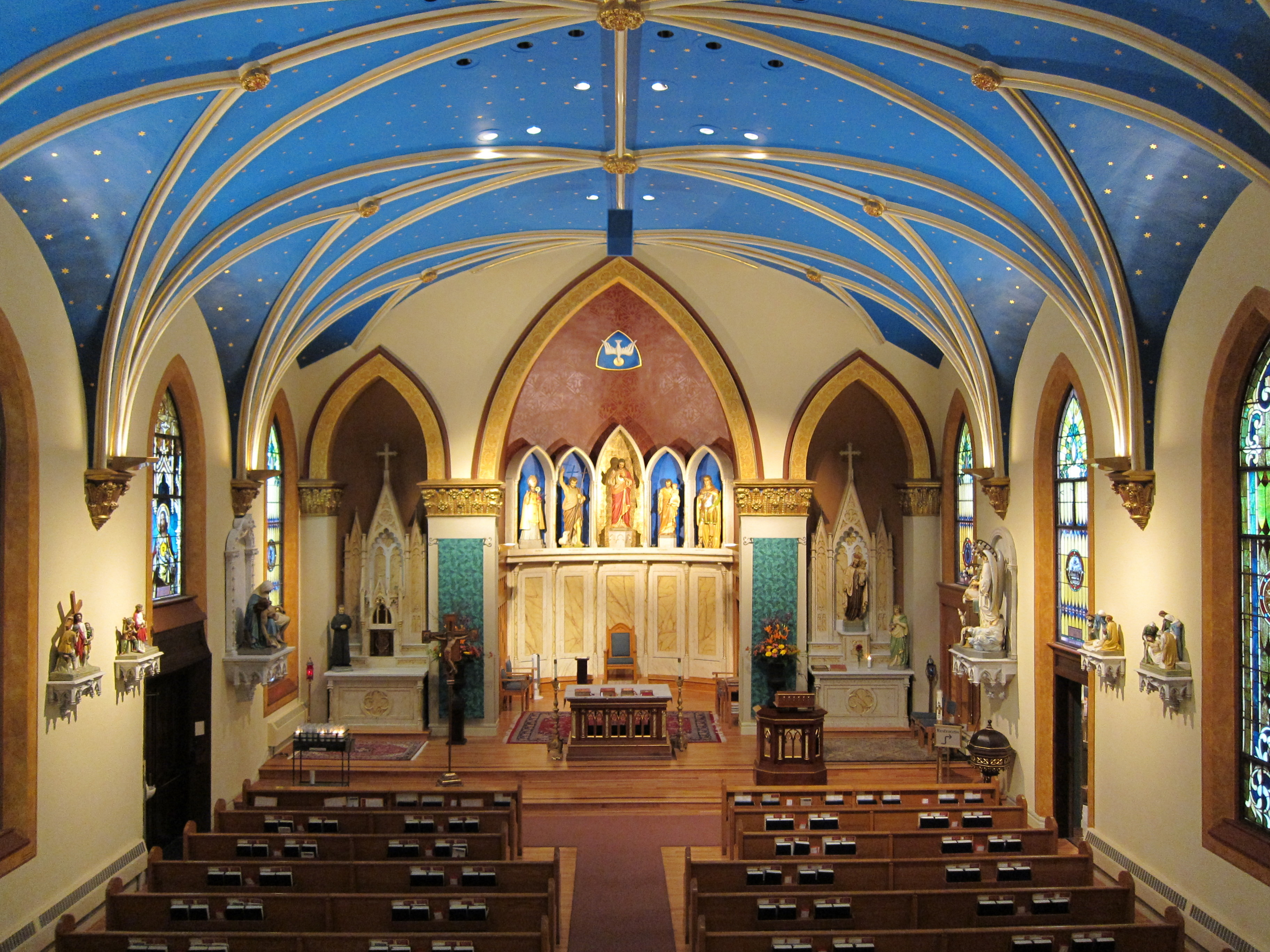
The nave of St. John the Baptist Italian Catholic Church.

Though Italian Village was a mixed ethnic area, it may have received its name from St. John the Baptist Italian Catholic Church. The church was founded in 1896 and subsequently built two years later, with much of the funding for its construction coming from prominent Italian immigrant buisnessman John Marzetti. It became the main landmark and most distinguishing feature of Italian Village. St. John's drew members were mostly from the Columbus’ Italian immigrant population, including the St. Clair Avenue neighborhood, Flytown, Grandview, and Marble Cliff areas. The mission of the church was to bring Italian immigrants together and give them opportunity to worship in their native language and with the practices familiar to them from their earlier lives in Italy. St. John's became the center of the Italian Catholic community. In keeping with Italian Catholic tradition still alive today, parishioners would walk to church in major processions on the feast day of St. John the Baptist and other feast days that were celebrated in their native Italian hometowns. Italian is still spoken in the halls after Mass at St. John the Baptist Church, but the congregation's American-born generations are replacing their native Italian predecessors.

=== The Berry Brothers Bolt Works building ===
The Berry Brothers Bolt Works building was constructed in 1888 and remains one of Columbus’ most prominent factory buildings, having been named a historic site in early 1988. The National Register of Historic Places deemed the building worthy because of its architecture, its place in local history, and its potential to be an industrial archaeological site. During its time of operation, the factory used original equipment to produce machine tools, like bolts, for factories that built buggies. Berry Brothers continued production even as cars replaced buggies. By 2004, the building had fallen into a state of disrepair. Capital Equities purchased the building and renovated led by anchor tenant WSA Studio, a local architecture firm known for historic renovations. The building is now fully occupied as a vibrant office complex.

=== Jeffrey Mining Administrative Office building ===
The Jeffrey Manufacturing Company, which produced coal mining equipment, was a major employer in the Italian Village area early in the 20th century. Located along North Fourth Street, Jeffrey Manufacturing had more than 3,000 employees. At one point in time, Jeffrey's had the distinction of being the largest single employer in Columbus. The administrative building that housed the company still stands today, making it a historic landmark in Italian Village.

=== Italian Village Park ===
The Italian Village Park, located within the confines of the district, is a public park that commemorates Carl Proto, a Columbus native. The park is centrally located and boasts a playground as well as picnicking facilities. The Italian Village Park Committee is responsible for maintaining the park. The committee accepts contributions and provides updates to residents. Recent grants have enabled perennial bed plantings, donated mowing, and other forms of lawn maintenance for the park.

== Architectural character ==
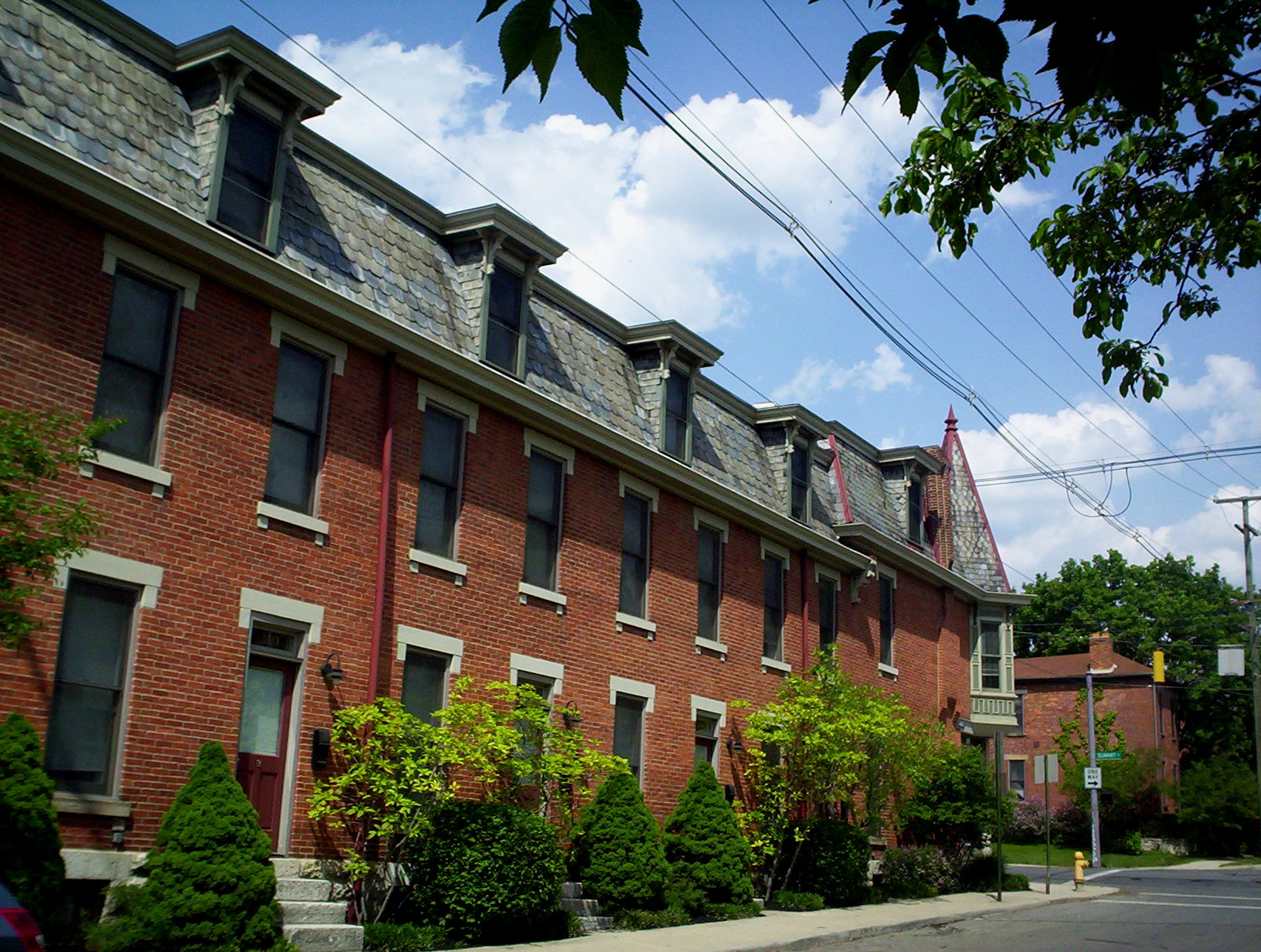
Italian Village rowhouse

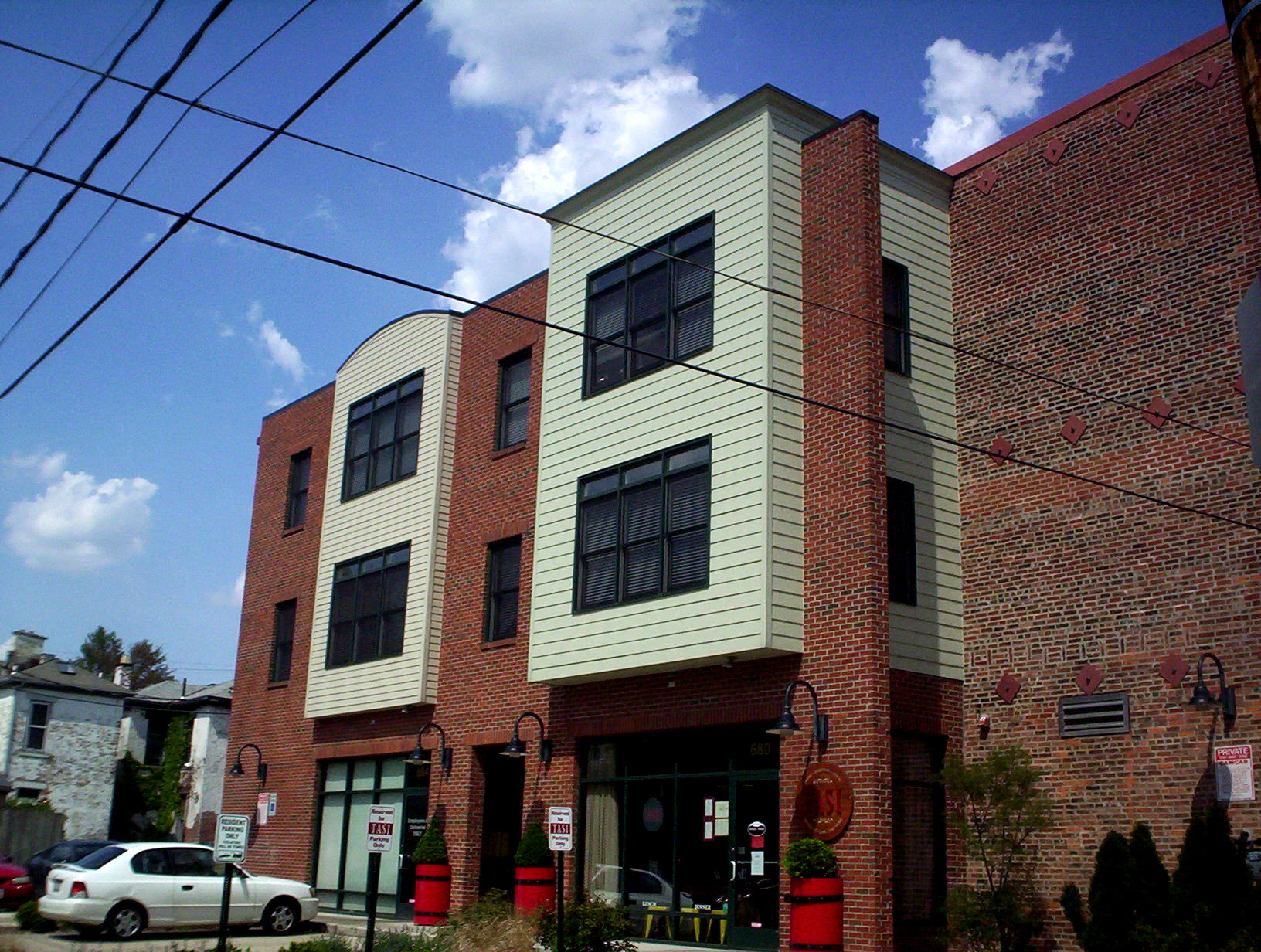
Tasi

The uniqueness of Italian Village can be attributed to its historic buildings, narrow brick streets, and pedestrian amenities like mature street trees and front porches. Its character also credits Italian style, which can be recognized in the mostly vernacular architecture of the neighborhood.

=== Residential ===
Residences in Italian Village are predominantly influenced by the Italianate and Queen Anne architectural styles. The Italianate style is defined by vertical proportions, asymmetrical floor plans, and low-pitched roofs as well as ornamental brackets at the cornice and decorative woodwork on porches. Characteristics of the Queen Anne style include steeply-pitch, irregularly shaped rooflines, asymmetrical massing, and numerous different window treatments. In Italian Village, residential buildings are set on narrow lots, close to each other and close to the street with alleys in the rear. Each house is typically two to two and a half stories high and has either a hipped or gabled roof, characteristic of Italianate style architecture. Rowhouses are constructed of brick with flat roofs and Italianate decorative cornices. The American Four Square House is common within the village, reflecting Italian architectural elements like the hipped/gabled roof and a broad front porch.

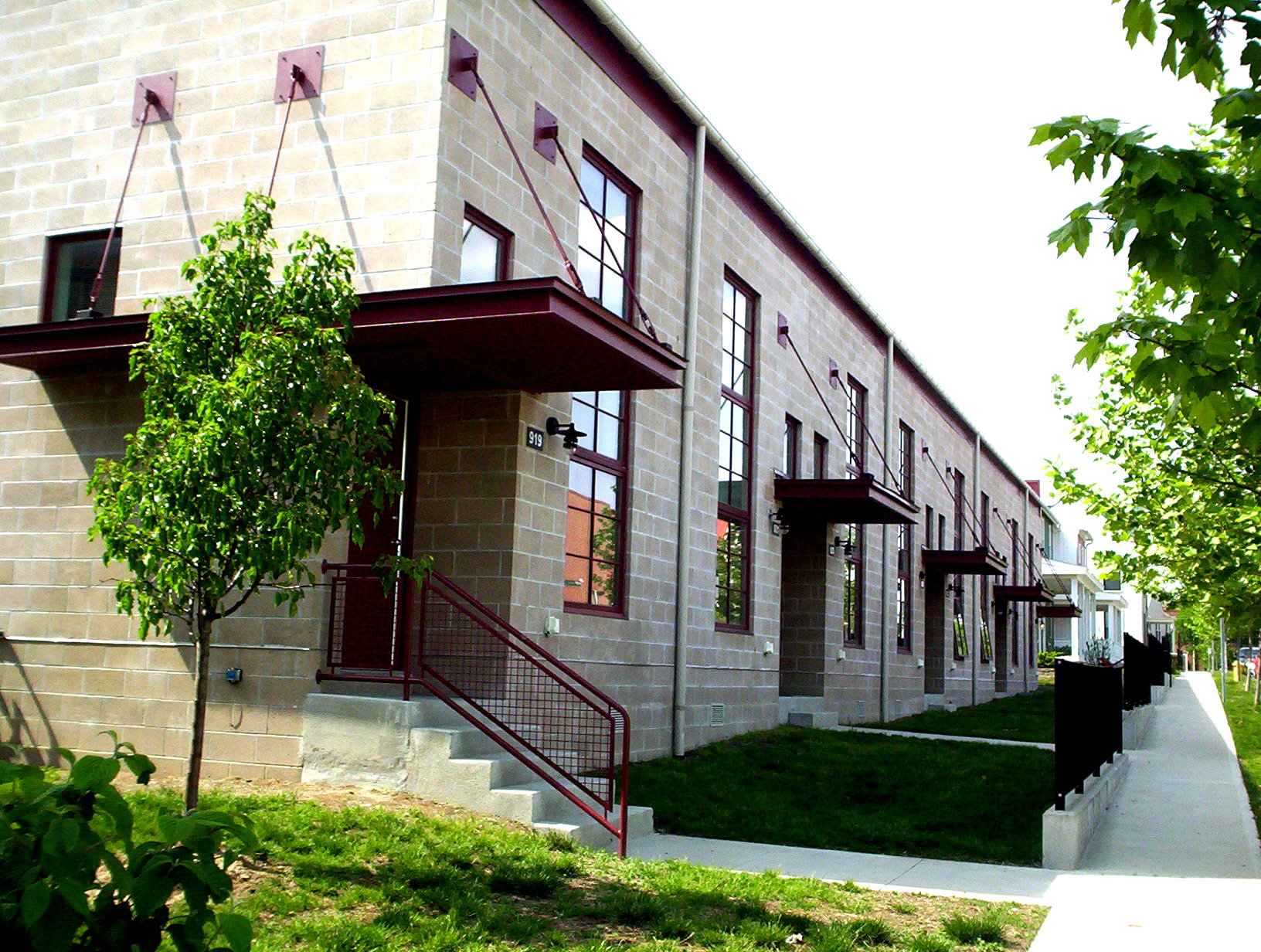
Mixed-income housing

=== Commercial/industrial ===
Some commercial buildings reflect Italianate or even Victorian styles in their architecture, but many were renovated after High Street was widened in 1920. Buildings tend to be two to four stories high with a storefront at the base, an upper façade, and a building cornice or parapet at the top. Masonry construction with details of wood, brick, stone, or metal characterize these commercial buildings. Storefronts are almost always articulated into bays with large expanses of glass while upper floors resemble residential buildings with regularly spaced windows. Most industrial buildings are also two to four stories high and of the same masonry construction with many windows, some wood and some metal. Several industrial structures have brackets or decorative brickwork, reflections of Italianate cornice detail.

== Entertainment ==
Alfonso Pishtelli, one of the first residents of Italian Village, recalls attending concerts at Goodale Park and Italian festivals on St. Clair Avenue with his family and friends. “[They] looked forward to Saturdays because typically it would be mostly weddings when people [could] get together.” The Columbus Italian Festival is still held today and the Italian Village Society puts on Holiday Potlucks. Salsa Saturdays are held on Lincoln Street. There are multiple restaurants and bars in Italian Village itself, as well as art galleries. Most of these are local businesses.

The neighborhood also offers other opportunities for entertainment within the Short North including theaters, farmers markets, and pocket parks. Nearby, Downtown Columbus is home to Nationwide Arena and the Columbus Convention Center.

== Gallery ==
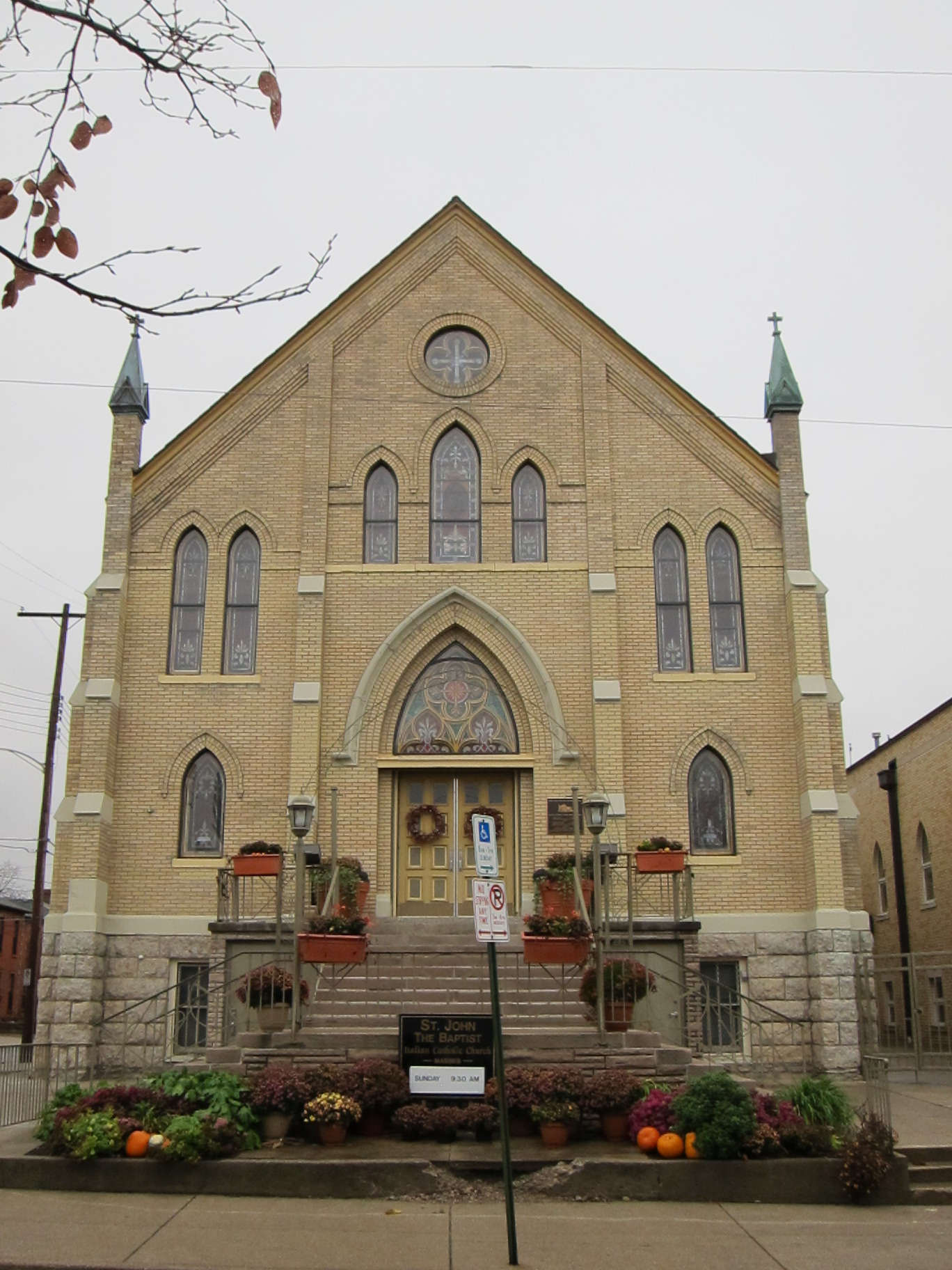
Saint John the Baptist Italian Catholic Church

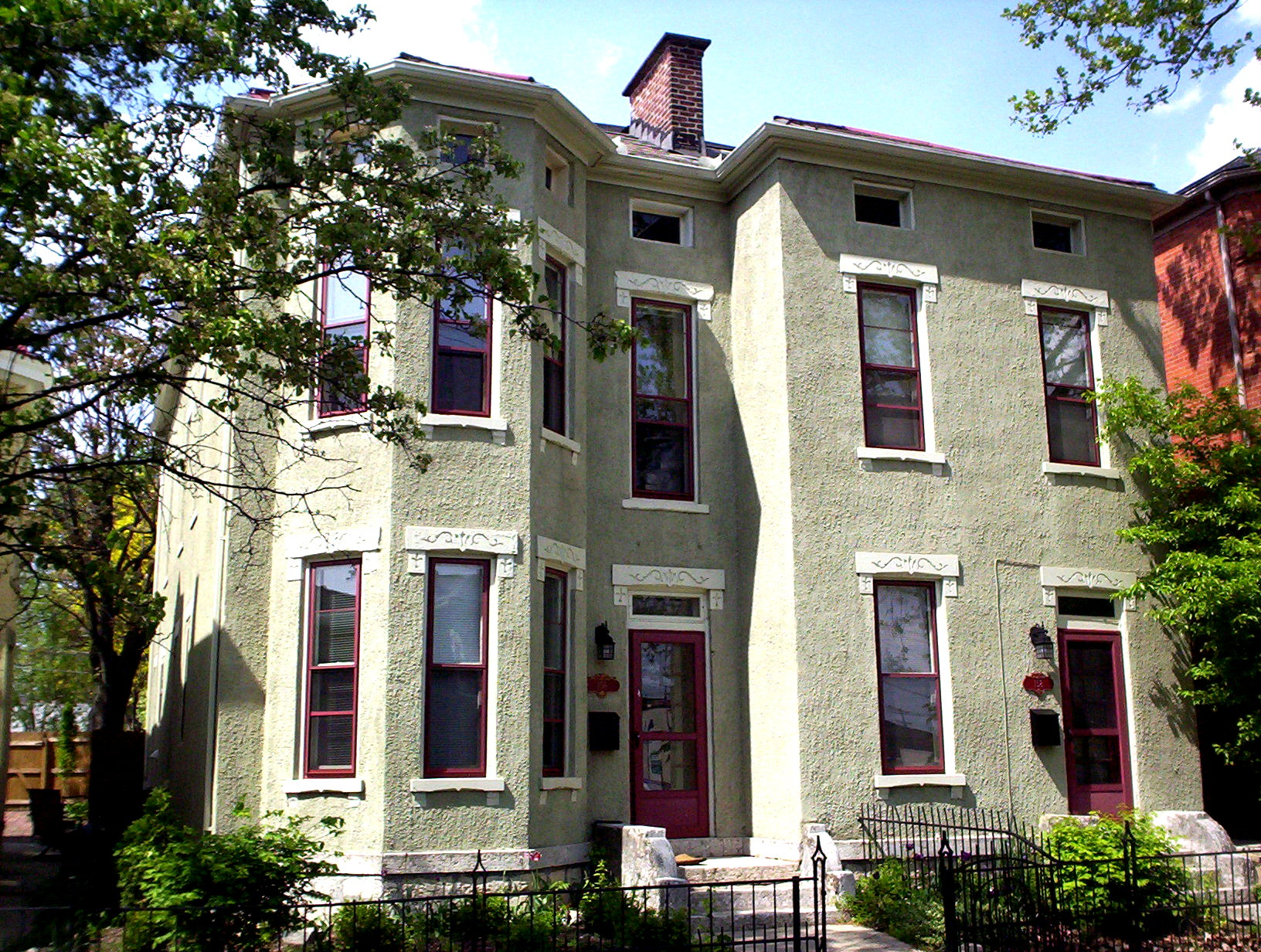
A house in Italian Village
