= Jeffrey Manufacturing Company Office Building =

- U.S. National Register of Historic Places
- Columbus Register of Historic Properties
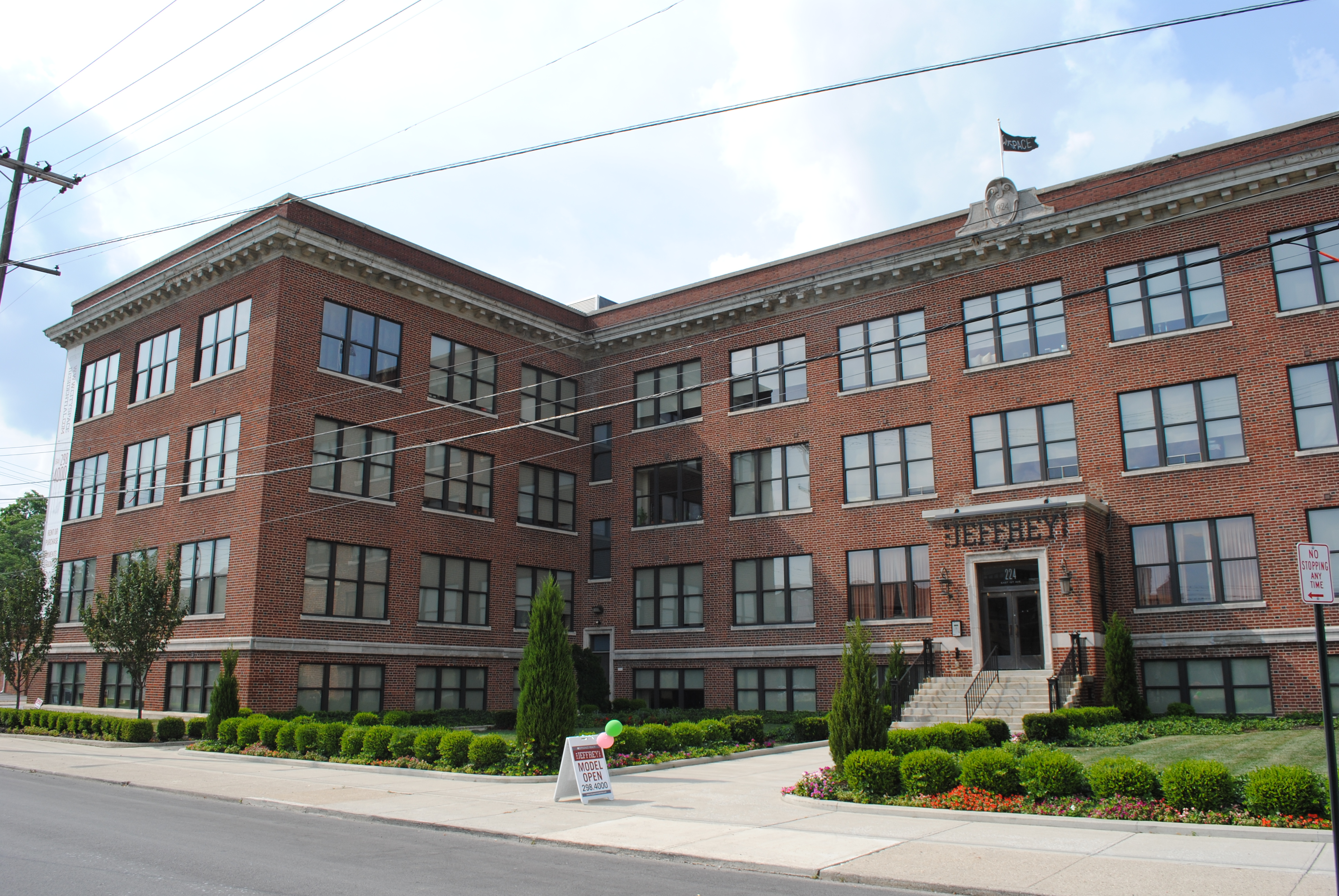
- Interactive map highlighting the building's location
- Location: 224 E. 1st Ave., 883 and 895 N. 6th St., Columbus, Ohio
- Coordinates: 39.980908°N 82.997818°W
- Built: 1924
- NRHP reference No.: 01000379
- CRHP No.: CR-66

Significant dates
- Added to NRHP: April 12, 2001
- Designated CRHP: September 21, 2015

The Jeffrey Manufacturing Company Office Building is a historic building in the Italian Village neighborhood of Columbus, Ohio. The building, originally used for the Jeffrey Manufacturing Company, was listed on the National Register of Historic Places in 2001 and the Columbus Register of Historic Properties in 2015.

== See also ==
- National Register of Historic Places listings in Columbus, Ohio
