= Henry Neil Mallon =

American businessman (1895–1983)

- Born: January 11, 1895; Cincinnati, Ohio, U.S.
- Died: March 1, 1983 (aged 88); Dallas, Texas, U.S.
- Resting place: Restland Memorial Park, Dallas, Texas, U.S.
- Education: Yale University
- Occupation: Businessman
- Political party: Republican
- Spouse: Anne Virginia Wrightson

Henry Neil Mallon (January 11, 1895 – March 1, 1983) was an American businessman. He served as the chair of the board, president, and director of Dresser Industries (Cleveland, OH) (now Halliburton).

== Early life ==
Henry Neil Mallon was born in Cincinnati on January 11, 1895. He graduated from Yale University, where he became friends with Prescott Bush. He joined the United States Army during World War I where he rose to the rank of major.

== Career ==
Mallon served as chair of the board, president, and director of Dresser Industries. He was also the president of Dresser Manufacturing Limited (Toronto, Ontario, Canada); the chair of the board, director, Bryant Heater Company (Cleveland, Ohio); factory manager, general manager, director 20–29, US Can Company (Cincinnati, Ohio); 19–20 w/Continental Can Company (Chicago, Illinois); Director, Bovaud & Seyfang Manufacturing Company (Bradford, Pennsylvania), Clark Brothers Inc (Olean, New York), Day & Night Manufacturing Company (Monrovia, California), International Derrick & Equipment Company (Columbus, Ohio), Kobe, Inc (Huntington Park, California), Pacific Pumps, Inc (CA), Roots-Connersville Blower Corporation (Connersville, Indiana), Security Engineering Company (Whittier, California), Stacey Brothers, Gus Construction Company (Cincinnati, Ohio), Pharis Tire & Rubber Company (Newark, Ohio), Petrolite Corporation (St. Louis, Missouri), Magazines of Industry (New York City), Hydrocarbon Research Inc (New York City), Carthage Hydrocol Corporation (New York City).

Mallon hired George Herbert Walker Bush to work for Dresser Industries in West Texas shortly after he graduated from Yale University. He was also an early investor in Zapata Corporation, founded by Bush. Bush in turn named one of his sons, Neil Mallon Bush, after his mentor.

== Death ==
Mallon died on March 1, 1983, due to cancer, aged 88, in Dallas, Texas.
