= Dresser Industries =

Former American energy corporation

Dresser Industries was a multinational corporation headquartered in Dallas, Texas, United States, which provided a wide range of technology, products, and services used for developing energy and natural resources. In 1998, Dresser merged with its main rival Halliburton. Halliburton sold many of former Dresser non "oil patch" divisions, retaining the M W Kellogg Engineering and Construction Company and the Dresser oil-patch products and services that complemented Halliburton's energy and natural resource businesses. In 2001 Halliburton sold five separate, but somewhat related former Dresser non "oil patch" divisions, to an investment banking firm. Those five operations later took the name "Dresser Inc." In October 2010, Dresser Inc., was acquired by General Electric. It is headquartered in Addison, Texas.

== History ==
Solomon Robert Dresser invented a "packer", using rubber for a tight fit, and after taking out a patent on May 11, 1880, he began advertising and selling his product, the Dresser Cap Packer, from Bradford, Pennsylvania, in the heart of the oilfields. Dresser's packer was one of many available on the market, and it was another invention that saw a substantial expansion of the company. A flexible coupling, the Dresser Joint, that he built in 1885 to join pipes together in such a way that they would not leak natural gas. This coupling also used rubber for a tight fit, and it was so successful that it permitted for the first time the long-range transmission of natural gas from the gas fields where it was extracted to the cities which were the main gas consumers.

As the natural gas industry prospered and expanded after 1900, Dresser's company grew as pipelines were built over great distances. By 1927 the company's annual sales had reached US$3.7 million and it was employing 400 workers.

=== Public offering ===
Following Dresser's death, his descendants decided to sell it, and in 1928 the Wall Street investment-banking firm of W. A. Harriman and Company, Inc., converted the firm into a public company by issuing 300,000 shares of stock. Prescott Bush, father of former US President George H.W. Bush, was involved in organizing the IPO and was on the board of directors of the company for 22 years. H.W. Bush began working in sales for the company in 1950.

H. Neil Mallon was selected as president and chief executive officer; he held that position until his retirement in 1962. Under Mallon, Dresser began a program of acquisitions designed to help it survive the threat posed to its core business by the introduction of welding for joining pipes together. Starting in 1930 Dresser began acquiring companies that manufactured valves, heaters, pumps, engines and compressors and the company diversified into such products as oil derricks, blowers, drill bits, refractories, and drilling mud.

=== Three Mile Island accident ===
In 1979, a partial nuclear meltdown occurred in at the Three Mile Island Nuclear Generating Station, located on the Susquehanna River in Londonderry Township, Dauphin County near Harrisburg, Pennsylvania in what became known as the Three Mile Island accident.

The accident began with failures in the non-nuclear secondary system, followed by a pilot-operated relief valve (PORV) that had been manufactured by Dresser Industries being stuck open and unable to be shut.

=== Roach v. Dresser Ind. Valve & Instrument Division ===
In 1976, prior to the Three Mile Island accident, Calvin J. Roach, a manager of industrial engineering was fired after being asked to investigate the failure of multiple Dresser valves and reporting the reason as being poor quality control. During a meeting with his boss who wished for him to retract his findings, Roach was called an ethnic slur for Cajuns to which he objected and was fired.

After this incident, Roach filed a lawsuit against Dresser Industries alleging discrimination based on national origin. The attorneys for Dresser Industries challenged the case on grounds that Cajuns could not be considered a federally protected national minority because their homeland, Acadia, had never been an independent nation as a colony of France.

In the landmark decision, the court ruled that the case could be heard on merits stating that identifying of a regional group rather than sovereignty qualified as national origin. The case ultimately settled outside of court.

== Acquisitions and divestitures ==
In 1949, Dresser's management was presented with an opportunity to broaden its product range beyond capital purchases. They were made aware of the potential to acquire the Magnet Cove Barium Corporation of Houston, Texas, the nation's second-largest producer of barite drilling mud. One of the partners was interested in selling their approximate one-third interest, which led to discussions with the owners about the possibility of selling the entire company. With Dresser's strong cash position, they began to explore the acquisition of Magnet Cove Barium. It held mineral reserves constituting 30 percent of the known U.S. barite deposits, and the 5 ½ million tons of barite could last thirty-eight more years at the current recoverable bar level of operations. The company reported current assets of $3.2 million and liabilities of $909,000. When it was learned that all of the Magnet Cove Barium's common stock could be acquired for $2.8 million in cash, the directors of Dresser quickly, without hesitation, approved the transaction on October 28, 1949. Five days later, the deal was done. Dresser had added Magnet Cove Barium to the Dresser Industries family.

In 1950, the company headquarters moved to Dallas to be near the center of the nation's major oil and gas fields. It continued to purchase well-known companies involved in manufacturing such things as overhead cranes, gasoline-dispensing pumps, and heavy equipment for mining and construction.

In 1968, the Wayne Oil Tank and Pump Company, established in 1891, merged with Dresser, becoming the Dresser-Wayne Company. Dresser Industries brought together Lane-Wells and the Pan Geo Atlas Corporation (PGAC) to form Dresser Atlas. PGAC's expertise in openhole logging and its international operations made it an ideal merger partner to form an integrated wireline services company. Since its inception, Lane-Wells had generated most of its income from perforating services, but log interpretation had narrowed down producing zones, resulting in fewer perforations and less revenue. Greatly expanded wireline logging capabilities helped the combined company continue to grow.

In 1974, the company acquired the operating assets of the Jeffrey Manufacturing Company and its subsidiary the Galion Iron Works. By 1975, Dresser's total sales exceeded $2 billion, with profits of more than $123 million. Those sales came 28% from petroleum operations, 21% from industrial specialties, 24% from energy processing and conversion, 15% from construction and mining, and 12% from refractories and minerals.

During the 1980s, as the oil industry began to decline, Dresser's chairman, John Murphy, began to streamline the organization of the company, eliminating its insurance, mining, and construction-equipment divisions.

In 1982, the company acquired International Harvester's construction equipment business. In 1984 the company acquired the earthmoving and mining product lines from American Standard's WABCO division, for a bargain price of $66.3 million.

On January 1, 1987, Dresser Industries and Ingersoll-Rand merged their common businesses to form Dresser-Rand Group with headquarters in Corning, New York. The newly formed company had 10 manufacturing and testing facilities, 70 sales offices, 30 service centers and more than 7,300 employees. The partnership started as a 50-50 relationship, but later Dresser took a 51% share of the assets while Ingersoll-Rand had 49%.

Komatsu Limited and Dresser Industries established Komatsu Dresser to make mining tractors, construction equipment and related equipment. This 50-50 ownership lasted from September 1988 to August 1994, when Komatsu bought out Dresser's share.

By 1993, it generated sales of more than US$4 billion, and employed 31,800 people in fifty countries. The company had three major divisions: Oil Field Products and Services, Industrial Operations, and Energy Processing and Conversion Equipment. It spun off some of its manufacturing divisions, but crucially agreed to retain asbestos claims filed before the spinoff.

In 1994, the company expanded through acquisitions of Wheatley TXT (a manufacturer of pumps, valves, and metering equipment) and the Baroid Corporation (an oil-services firm in Houston that had been a direct competitor). To comply with federal antitrust regulations, Dresser sold off its interest in M-I Drilling Fluids Company and Western Atlas International. Upon completion of the Baroid merger, Dresser became the third-largest oil-services company in the world.

=== Merger with Halliburton ===
In 1998, Dresser merged with its main rival Halliburton and became known as Halliburton Company. Dick Cheney negotiated the US$7.7 billion deal, reportedly having done so during a weekend of quail-hunting. In 2001, Halliburton was forced to settle the asbestos lawsuits that it acquired including the landmark case Bell v. Dresser Industries as a result of purchasing Dresser, causing the company's stock price to fall by eighty percent in just over a year.

== The "New" Dresser ==
Dresser Inc.
- Founded: 2001 (but see article)
- Headquarters: Addison, Texas
- Key people: President, CEO and Director - John P. Ryan SVP Human Resources - Mark J. Scott
- Revenue: US$2bn (2007)
- Number of employees: 6,400 (2007)
- Website: Dresser Inc.

In April 2001, the Dresser division (excluding the former Kellogg division) entered an agreement to separate itself once again from Halliburton by management purchasing its equity, the new company was called Dresser, Inc. It was a leading global multi-national owned by First Reserve Corporation and company management.

In February 2011, General Electric Co. agreed to buy oil-field equipment maker Dresser Inc. for $3 billion, expanding its biggest industrial unit. GE acquired Dresser from funds managed by Riverstone Holdings LLC and First Reserve Corporation. The move significantly expanded GE's offerings for energy and industrial customers worldwide and is the latest in a series of acquisitions over the last 10 years that have transformed GE's global energy portfolio.

The Dresser brand sells, services, and supports products that include: actuators, valves, meters, instruments, regulators, switches, natural gas-fueled engines, piping specialties, retail and fleet fuel dispensers, blowers, and point-of-sale systems.

The Dresser brand operates in more than 60 countries with four principal business segments: Measurement and Distribution Systems, Flow Technologies, Infrastructure Solutions, and Power and Compression Systems. It retains trade names of Masoneilan, Consolidated, Becker, Mooney, ROOTS, and Wayne fuel pumps.

== See also ==
- List of oilfield service companies
- Dresser Atlas
