= Jeffrey Manufacturing Company =

American industrial equipment company

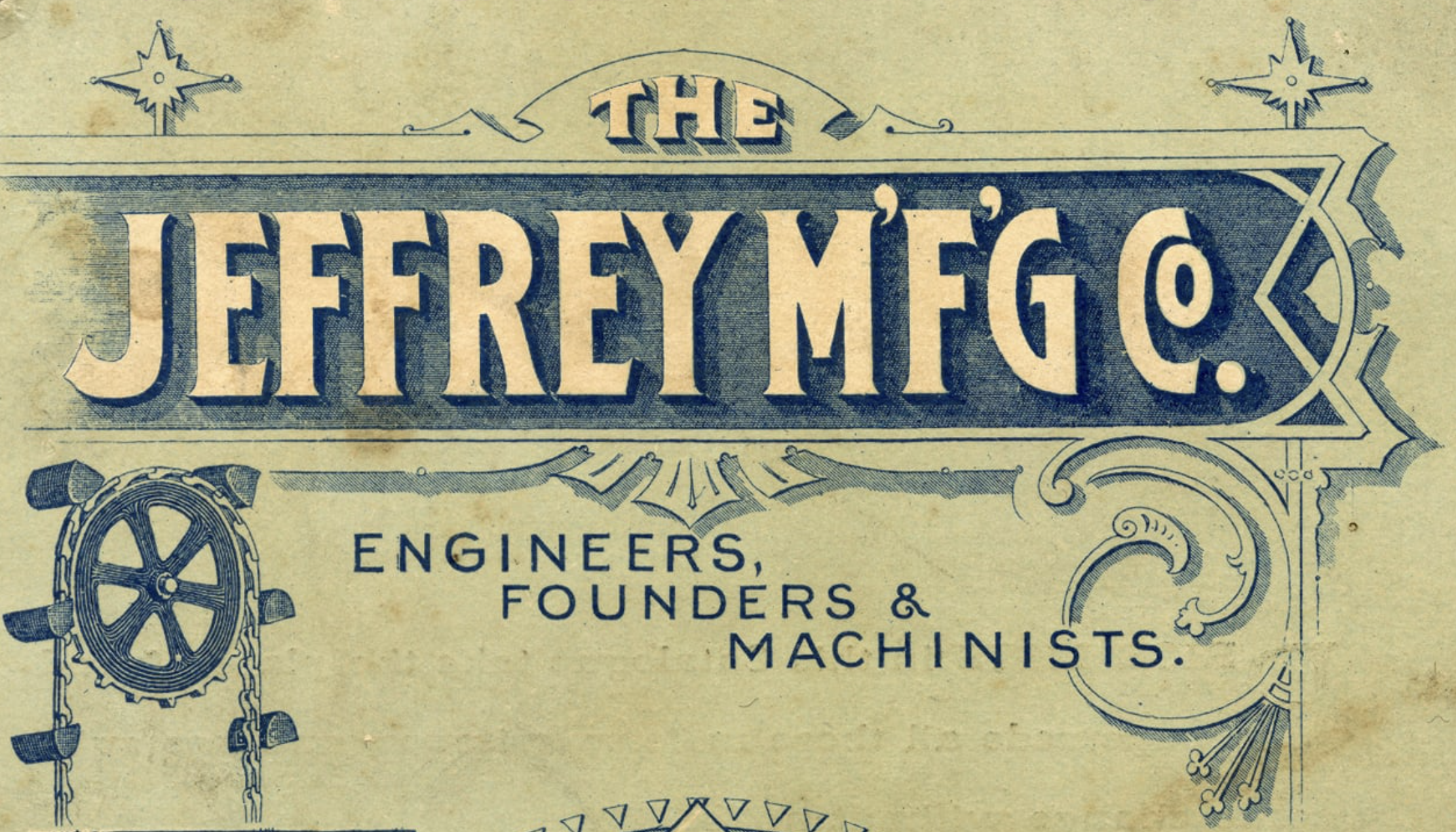
- Founded: 1878
- Founder: Joseph A. Jeffrey
- Defunct: 1974
- Fate: Acquired
- Successor: Dresser Industries
- Headquarters: Columbus, Ohio
- Products: Coal cutting equipment and mining locomotives

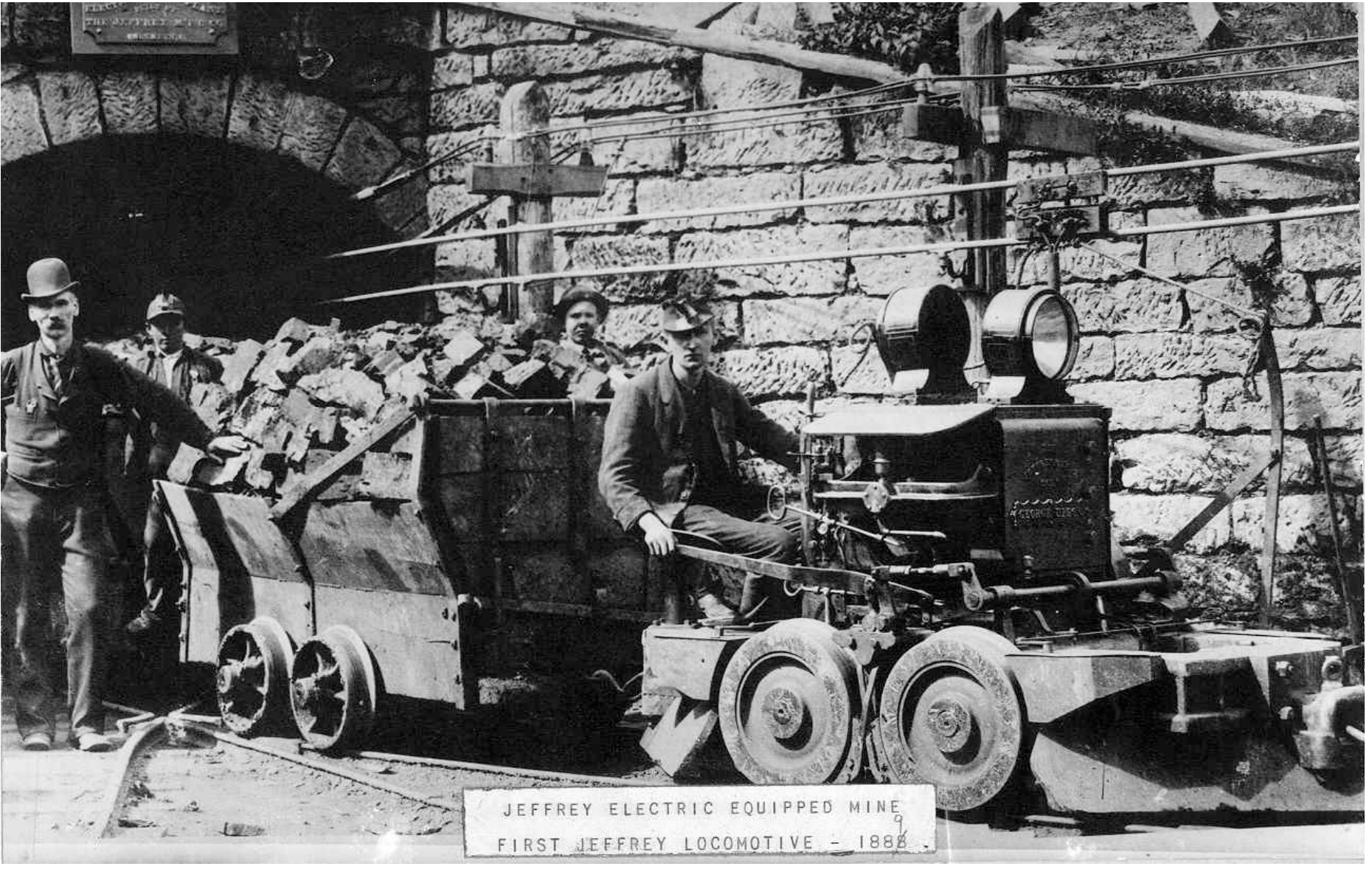
The first electric mine locomotive produced by the Jeffrey Manufacturing Company, in 1888

The Jeffrey Manufacturing Company, was an American industrial equipment manufacturing company, at one time the largest producer of coal cutting machines and mining locomotives in the world. It was established in 1878 as the Lechner Mining Machine Company, based in Columbus, Ohio, and is credited with producing America's first power-driven coal cutter.

== History ==
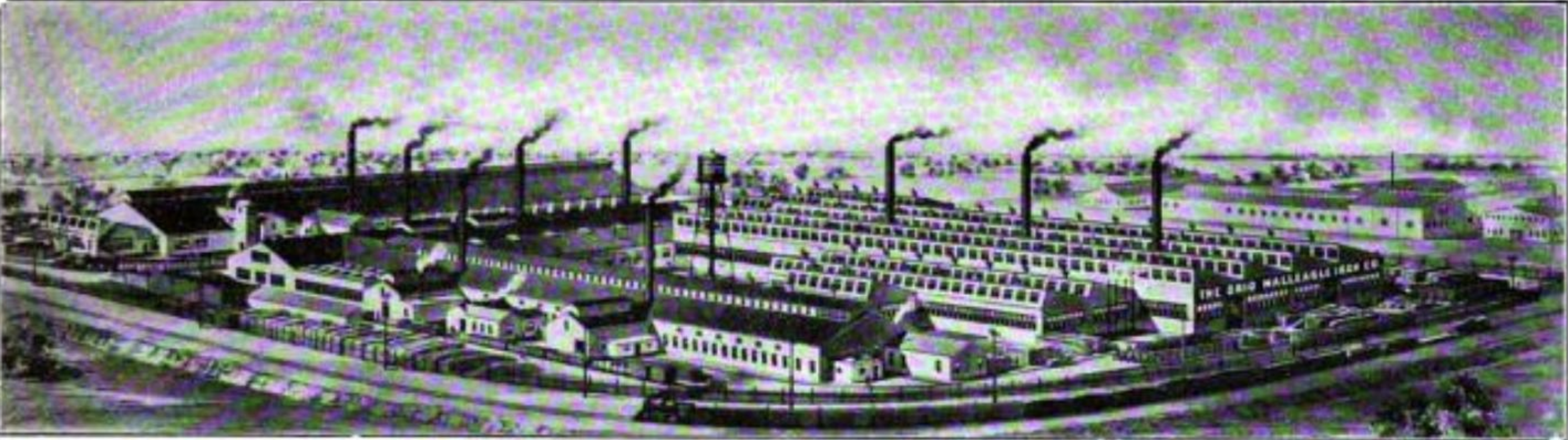
The Jeffrey Manufacturing Company plant in Columbus, Ohio in 1911

Joseph Andrew Jeffrey was born in Clarksville, Ohio on January 17, 1836. After high school he worked at the Commercial National Bank in Columbus. In 1876, he saw a model of a compressed-air mining machine, created by inventor Francis Lechner Jeffrey contacted Lechner and offered to finance the development of his machine.

In 1878, Jeffrey partnered with F.C. Sessions to purchase the patent and other rights to the coal cutting machine from Lechner, and they formed the Lechner Mining Machine Company to produce it. The Lechner machine used a chain drive for the coal cutting heads and was the first practical coal cutter. The chain drive was later adapted for use in feed mills and on Mississippi rear-wheel paddle boats.

In 1880, they reorganized the company and renamed it the Jeffrey Manufacturing Company, and moved into a new factory in the Milo-Grogan area of Columbus. It was formally incorporated in 1887. In the 1880s, the new company developed an early conveyor belt using its chain drive. In 1888, the Portage Strawboard Company had over 2 miles of Jeffrey Conveyor installed. The company was an early adopter of electric motors, and one of the first American manufacturers to build a mining locomotive powered from an overhead wire, in 1888. This was followed by a line of electrically-driven coal mining machines.

By 1911, the company's plant in Columbus occupied more than 30 acres. The main machine shop was more than 700 feet (210 m) long and 200 feet (61 m) wide. The plant had an internal railway more than 10 miles long, used to transfer material between departments. The company produced conveyor belts, power transmission systems, mining machinery and locomotives.

At the start of World War One, the company was the largest producer of mining locomotives and coal cutting machines in the world.

By 1920, the company employed nearly 4,000 workers.

Joseph Jeffrey died in 1928, but ownership of the company passed to his children.

In 1962, the company expanded production. It opened a new plant costing US$2,500,000 (equivalent to US$30,310,150 in 2025), in Woodruff, South Carolina and another plant manufacturings its steel thimble roller chains, in Morristown, Tennessee.

In 1974, Dresser Industries of Dallas acquired the operating assets of the Jeffrey Manufacturing Company.

== Acquisitions ==
In 1904, the company acquired the Ohio Malleable Iron Company which supplied Jeffrey with chain components.

In 1923, Jeffrey acquired the bankrupt Kilbourne and Jacobs Manufacturing Co.

In 1926, the company acquired the British coal machine manufacturer The Diamond Coal Cutter Company Limited of Wakefield, and renamed it the British Jeffrey-Diamond Company. On December 28 that year, they also acquired the Galion Iron Works, which built road rollers and graders. Between 1951 and 1962, 80% of the Jeffrey Manufacturing Company's income came from these two subsidiaries.

== Office building ==
The company's office building in Columbus was listed on the National Register of Historic Places in 2001 and the Columbus Register of Historic Properties in 2015.

== Products ==
The Jeffrey company produced a wide range of products over the nearly century of its existence, mostly focused on mining applications.

=== Coal cutting machines ===
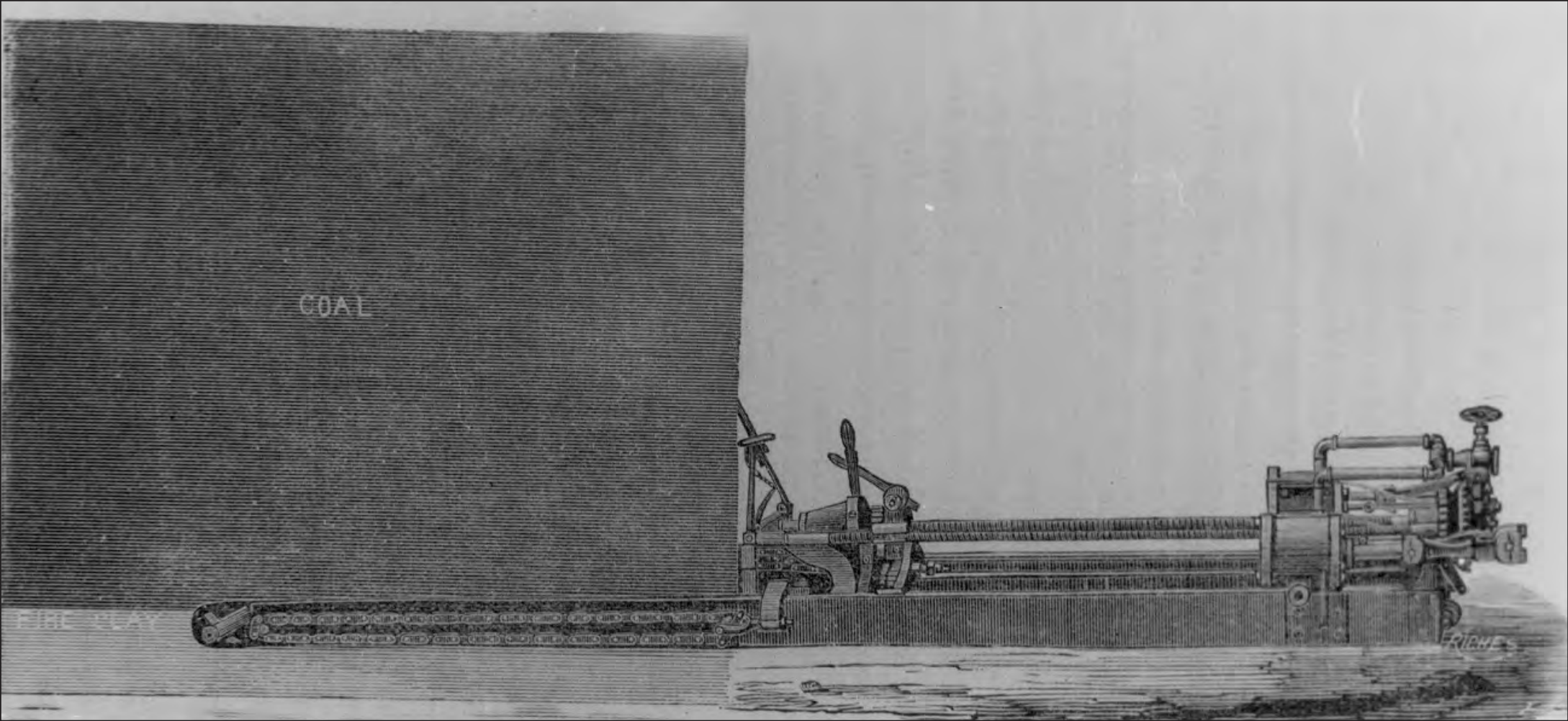
The Lechner coal cutting machine, developed in 1877

The company was founded to build the Lechner coal cutting machine. This was the first successful mechanized coal cutting machine, initially deployed to the Central Mining Co. in New Straitsville, Ohio.

=== Chains ===
Jeffrey was claimed to be the world's largest manufacturer of chains in the early 1960s.

=== Mining locomotives ===
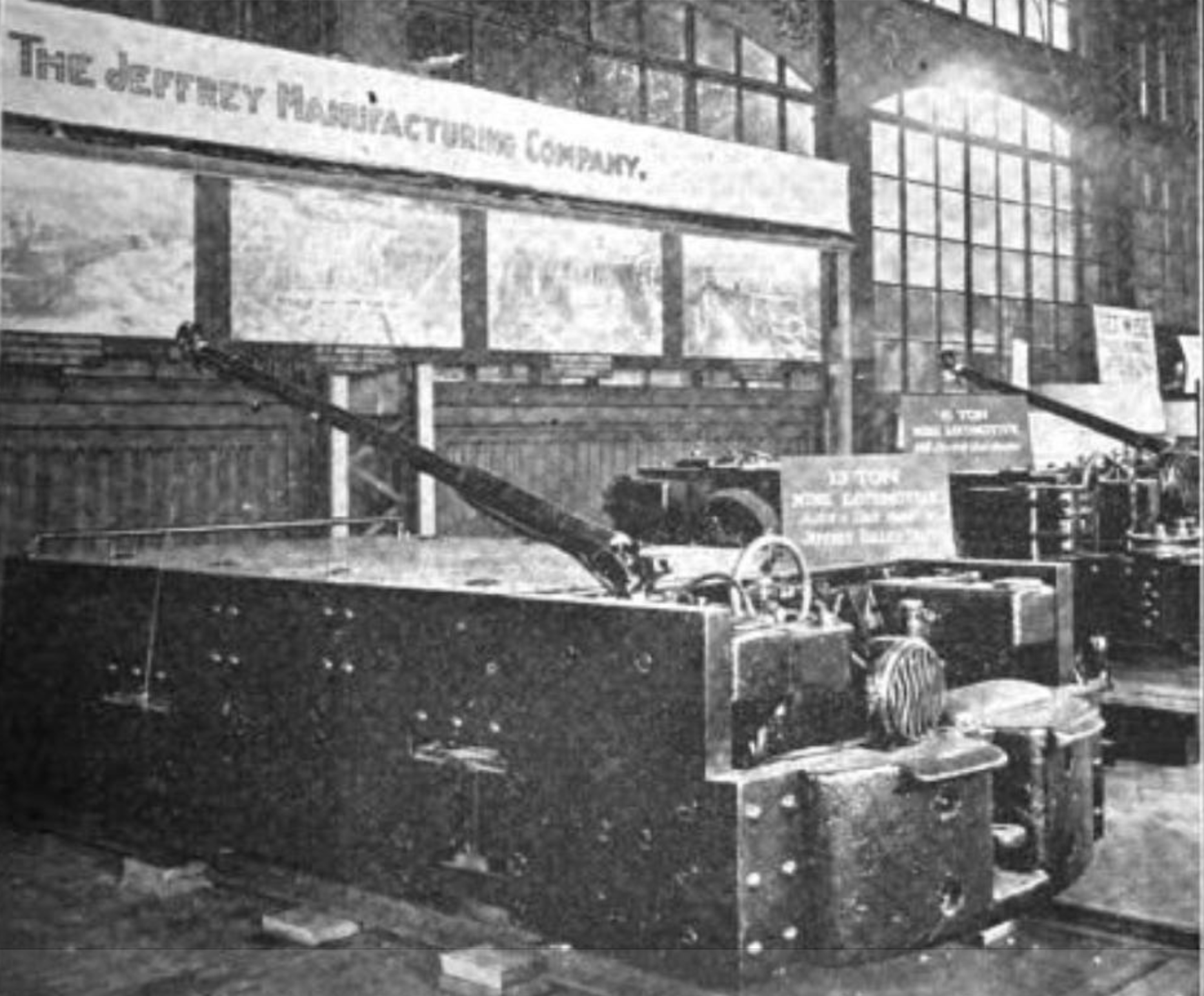
Jeffery Manufacturing Co. electric loco on display at the Pittsburgh Exhibition, 1910
