= Galion Iron Works =

American heavy machinery company

- Industry: Heavy machinery
- Founded: 1907
- Headquarters: Galion, Ohio
- Products: Construction equipment Graders; Rollers

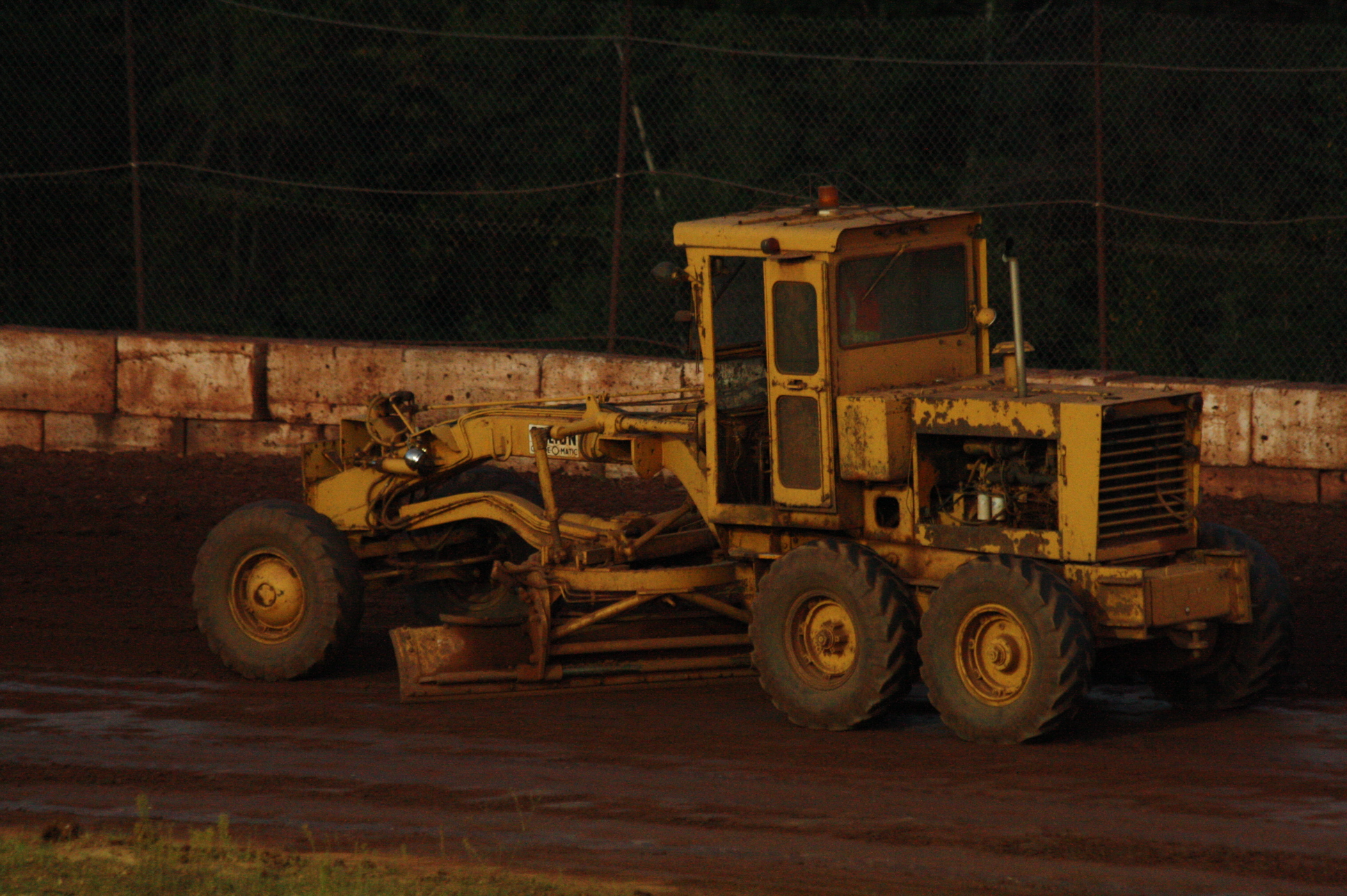
Galion grader

Galion Iron Works is the original name of the company that built the Galion brand of construction equipment. Known for their graders, it also manufactured rollers, cranes, asphalt millers, and even riding squeegees among other machines.

Gallion changed its name to the Galion Manufacturing Company in 1973. It was acquired by Dresser Industries in 1974, and ultimately subsumed into a Dresser-Komatsu joint venture in 1988.

== History ==
The Galion Iron Works Company of Galion, Ohio, was founded by David Charles Boyd and his three brothers in 1907. In its early years, Galion produced a wide range of road-building and other construction equipment including drag scrapers, plows, wagons, stone unloaders, rock crushers, and a variety of other "experimental machines". By 1911, Galion began the production of light-duty horse-drawn road graders. The company's success and product diversification brought about its reorganization in 1923, and a name change to Galion Iron Works and Manufacturing Company. The "Light Premier" was an early grader produced in 1915. It was billed as light enough for two horses, but strong enough for four. Its blade could be raised, lowered, angled, tilted, and shifted sideways, just like the blade movements on a modern grader.

Galion was known for its huge pull-type graders, some of the largest ever built, designed to be pulled behind the largest tractors. The No 14 shown here is equipped with scarifier, steerable tongue, 14-foot blade and hand-operated controls. This heavy-duty unit weighed 15,000 pounds.

Galion was known for building some of the largest pull-type graders in the industry. Popular throughout the 1920s and 1930s, the huge machines were pulled by the largest traction engines and crawler tractors. The graders outperformed other motor graders of the day. Galion continued selling its pull-type graders until 1945, long after other manufacturers discontinued them.

Galion developed one of the first hydraulic power grader systems in the 1920s. By the early 1930s hydraulics were standard on all motor graders. An example of a 1922 "Galion Patrol" is shown here.

In 1922, Galion was one of the first to develop a self-propelled motor grader. The tractor engine and transmission were located in the rear of the frame, and the operator cockpit was located near the center of the machine. Also in the 1920s, development began on one of Galion's greatest achievements- the Galion hydraulic control. Used on both pull-type and self-propelled graders, the hydraulic system was one of the first to be applied to grader controls. In 1929, Jeffrey Manufacturing Company of Columbus, Ohio, purchased the Galion Organization, but the name of the company remained unchanged.

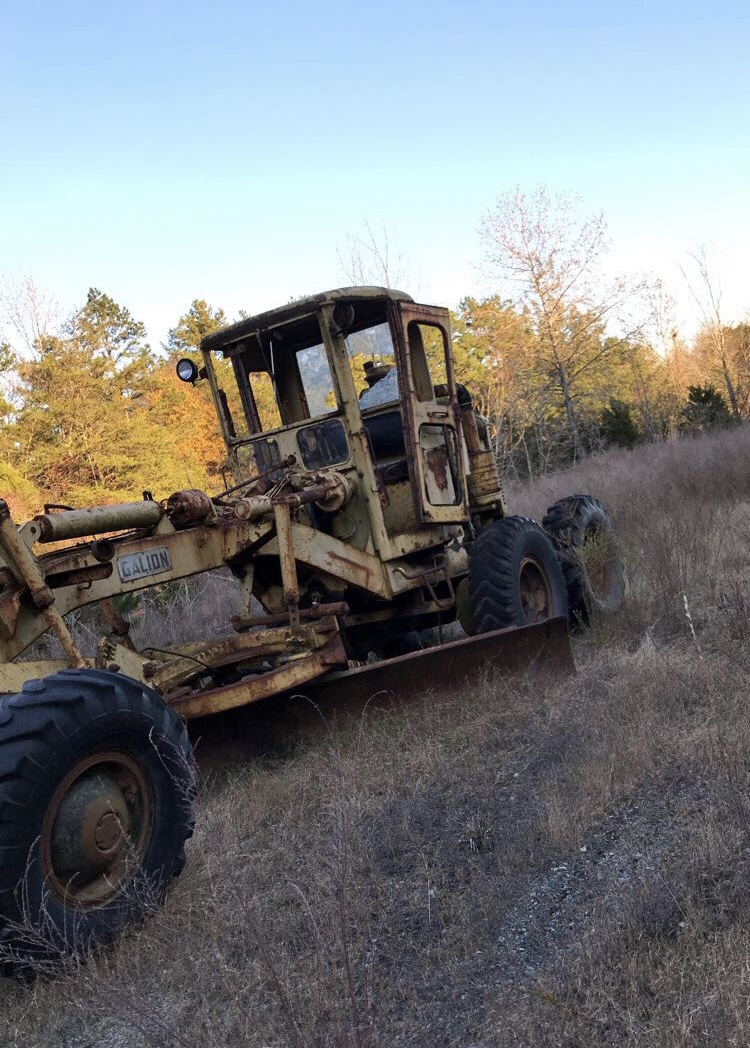
Early 70s Galion Model 118, abandoned in a North Carolina clay mine

The motor grader line received the first power-shift transmission, which was a major advance, in 1955. Called the Galion Grade-O-Matic drive, it utilized a torque converter, output shaft governor and power-shift transmission, providing simple two-lever control of speed and direction. The Galion T-700 garnered the world's largest grader title in 1955. Larger than anything else in the grader industry, it had 190 horsepower (140 kW) and weighed over 40,000 pounds. The graders and rollers built by the Galion Iron Works Company created many of the roads and highways (including the Interstate Highway System) in North America, as well as South America and other countries. After 60 years with the same name, the Galion Iron Works and Manufacturing Company was renamed the Galion Manufacturing Company in 1973. In 1974, a transaction was completed making Galion a division of Dresser Industries, Inc.

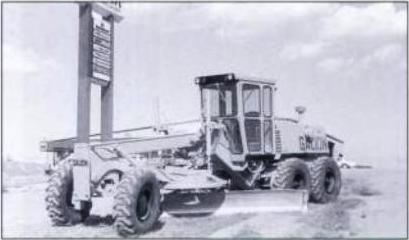
In 1979, Galion added the first three articulated graders to its line. The mid-sized A-550, with a 29,100 pound operating weight, is in the photograph. The graders were of a completely new design, with a distinctive sloping engine hood. Other models of the same design were introduced until all of Galion's rigid-frame machines were replaced by the mid-1980s.

Galion introduced its modern-looking articulated grader line in 1979. It featured a distinctively sloped rear engine hood and was identified as the A-series for "Articulated". Initially three models were introduced, the A-500, A-550, and A-600, weighing up to 30,000 pounds. The models joined the rigid-frame models, which continued in the Galion line until the mid-1980s.

A Dresser 830 grader is shown grading a bank. The 27,800-pound grader was formerly the Galion A-450E, but was renumbered when its parent company Dresser Industries temporarily dropped the Galion name in 1986.

In 1986, the grader products took on the name of the parent company, Dresser, and the Galion name was temporarily dropped. In 1988, the grader line was consolidated into three articulated models named the 830, 850 and 870. Also in 1988, Galion became part of the Komatsu Dresser Company (KDC) joint venture. The Galion name reemerged in 1992, when the Galion division of KDC was established. From 1995, the three basic Galion graders were badged and renumbered to fit into Komatsu's GD series, and featured modified specifications. The Komatsu-designed GD825A-2 is its largest grader, weighing 58,250 pounds and producing 280 horsepower (210 kW).
