= Grader =

Construction machine

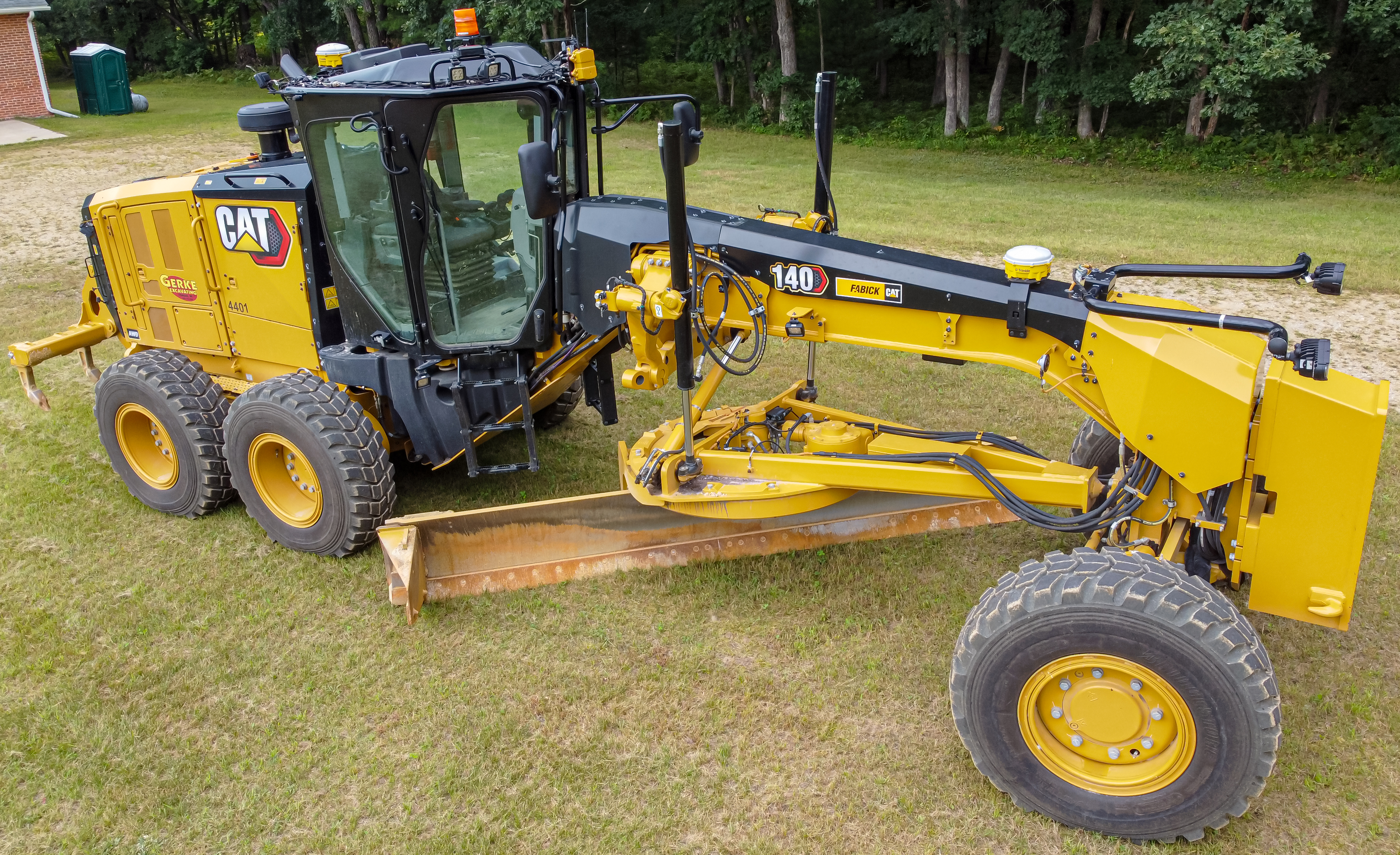
Caterpillar 140 grader

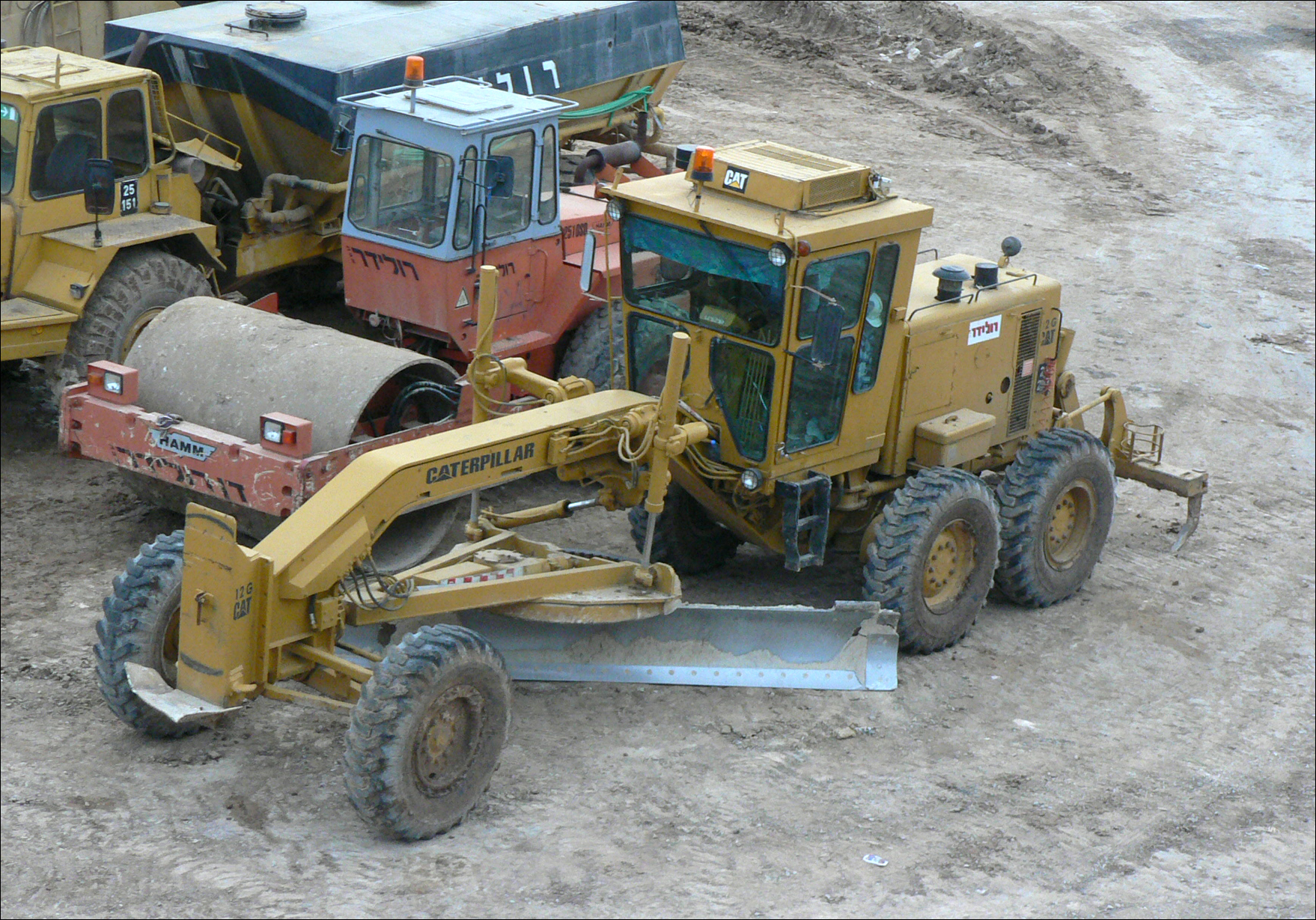
Caterpillar CAT 12G grader

A grader, also commonly referred to as a road grader, motor grader, or simply blade, is a form of heavy equipment with a long blade used to create a flat surface during grading. Although the earliest models were towed behind horses, and later tractors, most modern graders are self-propelled and thus technically "motor graders".

Typical graders have three axles, with the steering wheels in front, followed by the grading blade or mouldboard, then a cab and engine atop tandem rear axles. Some graders also have front-wheel drives for improved performance. Some graders have optional rear attachments, such as a ripper, scarifier, or compactor. A blade forward of the front axle may also be added. For snowplowing and some dirt grading operations, a main blade extension can also be mounted.

Capacities range from a blade width of 2.5 to 7.5 m (8 to 24 ft) and engines from 95–375 kW (125–500 hp). Certain graders can operate multiple attachments, or be designed for specialized tasks like underground mining.

== Function ==
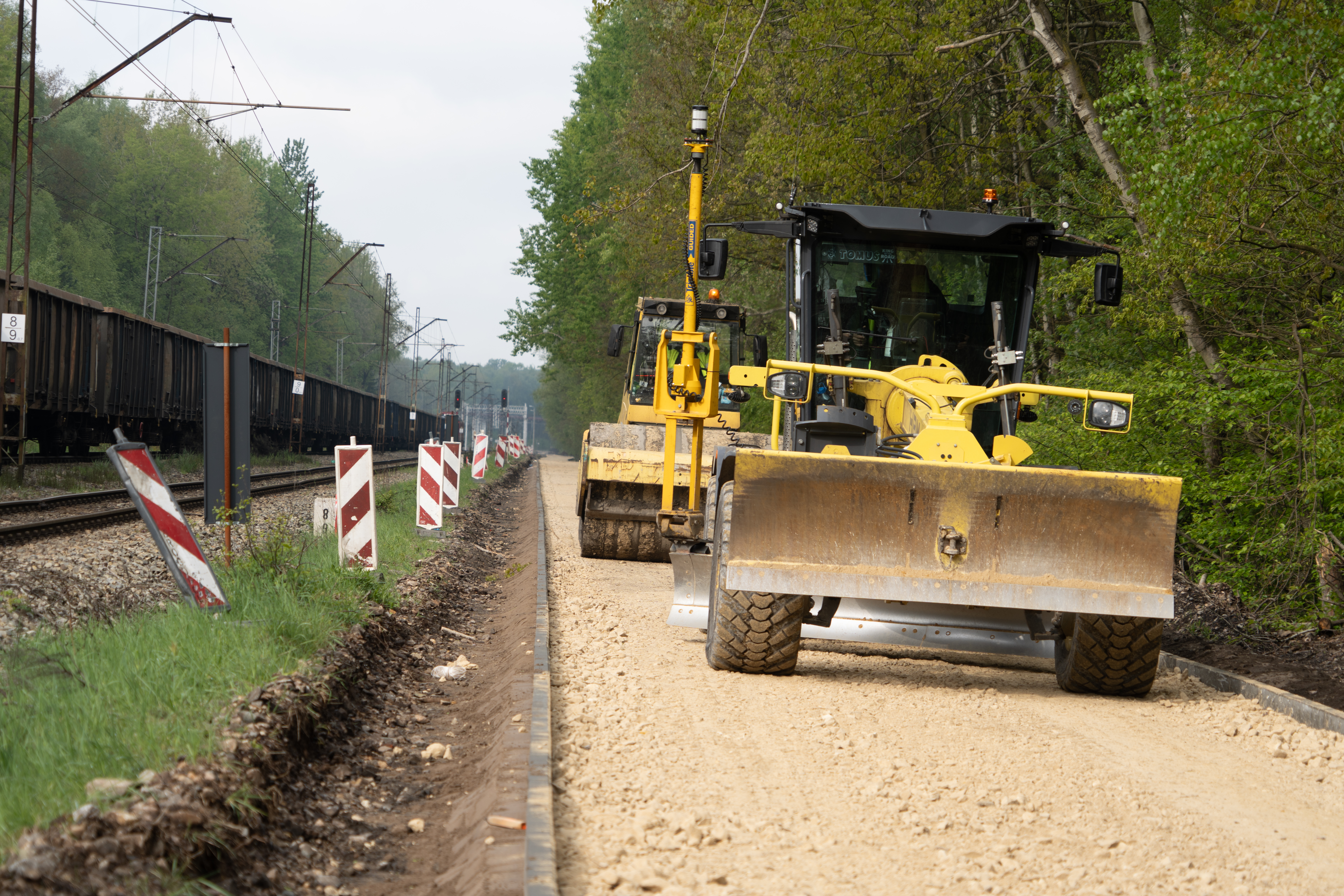
Grader at work

In civil engineering "rough grading" is performed by heavy equipment such as wheel tractor-scrapers and bulldozers. Graders are used to "finish grade", with the angle, tilt (or pitch), and height of their blade capable of being adjusted to a high level of precision.

Graders are commonly used in the construction and maintenance of dirt and gravel roads. In constructing paved roads, they prepare a wide flat base course for the final road surface. Graders are also used to set native soil or gravel foundation pads to finish grade before the construction of large buildings. Graders can produce canted surfaces for drainage or safety. They may be used to produce drainage ditches with shallow V-shaped cross-sections on either side of highways.

Steering is performed via a steering wheel, or a joystick capable of controlling both the angle and cant of the front wheels. Many models also allow frame articulation between the front and rear axles, which allows a smaller turning radius in addition to allowing the operator to adjust the articulation angle to aid in the efficiency of moving material. Other implement functions are typically hydraulically powered and can be directly controlled by levers, or by joystick inputs or electronic switches controlling electrohydraulic servo valves.

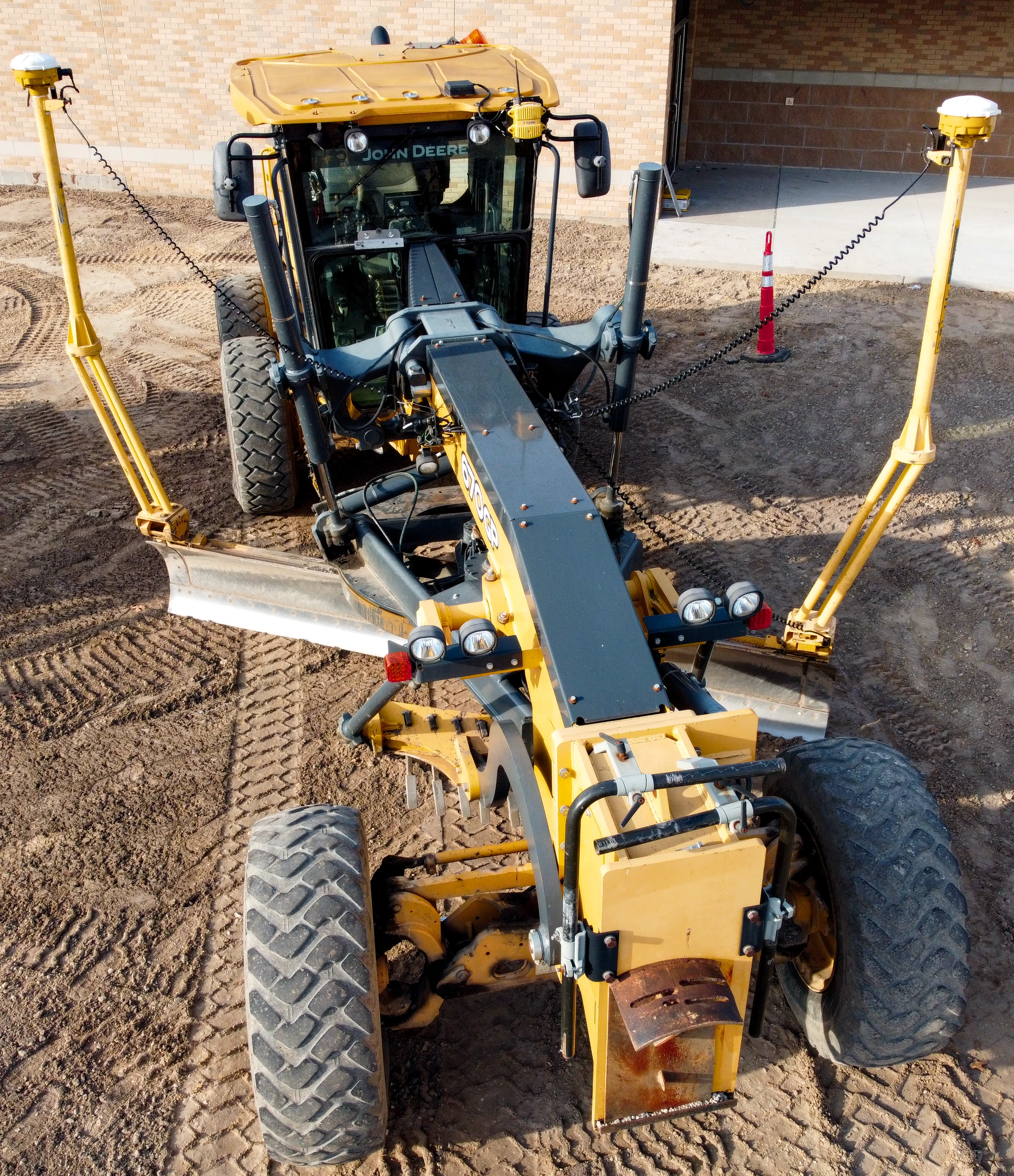
Grader GPS antennas

Graders are also outfitted with modern digital grade control technologies, such as those manufactured by Topcon Positioning Systems, Inc., Trimble Navigation, Leica Geosystems, or Mikrofyn. These may combine both laser and GPS guidance to establish precise grade control and (potentially) "stateless" construction. Manufacturers such as John Deere have also begun to integrate these technologies during construction.

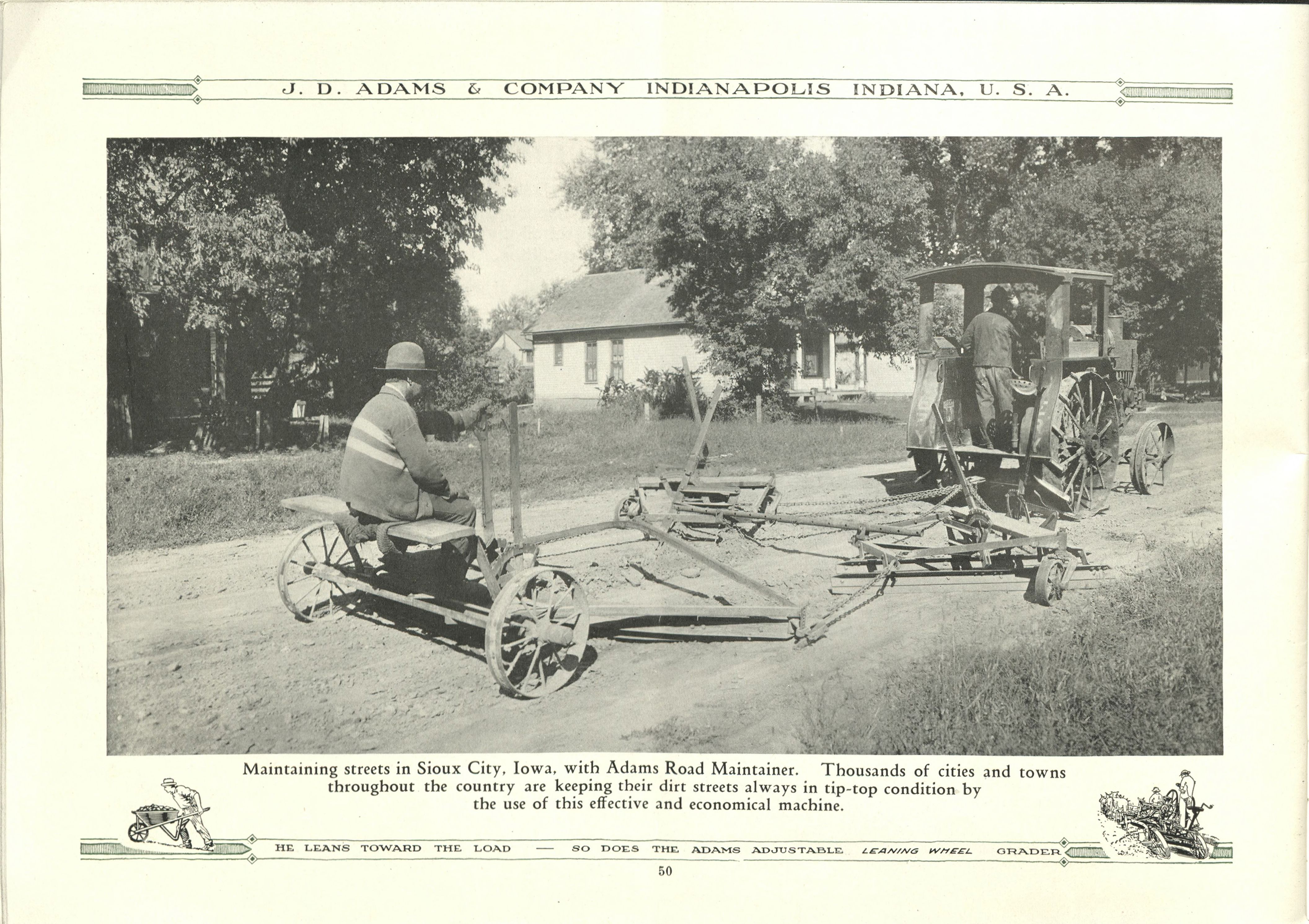
1910 Ad for an Adams Road Maintainer from J.A. Adams Company

== History ==
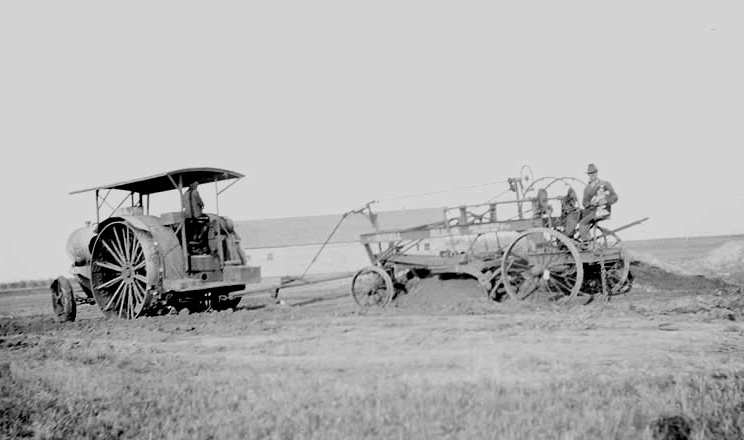
1918 grader

Early graders were drawn by humans and draft animals. The Fresno Scraper is a machine pulled by horses used for constructing canals and ditches in sandy soil. The design of the Fresno Scraper forms the basis of most modern earthmoving scrapers, having the ability to scrape and move a quantity of soil, and also to discharge it at a controlled depth, thus quadrupling the volume which could be handled manually. The Fresno scraper was invented in 1883 by James Porteous. Working with farmers in Fresno, California, he had recognised the dependence of the Central San Joaquin Valley on irrigation, and the need for a more efficient means of constructing canals and ditches in the sandy soil. In perfecting the design of his machine, Porteous made several revisions on his own and also traded ideas with William Deidrick, Frank Dusy, and Abijah McCall, who invented and held patents on similar scrapers.

The era of motorization by traction engines, steam tractors, motor trucks, and tractors saw such towed graders grow in size and productivity. The first self-propelled grader was made in 1920 by the Russell Grader Manufacturing Company, which called it the Russell Motor Hi-Way Patrol. These early graders were created by adding the grader blade as an attachment to a generalist tractor unit. After purchasing the company in 1928, Caterpillar went on to truly integrate the tractor and grader into one design—at the same time replacing crawler tracks with wheels to yield the first rubber-tire self-propelled grader, the Caterpillar Auto Patrol, released in 1931.

== Regional uses ==
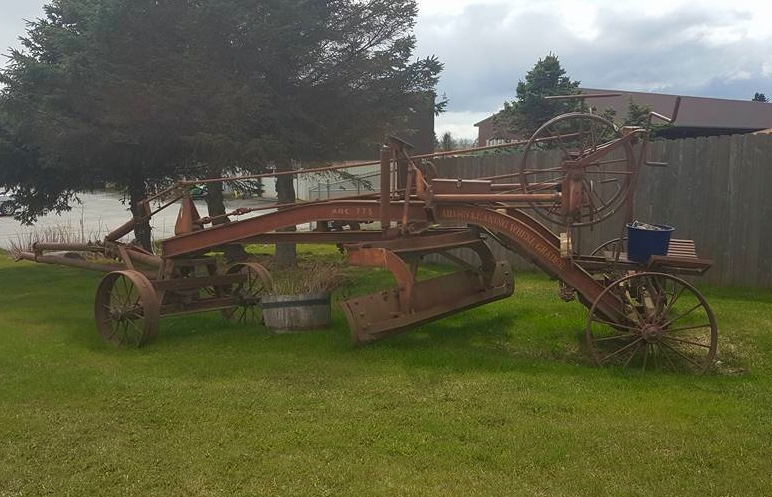
Antique Adams leaning wheel road grader on display outside of Homer Public Works building, Homer, Alaska

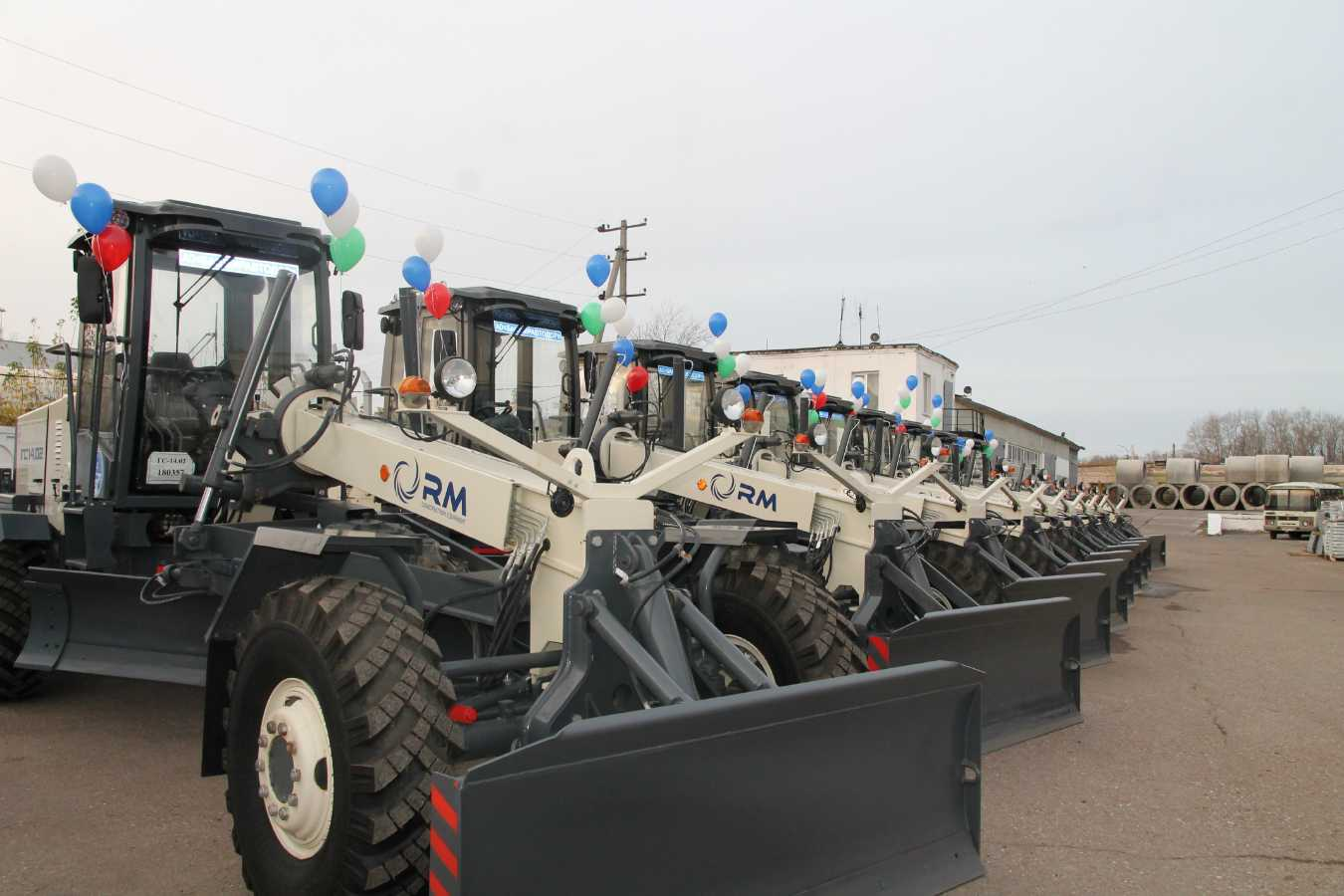
Motor grader GS-14.02

In addition to their use in road construction, graders may also be used to perform roughly equivalent work.

In some locales such as Northern Europe, Canada, and places in the United States, graders are often used in municipal and residential snow removal. In scrubland and grassland areas of Australia and Africa, graders are often an essential piece of equipment on ranches, large farms, and plantations to make dirt tracks where the absence of rocks and trees means bulldozers are not required. In New Zealand, both tractor and horse drawn machines were called scoops and they were also used for railway building.

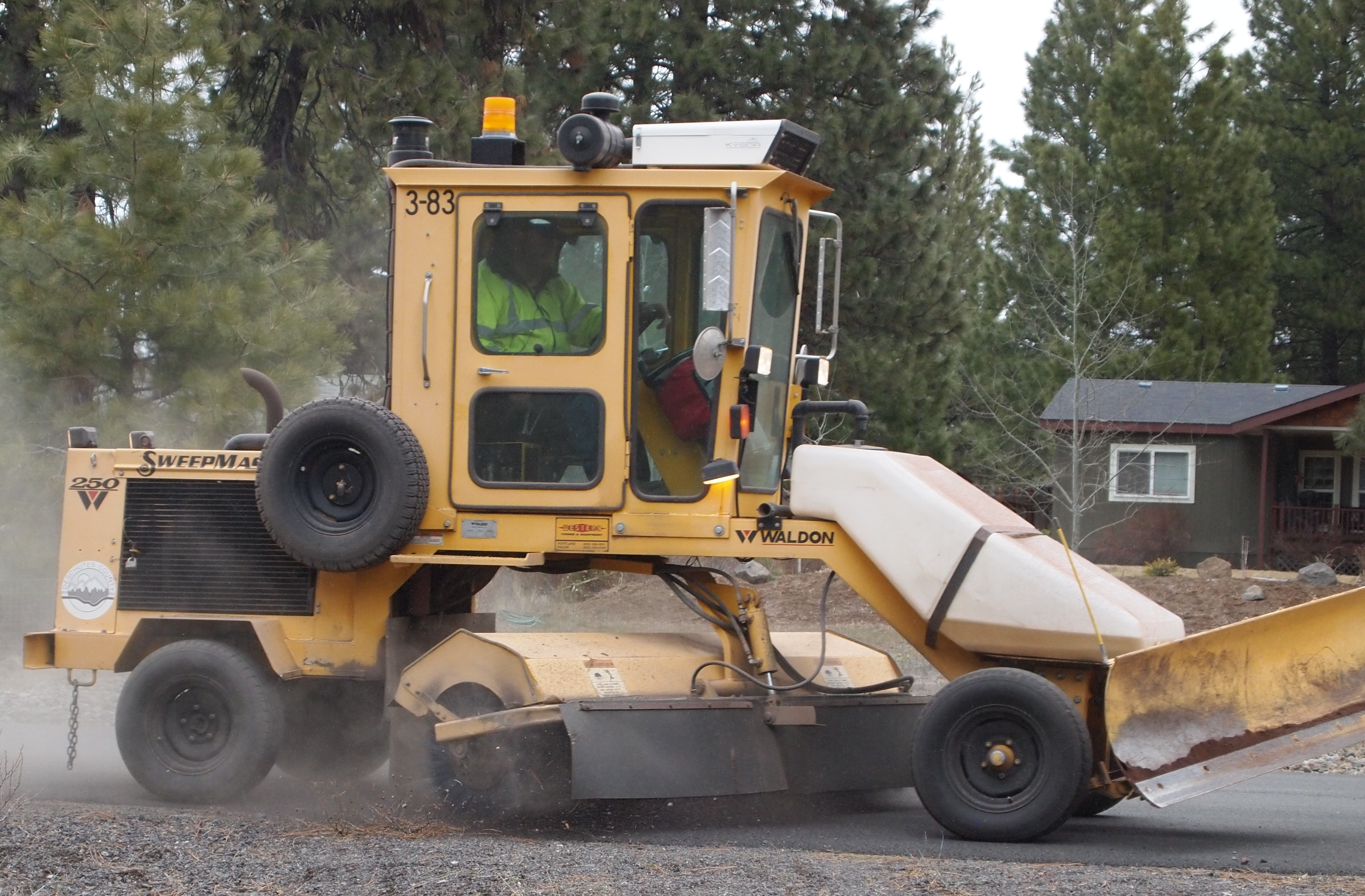
Grader-style vehicle using a sweeper attachment

== Manufacturers ==
- Case Construction Equipment
- Caterpillar Inc.
- Deere & Company
- Galion Iron Works
- HEPCO
- Komatsu Limited
- LiuGong Construction Machinery, LLC.
- Mitsubishi Heavy Industries
- New Holland Construction
- Sany
- SDLG
- Terex Corporation
- Volvo
- XCMG
- Hidromek

== See also ==
- King road drag
- Land grading
