= Kilbourne and Jacobs Manufacturing Co. =

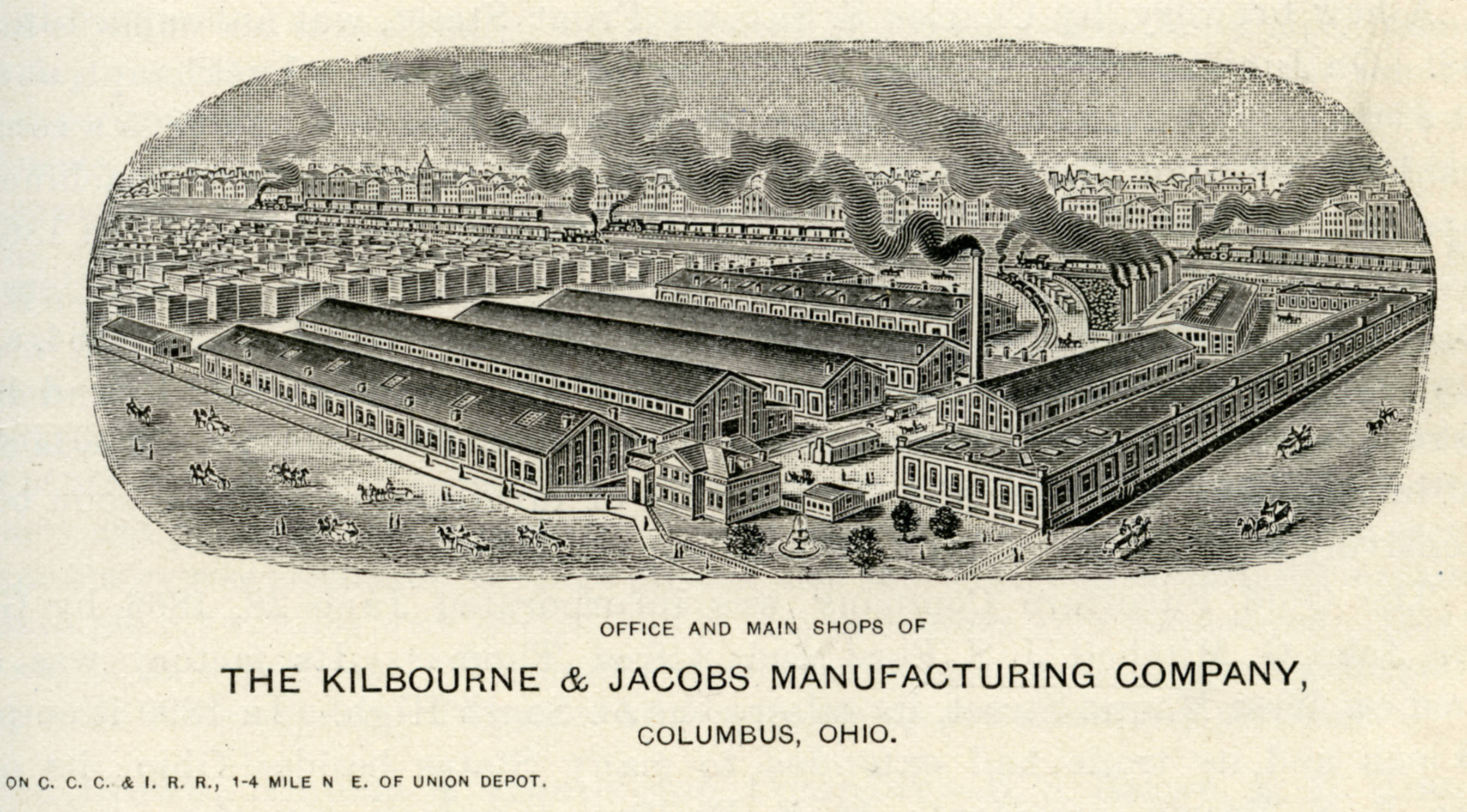
- The Kilbourne and Jacobs Manufacturing Co. in 1892
- Industry: Manufacturing
- Founded: 1881
- Founder: James Kilbourne and HL Jacobs
- Defunct: 1923
- Headquarters: Columbus, Ohio

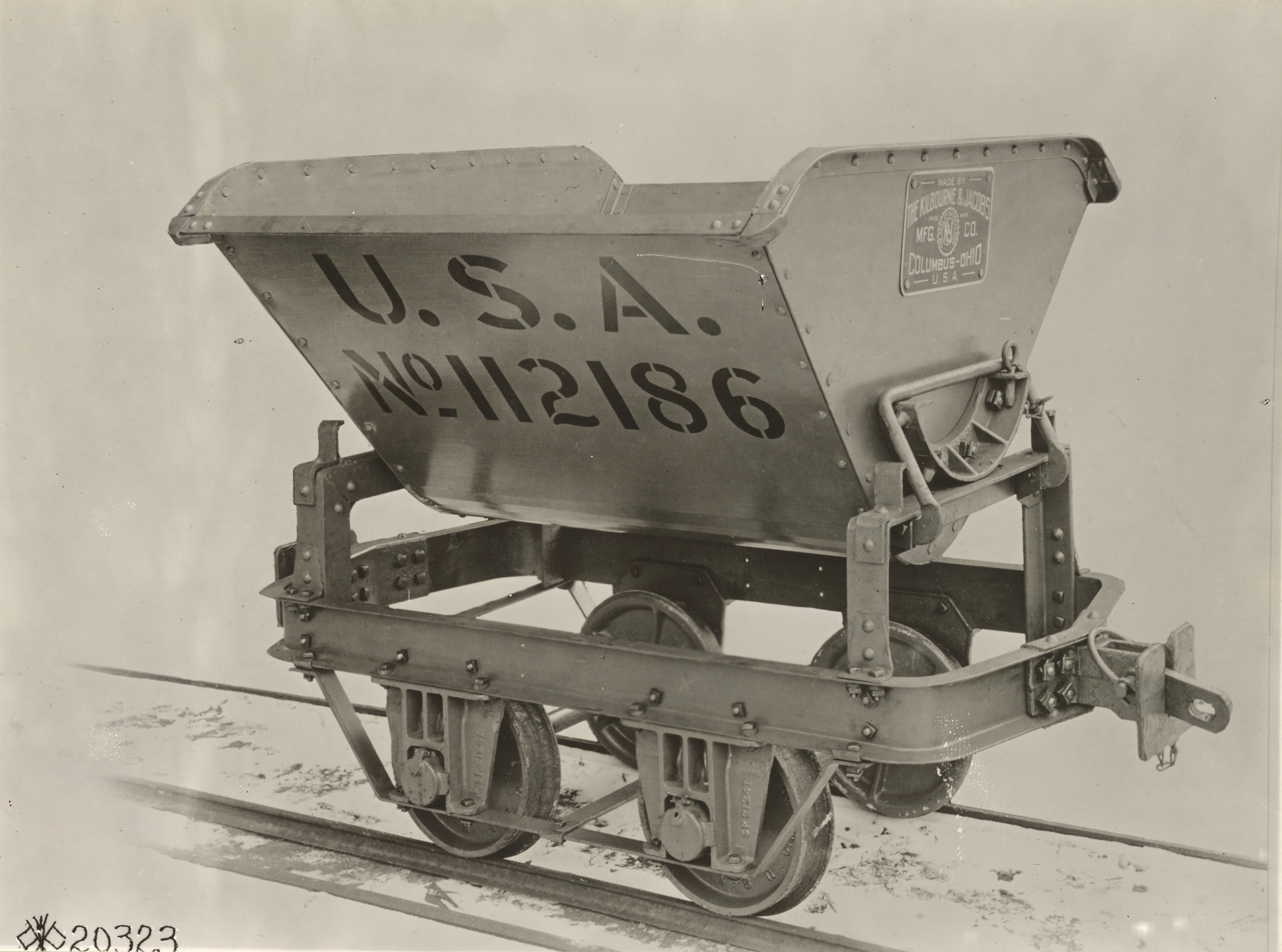
V skip wagon built for US Army in 1917.

Kilbourne and Jacobs Manufacturing Company was founded in 1881 by James Kilbourne and HL Jacobs in Columbus, Ohio with an initial investment of $100,000. Built near Union Station, the company produced wheelbarrows, horse-drawn railroad scrapers and other earth-moving equipment during the turn of the century. Several years after opening, the company developed a line of hand trucks, forty percent of which were sold to the New York Central Railroad. By the end of the 19th century, Kilbourne and Jacobs was the largest manufacturer of earth-moving equipment in the United States. The Ohio State Journal reported in 1890 that the company produced approximately 150,000 hand trucks per year with between 400-600 workers, pushing annual sales to nearly $1 million.

The company went bankrupt in 1923 and was acquired by the Jeffrey Manufacturing Company.
