= Berry Brothers Bolt Works =

Archaeological site in Ohio, United States

- U.S. National Register of Historic Places
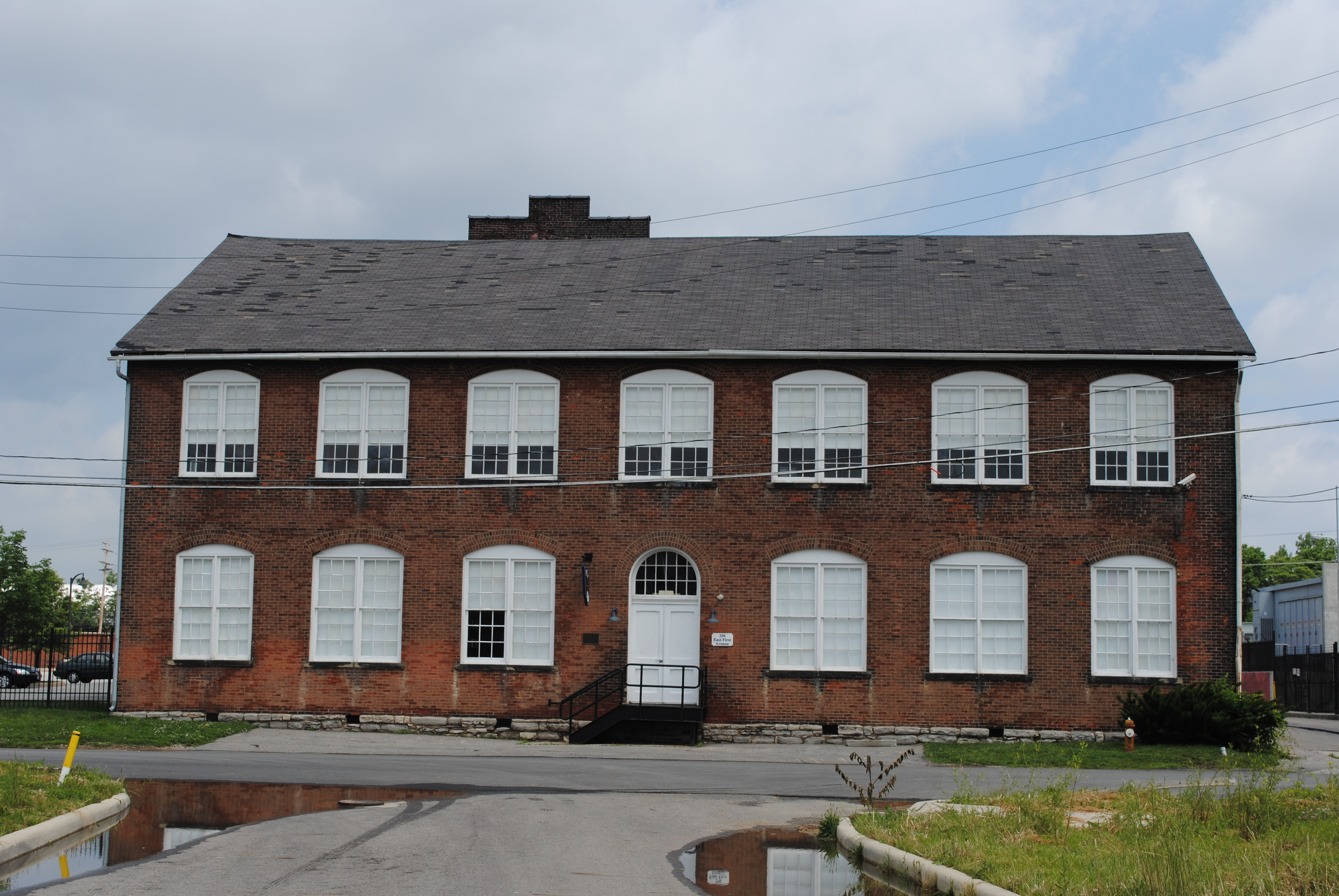
- Southern end of the factory
- Interactive map highlighting the building's location
- Location: 350 E. First Ave., Columbus, Ohio
- Coordinates: 39.981028°N 82.994668°W
- Area: 1.5 acres (0.61 ha)
- Built: 1888
- Architectural style: Late Victorian
- NRHP reference No.: 88000051
- Added to NRHP: February 19, 1988

The Berry Brothers Bolt Works is a former factory in Columbus, Ohio, United States. For more than a century after its 1888 construction, the factory produced machine tools using original equipment. The structure itself is one of Columbus' most prominent factory buildings, and it was named a historic site in its centennial year.

Berry Brothers is a brick building with an asphalt roof, set on a foundation of limestone. Numerous windows, many set in pairs, cover the three-story facade of the main and secondary sections of the building. The building is typical of period factories, due to major components such as the brick walls and gabled roof, and also because of smaller elements such as the wooden windows with numerous small panes of glass, a four-story tower with staircase, and clerestory.

Near the end of the nineteenth century, Columbus possessed numerous factories that built buggies and various machine tools, and the Berry Brothers constructed their manufacturing plant in 1888 for the sole purpose of producing bolts for these factories. A competing firm, built at the same time, went out of business before Berry Brothers. Their business, on the other hand, prospered; the building was greatly expanded in 1900, and a second large addition was erected ten years later. As buggies were replaced by cars, Berry Brothers continued in operation, using its 1880s equipment into the 1980s. No longer a factory, the company's building was purchased in 2000 with the goal of renovation, although financial problems delayed the start of work until 2004.

In early 1988, the bolt factory was listed on the National Register of Historic Places, qualifying on three of the Register's four listing criteria: because of its architecture, because of its place in local history, and because of its potential to be an industrial archaeological site. The only criterion under which it did not qualify was that of association with a prominent individual.

== See also ==
- National Register of Historic Places listings in Columbus, Ohio
