= Old North Cemetery =

Old North Cemetery may refer to a location in the United States:

- North Graveyard, also known as the Old North Cemetery, in Columbus, Ohio
- Old North Cemetery (Hartford, Connecticut), listed on the National Register of Historic Places (NRHP) in Hartford County
- Old North Cemetery (Truro, Massachusetts), listed on the NRHP in Barnstable County
- Old North Cemetery (Concord, New Hampshire), listed on the NRHP in Merrimack County
- Old North Cemetery (Portsmouth, New Hampshire), listed on the NRHP in Rockingham County

== See also ==
- Old Cemetery (disambiguation)
- North Cemetery (disambiguation)
- Old North (disambiguation)
- Cemetery (disambiguation)
