= Merchant Building =

Building in Ohio, United States

- May 2022 rendering of the completed tower beside North Market
- Interactive map of the Merchant Building area

General information
- Status: Under construction
- Location: Columbus, Ohio
- Coordinates: 39.971867°N 83.003848°W
- Groundbreaking: 2022
- Estimated completion: 2026

Technical details
- Floor count: 32
- Grounds: 1 acre (0.40 ha)

Design and construction
- Architecture firm: Schooley Caldwell, NBBJ

Website
- www.merchantbuildingoffice.com

The Merchant Building is a 32-story skyscraper under construction in Downtown Columbus, Ohio. The project formally began in 2016 when the city solicited design ideas; it selected a winning proposal in 2017. Construction began in 2023.

The building will be a mixed-use development with a hotel, residential units, office space, a restaurant, bar, private club, and space for an expansion of North Market.

== Attributes ==
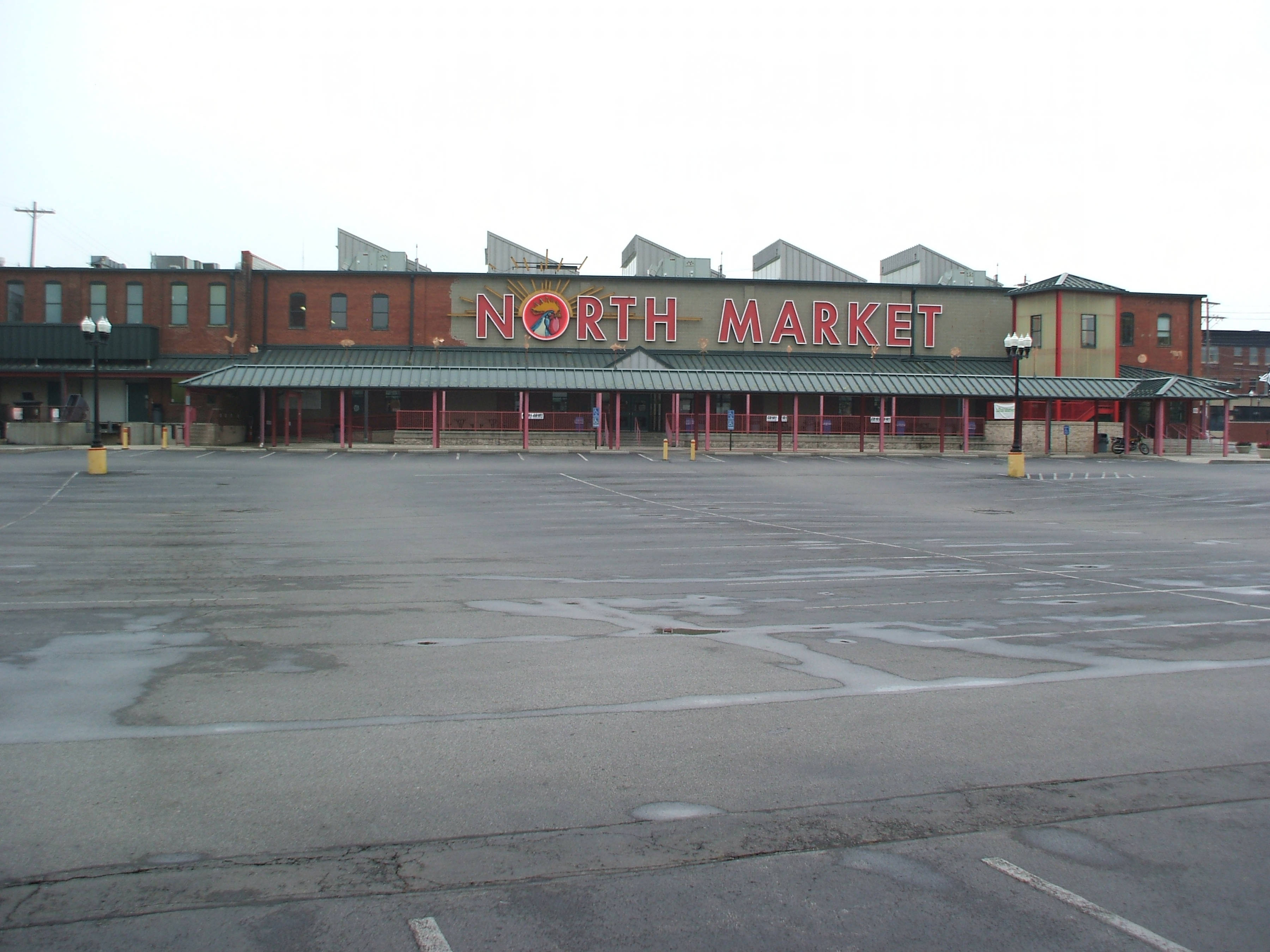
The building will replace a surface lot used by North Market

The one-acre (0.40 ha) site is in the North Market Historic District, and is the historical site of North Market, the city's oldest surviving marketplace. The market currently occupies an adjacent building, with the project site utilized as a 130-space surface parking lot.

The 32-story building will be a $292 million, 700,000-square-foot (65,000 m^{2}) mixed-use development. It will include 174 residential units, event space, and 65,000 square feet (6,000 m^{2}) of office space. Public spaces will include a cafe, retail spaces, a barber shop, 11,000 square feet (1,000 m^{2}) for North Market, and 350 parking spaces. The building's hotel, the Merchant Hotel, will have 162 guest rooms, the Trade Room and Bar, a courtyard, and restaurants.

The building will also include a private social club, the Merchant Club, for people interested in wellness, arts, culture, and the club's programming. It will include 44 guest rooms with their own experience, along with a library bar, rooftop bar, and rooftop pool.

The land is owned by the City of Columbus, which intends to transfer ownership to the developers at no cost. The development will pay the market to make up for the loss of its parking lot for every year in perpetuity, in a move that the city approves as directing funds directly into the market as opposed to the government.

The market has been adorned with a large sign for years, on its east side. The sign features the market's mascot, "Rudy the Rooster". It was disassembled in 2023, to be moved to the southwest face of the building during the Merchant Building construction process.

== History ==
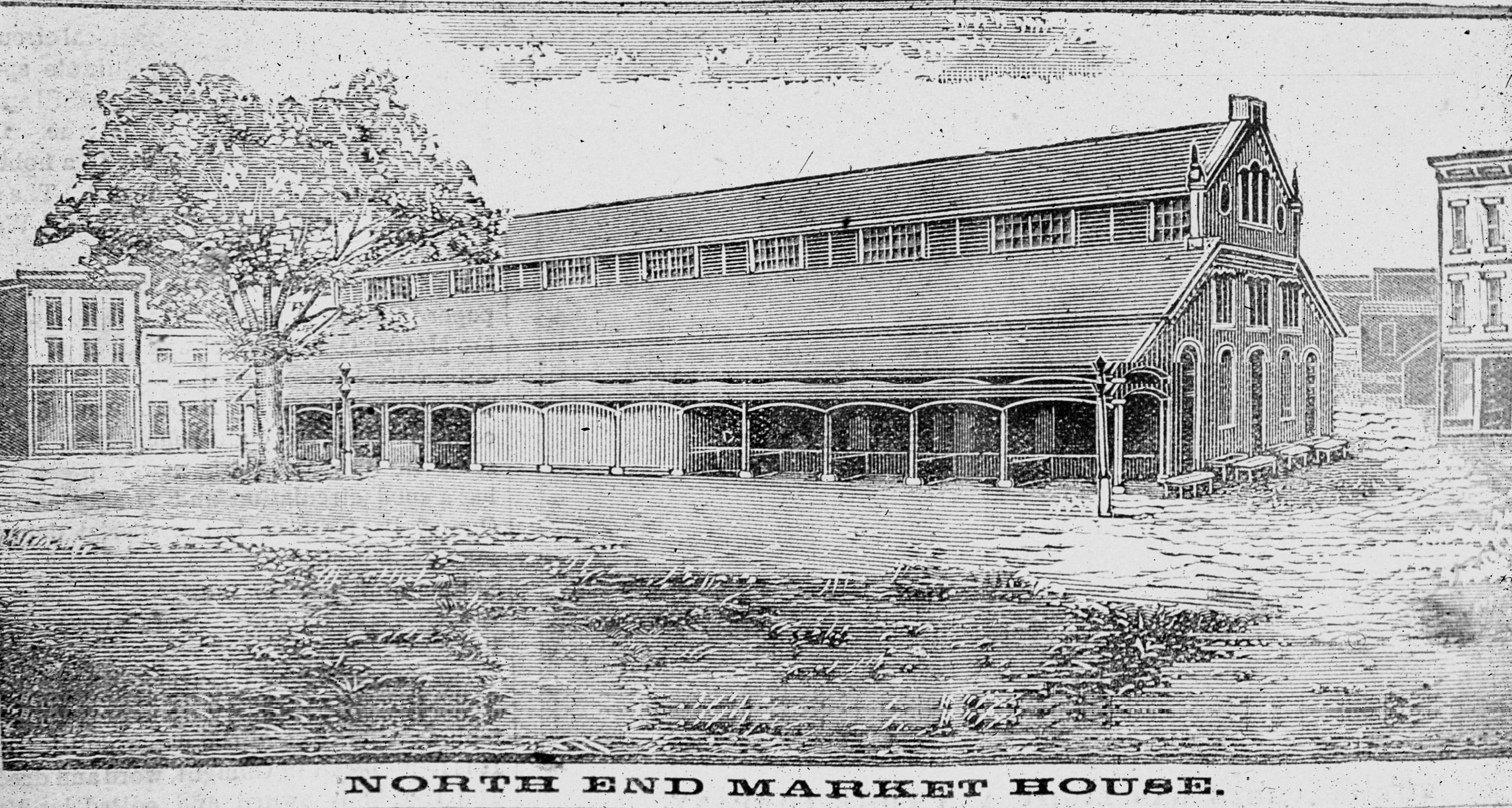
North End Market House (1876-1948)

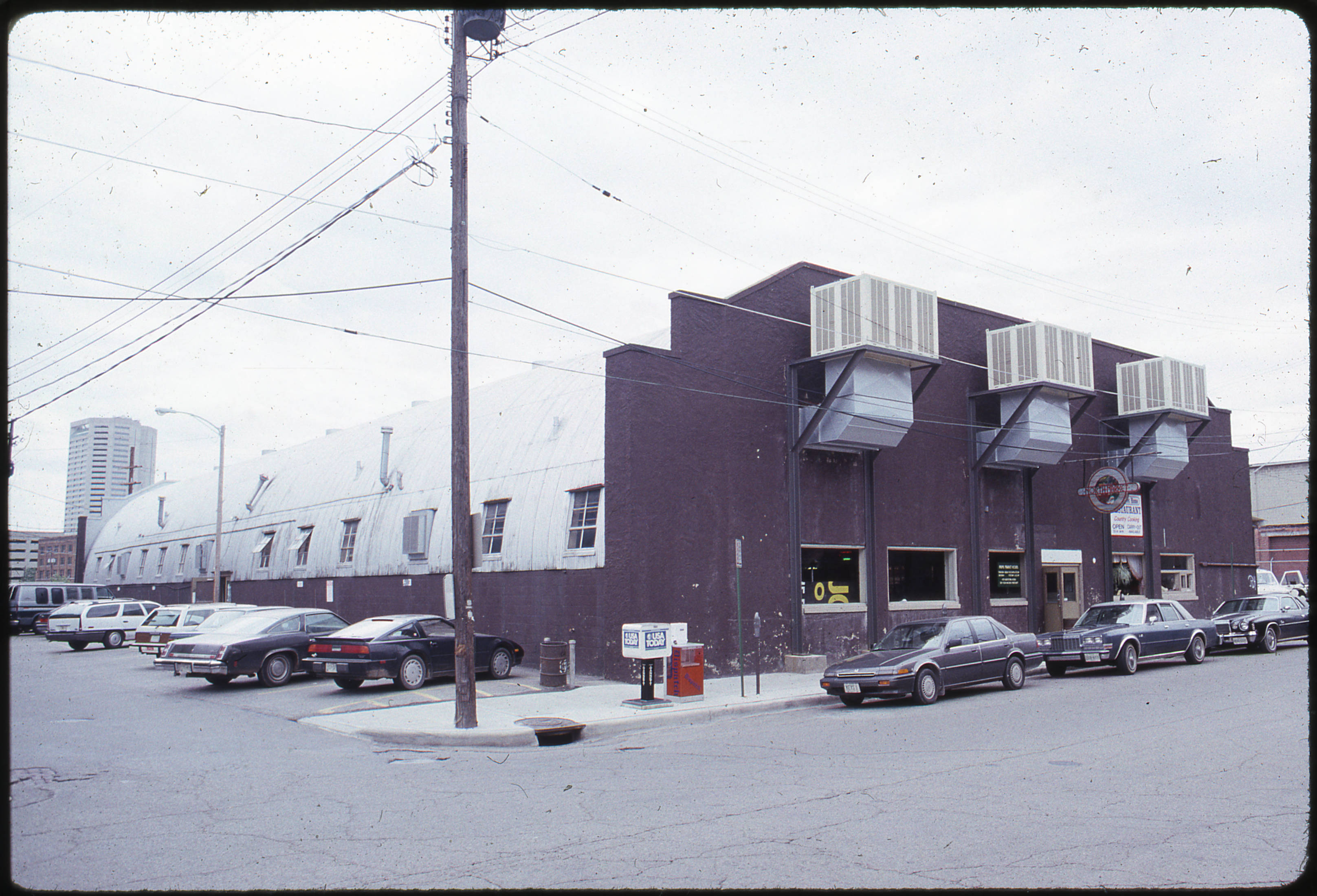
The second North Market (1948-1995)

The site is in the North Market Historic District, and is the historical site of the first two buildings that housed North Market, the city's oldest surviving marketplace. The market currently occupies an adjacent building, with the project site utilized as a 130-space surface parking lot. The land for the market and parking lot were acquired by the city in 1992.

In 2013, North Market's director floated ideas about redeveloping the market's parking lot, which led developers to approach market officials with ideas. The process to redevelop the space was first announced in September 2016, when the city held an architectural design contest to find a developer for the space. Seven teams of developers presented ideas; the winning proposal, "Market Tower" by Wood Companies and Schiff Capital Group, was chosen in April 2017, over designs by the Pizzuti Companies, Nationwide Realty Investors, Kaufman Development, Flaherty & Collins, Casto, and Lifestyle Communities.

The winning design was initially proposed to have 35 stories, with a square floorplan and an exterior predominantly made of tall glass panels. Parking would be both underground and inside the building, in an area with potential to convert to office space. Schooley Caldwell was listed as the architect for the project, and later added NBBJ to assist in the design. At the time the winning project was announced, it was proposed for construction to take place from 2018 to 2020 at a cost of $120 million.

In July 2019, the project was renamed the "North Market Mixed-Use Project", the tower's height was reduced to 26-28 stories, with an added hotel, and a total cost of $192 million. In September 2019, City Council approved an economic development agreement for the site and the project began review by the Columbus Downtown Commission and Historic Resources Commission. In September 2021, changes were made to the project, including increasing the number of floors to 31, making it potentially the tallest building constructed in the city since 1990. It was approved by the Downtown Commission in December 2021.

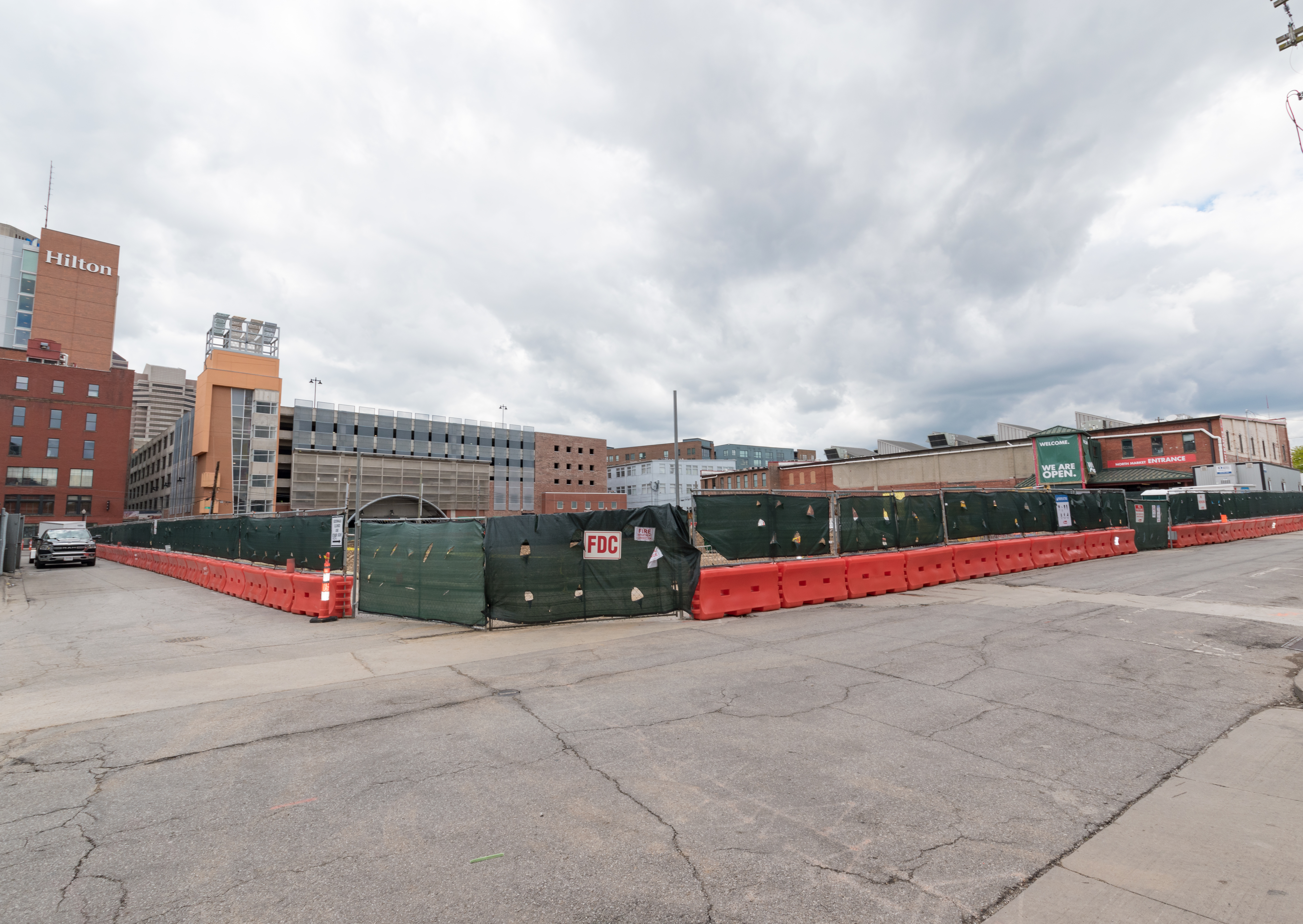
The building worksite in April 2023

In May 2022, the structure was renamed "the Merchant Building", after the goods and produce merchants that have utilized North Market. Construction began in 2023 with an estimated completion date of 2026.

In February 2023, as expected, archaeologists discovered the buried remains of 40 people in the site, there was actually over 850 graves found and roughly 1/5 had a full skeletal remain. A number of the graves had multiple remains and nearly all that did not a full skeleton had fragmented or incomplete remains, there was also a number of child and infant remains found as well. The 1-acre property was part of the 10-acre North Graveyard, one of the original cemeteries created in Columbus. From 1813 to 1864, it was the primary cemetery for Columbus-area residents. A portion was removed in 1872, and the remainder was moved in 1881. All discovered remains will be reburied at Green Lawn Cemetery.

== See also ==
- List of tallest buildings in Columbus, Ohio
