= Pet Sematary (disambiguation) =

Pet Sematary is a 1983 horror novel by Stephen King.

Pet Sematary may also refer to:

- Pet Sematary (1989 film), a horror film based on the Stephen King novel
  - Pet Sematary (soundtrack), Elliot Goldenthal's score to the 1989 film
  - "Pet Sematary" (song), a 1989 single from the Ramones album Brain Drain, originally written for the 1989 film
  - Pet Sematary Two, a 1992 sequel film
- Pet Sematary (2019 film), a horror film based on the Stephen King novel
  - Pet Sematary: Bloodlines, a 2023 prequel film

== See also ==
- Sematary (born 2000 or 2001), American rapper
- Pet cemetery
- Gates of Heaven — 1978 documentary film about a pet cemetery
- "Pet Cemetery", a song by Tierra Whack from Whack World
- Cemetery (disambiguation)
