= North Cemetery =

North Cemetery may refer to:

- Manila North Cemetery, Philippines
- North Cemetery (Leverett, Massachusetts), United States
- North Cemetery (Worthington, Massachusetts), United States
- North Graveyard, also known as the North Cemetery, in Columbus, Ohio

== See also ==
- Old North Cemetery (disambiguation)
