= G. W. Bobb Company Building =

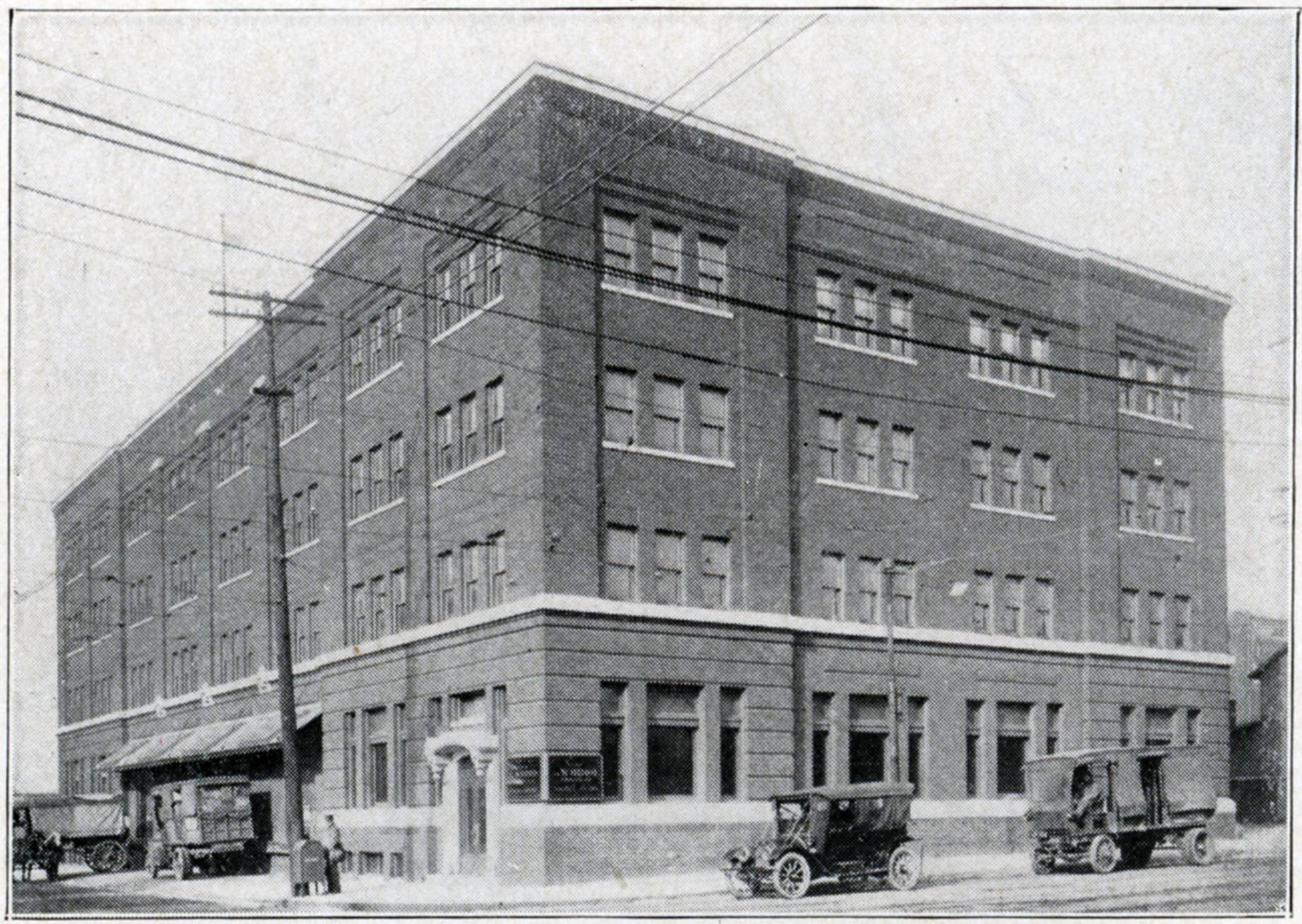
- Interactive map of the G. W. Bobb Company Building area

General information
- Location: 242–260 East Naghten Street
- Coordinates: 39.969°N 82.995°W
- Completed: 1914
- Demolished: June 2023

Website
- Project website

The G. W. Bobb Company Building was a historic building in Downtown Columbus, Ohio. In 2023, the owner of the building announced it would be demolished, including additions to the structure that span an entire downtown city block. The City of Columbus issued an emergency hazard order requiring either demolition or immediate repairs in April 2023, after determining the building had "advanced deterioration." The building was demolished in June 2023.

The original four-story structure dates to 1914, and was built as an ice house, holding blocks of ice for refrigeration. It later was known as the warehouse of the Neilston Warehouse Company and later as part of the Creasy Corporation. The building, at the south end of the block, includes a six-story addition to its north, as well as a two-story structure at the north edge of the block.

George William Bobb, first owner of the building, operated the wholesale grocer George Bobb & Son, later known as George Bobb & Sons and the G. W. Bobb Company. His four-story plant had two elevators, steam heat, and its own private spur track to the railroad, making it considered the most modern building of its kind in the Midwest.
