= Old North =

Old North may refer to:

== Periods ==
- Viking Age Scandinavia
- Old North (Britain) (Hen Ogledd), the Cumbric-speaking areas of northern England and southern Scotland in the Early Middle Ages

== Places ==
- Old North State, traditional nickname for the State of North Carolina, U.S.
- Old North St. Louis, St. Louis, Missouri, U.S.
- Old North Columbus, Columbus, Ohio, U.S.
- Old North, Tel Aviv, a neighborhood in Tel Aviv, Israel
- Old Northwest, historical name for the Territory Northwest of the River Ohio, U.S.

== Structures ==
- Old North Bridge, an American War of Independence site in Concord, Massachusetts, U.S.
- Old North Building, a building of Georgetown University
- Old North Church or Christ Church, a church on Salem Street, Boston, Massachusetts, U.S.
- Second Church, Boston or Old North Church, a church in North Square, Boston, Massachusetts, U.S.
- Old North Road, a Roman road in England
- Old North Tower, University of Central Oklahoma, an educational building in Edmond, Oklahoma, listed on the National Register of Historic Places
- Old North Church (Sierra Madre, California)

== Music ==
- "The Old North State", the official state song of North Carolina

== Other uses ==
- Old North State Council, a local council of the Boy Scouts of America in North Carolina

== See also ==
- Old Nordic (disambiguation)
- Old Norse
- Old North Cemetery (disambiguation)
