= Old Cemetery =

(The) Old Cemetery may refer to:

- Canwick Road Old Cemetery, Lincoln, England
- Milk Row Cemetery, Somerville, Massachusetts, United States
- Old Cemetery (Flensburg), Germany
- Old Cemetery (Freiburg im Breisgau), Germany
- Old Cemetery (Lebanon, Connecticut), United States
- Alter Friedhof, Bonn, Germany
