= Old Nordic =

Old Nordic may refer to:

- Old Norse, a language spoken in Scandinavia from the 9th to the 13th century
- Proto-Norse, a language spoken from the 3rd to the 7th century

== See also ==
- Nordic (disambiguation)
