= Milk Row Cemetery =

Historic cemetery in Massachusetts, US

- U.S. National Register of Historic Places
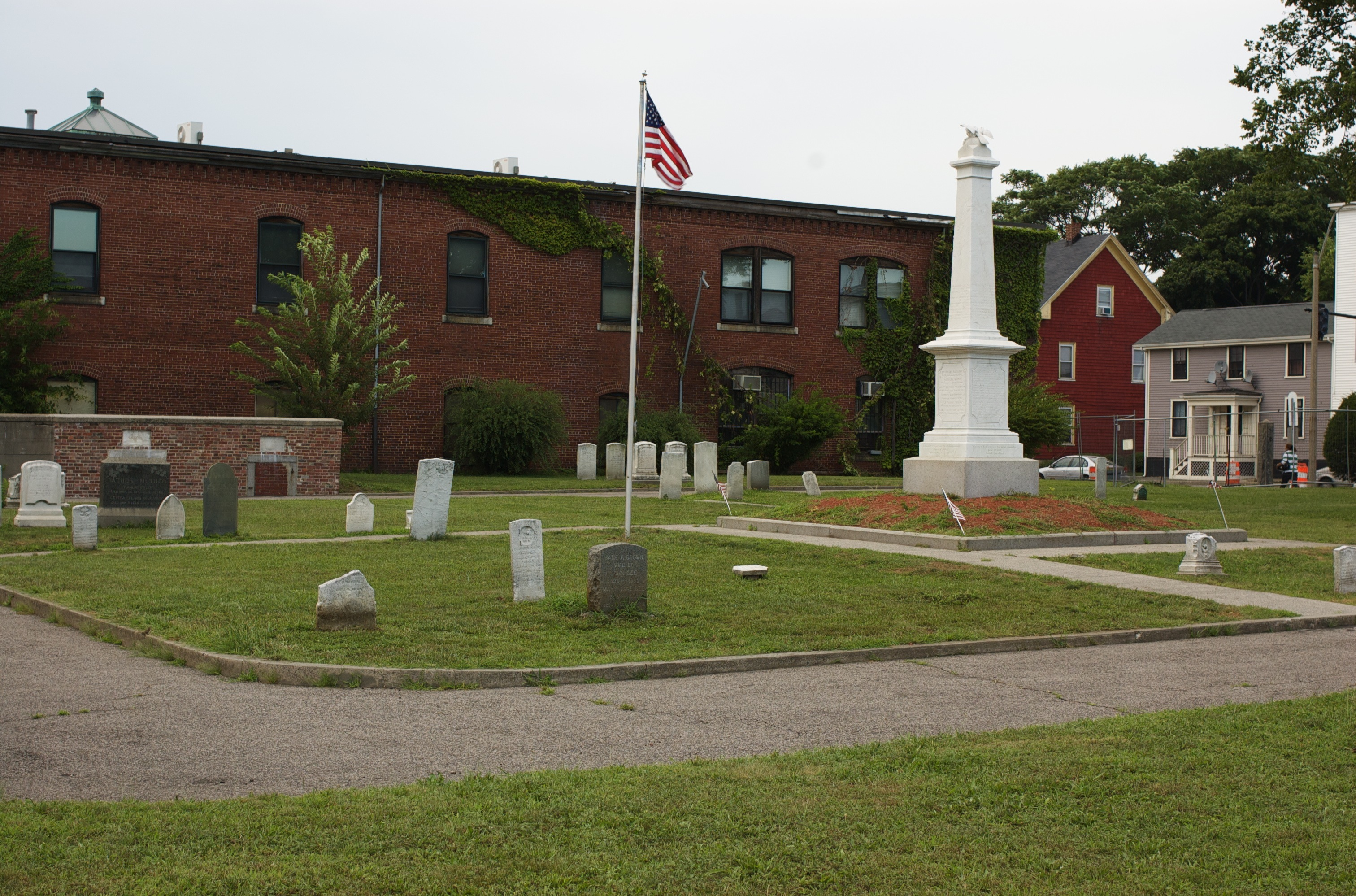

- Location within Massachusetts Location within the United States
- Location: Somerville, Massachusetts
- Coordinates: 42°22′54″N 71°06′07″W
- Built: 1804
- MPS: Somerville MPS
- NRHP reference No.: 89001301
- Added to NRHP: September 18, 1989

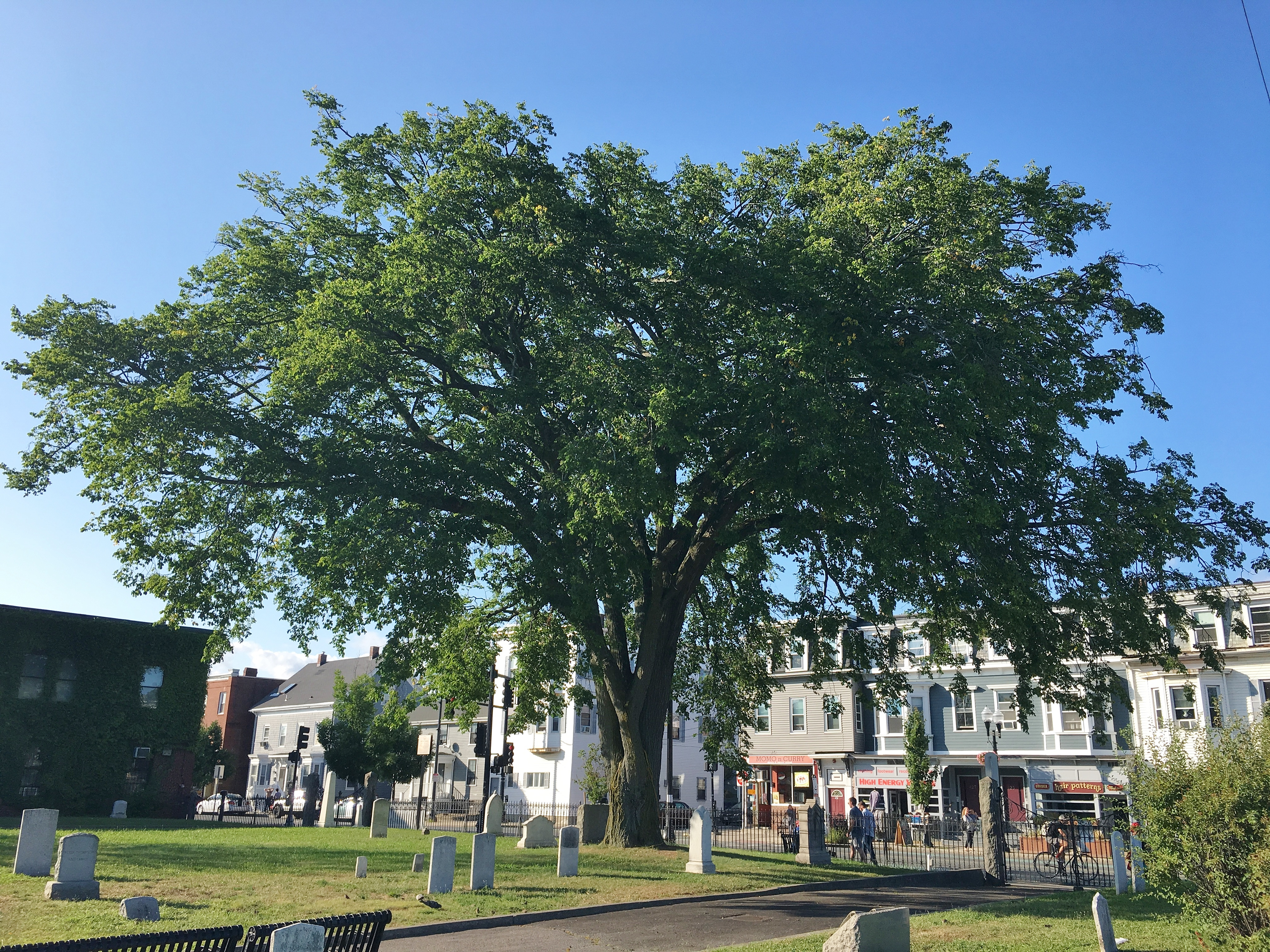
Elm tree at Milk Row Cemetery (August 2019)

The Old Cemetery, also known as the Milk Row Cemetery, is a historic cemetery on Somerville Avenue and School Street in Somerville, Massachusetts. Established in 1804 on land donated by Samuel Tufts, it is the city's oldest cemetery. The cemetery was established when Somerville was still a part of Charlestown, and many Somerville residents used that city's Phipps Street Burying Ground, and later the Mount Auburn Cemetery in Cambridge instead of this one. As a result, this cemetery remained small, and was the only one established within the city limits in the 19th century.

The cemetery was listed on the National Register of Historic Places in 1989.

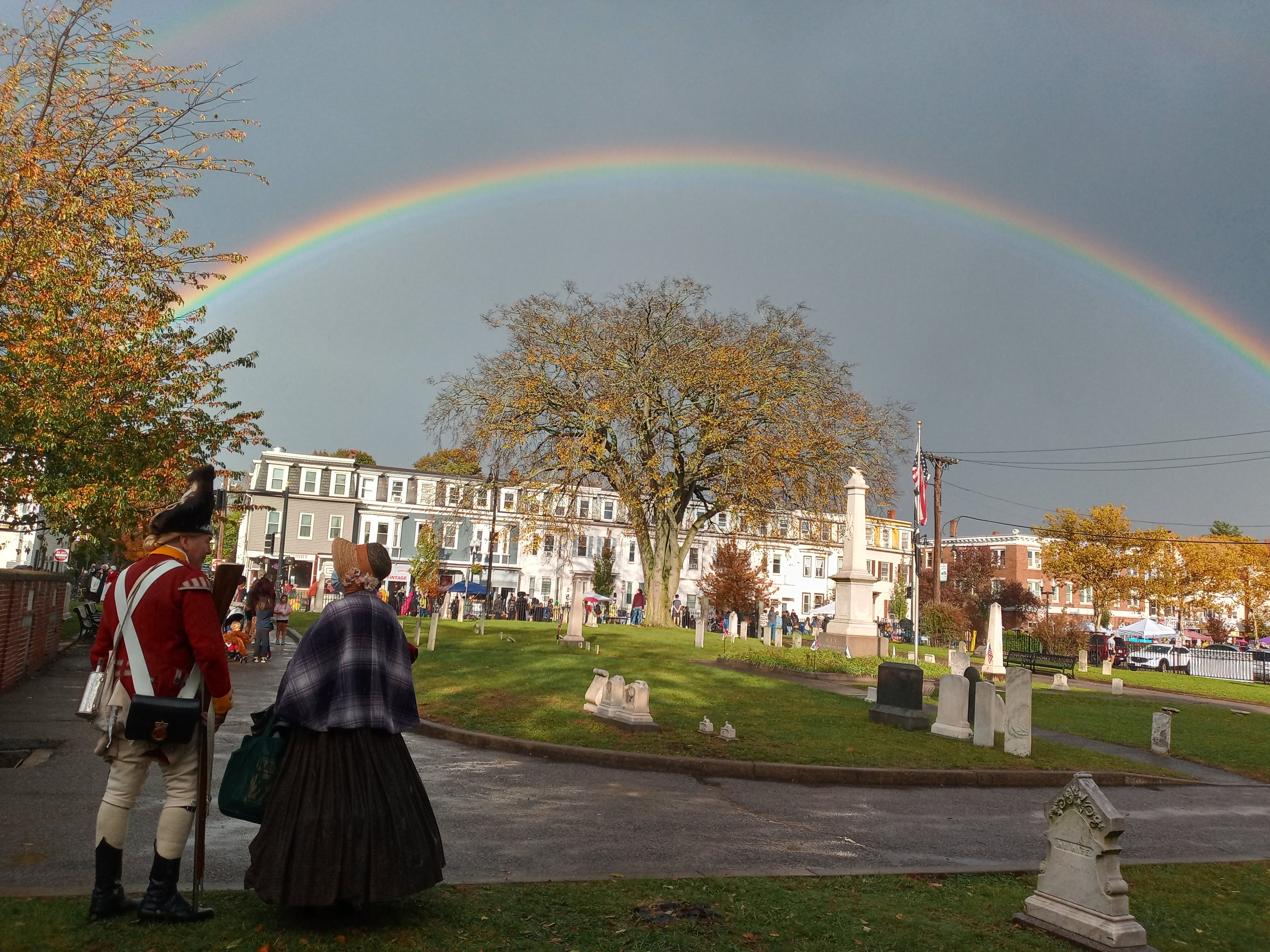
Milk Row Cemetery, Ghosts Of Somerville

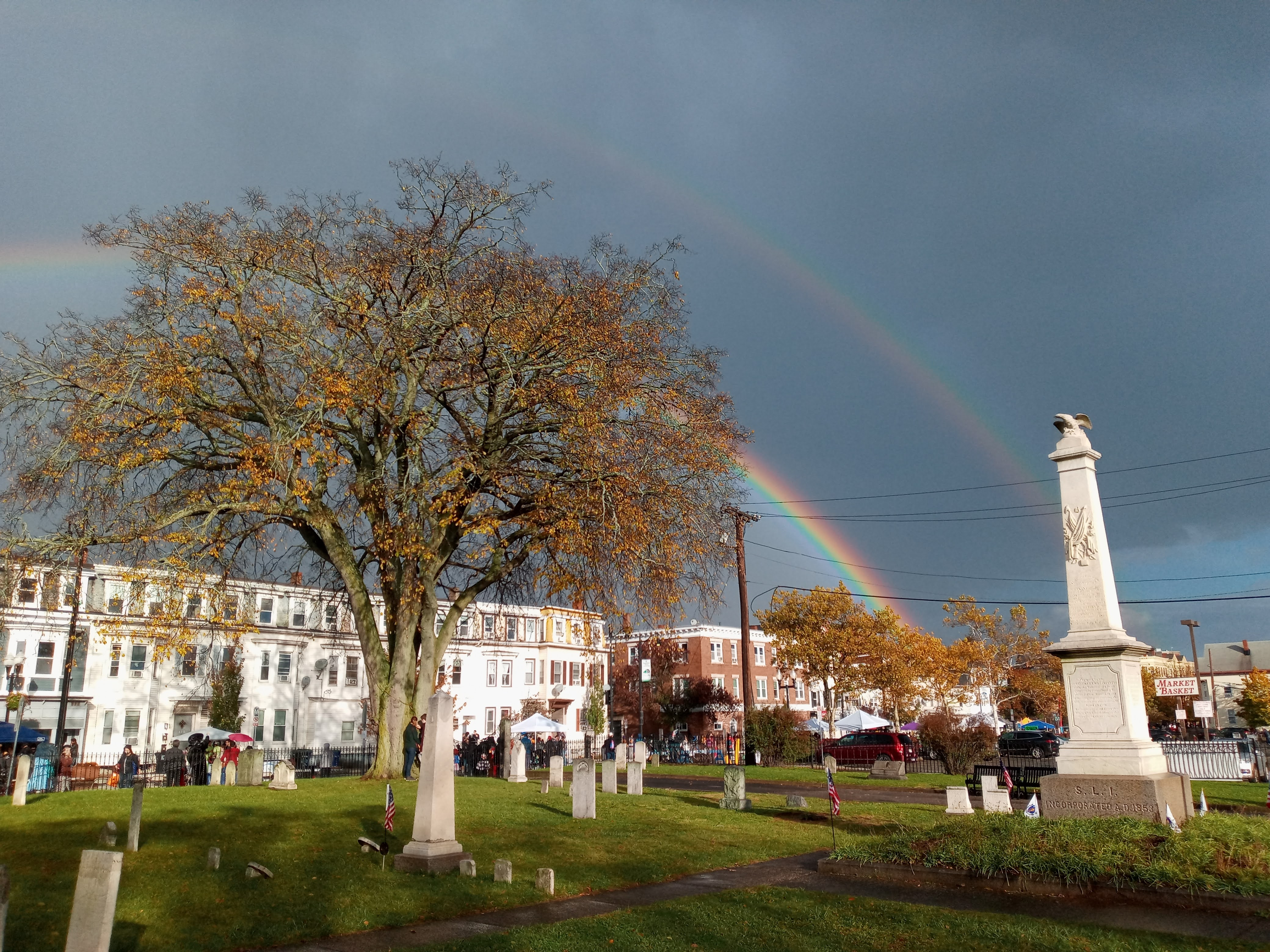
Milk Row Cemetery Civil War monument

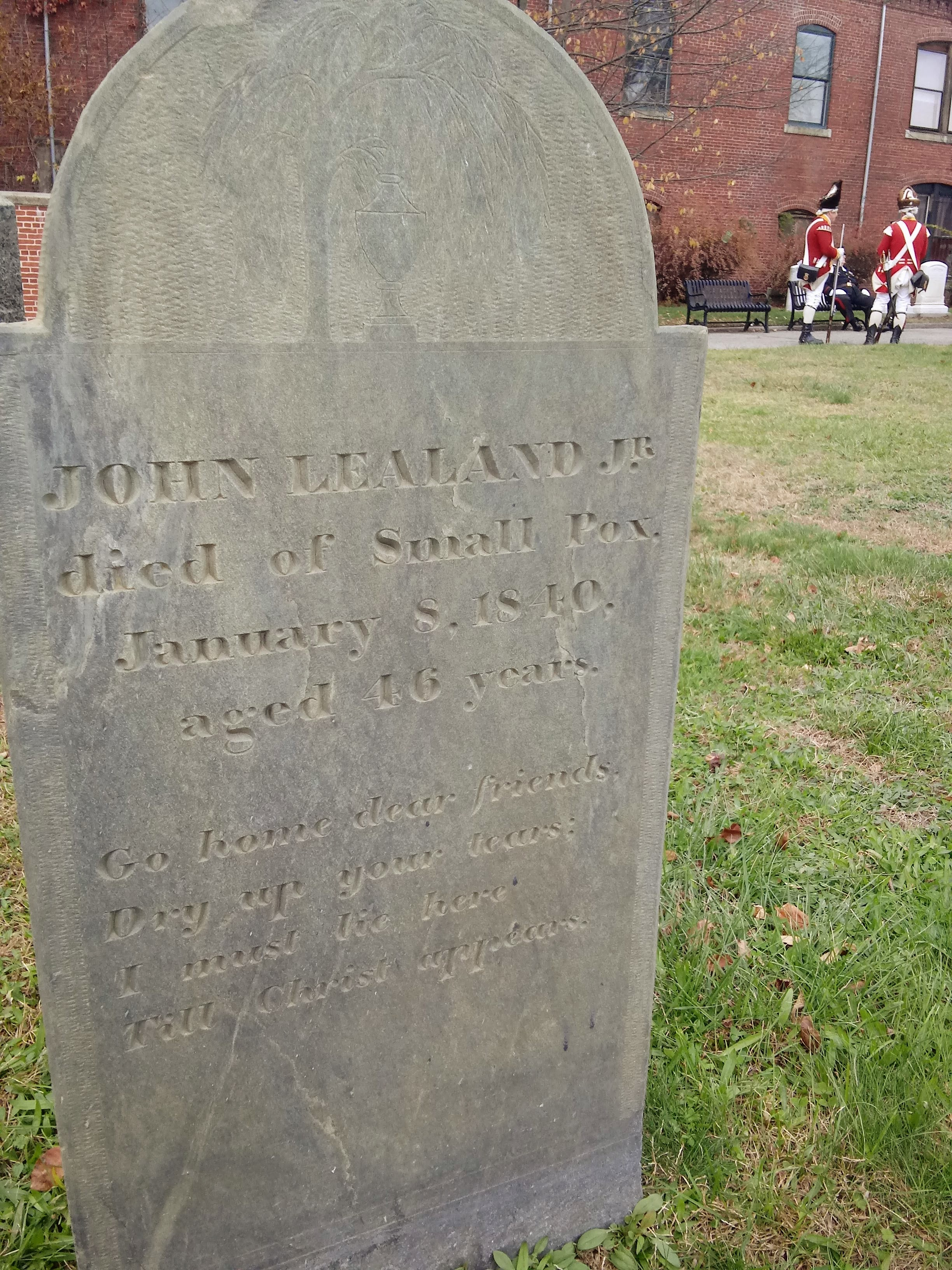
John Lealand grave

The city of Somerville opens the Cemetery for tours during the spring through early fall, and holds a special event called "Ghosts of Somerville" in concert with the annual Halloween Monster Mash event. Costumed guides accompany visitors through some of the historically relevant graves, which includes one of an unknown British soldier of the Revolutionary War era that was discovered and relocated during nearby street reconstruction.

== Civil War monument ==
The American Civil War monument, erected in 1863, is reputed to be one of the first in the nation. Inscriptions around the base include text to honor the service of the SLI, or Somerville Light Infantry, as well as the names of soldiers fallen in the war. The monument was built under the supervision of a committee of the Somerville Light Infantry, and funded by donations. Names and regiments are engraved on the monument, but the list is incomplete. The lot in the cemetery was a gift of Enoch Robinson, and the monument was manufactured by Power & Hall, manufacturers of marble goods of Boston. That firm's junior partner, Charles E. Hall, was a Somerville resident. That same firm created a Civil War monument for Hampden, Maine the following year.

== See also ==
- National Register of Historic Places listings in Somerville, Massachusetts
