= North Graveyard =

Cemetery in Columbus, Ohio

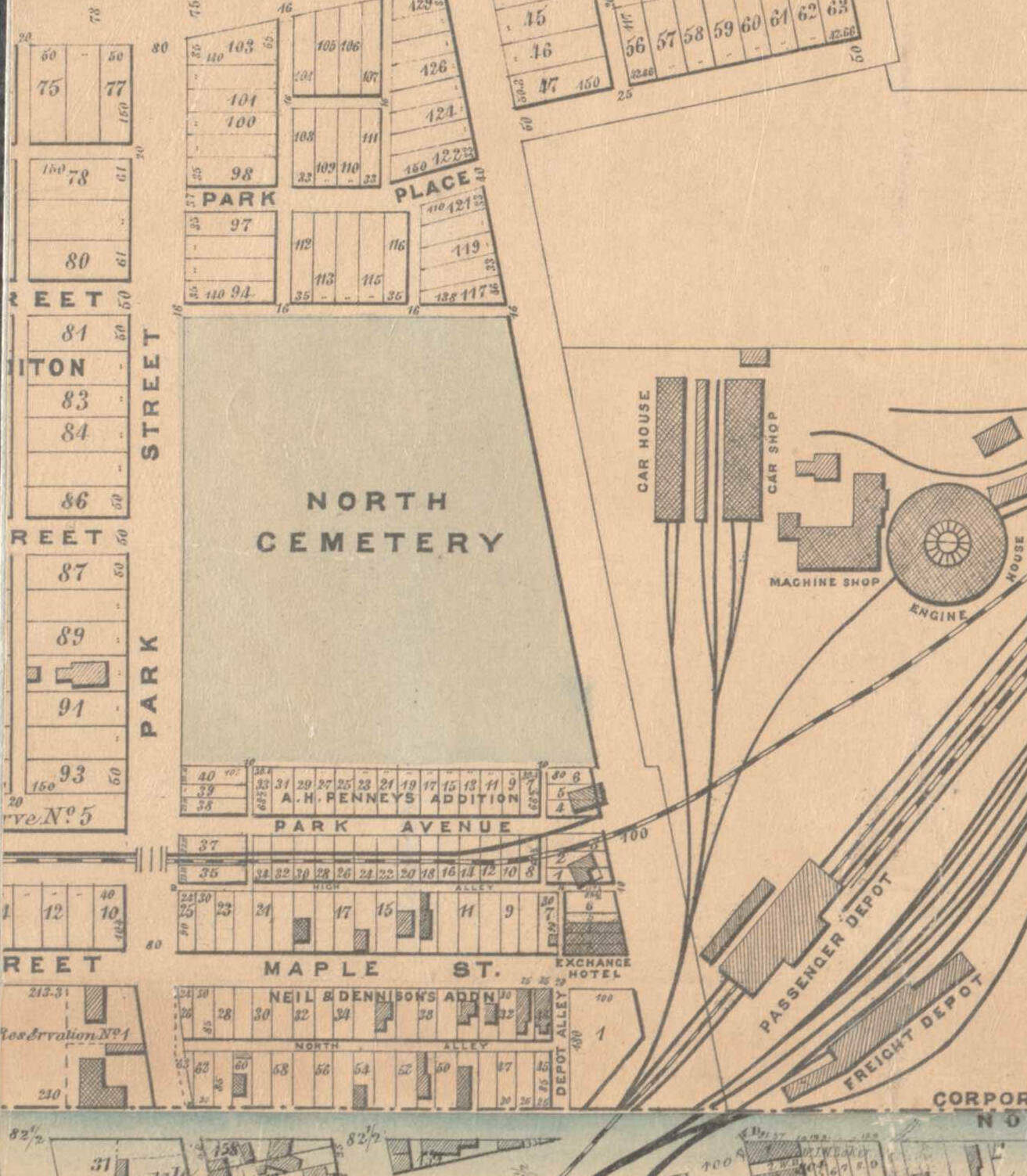
- The cemetery as seen on an 1856 map

Details
- Established: July 2, 1813
- Closed: 1880s
- Location: Columbus, Ohio
- Coordinates: 39°58′19″N 83°00′14″W
- Size: 11 acres (4.5 ha)
- Find a Grave: North Graveyard
- Interactive map pinpointing the location of the burial ground

The North Graveyard, also known as the North Cemetery and Old North Cemetery, was a burial ground in Columbus, Ohio. It was situated in modern-day Downtown Columbus and was established in 1813, a year after the city was founded. Graves at the site were moved beginning in the 1850s into the 1880s.

In the 20th and 21st century, construction projects have involved archaeological digs of portions of the site. Part of the cemetery site will house the Merchant Building, under construction since early 2023, requiring an archaeological study and exhumation of remains left in the graveyard.

== Attributes ==
The graveyard site was at the southeast corner of present-day Park and Spruce streets, in a wooded and somewhat swampy area at the time of creation. It originally had 1.5 acres (0.61 ha).

At its greatest extent, the cemetery had 11 acres. The northern limit of the cemetery was at Spruce Street, where a narrow buggy path existed. The east boundary was at High Street, the west at Park Street, and the south at the present-day railroad tracks. The Brickell Addition, a 20-foot-wide strip, was at the northwest corner of the cemetery. In the present day, North Market, part of the Hilton Columbus Downtown hotel, the Battleship Building, the Vine Street parking garage, and several commercial buildings on High Street are on the former graveyard site.

=== Notable burials ===
Notable Columbus residents originally buried at the graveyard included:

- John Kerr, Columbus' second mayor (1818-19)
- John Brickell, one of several founders of Columbus
- Isaiah Vorys, Revolutionary War veteran who helped lay out the city
- John Wilson Campbell, member of Congress
- Members of the prominent Deshler, Bryden, Buttles, and Parsons families

== History ==
=== Early history ===
The graveyard was dedicated for use on July 2, 1813, a year after the city was founded. It originally had 1.5 acres. John Kerr, one of Columbus's original four proprietors, was to execute a deed giving ownership of the property to Columbus. He did not, and thus the graveyard remained in private hands until 1821. Kerr, by then owner of the property, conveyed the land to the mayor and Borough of Columbus for $1 on June 6, 1821. In 1824, the council provided for the appointment of a sexton, to manage the grounds and dig graves, thus formalizing the operation of the graveyard.

The cemetery was the only burial ground in Columbus through the 1810s and 1820s; the 1799-established Old Franklinton Cemetery was annexed into Columbus along with the rest of Franklinton in 1859. At one time called "the Grave Yard of the City of Columbus", a new graveyard opened on present-day Livingston Avenue in 1841. This became the South Graveyard, with the older site renamed the North Graveyard. The Catholic Cemetery opened in 1846; these two new cemeteries relieved pressure to expand the North Graveyard. An addition called the Brickell Addition was the last expansion, after pioneer John Brickell's death in 1844.

=== Decline, closure, and burial removals ===
By 1848, City Council authorized selling off parcels from the graveyard. Green Lawn Cemetery opened in the following year, summer 1849. In the 1850s, some residents supported the graveyard's continued maintenance and improvements, while others wanted it closed to future interments or completely abandoned. The north and west sides of the graveyard were improved with a tight board fence in 1852.

In the 1850s, some residents owning lots at the graveyard decided to have their relatives' remains exhumed and reburied in Green Lawn Cemetery. These voluntary removals happened at a slow rate. In 1856, city residents petitioned the city council to prevent further interments in the graveyard. The city responded by passing a bill that year banning any graveyard burials within the city boundaries of the time and in the North Graveyard, though it was repealed about a month later. The area was annexed into the city in 1862, further increasing expectations for the graveyard's closure or removal. In 1864, the Green Lawn Cemetery Association proposed that lot owners at the North Cemetery could exchange those with Green Lawn lots, with any remains transferred; the association would eventually lease the North Graveyards spaces to provide income for the cemetery. The offer was taken up by many lot owners, and allowed the city to unanimously pass a new ordinance in 1864 prohibiting any further burials in the graveyard.

In 1868, the Union Depot Company was formed. The company took over the first railroad station in Columbus, Union Depot, located across High Street from the graveyard and built in 1850. It planned for a new station, and the railroads sued the city in order to gain access to land used by the graveyard to expand their rail corridor, with claims that the land was left unmaintained and that the 1864 prohibition on burials ended lot owners' "right of easement". In 1872, a Franklin County court ordered an appointed master commissioner to obtain lots in Green Lawn Cemetery and move all still present Doherty tract remains to the new cemetery. In total, 329 graves were removed at a cost of $2,000, well under the approximately $14,000 paid by the railroad to the city for the land.

In 1876, a market house was built on part of the graveyard property; the market was a predecessor to today's North Market, located adjacent to the site.

Clearing of the original portion, the John Kerr tract, took place from November to December 2, 1881. Most named graves had already been removed; the 867 removed in 1881 were nearly all unknown, and over half were children. After this point, the only remaining part of the graveyard was the Brickell Addition. Most of the graves had been removed privately, but some remained when the city condemned the land in 1889 in order to widen Spruce Street. A thorough job was made in removals, but it was impossible for workers at the time to find every grave on the site. An estimated 2,000 to 3,000 graves were moved from the 1850s to the 1880s. An 1885 city council resolution instructed the city's civil engineer to look into rumors that bodies there were being found during excavations. More remains were found in 1913.

=== Modern excavations ===
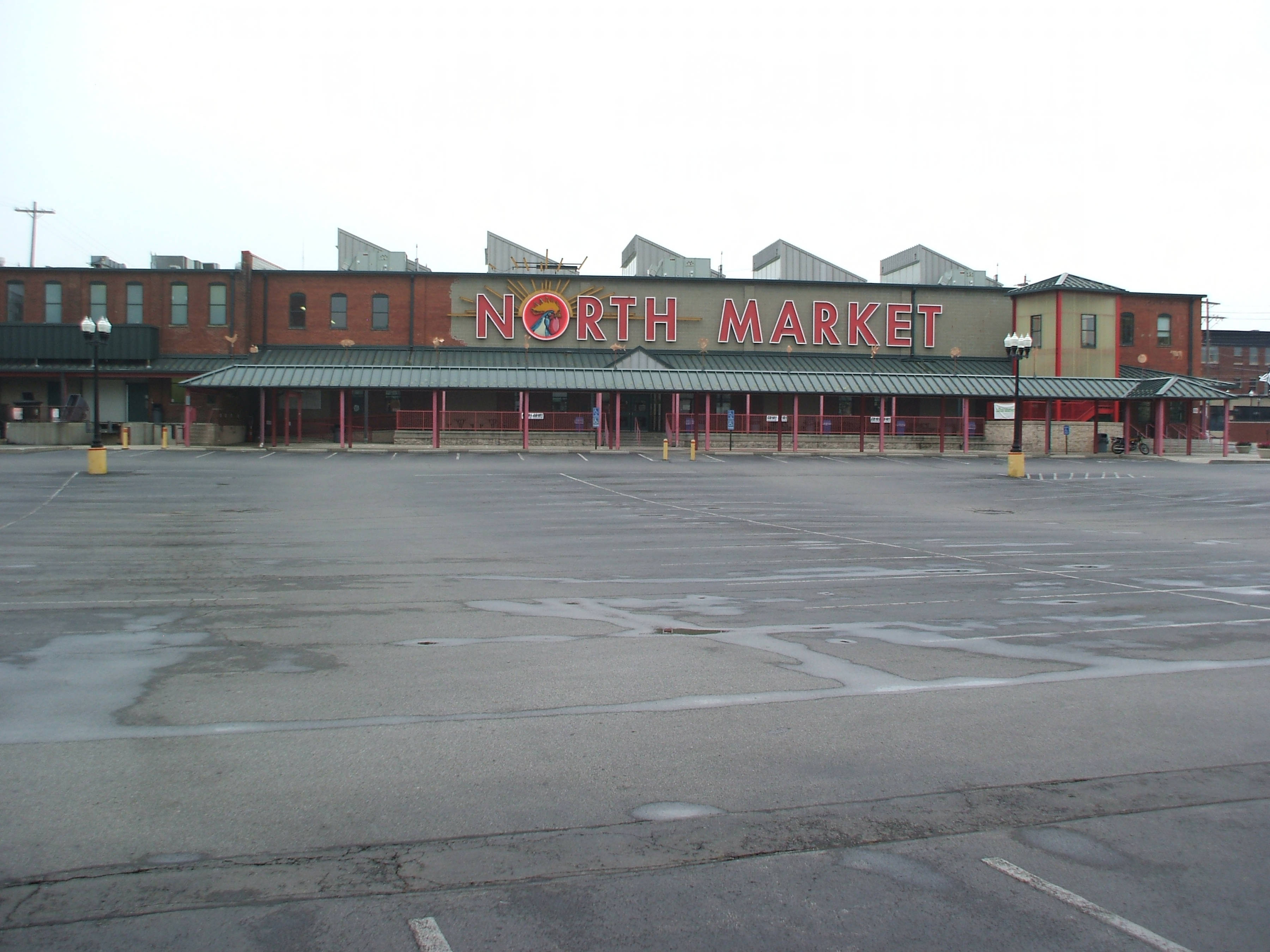
North Market and its parking lot, 2010

In the late 1970s, additional graves were discovered during a sidewalk project at North Market; the remains were relocated to Green Lawn.

In 2001, as part of a sewer project, the city hired archaeologists to excavate the cite, anticipating some remains. The archaeologists found 38 grave shafts under Spruce and Wall streets, finding the remains of 39 individuals, more than what the city expected. The archaeologists' report noted that the site is within the North Market Historic District, and is eligible for listing on the National Register of Historic Places.

In summer 2022, further excavation began as part of the construction of the Merchant Building and redevelopment of North Market. A report written before excavation estimated there could be between 142 and 523 graves with remains still at the site. By February 2023, archaeologists had discovered the buried remains of more than 40 people in the site, with more likely to be found. All discovered remains will be reburied at Green Lawn Cemetery. The R Section of the cemetery, county-owned and used for North Graveyard reburials since the 1800s, was marked with an artwork named Departed Denizens, a 32,000-lb. granite boulder with a bronze wolf sculpture atop it in 2020. The sculpture is dedicated to these early city residents, and was designed by Ohio artist Mike Major. The work references the early settlers' name for the Columbus area as "Wolf's Ridge". It is in a howling stance and facing Downtown Columbus.
