= North Market Historic District =

Historic district in Ohio, United States

- U.S. National Register of Historic Places
- U.S. Historic district
- Columbus Register of Historic Properties
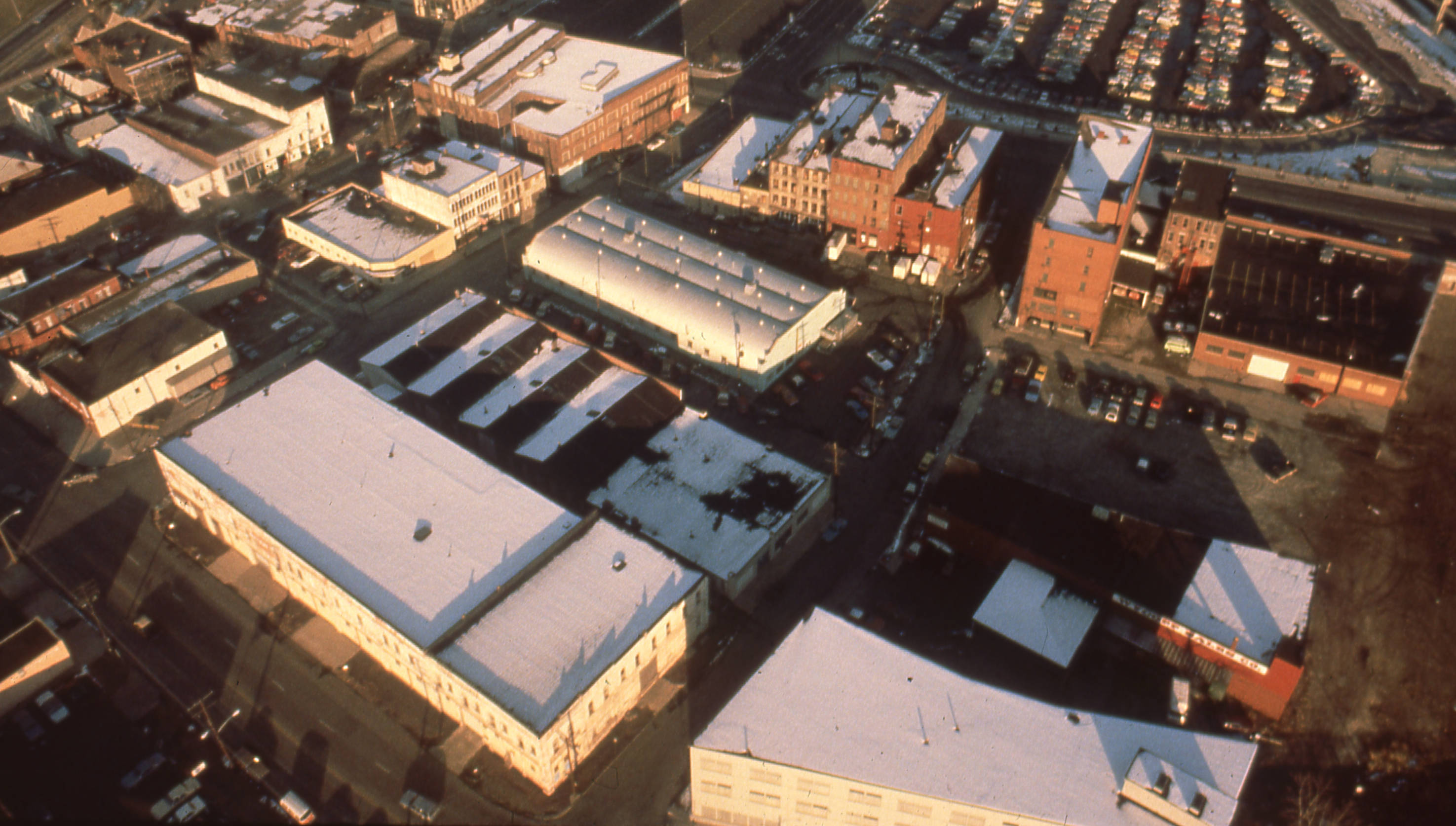
- Overview of the district, 1980
- Interactive map highlighting the district among other historic sites
- Location: Downtown Columbus, Ohio
- Coordinates: 39.971667°N 83.003611°W
- NRHP reference No.: 82001460
- CRHP No.: CR-21

Significant dates
- Added to NRHP: December 30, 1982
- Designated CRHP: September 19, 1983

The North Market Historic District is a historic district in Downtown Columbus, Ohio. The site was listed on the National Register of Historic Places in 1982 and the Columbus Register of Historic Properties in 1983. The district consists of two-to-four-story warehouses, dating from 1880 to 1910.

== Gallery ==
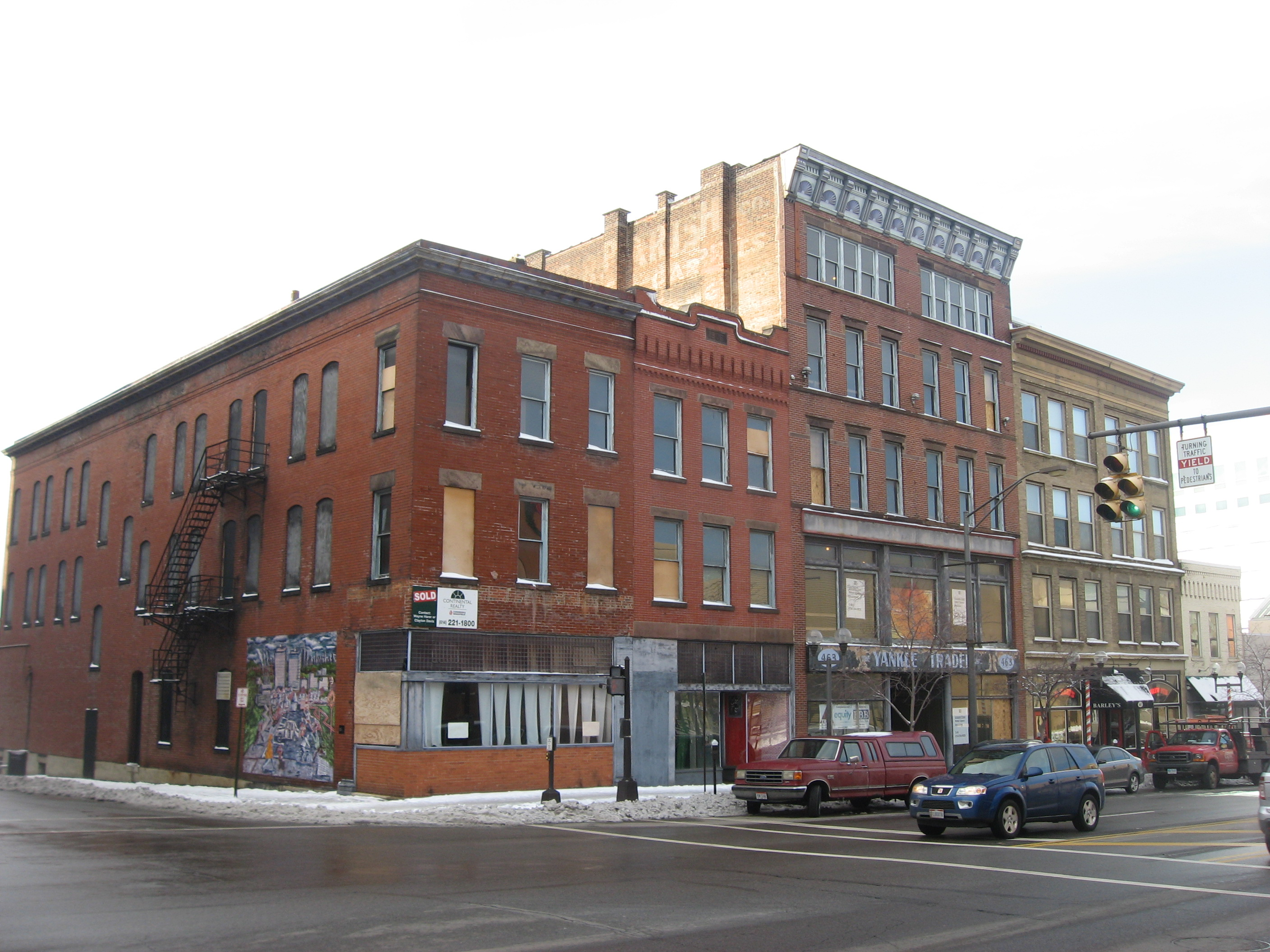
Contributing buildings at High and Vine Streets

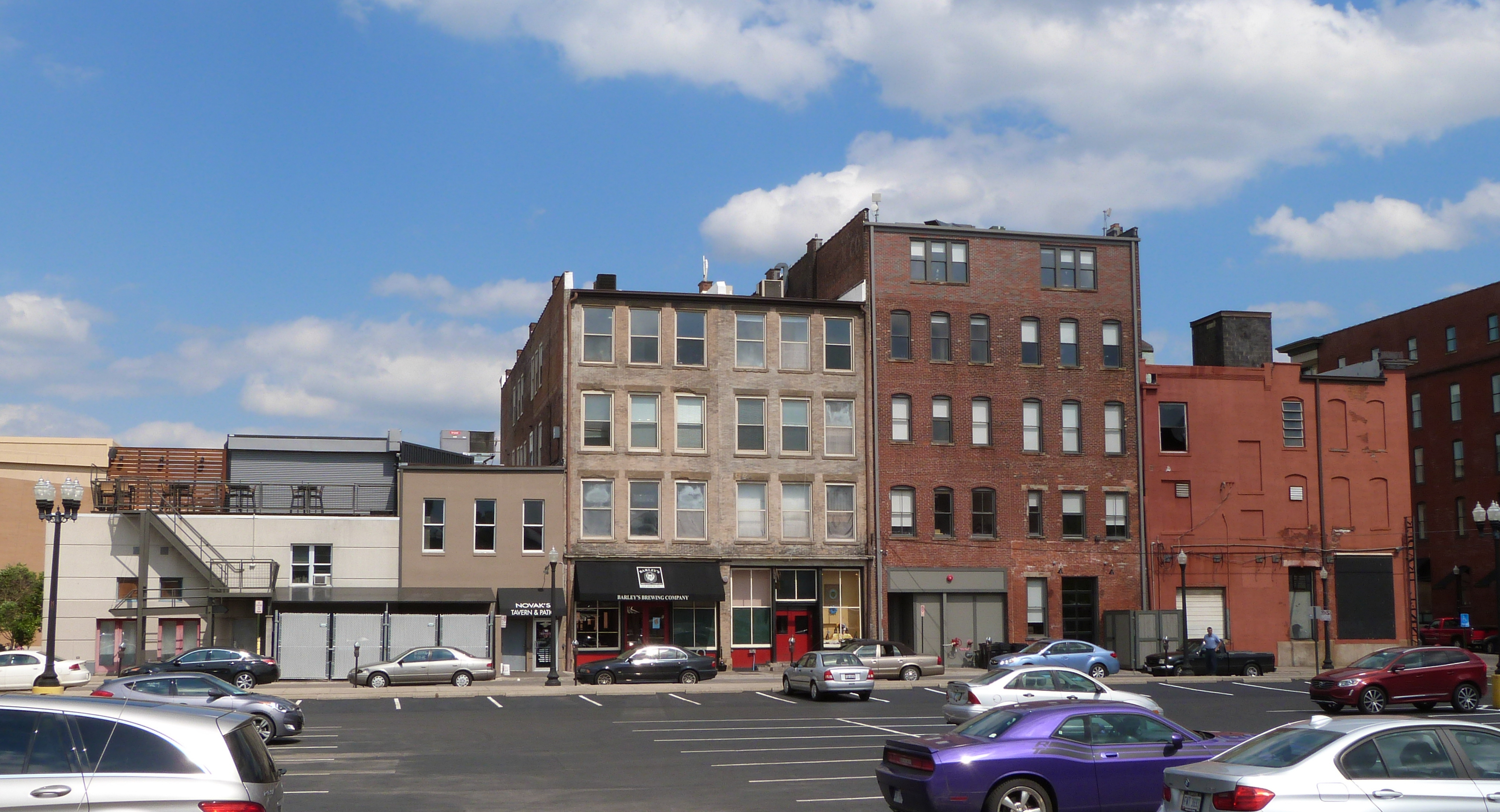
Rear of contributing buildings at High and Vine Streets

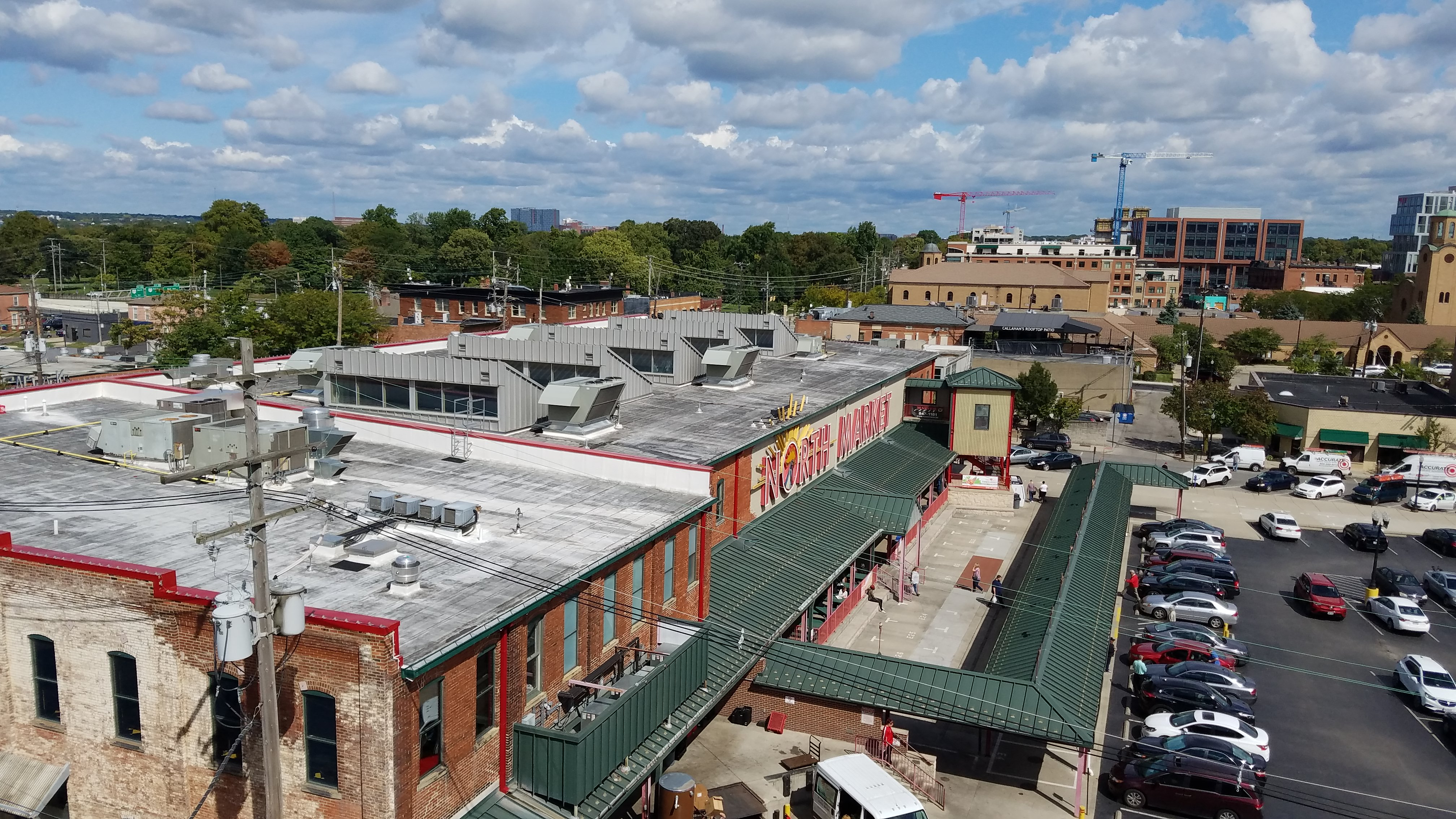
North Market

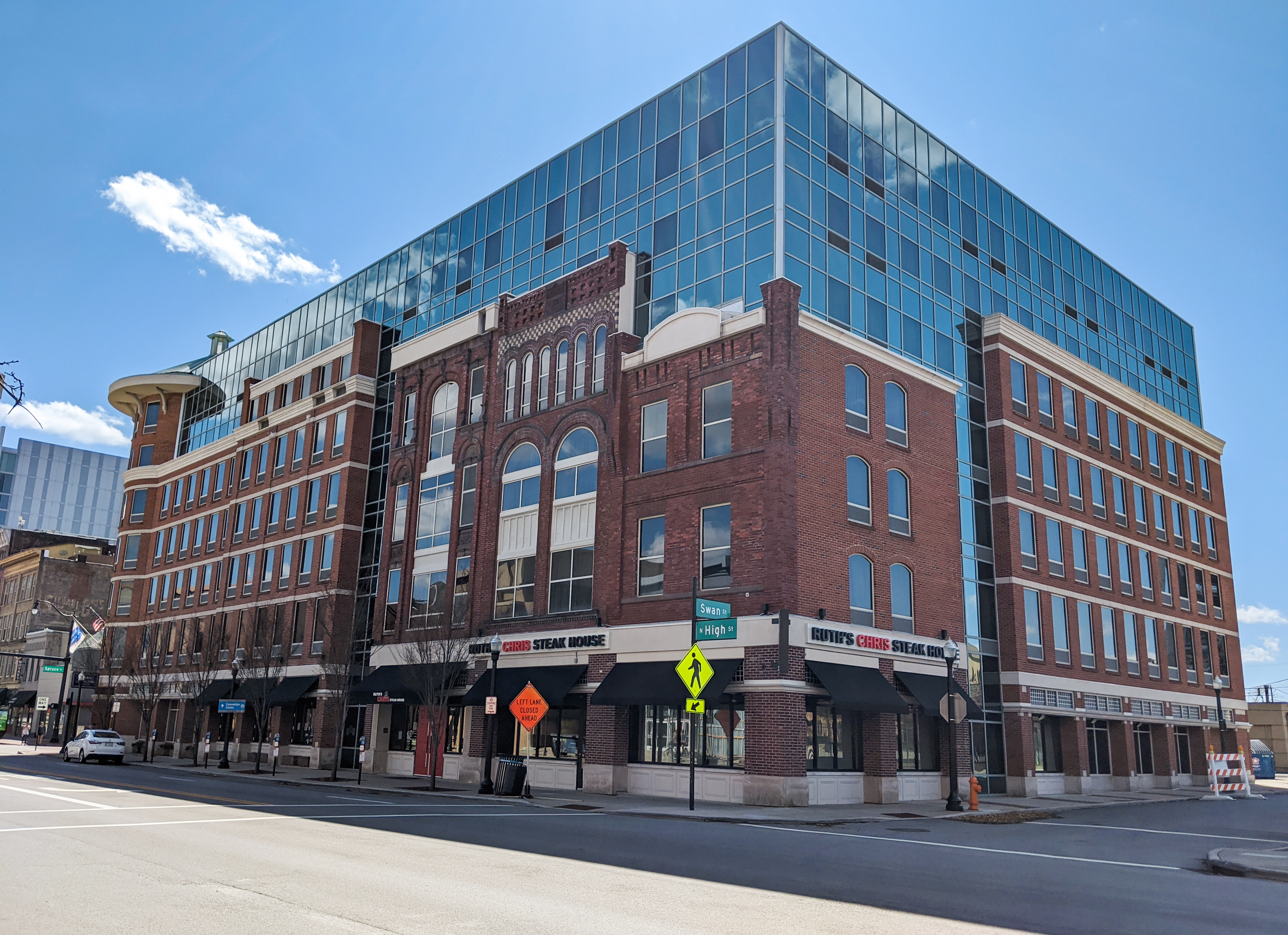
Hampton Inn & Suites Columbus-Downtown incorporates facades of the district's contributing buildings

== See also ==
- National Register of Historic Places listings in Columbus, Ohio
- North Graveyard, formerly on the site
