= Cemetery (disambiguation) =

A cemetery is land reserved for human or animal (pet) remains.

Cemetery or cemetary may also refer to:

- Cemetery (album), an album by Deja Voodoo
- "Cemetery" (Silverchair song), 1997
- "Cemetery" (Charlie Simpson song), 2011
- "Cemetery" (Missy Higgins song), 2018
- Cemetary (band), a Swedish metal band
- Cemetery Reach, a reach of the Brisbane River in Queensland, Australia
