= Downtown Columbus, Ohio =

Neighborhood in Columbus, Ohio

Downtown Columbus
- Central business district
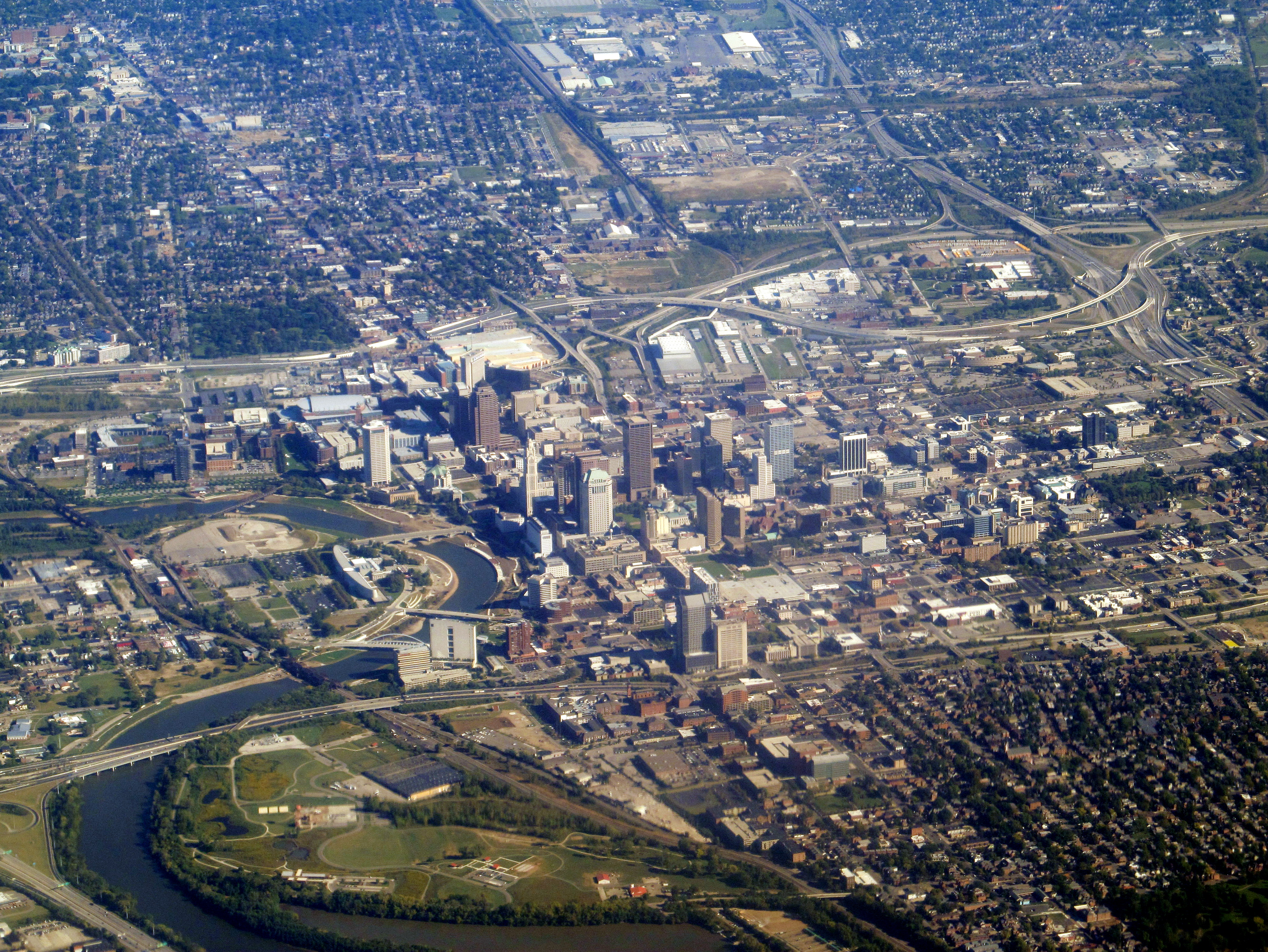
- Downtown Columbus from the southwest in 2015
- Interactive map of Downtown Columbus
- Coordinates: 39°57′45″N 82°59′53″W
- Country: United States
- State: Ohio
- County: Franklin
- City: Columbus

Population (2019)
  - Total: 9,270
- Website: downtowncolumbus.com

Downtown Columbus is the central business district of Columbus, Ohio. Downtown is centered on the intersection of Broad and High Streets, and encompasses all of the area inside the Inner Belt. Downtown is home to most of the tallest buildings in Columbus.

The state capitol, the Ohio Statehouse, is located in the center of downtown on Capitol Square. Downtown is also home to Columbus State Community College, Franklin University, Columbus College of Art and Design, Grant Medical Center, Capital University Law School, as well as the Main Library of the Columbus Metropolitan Library, the pioneering Main Street Bridge, and many parks.

Downtown has many neighborhoods or districts, but it can be separated into three main areas: the Discovery District, the High Street Corridor, and the Riverfront. Downtown also includes the Arena District, Capitol Square, and the Columbus Civic Center. The Short North, Italian Village, and Victorian Village are directly north of downtown. The Warehouse District, Olde Towne East and King-Lincoln Bronzeville are directly east, while the Brewery District and German Village are directly south of Downtown. Franklinton is to the west of downtown.

More than 92,000 people are employed downtown, and nearly 43,000 students attend school at one of the many institutions of higher education located there. As of 2024, Downtown is home to about 12,500 residents.

== History ==
The city of Columbus began development in 1812 with the purpose of being the state's new capital. Originally laid out by Lucas Sullivant as the town of Franklinton, the original settlement lay west of the Scioto River. However, Sullivant laid out plans to expand east of the river for what is now downtown Columbus. Development began quickly and by 1814 significant buildings included a penitentiary, the first school, the statehouse, the first newspaper, and the first church. By 1816, Columbus was incorporated as an official town, and in 1824 Columbus became the official seat of the county and elected its first mayor, John Brooks, in 1834 after being elevated to "city" status. The city of Columbus has spread out and around from the original 10 acres (4.0 ha; 0.040 km^{2}) plot surrounding the Statehouse, making downtown the literal center of the city. Another pivotal element of downtown Columbus is the Scioto River, which snakes directly through downtown. The downtown of Columbus has changed roles since its founding, going from a government center, to an industrial and commercial center, to what it currently is as the major commercial hub of central Ohio. The first modern skyscraper to adorn downtown Columbus' skyline is LeVeque Tower, built in 1927. Many other high rises and skyscrapers have been added since the LeVeque Tower, fitting a variety of uses from commercial to residential.

=== Urban renewal ===
In the early 1950s, major cities began revitalization projects of slums and blighted areas in their communities. Assisted by federal and state funding, these were intended to clear major slums in an effort to revitalize that area for the overall welfare of the city. In January 1952, the Department of Development for the city of Columbus began commissioning task forces in an effort for urban renewal in the blighted areas. The efforts of these task forces are evident in numerous older communities and districts, including Market Mohawk and German Village.

== Geography ==
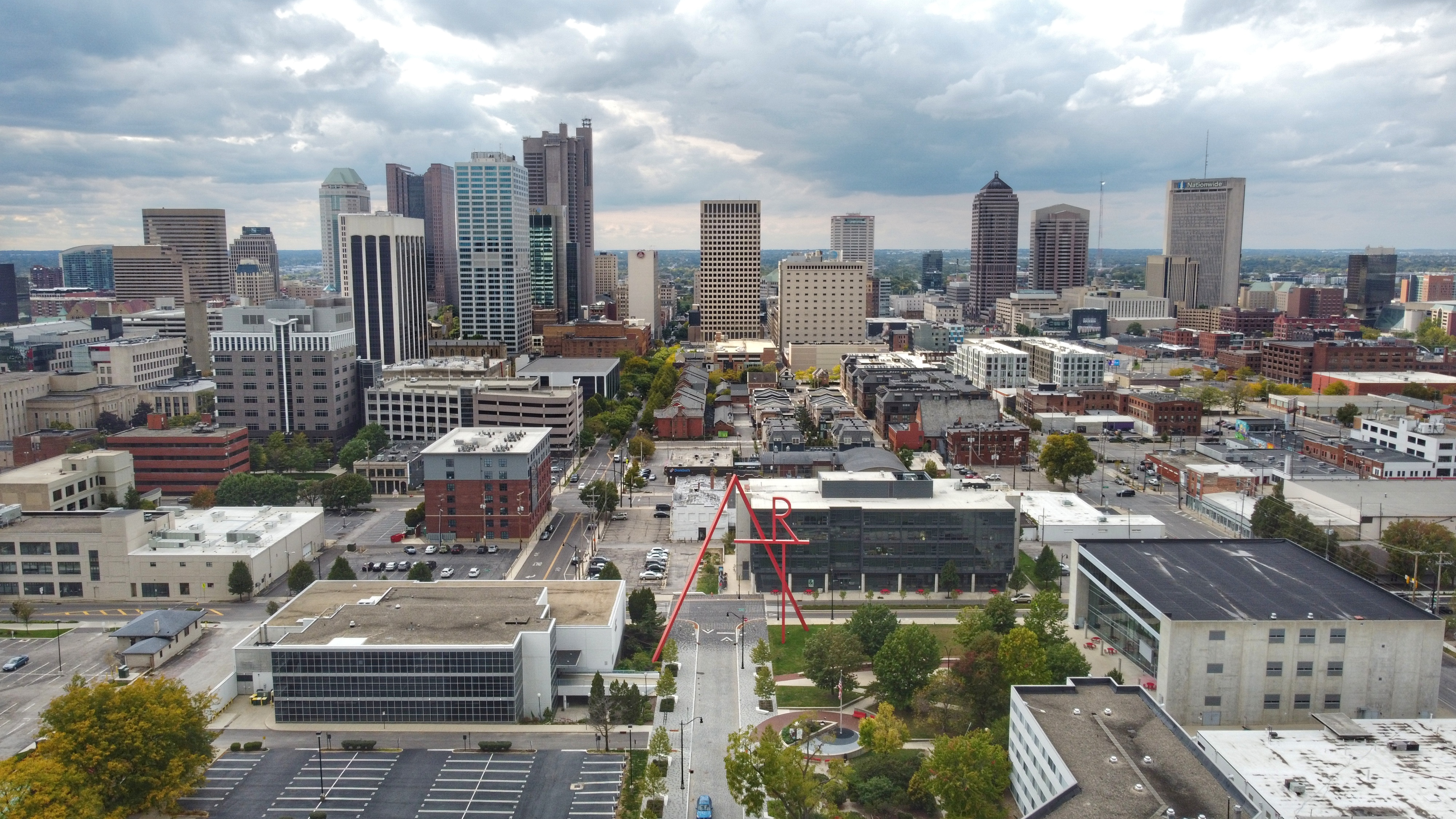
Western portion of downtown from the Discovery District

Columbus' location was chosen based on its central location within the state of Ohio along with the confluence of the Scioto River and Olentangy River being right next to it. Originally, part of the area that is now Columbus was to be allotted to those displaced from Nova Scotia during the American Revolution, and the original settlement lay about a mile west of the Scioto River and the current downtown area. The center of downtown Columbus is focused on the intersection of Broad Street and High Street. The City of Columbus includes an area of around 225 square miles, but downtown is generally referred to as the area within the Scioto River, Interstate 70, Interstate 71, and Interstate 670. The last of these major highways, I-670, was completed in 2003. Downtown Columbus is bordered to the north by The Short North, to the northwest by Grandview Heights, to the southwest by Franklinton, to the south by German Village, and to the east by King-Lincoln Bronzeville. Downtown Columbus has several districts that make up its diverse area.

=== Arena District ===
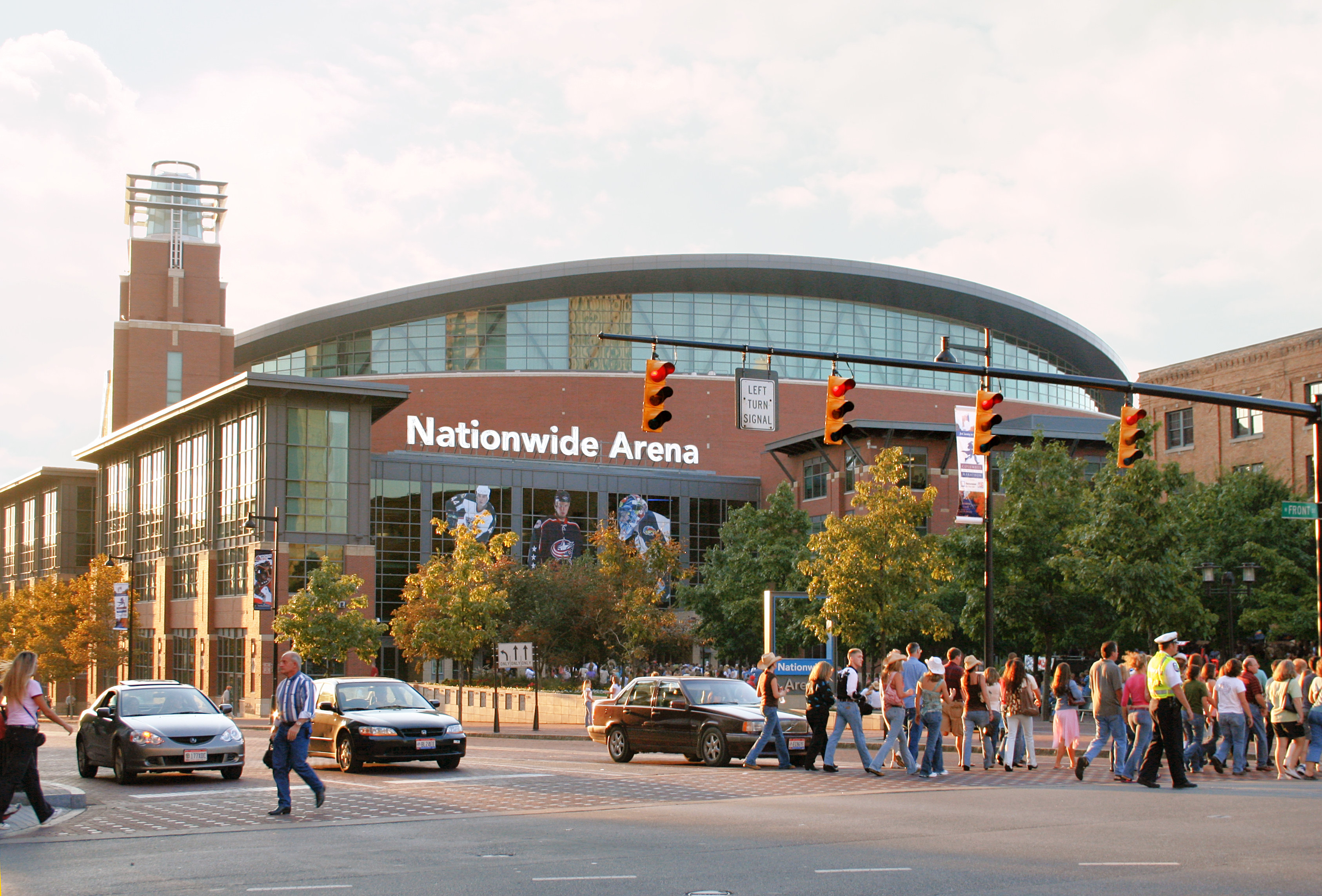
Nationwide Arena

The Arena District sits on the northwest side of downtown Columbus, with its borders roughly being Nationwide Arena to the north, Front Street to the east, Spring Street to the south, and the Olentangy River to the west. The district is home to a few defining buildings, including Nationwide Arena, Huntington Park, and the LC Pavilion. Nationwide Arena is the home of the Columbus Blue Jackets, as well as a venue for a variety of other sporting and special events. Occasionally, the Ohio State University men's and women's basketball teams will also use the facility to host special games. Nationwide first began hosting concerts and hockey games in early 2000. Huntington Park is the home of the Columbus Clippers, which is a minor league affiliate team of the Cleveland Guardians. Huntington Park was opened for games in spring 2009, making its debut in the Arena District. Huntington Park sits directly west of Nationwide Arena. The LC Pavilion (formerly the Promowest Pavilion) is the first dual indoor and outdoor concert venue in the country. The LC hosts mainly musical acts, averaging just about 110 shows each year. The district also plays host to a variety of bars, restaurants, and cafes in the area. The district originally contained old industrial buildings, but began redevelopment in 1996 under then City Councilman Michael B. Coleman.

=== Discovery District ===
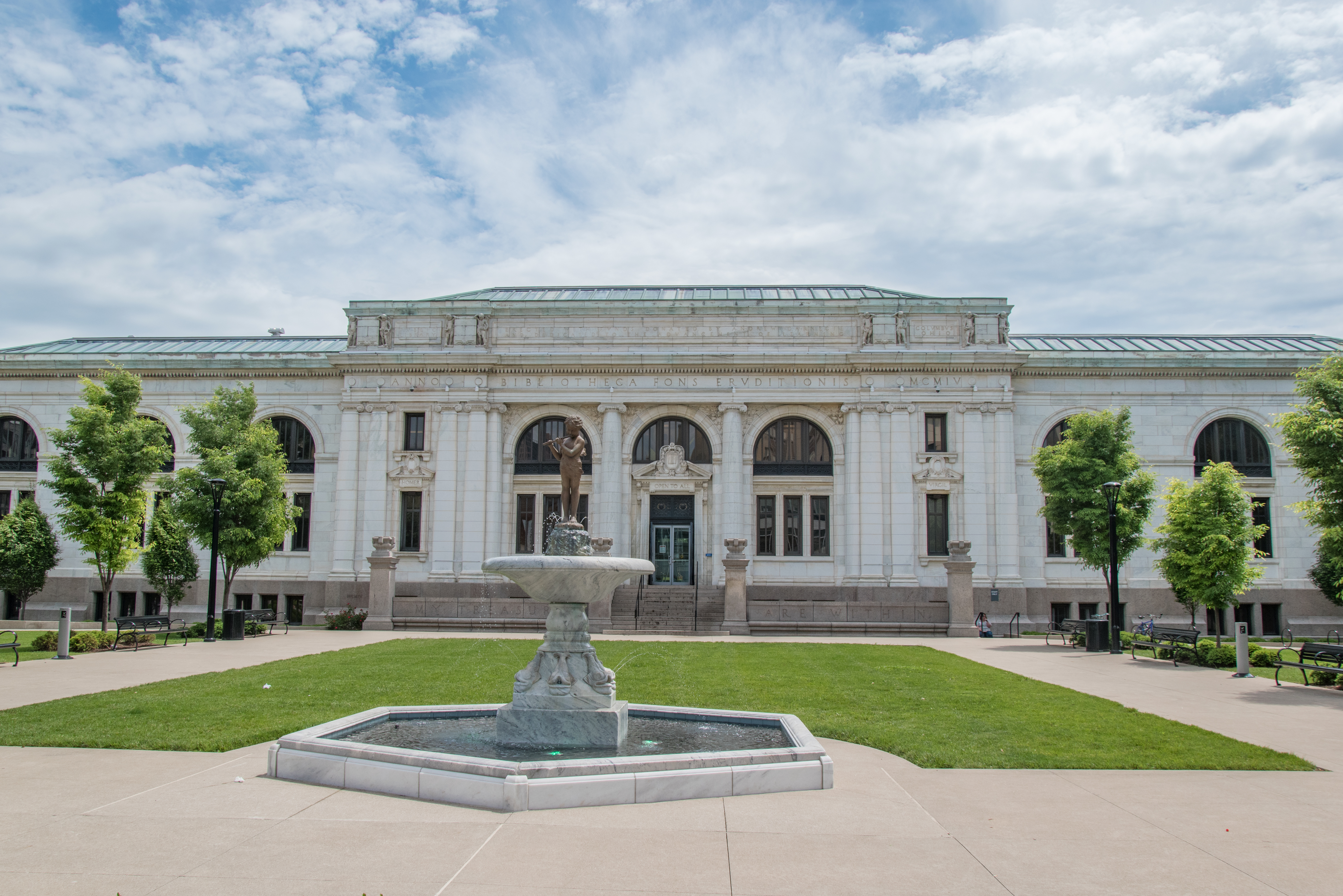
The Columbus Metropolitan Library's Main Library

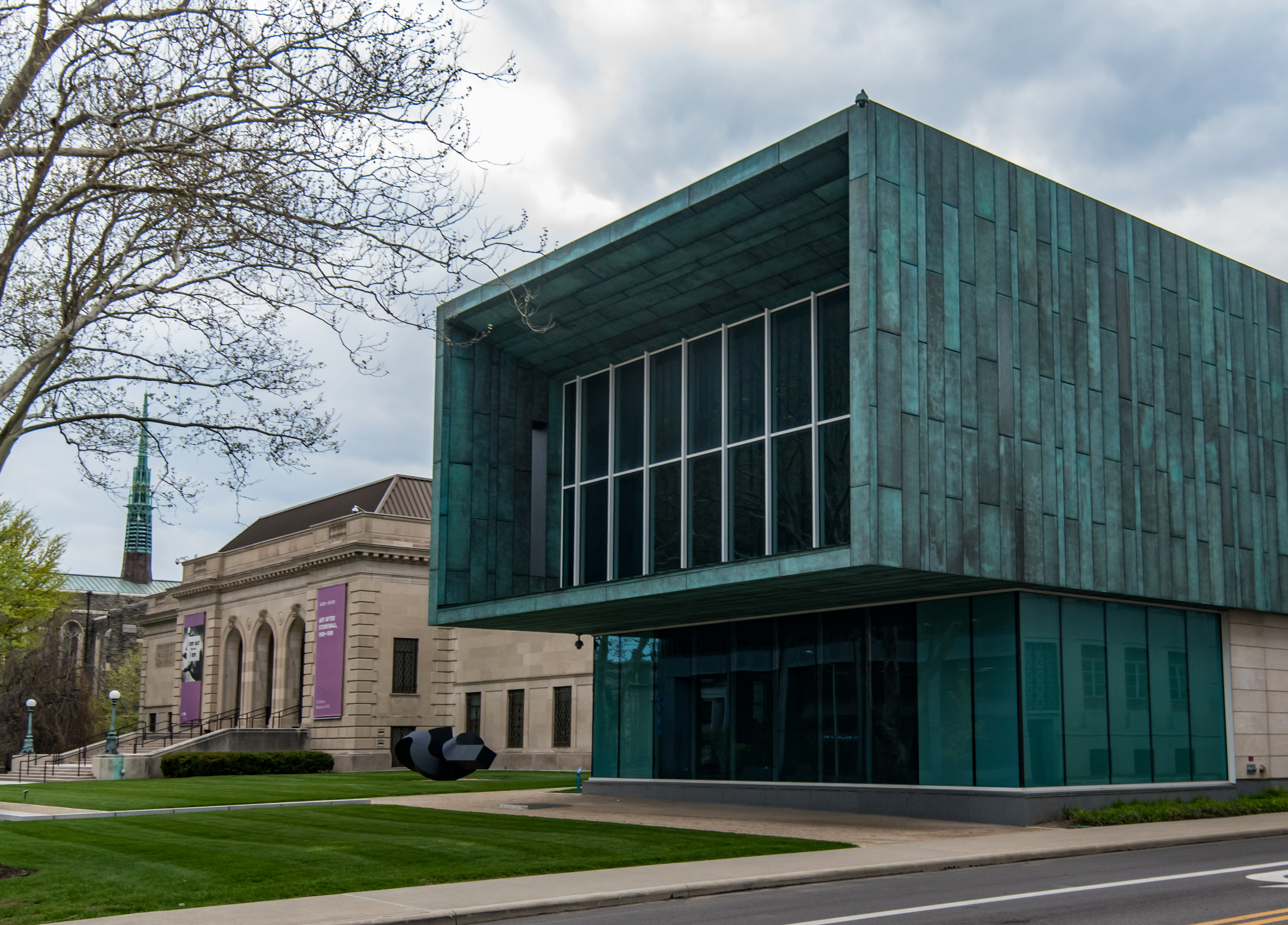
The Columbus Museum of Art

The Discovery District is the eastern district of downtown Columbus. Interstate 670 borders it to the North while Interstate 71, Fulton Street, and Fifth Street borders it to the East, South, and West, respectively. Within the Discovery District are buildings of culture, art, design, and education. The Columbus Metropolitan Library's Main Library and the Columbus Museum of Art are both located within the district. Also, there are numerous educational options within this district. Columbus State Community College is a two-year associates-degree institution located in the Discovery District with an enrollment of just under 25,000 students. Also located in the district are the Columbus College of Art and Design, which was founded in 1879 as the Columbus Art School and enrolls roughly 1,300 students, and the Capital University Law School. The ABA-accredited law school is a branch of Capital University in Bexley, Ohio. Within the Discovery District is The Discovery Special Improvement District. The goal of this private-sector corporation, that encompasses a 37 square block area, is to improve the safety and image for the Discovery District neighborhood.

=== River South District ===
The River South District is the southwest area of downtown Columbus along the Scioto River that is surrounded by Town Street to the North, Mound Street to the South, The Scioto River to the West, and Wall Street to the East. One of the main attractions of the River South District is a 7 acres (2.8 ha; 0.028 km^{2}) green space called Columbus Commons. Columbus Commons was built over the former site of City Center Mall in 2010 and includes within it the outdoor venue Bicentennial Pavilion. Another area of interest is the Scioto Mile which is a network of parks and trails that follow the riverfront of the Scioto River. Attractions along the Scioto Mile include Bicentennial Park and the River South Art Walk.

=== Uptown District ===
The Uptown District, also known as the High Street Corridor, runs along High Street from Town Street in the south to the Greater Columbus Convention Center in the North. The Ohio Statehouse resides in the Uptown District, as well as a series of bars and restaurants to the north along Park Street. The Uptown District is also home to the Ohio Theatre, the Palace Theatre, and the Trinity Episcopal Church. LeVeque Tower, Columbus' first skyscraper, also resides in the Uptown District, west of the Ohio Statehouse and on the banks of the Scioto River.

=== Miranova Place District ===
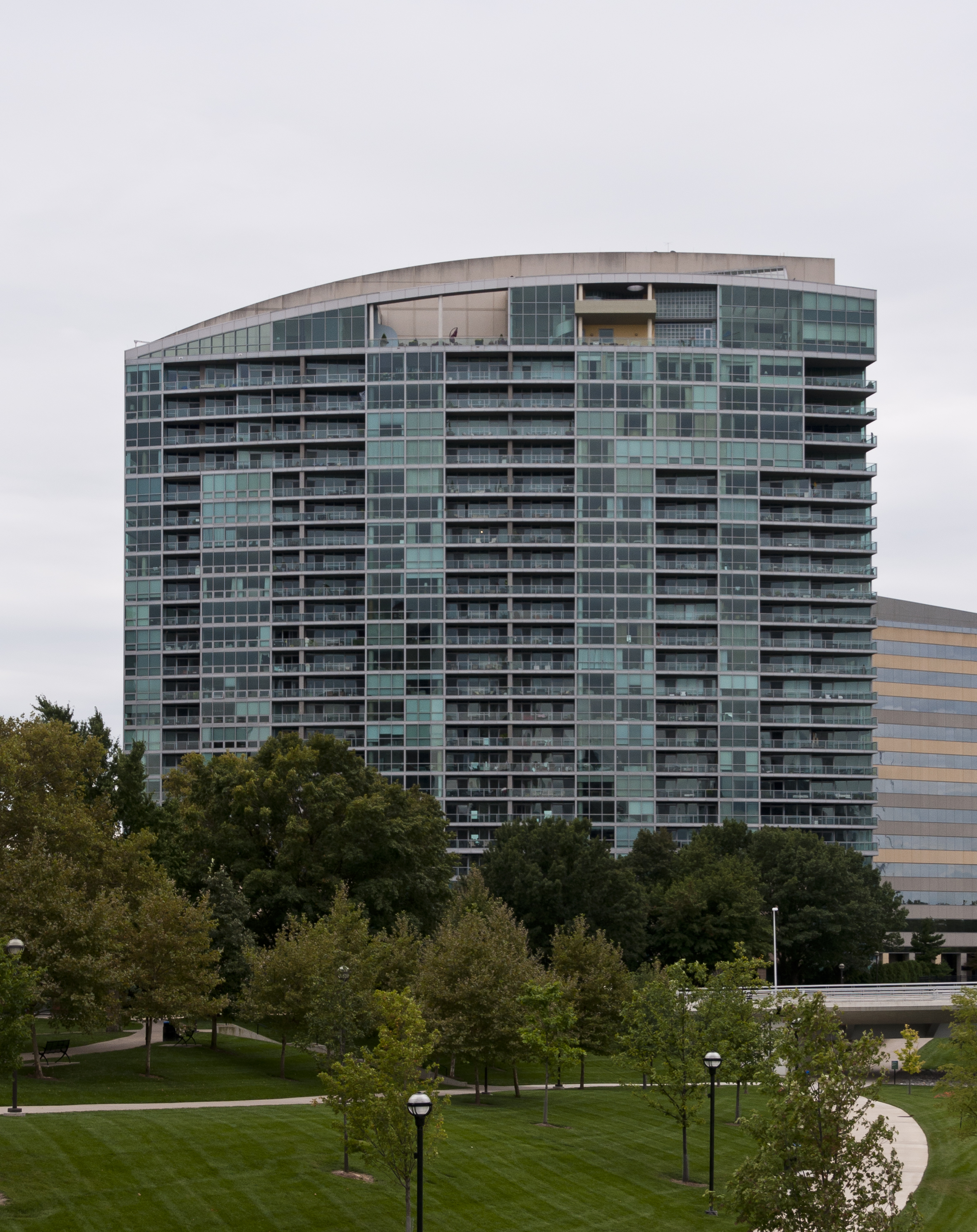
Miranova Condominiums

Miranova Place is located within the southwestern corner of downtown. It is bordered by the Scioto River to the north and west, Interstate 70 to the south, and South Civic Center Drive to the east. Within it lies two major features, the Miranova Condominiums and the Miranova Corporate Tower. The condominiums are a 26-floor residential unit, finished in 2000. The Miranova Corporate Tower is a 12-floor corporate office space that was finished in 2001. The buildings designs reflect a modern architecture meant to serve as a bookend for downtown before it reached the Scioto River and I-70. The buildings are owned by developer Ron Pizutti, and serve currently as his headquarters.

=== Market-Mohawk District ===
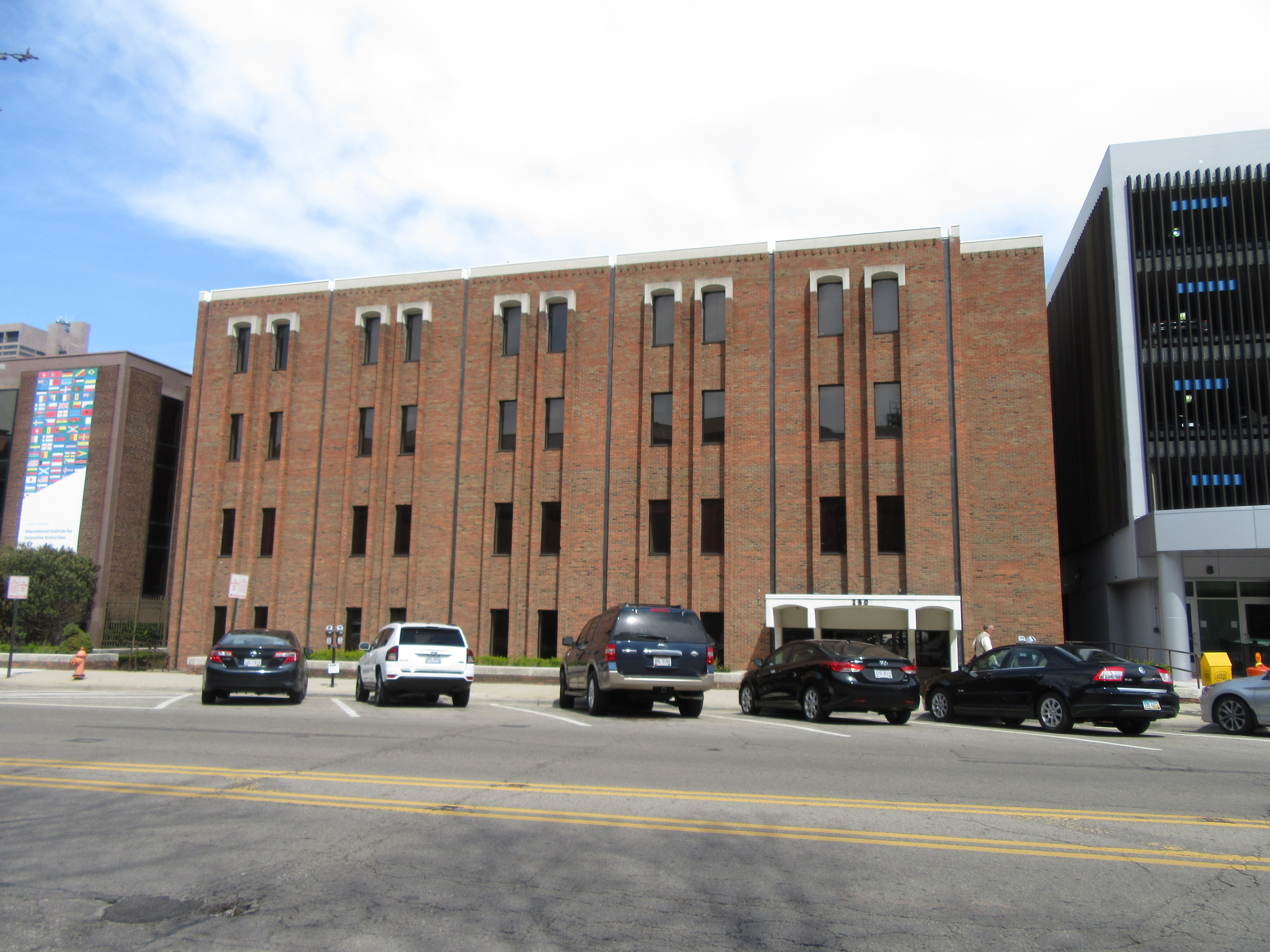
The Market-Mohawk Center, part of midcentury urban renewal in Downtown Columbus

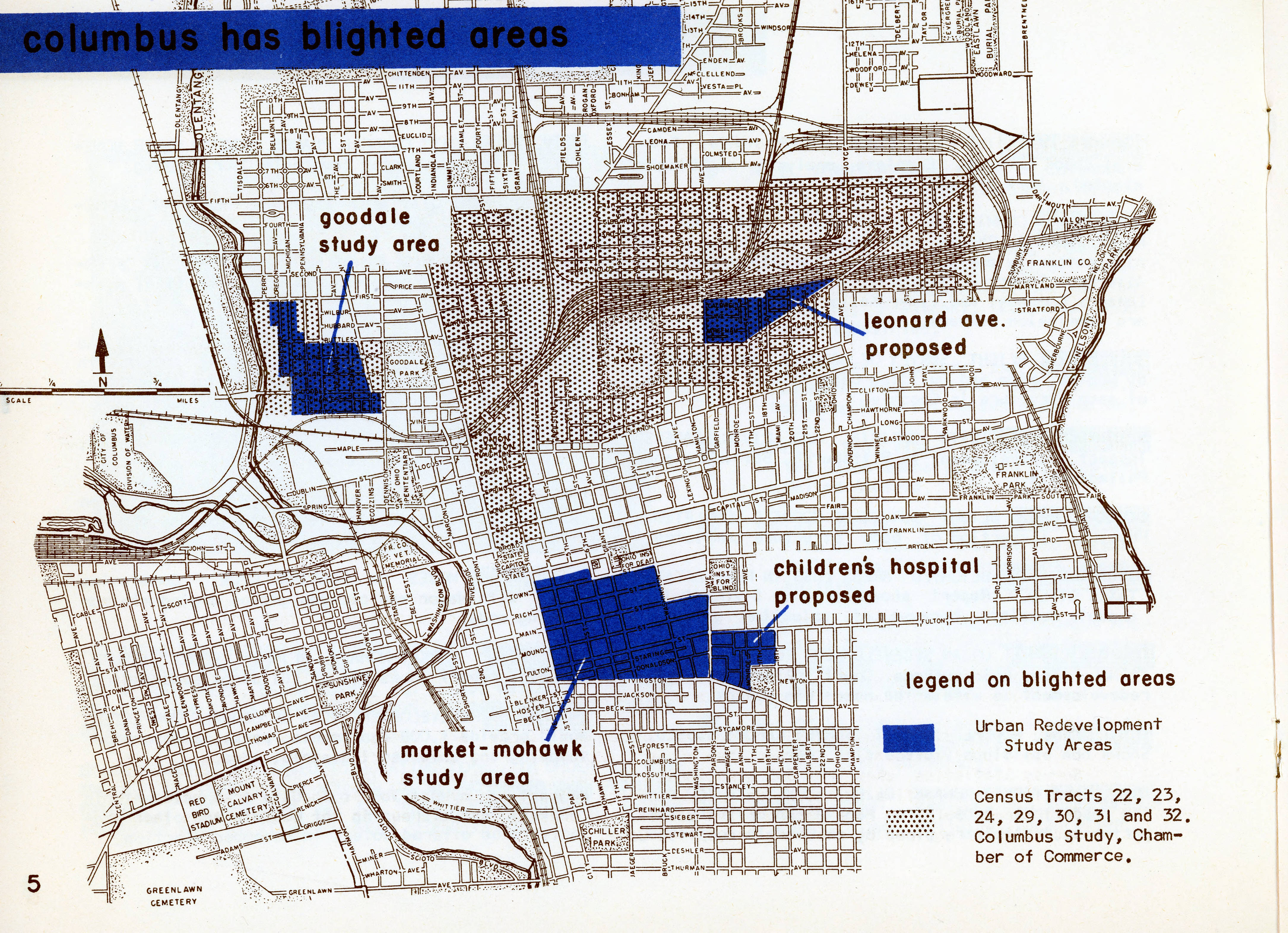
The Market-Mohawk area delineated with other districts in a 1954 urban renewal map

The Market-Mohawk District is located in the southeastern section of downtown and is bordered to the north irregularly by Chapel, Town, and Main Streets, Livingston Avenue to the South, South Parsons Avenue to the East, and to the west South Third Street. The Market-Mohawk District was originally a residential area of single family homes that became a mixed-land-use area as the city grew. With the unprecedented growth, Market-Mohawk became overpopulated and grew into what city officials considered a slum. In the 1950s and 1960s the area was part of the $43 million Market Mohawk Urban Renewal Project. The redevelopment brought facilities for Greyhound Lines, Franklin University, and several apartment complexes. These new buildings were placed far from the street to reduce foot traffic and were designed in Modernist or New Formalist styles, with two-dimensional facades, blank masonry facades, poured concrete decorative elements, and with none of the prior structures' architecture taken into account.

Today the district is still home to Franklin University and the Market-Mohawk apartment building, the Ohio Democratic Party Building, the Ohio Republican Party Building, and Columbus Downtown High School. There is an intact block of buildings built in the 1960s, though other buildings built nearby at that time have since been replaced. The building and district are named for the Central Market and Mohawk Public School, both of which have since been demolished.

The Market-Mohawk Center was listed on the Columbus Register of Historic Properties and the National Register of Historic Places in 2020. The brick and concrete building was built in 1970 in the New Formalist style. The period-specific building was listed as it reflects the time and trend of urban redevelopment.

=== Park Street District ===
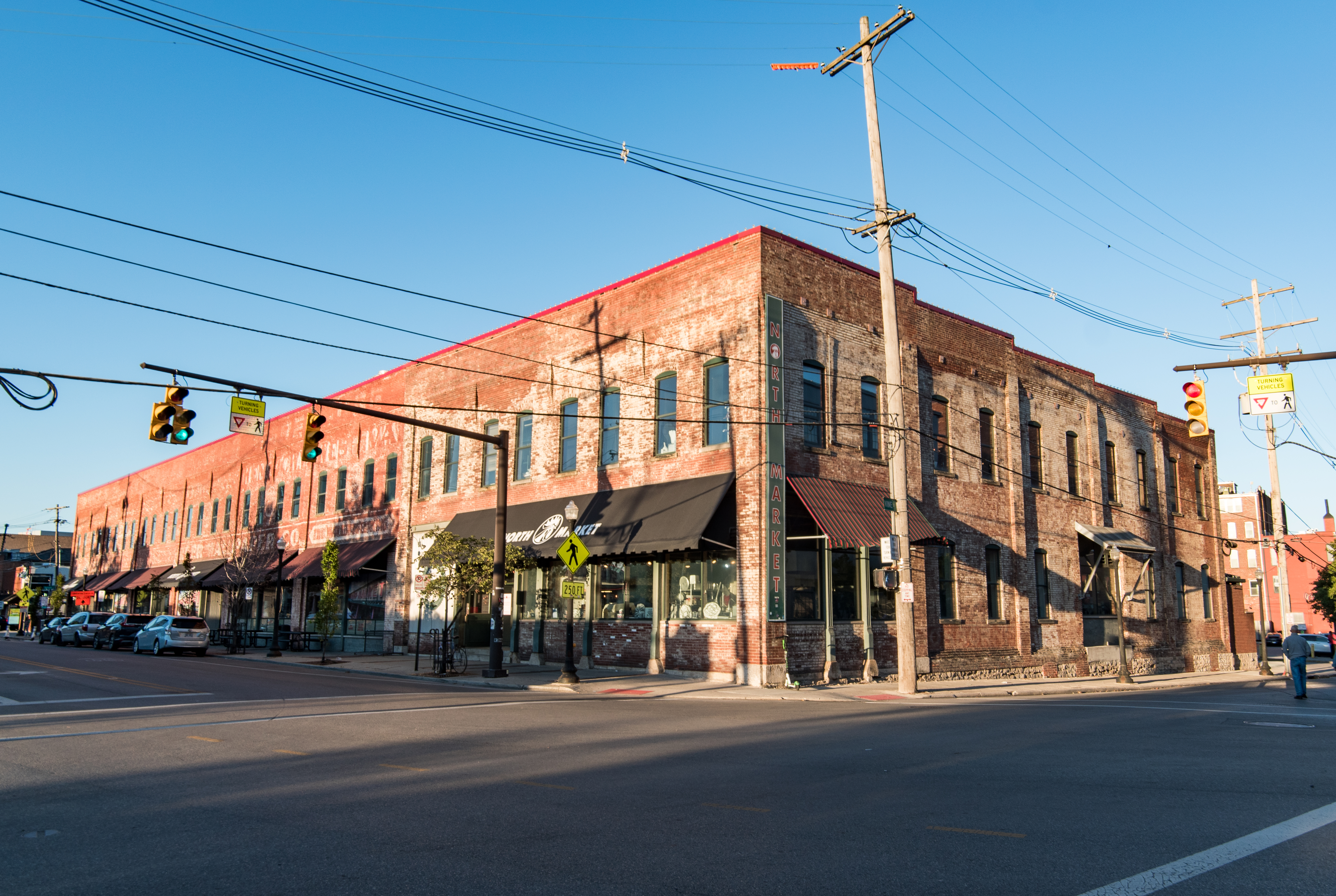
North Market

Park Street District, including the North Market Historic District, sits in the northernmost part of downtown Columbus. Sitting just north of the Arena District, it is bounded by Goodale Avenue to the north, Vine Street to the south, high street to the east, and Neil Avenue to the west. The area retains numerous physical characteristics from the early twentieth century when it served as a wholesale and manufacturing focal point just north of the Columbus Union Station. In 1980, revitalization focused on becoming an exciting area, restaurant, and entertainment center. It features North Market, the only continued market of the four originals in Columbus. Numerous restaurants and bars extend off of Park Street, as well as offices and retail options in the area. Its name is derived from the Park Street that dissects the district.

=== Fort Hayes ===
The Fort Hayes area is primarily located within the boundaries of the I-670 loop northeast of downtown, primarily along Cleveland Avenue. It was sold by Robert A. Neil and his brother William to the state in order to build a United States barracks in the then northeastern part of the city. The facility was built, and by 1875 was re-purposed to be primarily a recruiting intake and training facility. It was originally called the Columbus Barracks until 1922, when it then became Fort Hayes, named after Governor and President Rutherford B. Hayes. By 1976, the military had largely abandoned the Fort Hayes facility. The Columbus Public Schools district purchased an area of 50 acres (20 ha; 0.20 km^{2}) for $1 USD and established what is now known as the Fort Hayes Metropolitan Education Center. During the 1988–89 school year, the Fort Hayes Arts and Academic High School was created, and joined the Columbus Public Schools' excellently-rated programs. Notable buildings still present as of 2015 include Shot Tower, one of the most recognizable buildings due to its central tower, and the Fort Hayes Metropolitan Education Center, and a Columbus City Schools bus depot.

=== Civic Center ===
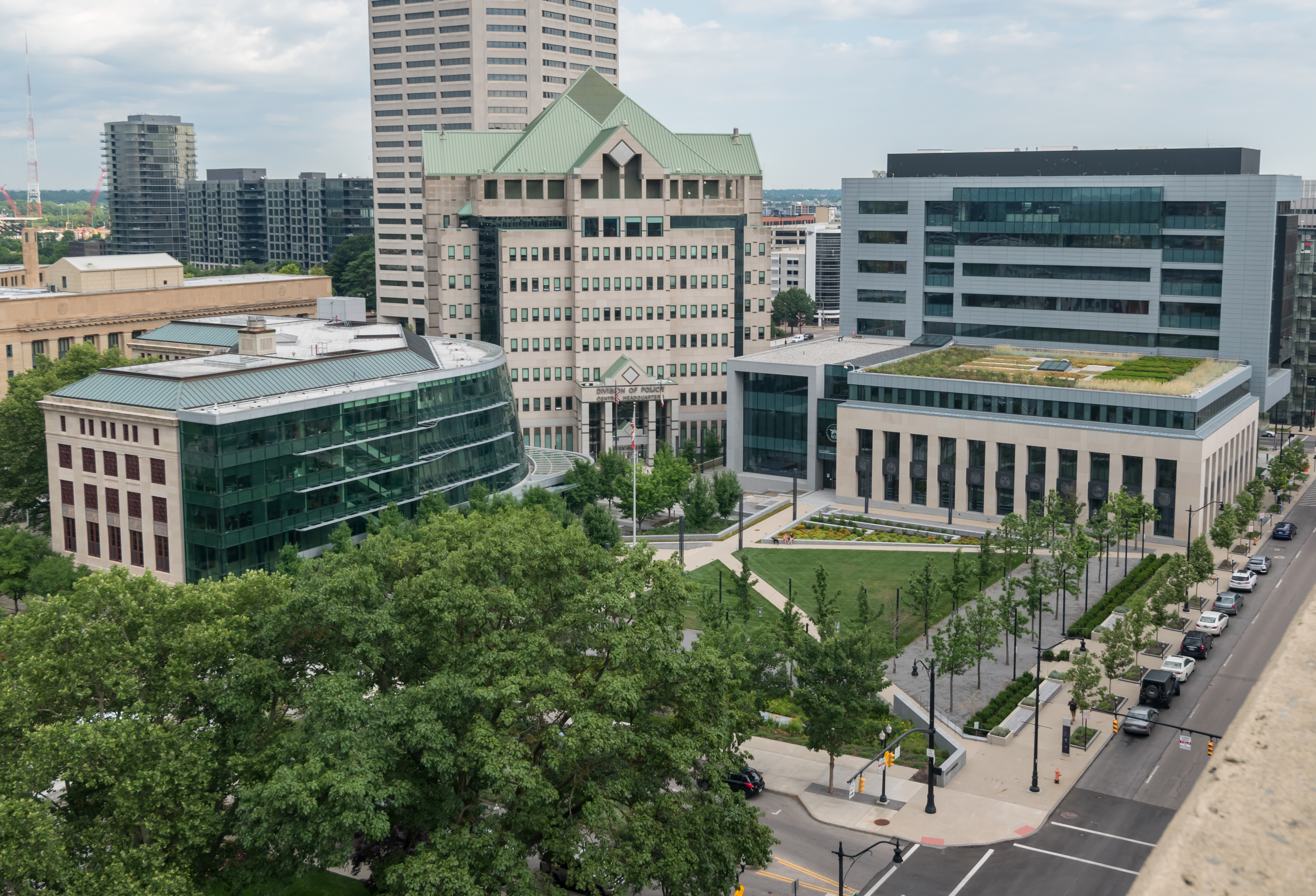
Municipal offices: 77 N. Front St., Columbus Division of Police Headquarters, and the Coleman Government Center around the City Commons park

The Civic Center is part of the central hub of the city, encapsulating the homes of the city government. It is bounded to the north by Long Street, to the south by Broad Street, the east by Front Street, and the Scioto River to the west. Home to numerous city government buildings, the unprecedented growth of Columbus lead to a much needed expansion of the cities civic center. The city began renting office spaces, and started to plan for additions to increase the multitude of work spaces. The site encompasses 5.75 acres (2.33 ha; 0.0233 km^{2}) of land in the western part of downtown. The space there is home to numerous important infrastructures, including Columbus City Hall and the headquarters of the Columbus Division of Police.

== Demographics ==
According to the 2019 estimates there are a total of 18,660 people living in the 43215 zip code (which includes the downtown area as well as East Franklinton), up 46% from the 2010 census.

== Structures and landmarks ==
=== Ohio Statehouse ===
The construction of The Ohio Statehouse began in 1839 and would end in 1861. The building was designed in the Greek-Revival style by a group of architects, the most prominent of whom was Ohio-born Nathan B. Kelley. The Statehouse was built largely using Columbus Limestone taken from the banks of the Scioto River. The Statehouse was declared a National Historic Landmark by the Secretary of the U.S. Department of Interior.

=== Ohio Judicial Center ===
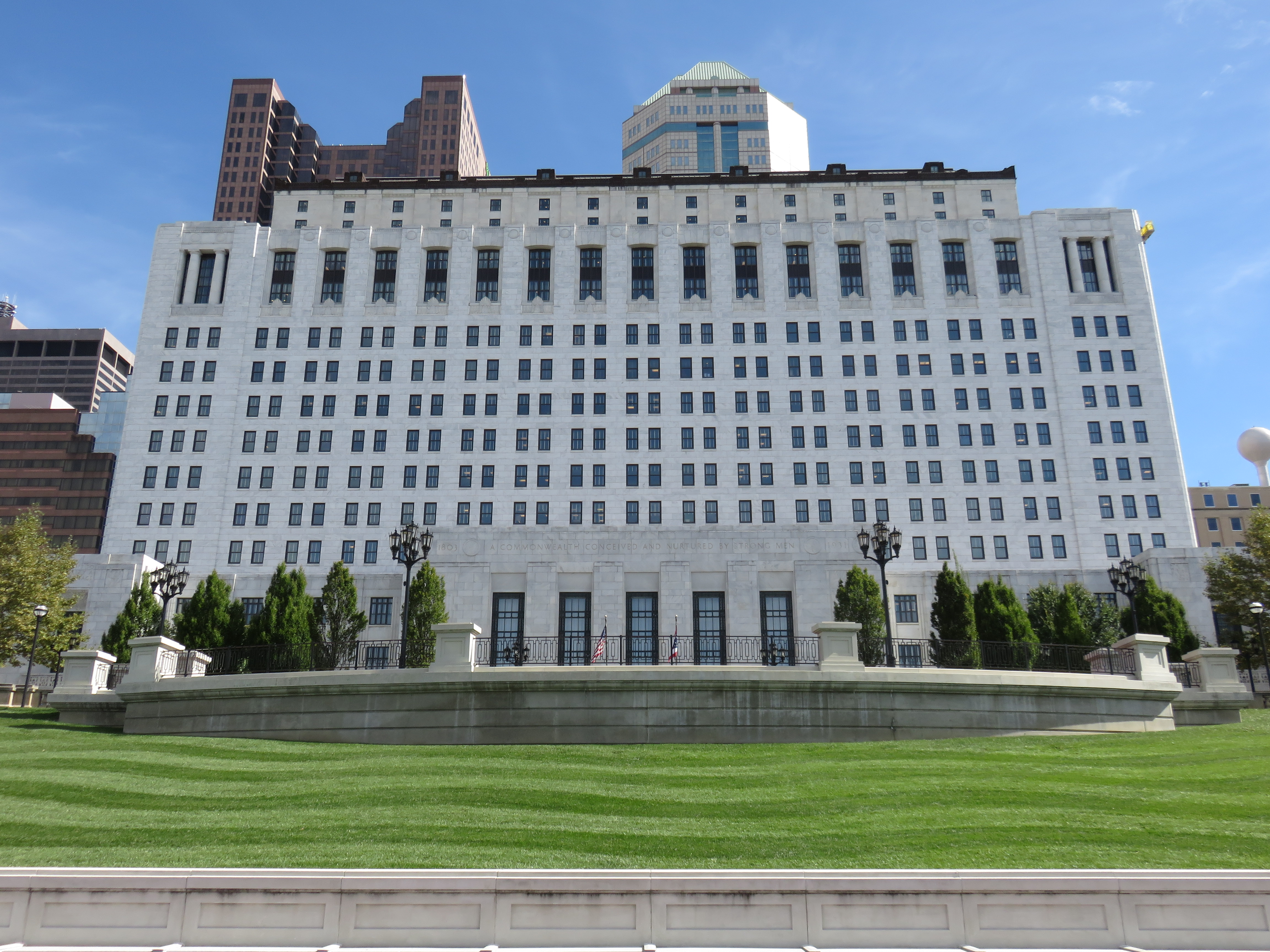
The Thomas J. Moyer Ohio Judicial Center

Now known as the Thomas J. Moyer Ohio Judicial Center, the Ohio State Office Building was built in 1933 and has housed several departments of government throughout the years. Since 2004 it has been the location of the Ohio Supreme Court. The building is located on Front Street and features several murals, bronze plaques, and statues which depict the history of Ohio.

=== Scioto Mile ===
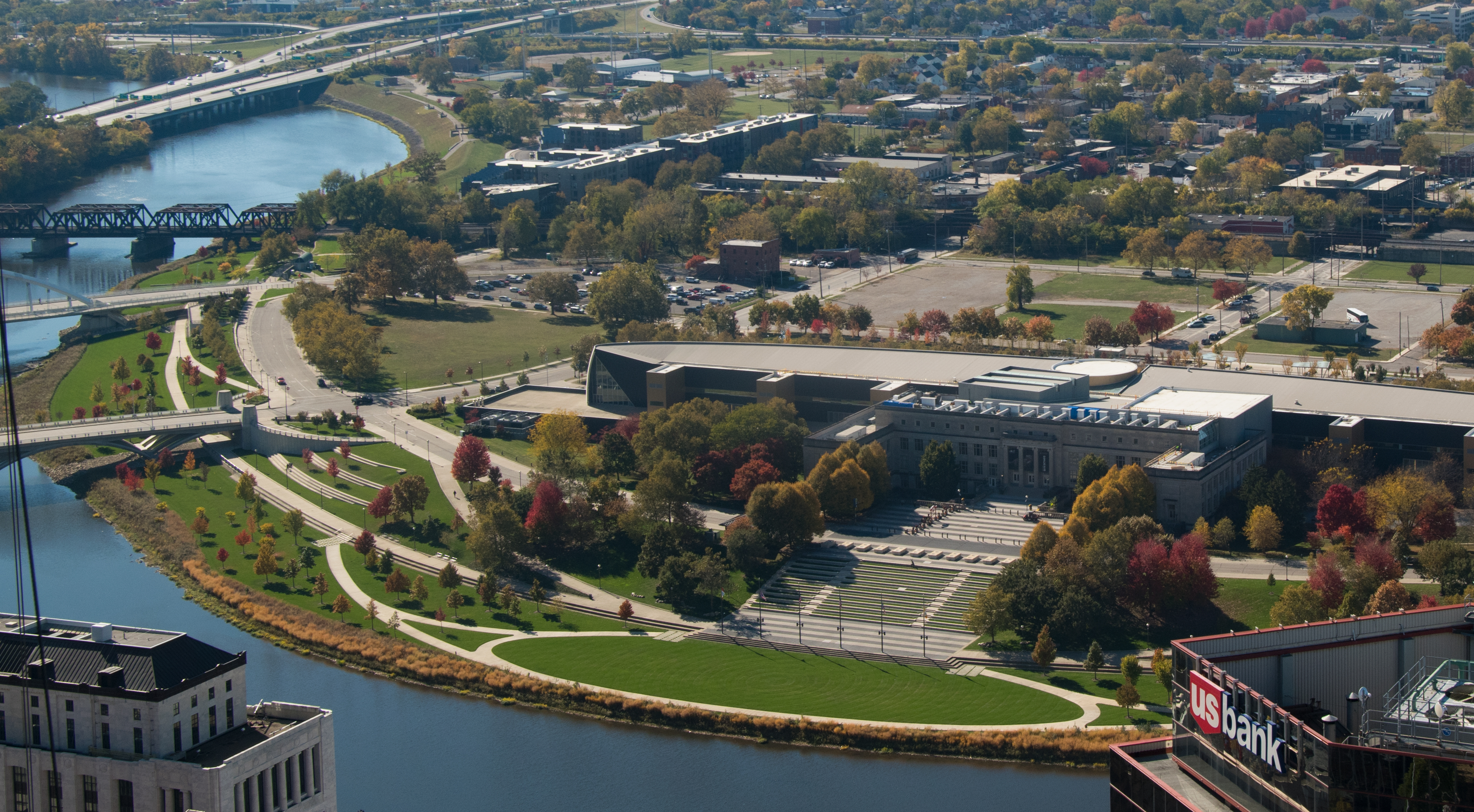
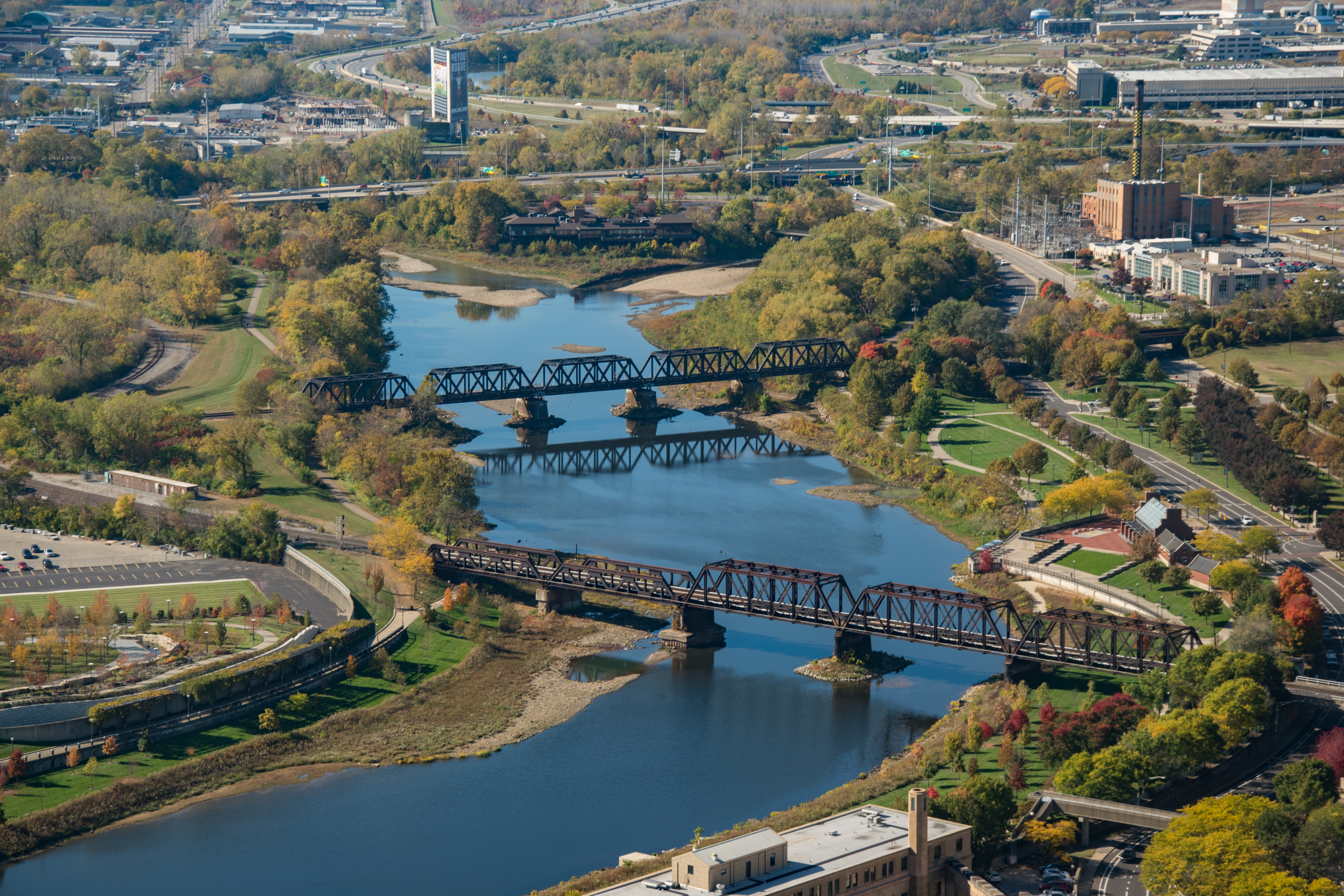
The Scioto Mile includes parks and trails along both banks of the Scioto River between downtown Columbus and Franklinton

Columbus's main riverfront parks are collectively known as the Scioto Mile. The nine parks along the Scioto River connect parts of the Scioto Greenway Trail with downtown.

The Scioto Mile's main west bank park, Genoa Park, is a 2.07 acres (0.84 ha; 0.0084 km^{2}) park located on Broad Street. Features include a riverfront amphitheater that holds events and concerts, Greenway Trail access, and a walking trail. The park is also in close proximity to the science entertainment center known as COSI. The Park opened in 1999 and is also home to the Columbus Police Memorial.

The McFerson Commons, in the Arena District, is a 2.21 acres (0.89 ha; 0.0089 km^{2}) park that was developed after the demolition of the Ohio State Penitentiary. The park is named after the Nationwide Insurance CEO from 1992 to 2000, Dimon R. McFerson. The focal point of the park is the arch that was recovered from the Columbus Union Station after its demolition in 1979.

=== Historic districts ===
Downtown Columbus has numerous historic districts, some on the National Register of Historic Places, Columbus Register of Historic Properties, and some on both or neither. These districts include the High and Gay Streets Historic District, Jefferson Avenue Historic District, North Market Historic District, South High Commercial Historic District, East Town Street Historic District, and Columbus Civic Center Historic District. Fort Hayes is also sometimes considered within downtown.

== Economy ==
There are several large businesses and organizations that operate out of downtown Columbus. Companies such as Nationwide, AEP, Huntington, and PNC all have buildings in downtown Columbus. The only mainstream daily newspaper in Columbus, The Columbus Dispatch, is headquartered in downtown Columbus on Broad Street. Along with many bars and restaurants, there are several venues that attract visitors to the downtown area, such as Nationwide Arena, Greater Columbus Convention Center, and the Lifestyle Communities Pavilion.

== Entertainment ==
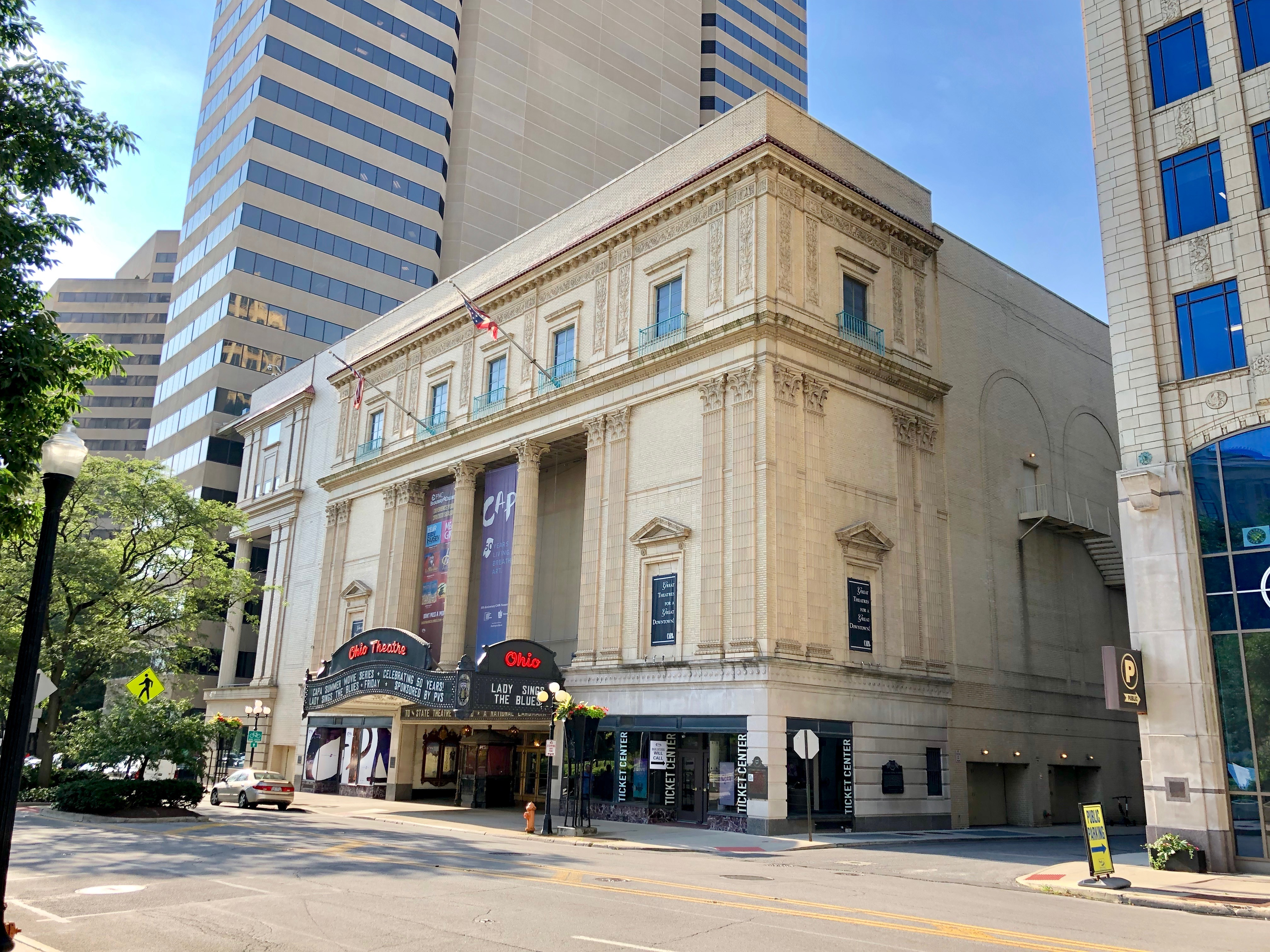
The Ohio Theatre

Downtown Columbus has a wide range of entertainment options to choose from, ranging from bars, restaurants, sporting events, concerts, and even theaters. Outside of the concert venues such as Nationwide Arena and the LC Pavilion in the Arena District, downtown Columbus is home to the Southern Theatre, the Ohio Theatre, and the Capitol Theatre. In addition to theaters, downtown Columbus has many specialty bars and clubs. A number of the restaurants and bars in the downtown area are situated around important buildings and venues all along High Street and in the surrounding area.

== Infrastructure ==
=== Transportation ===
The main form of public transportation is the Central Ohio Transit Authority (COTA) bus system. Greyhound Lines also operates the Columbus Bus Station downtown. There are taxicabs and ridesharing companies such as Lyft and Uber. There are several interstates such as Interstate 70, Interstate 71, and Interstate 670 (Ohio) that run through downtown along with State Route 315. There are also bike lanes along several streets in downtown Columbus.

=== Food access ===
Downtown Columbus lacks a major commercial grocery store. Food insecurity is high for Downtown, rated as one of five zip codes with very low food security in Columbus. The Hills Market, an independent grocery for local and organic foods, is the only grocery in Downtown Columbus.
