= List of tallest buildings in Columbus =

Skyline of Columbus
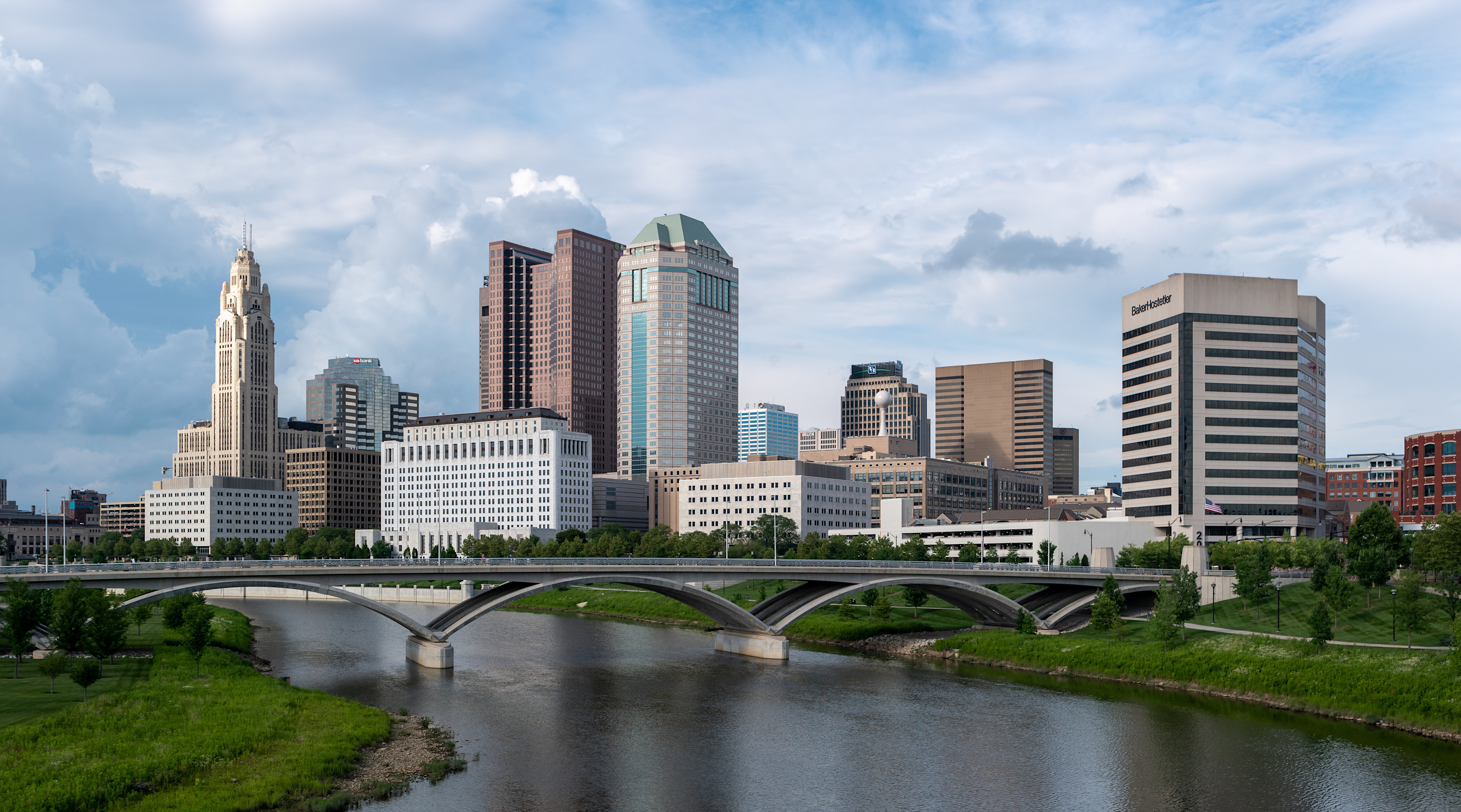
- Downtown Columbus and the Scioto Mile
- Tallest building: Rhodes State Office Tower (1973)
- Tallest building height: 624 feet (190 m)
- First 150 m+ building: LeVeque Tower (1927)

Number of tall buildings (2025)
- Taller than 100 m (328 ft): 16
- Taller than 150 m (492 ft): 5

Number of tall buildings — feet
- Taller than 200 ft (61.0 m): 38
- Taller than 300 ft (91.4 m): 19

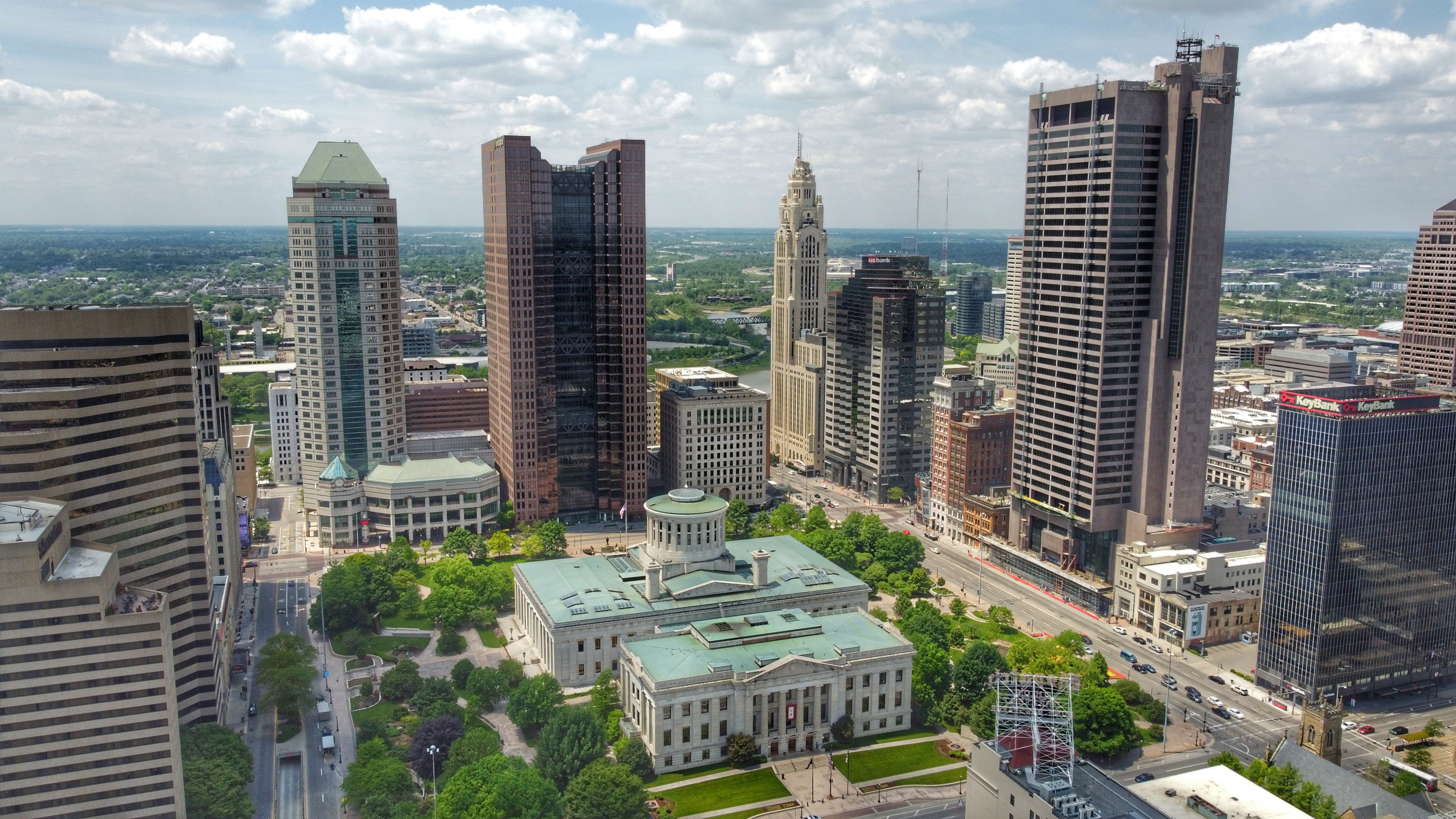
Four of the city's five tallest buildings are around Capitol Square

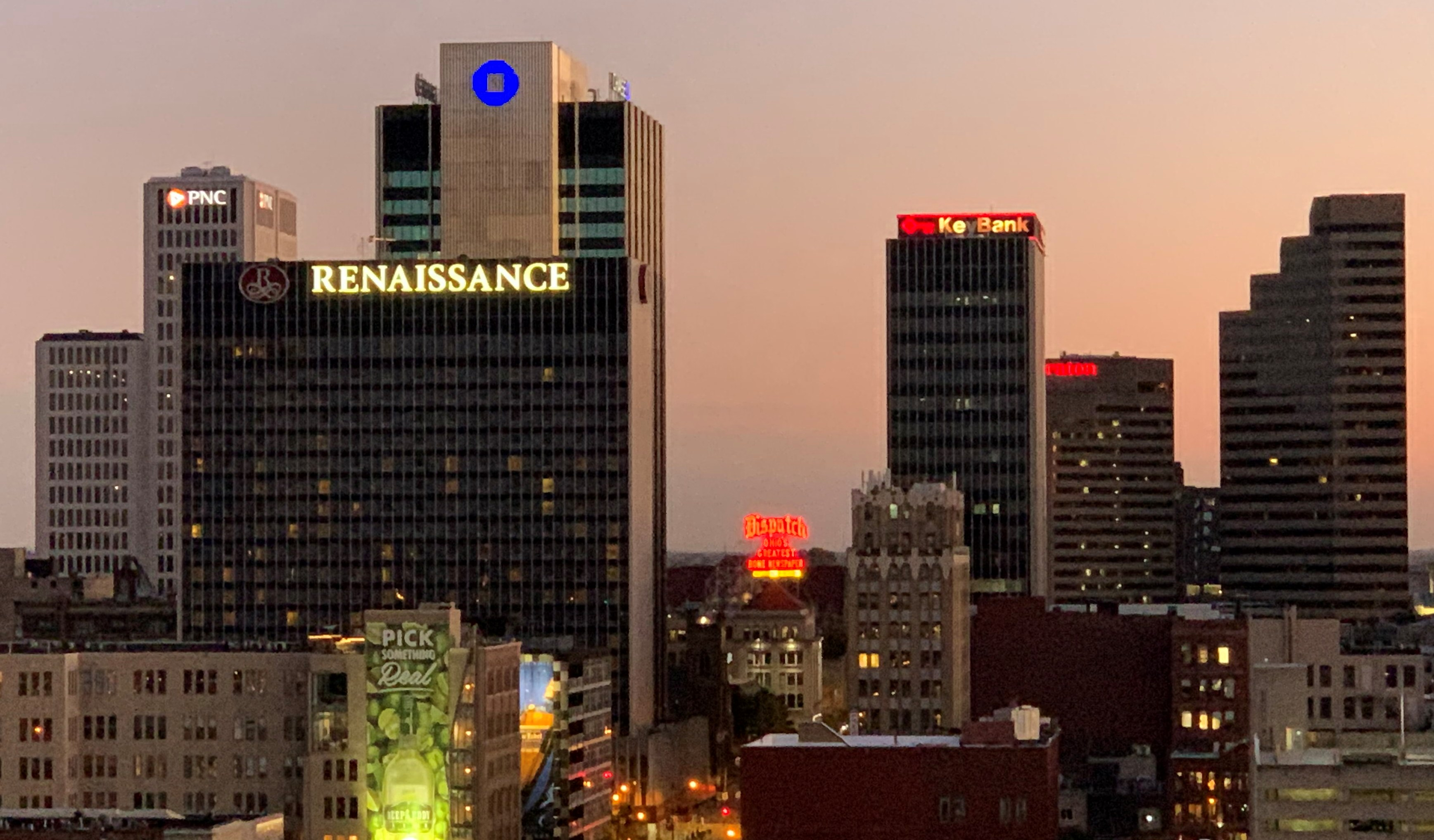
Downtown Columbus at night in 2021

Columbus, the capital and largest city of the U.S. state of Ohio, is home to 38 buildings with a height greater than 200 feet (61 m) as of 2026, the third most in any city in Ohio after Cincinnati and Cleveland. 19 of these buildings taller than 300 feet (91 m), the second most in Ohio after Cleveland, while Columbus ties Cleveland in terms of skyscrapers taller than 492 ft (150 m), with five. The tallest building in Columbus is the 629 ft (192 m), 41-story Rhodes State Office Tower, a modernist skyscraper completed in 1973. It is Ohio's fifth-tallest building. The city's second tallest building is the LeVeque Tower; this 1927 Art Deco skyscraper was the first in the state to be built on caisson foundations.

The history of skyscrapers in Columbus began in 1901 with the completion of the 13-story 16 East Broad Street, regarded as the first high-rise in the city. The city went through an early high-rise boom in the 1920s, during which the LeVeque Tower (then known as the American Insurance Union Citadel) was constructed; at its opening in 1927, it was the fifth-tallest building in the world, and tallest outside of New York City and Chicago. Known for its ornate ornamentation and terracotta facade, the LeVeque Tower rose above the rest of the city's skyline for decades, as high-rise construction came to halt after the Great Depression.

From the early 1960s to the early 1990s, Columbus witnessed a second, larger construction boom that lasted until 1991. Most of the city’s high-rises were built during this period, including the Rhodes State Building, the William Green Building, the Huntington Center, and the Vern Riffe State Office Tower. Despite strong continued population growth, the city's skyline has grown little from the 1990s onwards, and remains dominated by office buildings. Between 1990 and 2020, the tallest additions to the skyline was the Fifth Third Center in 1998 and the 314 ft (96 m) Miranova Condominiums in 2002, the city's tallest residential tower. The 2020s has seen an uptick in high-rise development; the 350 ft (107 m) Hilton Columbus Downtown Tower was completed in 2022 and work on the 382 ft (116 m) Merchant Building is anticipated to be finished by 2026.

Most high-rises in the city are located in Downtown Columbus, which lies within the Inner Belt and sits east of the Scioto River. A ring of towers, including four of the city's five tallest buildings (the exception being the William Green Building) surround Capitol Square, a public square that includes the Ohio Statehouse. Four buildings taller than 200 ft (61 m) that lie outside downtown are hospital buildings: the Nationwide Children's Hospital in Southern Orchards, the Ohio State East Hospital in King-Lincoln Bronzeville, The James Cancer Hospital and the Wexner Medical Center Inpatient Hospital, with the latter two located on the campus of Ohio State University. Also at the university are The Towers, two student dormitory high-rises.

== History ==
Number of buildings by height in Columbus by the end of each year, based on the list below. Click on the legend to toggle a specific height on or off. View chart definition.

== Cityscape ==
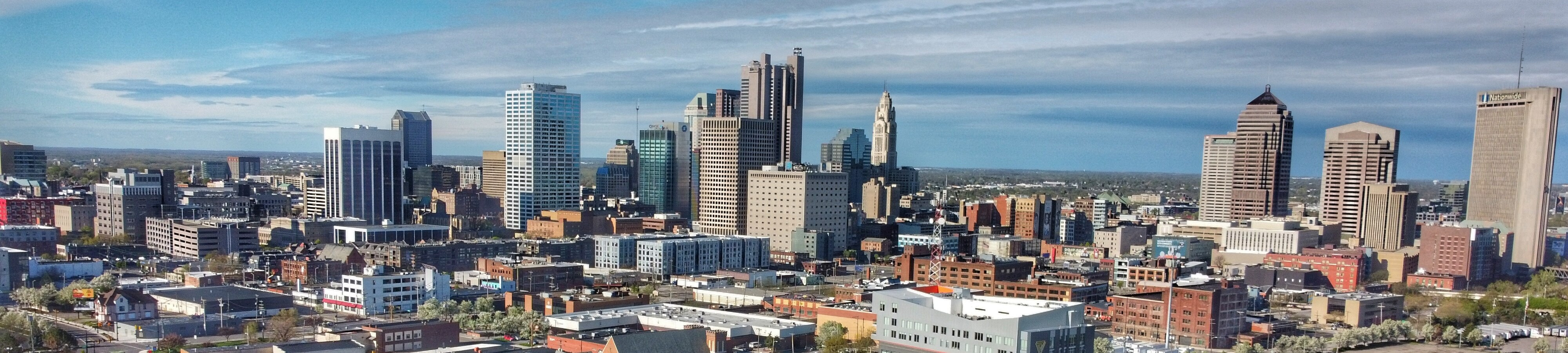
Skyline of Columbus in 2021, looking west from the Discovery District (Click or hover over image to identify buildings)

== Map of tallest buildings ==
The maps below show the location of buildings taller than 200 ft (61 m) in Downtown Columbus. Each marker is numbered by the building's height rank, and colored by the decade of its completion.

Buildings taller than 200 ft (61 m) in Downtown Columbus. An asterisk (*) next to the building's name indicates it is located outside the map.
- 1950s and before
- 1960s
- 1970s
- 1980s
- 1990s
- 2000s
- 2010s
- 2020s
1 Rhodes State Office Tower
2 LeVeque Tower
3 William Green Building
4 Huntington Center
5 Vern Riffe State Office Tower
6 One Nationwide Plaza
7 Franklin County Courthouse
8 AEP Building
9 Borden Building
10 Three Nationwide Plaza
11 One Columbus Center
12 Chase Tower
13 Capitol Square
14 Hilton Columbus Downtown Tower
15 Continental Center
16 Preston Centre
17 Miranova Condominiums
18 Fifth Third Center
19 The James Cancer Hospital*
20 Franklin County Municipal Court
21 Motorists Mutual Building
22 Midland Building
23 The Condominiums at North Bank Park
24 Lincoln Tower Dormitory*
25 Morrill Tower Dormitory*
26 Hyatt Regency Columbus
27 Key Bank Building
28 Renaissance Columbus Downtown Hotel
29 Sheraton Columbus Hotel at Capitol Square
30 280 Plaza
31 OPERS Building Addition
32 Nationwide Children's Hospital Patient Tower
33 Columbia Gas of Ohio Building
34 8 East Broad Street
35 Ohio Police & Fire Pension Fund Building
36 Waterford Tower
37 University Hospitals East*

== Tallest buildings ==
This list ranks completed buildings in Columbus that stand at least 200 ft (61 m) tall as of 2026, based on standard height measurement. This includes spires and architectural details but does not include antenna masts. The “Year” column indicates the year of completion. Buildings tied in height are sorted by year of completion with earlier buildings ranked first, and then alphabetically.

Was the tallest building in Columbus upon completion

Rank	Name	Image	Location	Height ft (m)	Floors	Year	Purpose	Notes
1	Rhodes State Office Tower		30 East Broad Street 39°57′46″N 82°59′58″W	624 (190.2)	41	1973	Office	The 5th-tallest building in Ohio and the tallest building completed in Columbus in the 1970s. It is the tallest office building in Columbus and the tallest mid-block building in Ohio.
2	LeVeque Tower		50 West Broad Street 39°57′44″N 83°00′08″W	555 (169.3)	47	1927	Office	7th-tallest building in Ohio. Tallest building in Columbus for 46 years, from 1927 to 1973. Tallest building completed in Columbus in the 1920s. Briefly the tallest building in the United States outside of New York City and Chicago until 1928.
3	William Green Building		30 West Spring Street 39°58′00″N 83°00′09″W	530 (161.6)	33	1990	Office	8th-tallest building in Ohio. Tallest building completed in Columbus in the 1990s.
4	Huntington Center		41 South High Street 39°57′40″N 83°00′03″W	512 (156.1)	37	1983	Office	10th-tallest building in Ohio. Tallest building completed in Columbus in the 1980s.
5	Vern Riffe State Office Tower		77 South High Street 39°57′37″N 83°00′04″W	504 (153.5)	33	1989	Office	
6	One Nationwide Plaza		1 West Nationwide Boulevard 39°58′06″N 83°00′09″W	485 (147.8)	40	1978	Office	The 13th-tallest building in Ohio.
7	Franklin County Courthouse		373 South High Street 39°57′14″N 83°00′01″W	464 (141.4)	27	1991	Government	Tallest government building in Columbus.
8	AEP Building		1 Riverside Plaza 39°57′54″N 83°00′20″W	456 (139)	31	1983	Office	
9	Borden Building		180 East Broad Street 39°57′48″N 82°59′45″W	438 (133.5)	34	1974	Office	Also known as Continental Plaza.
10	Wexner Medical Center Inpatient Hospital		520 W. 10th Ave 39°59′43″N 83°01′09″W	411 (125)	26	2026	Health	Tallest building outside of downtown, as well as tallest building constructed in the city since the 1990s.
11	Three Nationwide Plaza		230 N Front St 39°58′02″N 83°00′11″W	408 (124.4)	26	1988	Office	
12	One Columbus Center		10 West Broad Street 39°57′45″N 83°00′05″W	366 (111.6)	26	1987	Office	
13	Chase Tower		100 East Broad Street 39°57′47″N 82°59′52″W	357 (108.8)	25	1965	Office	Formerly known as Bank One Tower and the Columbus Center. Tallest building completed in Columbus in the 1960s.
14	Capitol Square		65 East State Street 39°57′36″N 82°59′54″W	350 (106.7)	26	1984	Office	
15	Hilton Columbus Downtown Tower		402 North High Street 39°58′14″N 83°00′07″W	350 (106.7)	27	2022	Hotel	Tallest building completed in Columbus in the 2020s.
16	Continental Center		150 East Gay Street 39°57′52″N 82°59′50″W	348 (106.1)	26	1973	Office	
17	Preston Centre		155 East Broad Street 39°57′44″N 82°59′48″W	317 (96.6)	24	1977	Office	Formerly known as the PNC Bank Building from 1977 to 2024.
18	Miranova Condominiums		1 Miranova Place 39°57′18″N 83°00′19″W	314 (95.7)	26	2000	Residential	Tallest building completed in Columbus in the 2000s. Tallest residential building in Columbus.
19	Fifth Third Center		21 East State Street 39°57′36″N 83°00′00″W	302 (92.1)	21	1998	Office	
20	The James Cancer Hospital		460 West 10th Avenue 39°59′42″N 83°01′11″W	297 (91)	21	2014	Health	Tallest building completed in Columbus in the 2010s.
21	Franklin County Municipal Court		375 South High Street 39°57′13″N 82°59′58″W	288 (87.8)	19	1979	Government	
22	Motorists Mutual Building		471 East Broad Street 39°57′47″N 82°59′16″W	286 (87.2)	21	1973	Office	
23	Midland Building		250 East Broad Street 39°57′48″N 82°59′38″W	280 (85.4)	21	1970	Office	
24	The Condominiums at North Bank Park		300 West Spring Street 39°57′58″N 83°00′37″W	267 (81.4)	20	2007	Residential	Second tallest residential building in Columbus.
25	Lincoln Tower Dormitory		1800 Cannon Drive 39°59′55″N 83°01′20″W	260 (79.3)	24	1967	Residential	
25	Morrill Tower Dormitory		1900 Cannon Drive 40°00′00″N 83°01′19″W	260 (79.3)	24	1967	Residential	
27	Hyatt Regency Columbus		350 North High Street 39°58′11″N 83°00′05″W	256 (78)	20	1980	Hotel	
28	Key Bank Building		88 East Broad Street 39°57′46″N 82°59′54″W	253 (77)	20	1963	Office	
29	Renaissance Columbus Downtown Hotel		50 North 3rd Street 39°57′50″N 82°59′52″W	250 (76.2)	22	1963	Hotel	Opened as the Columbus Plaza Hotel in 1963. Became a Sheraton hotel in 1965, and operated until 1987, after which the building remained dormant until it re-opened as an Adam's Mark hotel in 1997. Converted into a Marriot Renaissance hotel in 2006.
30	Sheraton Columbus Hotel at Capitol Square		75 East State Street 39°57′36″N 82°59′52″W	249 (75.8)	21	1984	Hotel	
31	280 Plaza		280 North High Street 39°58′05″N 83°00′04″W	242 (73.8)	18	1982	Office	Also known as Two Nationwide Plaza.
32	OPERS Building Addition		277 East Town Street 39°57′32″N 82°59′32″W	242 (74) (Note: Sources do not state the exact height of this building. This figure was determined using Google Earth by subtracting the altitude of the building's lowest main pedestrian open-air entrance from its highest architectural point.)	13	2004	Office	Headquarters of the Ohio Public Employees Retirement System.
33	Nationwide Children's Hospital Patient Tower		650 Children's Drive 39°57′10″N 82°58′51″W	234 (71)	12	2012	Health	
34	Columbia Gas of Ohio Building		200 South Civic Center Drive 39°57′26″N 83°00′10″W	213 (65)	15	1983	Office	
35	8 East Broad Street		8 East Broad Street 39°57′45″N 83°00′01″W	212 (65)	17	1906	Mixed-use	Tallest building in Columbus from 1906 to 1927. Tallest building completed in Columbus in the 1900s. Located adjacent to 16 East Broad Street, the previous tallest building in the city. Formally known as the Capitol Trust Building and the State Savings & Trust Building. Originally an office building, it was partially converted to residential use in 2008.
36	Ohio Police & Fire Pension Fund Building		140 East Town Street 39°57′35″N 82°59′46″W	207 (63)	17	1974	Office	Also known as Town Center or 140 East Town Street.
37	Waterford Tower		155 West Main Street 39°57′19″N 83°00′14″W	205 (62)	19	1988	Residential	Constructed near the historical site of the junction of the Columbus Feeder Canal and Scioto River. Waterford Tower was the first high-rise, high-density residential building built downtown in 15 years.
38	University Hospitals East		1450 Hawthorne Avenue 39°58′14″N 82°57′44″W	202 (62)	16	1970	Health	

== Tallest under construction ==
There are two buildings under construction in Columbus that are planned to be at least 200 feet (61 m) tall as of 2026, based on standard height measurement.

Name	Image	Height ft (m)	Floors	Year of completion	Notes
Merchant Building		382 (116)	32	2026	Topped-off
Nationwide Children's Hospital expansion	—	240+ (73+)	14	2028	

== Tallest buildings in the Columbus metropolitan area ==
There is one buildings taller than 200 ft (61 m) in the Columbus metropolitan area that are located outside of the city of Columbus.

Rank	Name	Image	City	Height ft (m)	Floors	Year	Purpose	Notes
1	Summit Chase Condominiums	—	Grandview Heights 39°58′39″N 83°02′58″W	81.7 (25)	22	1966	Residential	Designed by E.A. Glendening & Associates, Summit Chase Received an AIA Honor Award in 1967. The building was the former home to astronaut and U.S. Senator John Glenn.

== Timeline of tallest buildings ==
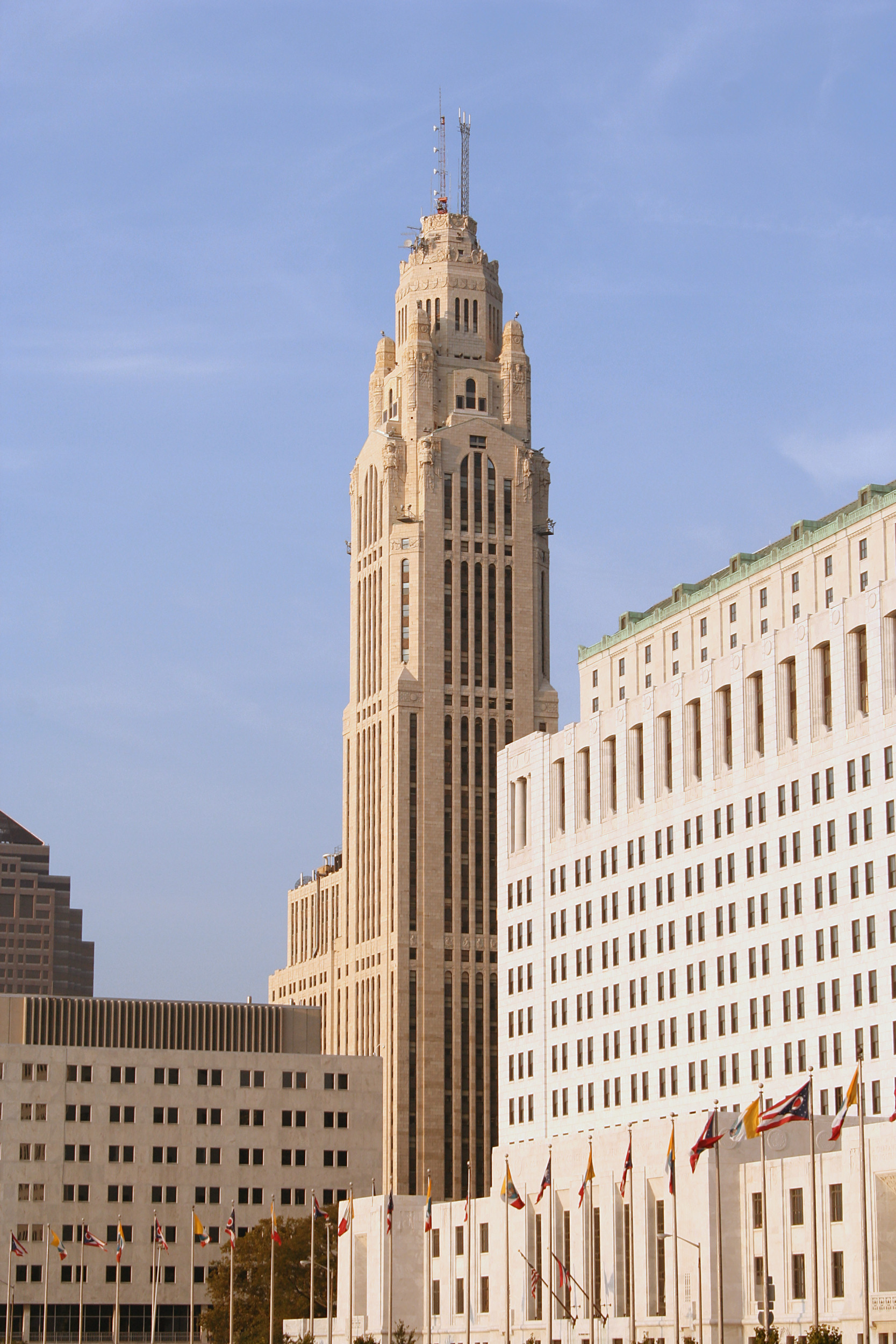
The LeVeque Tower was the tallest building in Columbus from 1927 to 1973.

This lists buildings that once held the title of tallest building in Columbus.

Name	Image	Street address	Years as tallest	Height ft (m)	Floors	Reference
Ohio Statehouse		1 Capitol Square	1857–1901	158 (48)	4	
New Hayden Building		16 East Broad Street	1901–1906	180 (55)	13	
Capitol Trust Building		8 East Broad Street	1906–1927	212 (65)	17	
LeVeque Tower		50 West Broad Street	1927–1973	555 (169)	47	
Rhodes State Office Tower		30 East Broad Street	1973–present	629 (192)	41	

== See also ==
- Architecture of Columbus, Ohio
- List of tallest buildings in Ohio
- List of tallest buildings in Akron
- List of tallest buildings in Cincinnati
- List of tallest buildings in Cleveland
- List of tallest buildings in Dayton
- List of tallest buildings in Toledo, Ohio
