= Preston Centre =

Skyscraper in Columbus, Ohio

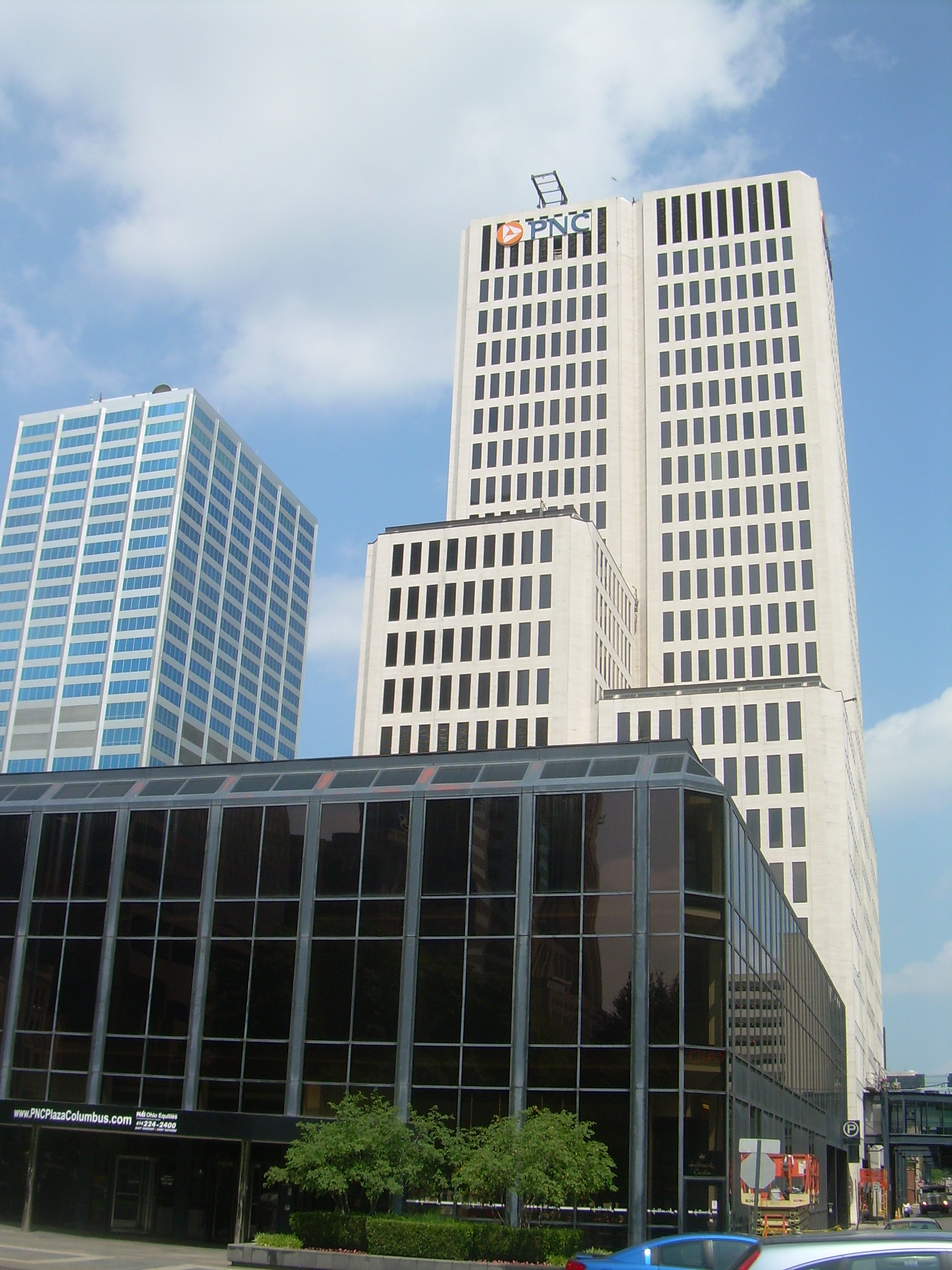
- Interactive map of the Preston Centre area
- Former names: PNC Bank Building

General information
- Type: Offices
- Architectural style: Modernist, Brutalist
- Location: 155 East Broad Street, Columbus, Ohio
- Coordinates: 39°57′44″N 82°59′48″W
- Named for: The Edwards Companies
- Topped-out: 1977
- Completed: Mid-1977
- Owner: PNC
- Landlord: PNC

Height
- Height: 317 ft (97 m)

Technical details
- Material: Steel, granite, concrete foundation
- Floor count: 24
- Floor area: 358,643 sq ft (33,319.0 m^{2})

Design and construction
- Architect: Skidmore, Owings & Merrill

Website
- das.ohio.gov/property-services/properties-and-facilities/facility-information-0/rhodes

The Preston Centre is a 27-story, 317-foot (97 m) office building and skyscraper on Capitol Square in Downtown Columbus, Ohio. The Preston Centre is the 15th-tallest building in Columbus. The tower is named for Preston Wolfe, a former worker there. It is diagonally adjacent to the Borden Building.

The Preston Centre was designed by Skidmore, Owings and Merrill in a Modernist style. Construction was complete in 1977; it was owned by PNC until 2024, when the building was converted into condominiums.

== Attributes ==
The Preston Centre is located near Capitol Square in Downtown Columbus, on East Broad Street. It is the fifteenth-tallest building in Columbus, measuring 317 feet (97 m) tall. It is also one of the tallest apartments in Columbus. The building faces the Ohio Statehouse, the state capitol building, located to its east.

From its completion to 2024, the building was owned by PNC, a bank. In February 2024, ownership of the building was transferred to The Edwards Companies. The building was renovated and turned into 105 luxury apartments.

== Plaza ==
A small plaza was built next to the building, and is still there as of 2024.

== Exterior ==
The Preston Centre was designed by Skidmore, Owings and Merrill. The skyscraper was designed in a Modernist style, sometimes characterized as Brutalist, featuring the style's characteristic heavy rectilinear masonry.

The building is stepped, and the east and west walls are completely vertical with no breaks. The windows are separated by heavy concrete, and are consistent on every wall. The building is made up of "chunks", similar to the Willis Tower, and utilizes the tube system.

== See also ==
- Architecture of Columbus, Ohio
- Willis Tower, another skyscraper with a similar shape
- List of tallest buildings in Columbus, Ohio
