= Three Nationwide Plaza =

Postmodern highrise building in Columbus Ohio

Coordinates: 39.9672°N 83.0029°W

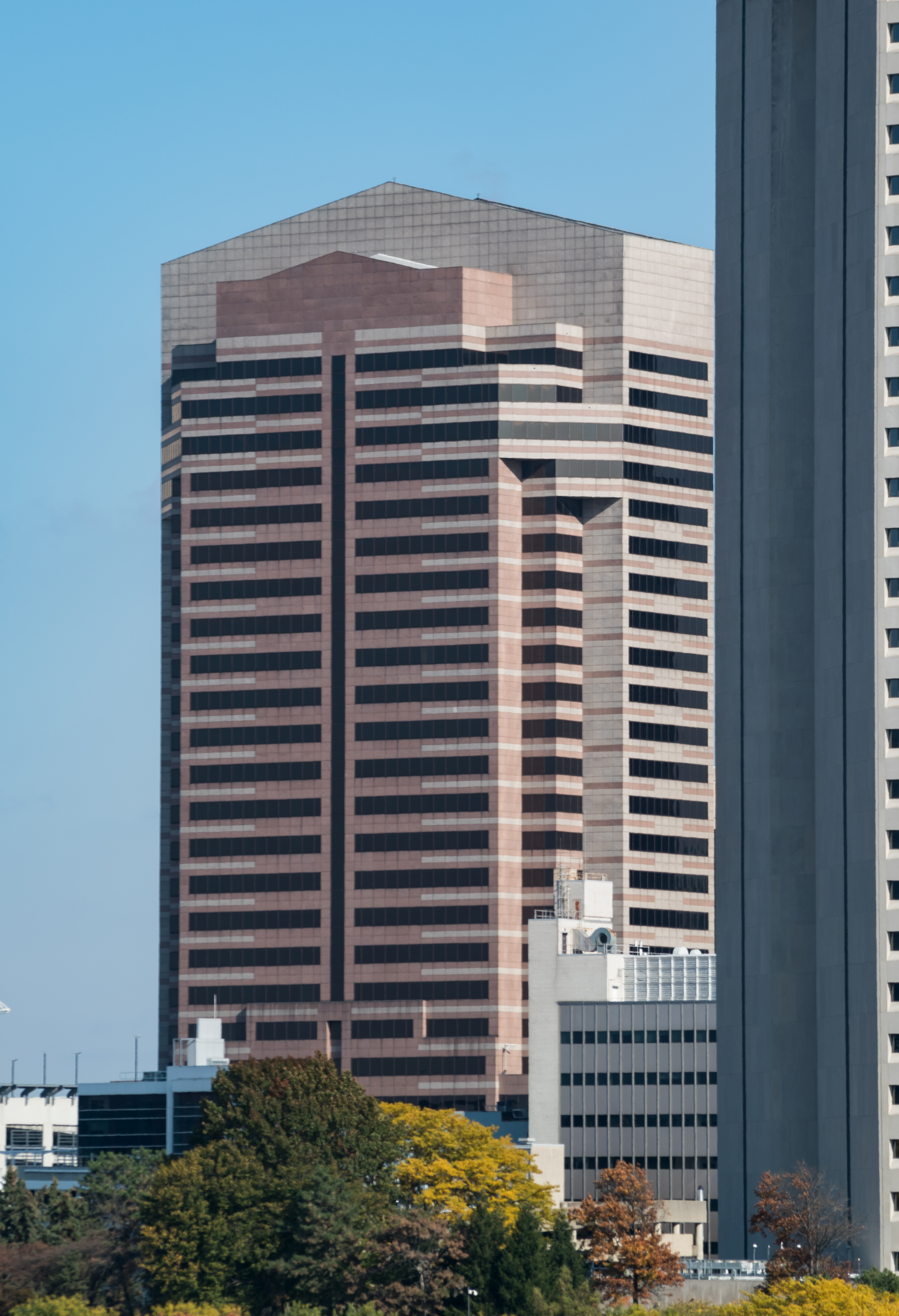
- Interactive map of the Three Nationwide Plaza area

General information
- Type: Office
- Location: 3 Nationwide Plaza, Columbus, Ohio
- Construction started: 1987; 39 years ago
- Completed: 1988; 38 years ago

Height
- Roof: 408 ft (124 m)

Technical details
- Floor count: 27 above ground 3 below ground
- Floor area: 922,995 sq ft (85,749.0 m^{2})

Design and construction
- Architect: NBBJ Group
- Structural engineer: Korda/Nemeth Engineering, Inc.
- Main contractor: Turner Construction Co.

Other information
- Parking: 178

Three Nationwide Plaza is a 408 ft (124 m) postmodern highrise building located at the address 3 Nationwide Plaza in Downtown Columbus, Ohio. The building is part of the larger multi-building complex known as Nationwide Plaza. Nationwide Plaza is the headquarters of Nationwide Mutual Insurance Company. Three Nationwide Plaza is the 10th tallest building in Columbus. Construction on the building finished in December 1988. The architect responsible was the NBBJ Group and the building design follows a postmodern style. The building was constructed for approximately $89 million and the main materials used were glass, steel, and precast concrete panels.

The buildings that make up Nationwide Plaza are:

- One Nationwide Plaza, completed in 1977
- 280 Plaza (also known as Two Nationwide), completed in 1981
- Three Nationwide Plaza, completed in 1988
- Four Nationwide Plaza, completed in 2000

== See also ==
- List of tallest buildings in Columbus, Ohio
