= Vern Riffe State Office Tower =

Skyscraper on Capitol Square in downtown Columbus, Ohio

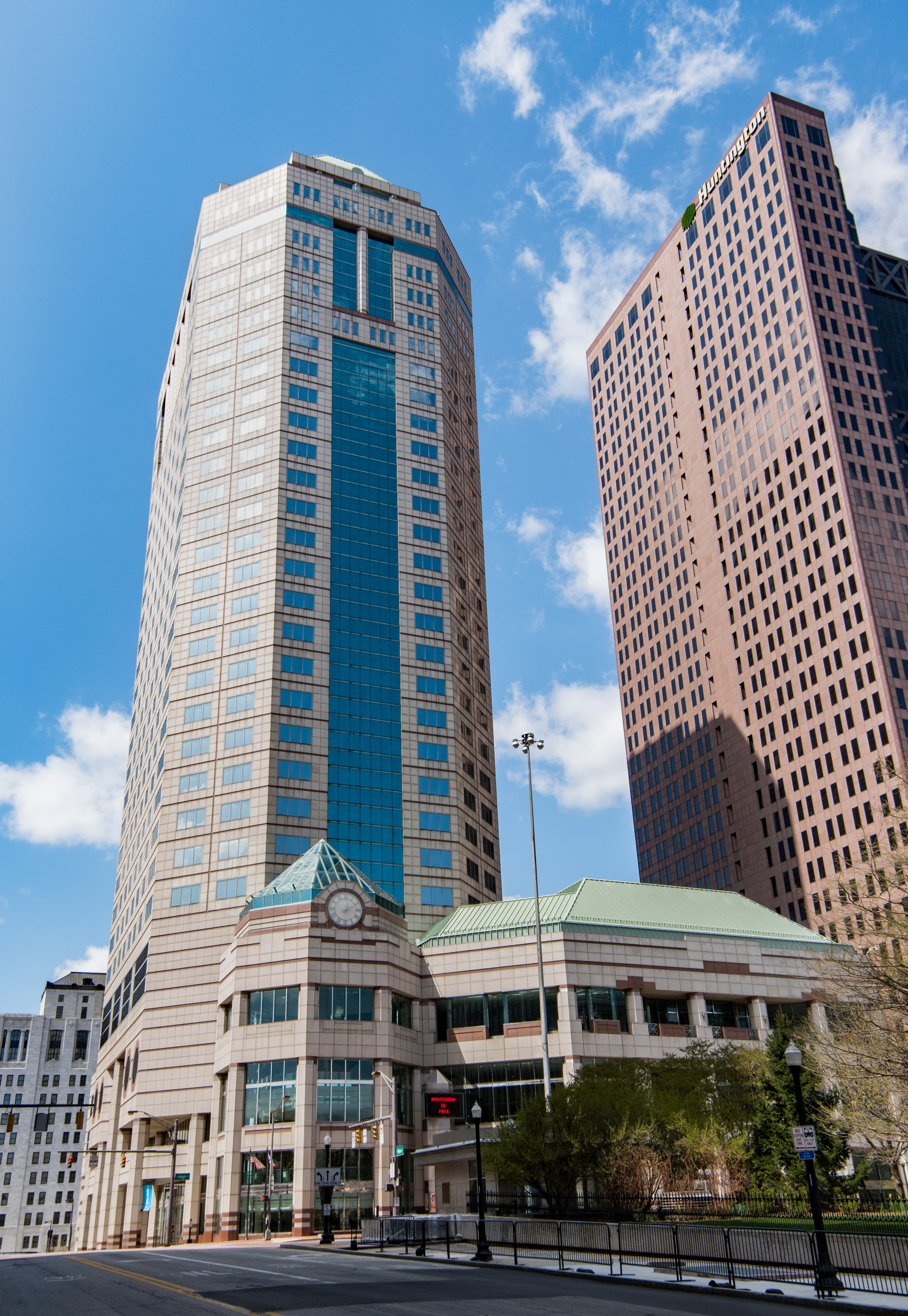
- Interactive map of the Vern Riffe State Office Tower area
- Etymology: Vern Riffe

General information
- Type: Office
- Location: 77 South High Street, Columbus, Ohio
- Coordinates: 39°57′37″N 83°00′03″W
- Completed: 1988; 38 years ago

Height
- Roof: 503 ft (153 m)

Technical details
- Floor count: 32
- Floor area: 102,192 m^{2} (1,099,990 sq ft)

Design and construction
- Architect: NBBJ

Website
- das.ohio.gov/Divisions/General-Services/Properties-and-Facilities/Riffe

The Vern Riffe State Office Tower is a 503 ft-tall (153 m) skyscraper on Capitol Square in downtown Columbus, Ohio. It was completed in 1988 and has 32 floors. NBBJ designed the building, which is the fifth-tallest in Columbus, and has 102,192 m^{2} of floor area. An earlier concept for the site, also designed by NBBJ, would have included a site to the west of the present location, and would have effectively closed off South Wall Street north of West State Street. The building was named for Vernal G. Riffe, Jr, who served as Speaker of the Ohio House of Representatives from 1975 to 1994. The complex also contains the 854-seat Capitol Theatre.

The project was completed for $130 million.

The working office of Ohio Governor Mike DeWine is located on the building's 30th floor.

In 2023, several Republican members of Ohio's House of Representatives proposed renaming the Vern Riffe Center, removing the Democratic House speaker's name from the building. The proposal would rename the structure in honor of Tawnya Salyer, who lost her footing while helping construct the building in 1988 and died from the fall. This bill did not pass.

== See also ==
- List of tallest buildings in Columbus, Ohio
