= Hilton Columbus Downtown =

High-rise hotel in Columbus, Ohio

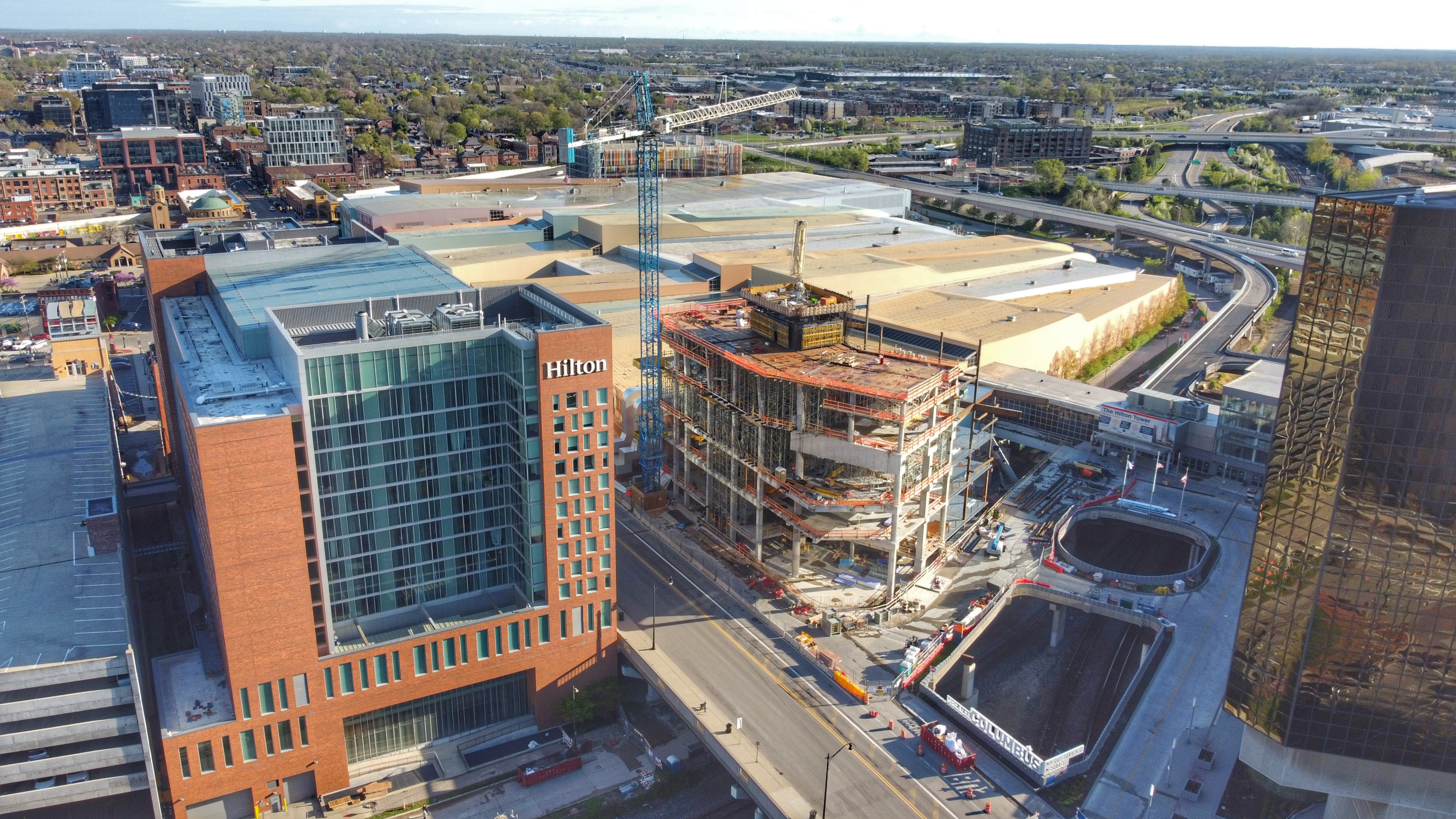
- Hotel beside its new tower under construction, April 2021
- Interactive map of the Hilton Columbus Downtown area
- Hotel chain: Hilton Hotels & Resorts

General information
- Location: 402 N. High Street, Columbus, Ohio
- Coordinates: 39.970802°N 83.002755°W
- Completed: 2012 (tower in 2022)
- Owner: Franklin County Convention Facilities Authority

Height
- Height: 361 ft (110 m)

Technical details
- Floor count: 28

Design and construction
- Architects: HOK, Moody Nolan, Cooper Carry, Meyers + Associates Architecture

Other information
- Number of rooms: 1,000
- Public transit access: 1, 2, 5, 9, 75, 102, AirConnect

Website
- hiltoncolumbusdowntown.com

The Hilton Columbus Downtown is a high-rise hotel in Columbus, Ohio. The Hilton hotel includes two buildings, one west of High Street, which opened in 2012, and a new tower east of High Street, which opened in September 2022. The tower addition gives the hotel a total of 1,000 guest rooms, making it the largest hotel in Ohio.

== Attributes ==
The hotel sits at a cross-section between the city's busiest neighborhoods: Downtown, the Short North, and the Arena District. The hotel is owned by the Franklin County Convention Facilities Authority, which also owns the adjoining Greater Columbus Convention Center.

The hotel is the largest in Ohio, with 1,000 rooms, since completion of its tower. The tower connects to the older portion of the hotel by a sky bridge. The new building includes several restaurants, bars, and 463 guest rooms. The main restaurant, called FYR, has two stories, featuring live-fire cooking and local products. It is joined by a lobby bar, Spark, a rooftop lounge, Stories on High, and a grab & go market. It also includes a 15,000-square-foot (1,400 m^{2}) ballroom. The rooftop bar is the highest-up of any in the city.

=== Architecture ===
The first Hilton building, completed in 2012, has a brick-and-glass facade to integrate with the surrounding neighborhood and connects to the convention center through a skywalk. It was designed by HOK and Moody Nolan.

The second Hilton building, completed in 2022, has a terra cotta cladding and high-performance glass to integrate with the first building and provide energy efficiency. The use of glass allows for ample natural light in public and event spaces. The building was designed by Cooper Carry and Meyers + Associates Architecture with interiors by Jeffrey Beers International.

== History ==
In 2008, Experience Columbus, the convention and visitors bureau, began to recognize that the city was at a competitive disadvantage due to the lack of hotel rooms which put the city at danger of losing new and old business at the Greater Columbus Convention Center. In 2010, ground was broken for the publicly financed, 532-room Hilton Columbus Downtown to help meet the growing demand for events at the convention center. It opened in 2012 with a 250-piece art collection, with a cost of about $2 million. The artwork features Ohio-based artists, including Queen Brooks, Ann Hamilton, Aminah Robinson, George Bellows, Emerson Burkhart, Milton Caniff, Alice Schille and James Thurber. The hotel underwent a $125 million renovation in 2015.

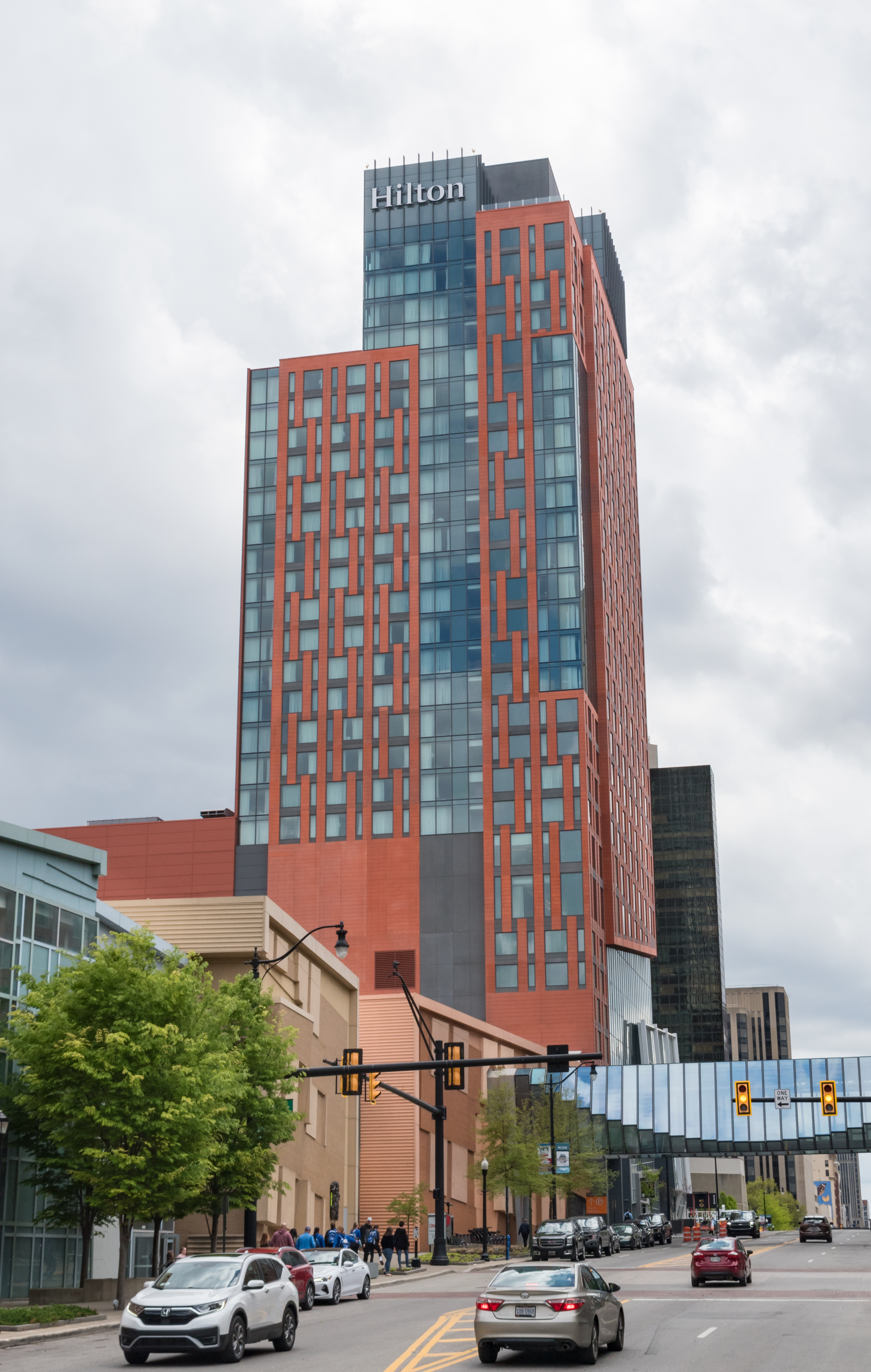
Tower portion of the hotel

A new 1,000-room hotel was first proposed in 2015 by Experience Columbus. In 2016, Columbus bid on hosting Democratic and Republican National Conventions, losing both. In 2017, the organization commissioned a "Hotel and Development Study" and found the city has fewer hotel rooms within a 10-minute walk of the convention center than other locations. The survey recommended the expansion of the Hyatt Regency or the Hilton Columbus Downtown to meet the need of a 1,000-room hotel for convention-center area lodging, estimating $22.5 million a year in direct spending. In March 2018, county officials first proposed a 22-story, 300-foot tower with 468 rooms, creating a 1,000-room hotel. The project would cost $165 million. By August of that year, new plans were released with a redesigned 26-story tower.

The hotel tower broke ground in August 2019. It was designed by architectural firm Cooper Carry. The tower is the tallest building built in Columbus in over 15 years. It was built at a cost of $264.5 million, an increase from the $220 million announced when construction began. Costs added with the rooftop bar and restaurant, additional meeting room and ballroom space, and with adjustments to meet market conditions.

The tower was previously set to open in August 2022, delayed to early September and then September 11 due to a small amount of water damage. In preparation for the opening, the hotel commissioned local fashion designers to create new uniforms for its staff. A ribbon cutting and opening gala will be held in mid-November 2022.

== See also ==
- List of tallest buildings in Columbus, Ohio
