= Nationwide Fountain =

Fountain in Columbus, Ohio, U.S.

- Artist: Jim Ponter and Don Olson
- Medium: Stone and bronze
- Subject: Animals
- Location: Columbus, Ohio
- 39°58′3.9″N 83°0′7.1″W

Nationwide Fountain is a fountain designed by sculptor Jim Ponter and architect Don Olson in downtown Columbus, Ohio, United States. It is located at Nationwide Plaza, a complex of buildings including One Nationwide Plaza, and within Dean Jeffers Park. The abstract fountain features stacked geometric blocks of stone and bronze sculptures of various animals, including a frog, lizard, and salmon.

The fountain was surveyed by the Smithsonian Institution's "Save Outdoor Sculpture!" program in 1994.

== See also ==
- Bicentennial Park (Columbus, Ohio)
