= One Nationwide Plaza =

Skyscraper in Columbus, Ohio

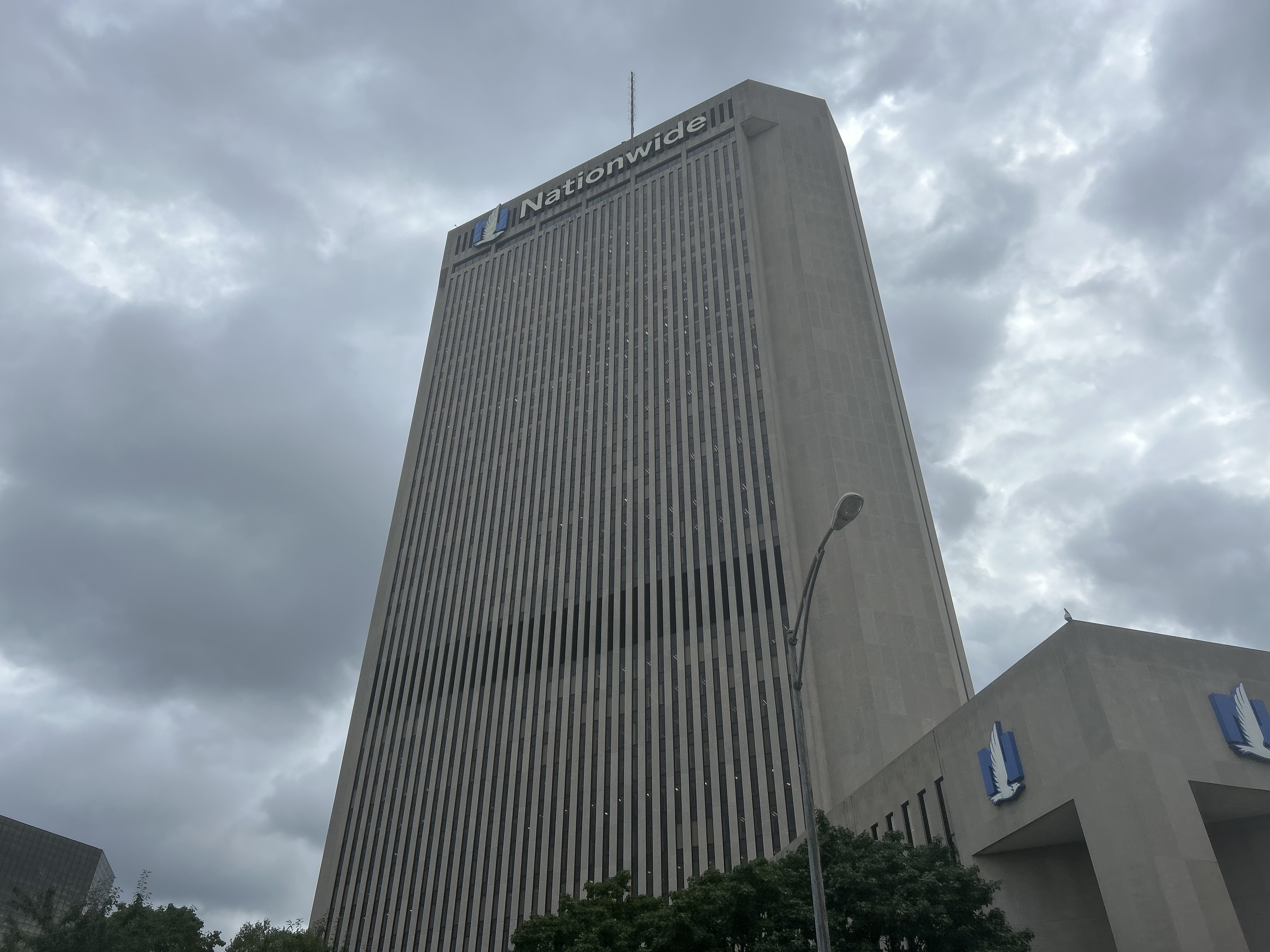
- One Nationwide Plaza, seen in July 2024
- Interactive map of the One Nationwide Plaza area

General information
- Status: Completed
- Location: Columbus, Ohio
- Coordinates: 39.968462°N 83.002449°W
- Completed: 1977; 49 years ago

One Nationwide Plaza is a 40-story skyscraper in Columbus, Ohio, United States, that serves as the corporate office headquarters of Nationwide Mutual Insurance Company. It is part of the complex of buildings known as Nationwide Plaza. The building, constructed between 1974 and 1978, is the sixth-tallest in Columbus, standing at a height of 485 feet (148 m).

Nationwide outgrew its 246 North High Street Building by the 1970s and work began on a new headquarters for the company. In 1977, the 485 ft-tall (148 m) building was completed. The building is located at the corner of N. High Street and what is now Nationwide Blvd. on the northern edge of downtown Columbus, Ohio.

== Design ==
The building was designed by Brubaker/Brandt (the same firm that designed Rhodes State Office Tower, the tallest building in Columbus) and Harrison & Abramovitz. The façade is dark vertical steel ribs bordered by white limestone ends which follows the modernist style. Blue spotlights light the exterior at night in the same color of Nationwide's logo. In December the interior lights are set so that it reads "happy holidays" to observers of the building, with thematic messages similarly displayed during other holidays and special events such as Columbus Blue Jackets and Ohio State Buckeyes victories and accomplishments.

There was once a restaurant on the 38th floor called One Nation, which opened in November 1977. The glass elevator on the side of the building is an express elevator that was designated for customers going to the restaurant. One Nation closed in 1997 after '[failing] to come to terms with the building's owner'. The glass elevator is no longer in service.

One Nationwide Plaza was the first of several buildings known collectively as Nationwide Plaza:

- One Nationwide Plaza, completed in 1977
- 280 Plaza (also known as Two Nationwide), completed in 1981
- Three Nationwide Plaza, completed in 1988
- Four Nationwide Plaza (215 N Front St), bought in 1998
- 10 W. Nationwide Blvd, completed in December 2012

Other elements at Nationwide Plaza include Dean Jeffers Park and its decorative fountains, titled Nationwide Fountain.

== Gallery ==
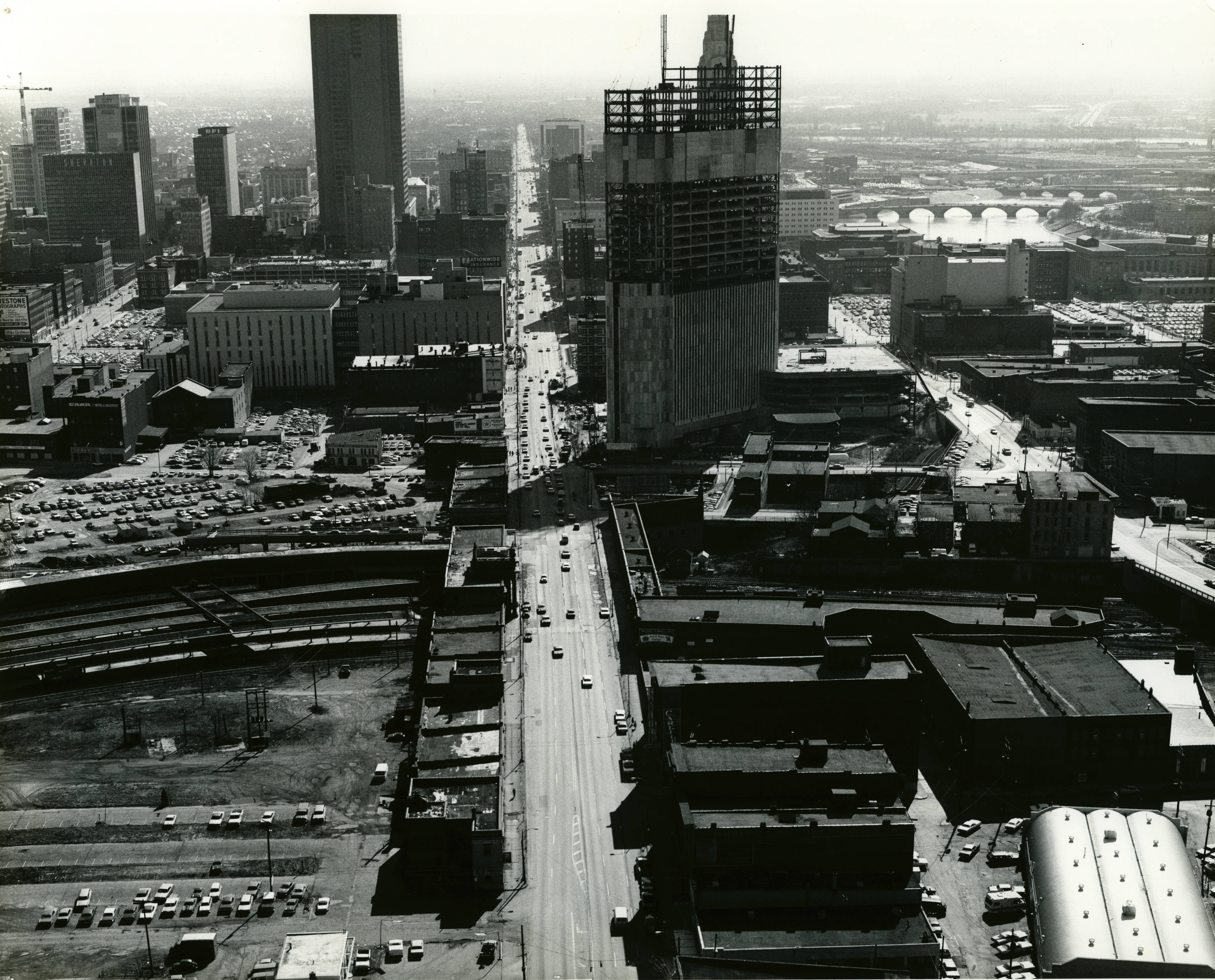
Under construction, 1977

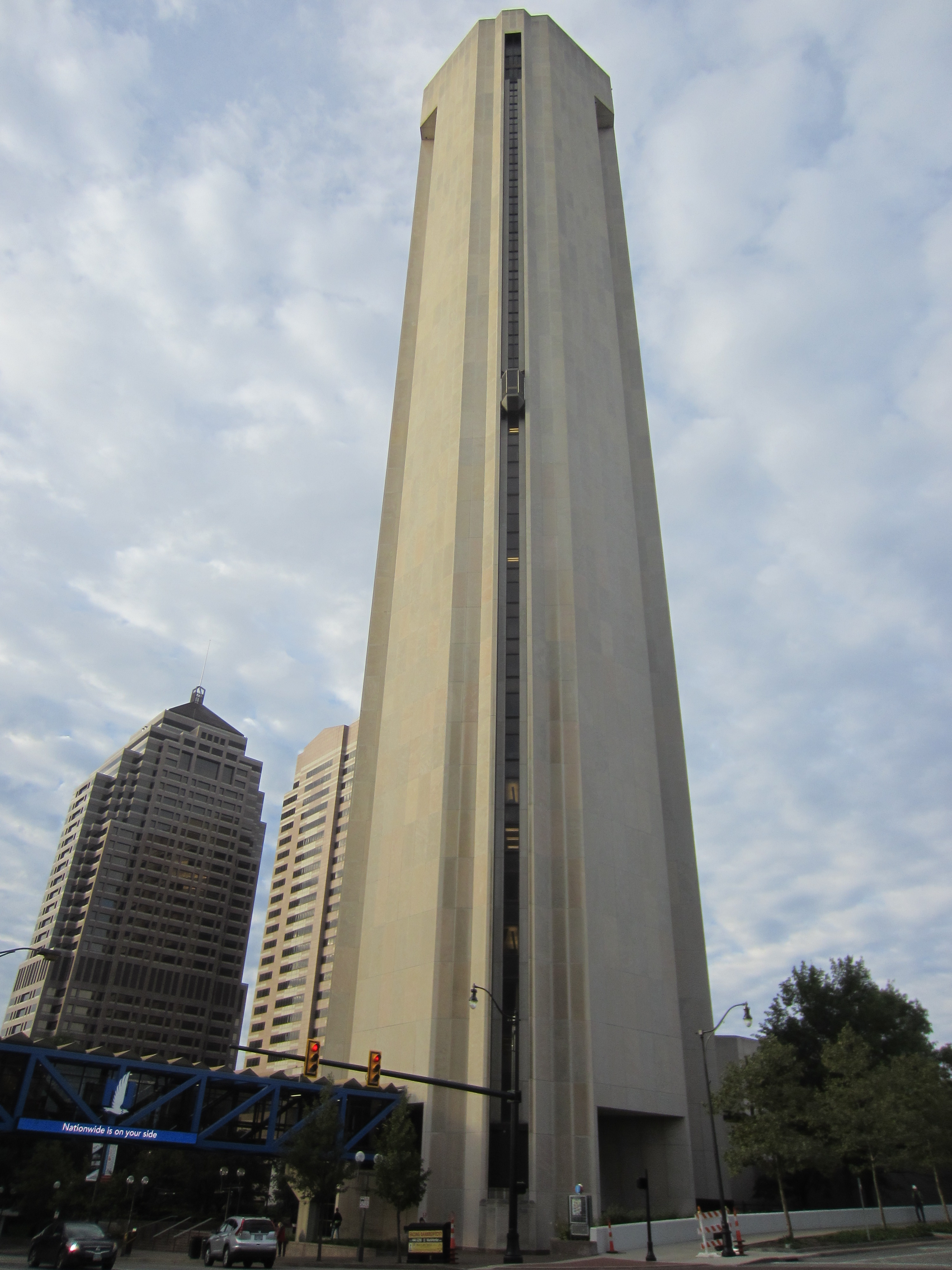
Exterior elevator

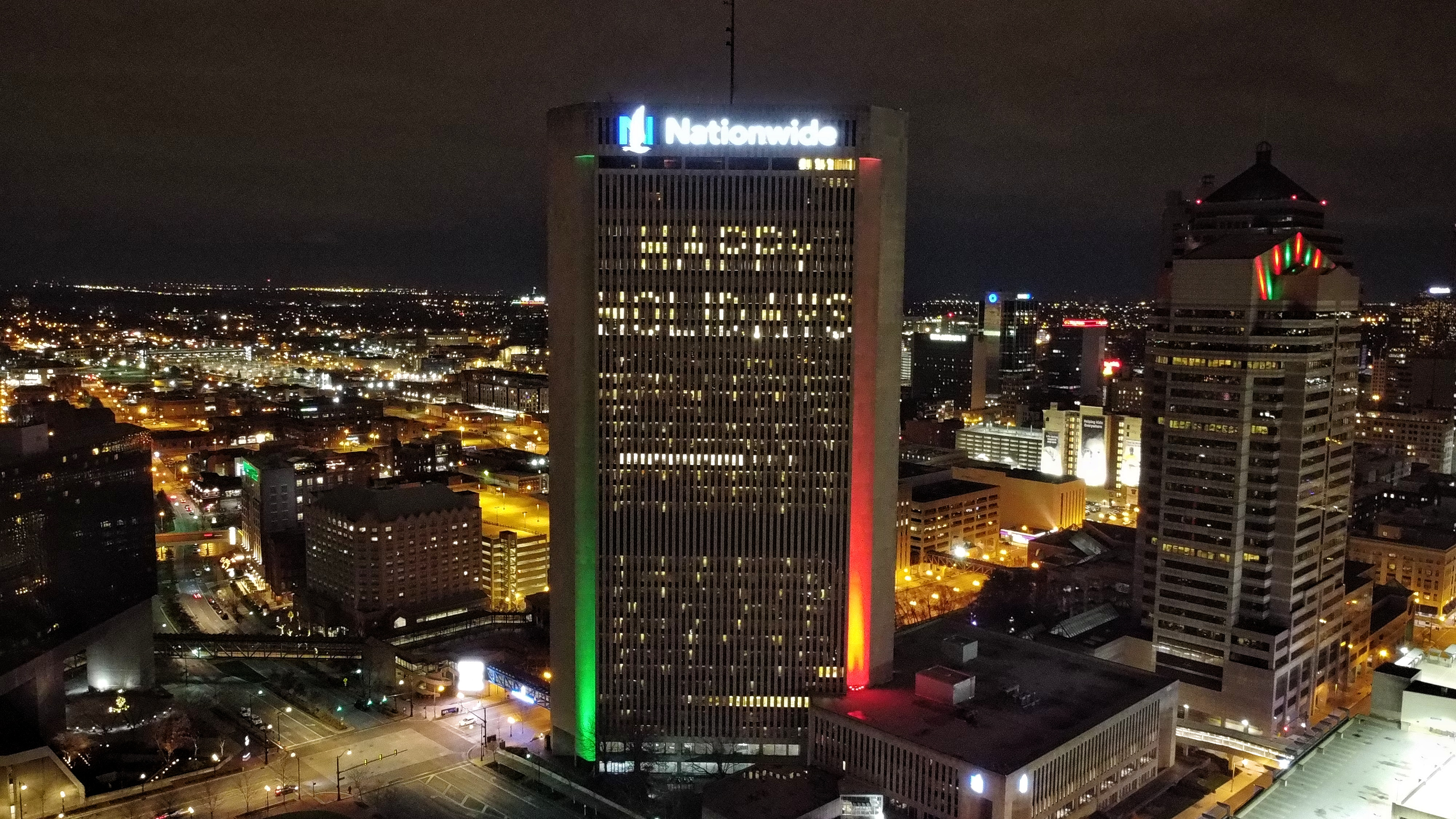
Holiday lights

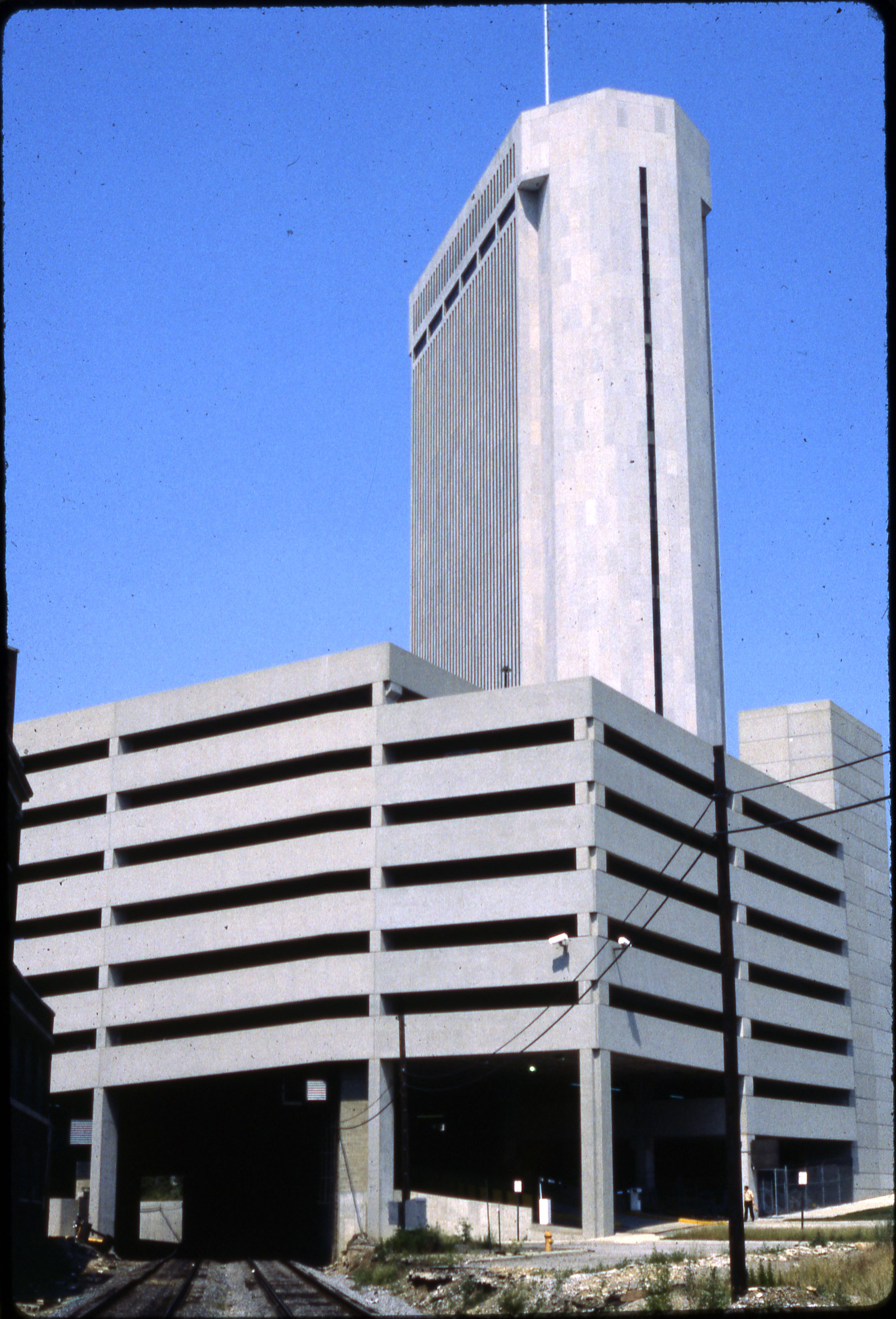

== See also ==
- List of tallest buildings in Columbus, Ohio
