= Fifth Third Center (Columbus, Ohio) =

Skyscraper on Capitol Square in Downtown Columbus, Ohio

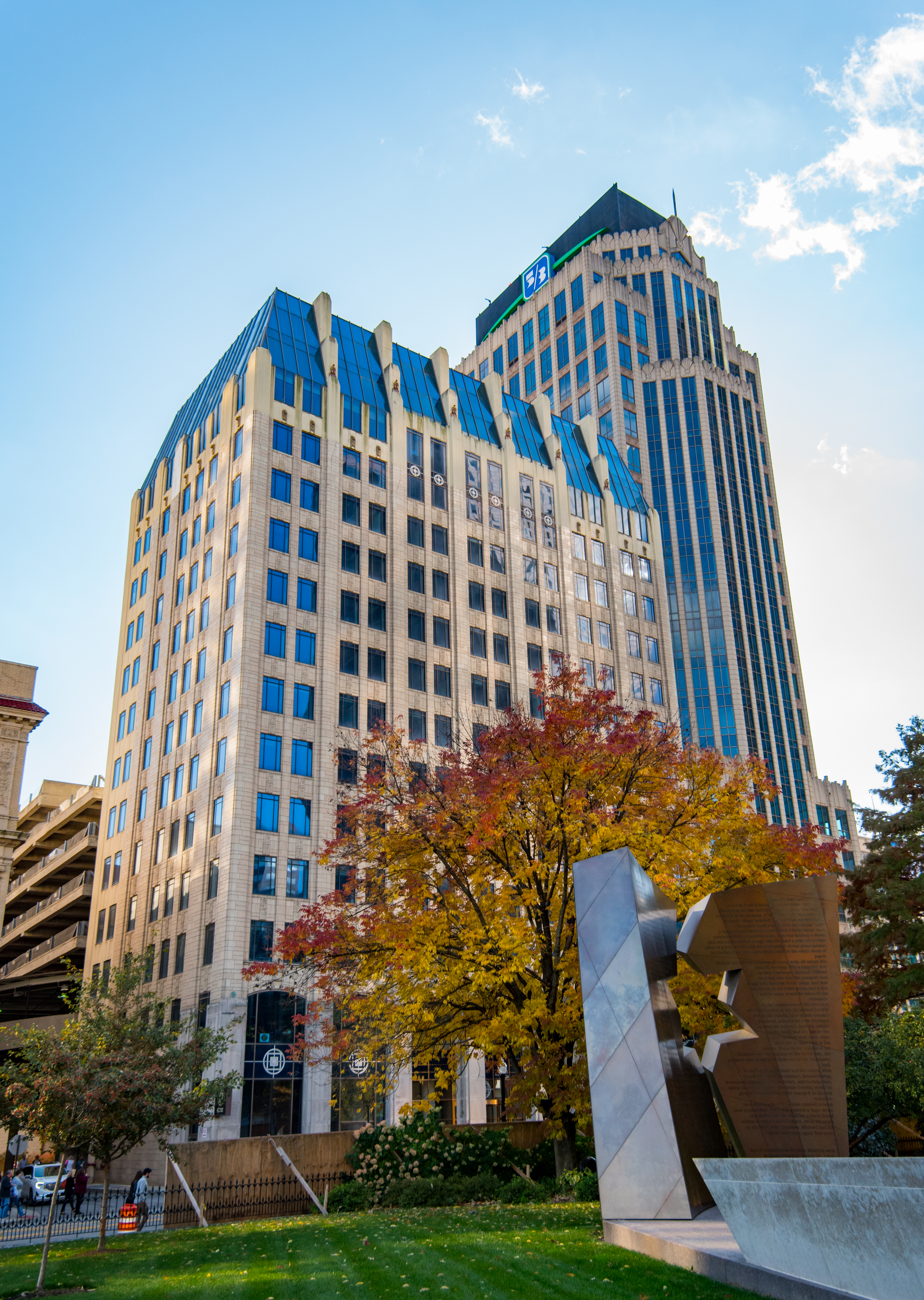

General information
- Type: Office
- Location: 21 East State Street, Columbus, Ohio
- Coordinates: 39.96003°N 82.99960°W
- Completed: 1998

Height
- Roof: 302 ft (92 m)

Technical details
- Floor count: 23

Design and construction
- Architects: Miller & Reeves

Fifth Third Center is a 302 ft-tall (92 m) skyscraper on Capitol Square in Downtown Columbus, Ohio. It was completed in 1998 and has 23 floors. Miller & Reeves designed the building, which is the 17th tallest in Columbus. The skyscraper was designed in a post-modern style. The building was constructed as an addition to the Beggs Building, an Art Deco highrise built in 1928.

== See also ==
- List of tallest buildings in Columbus, Ohio
