= Chase Tower (Columbus, Ohio) =

Skyscraper in Columbus, Ohio, US

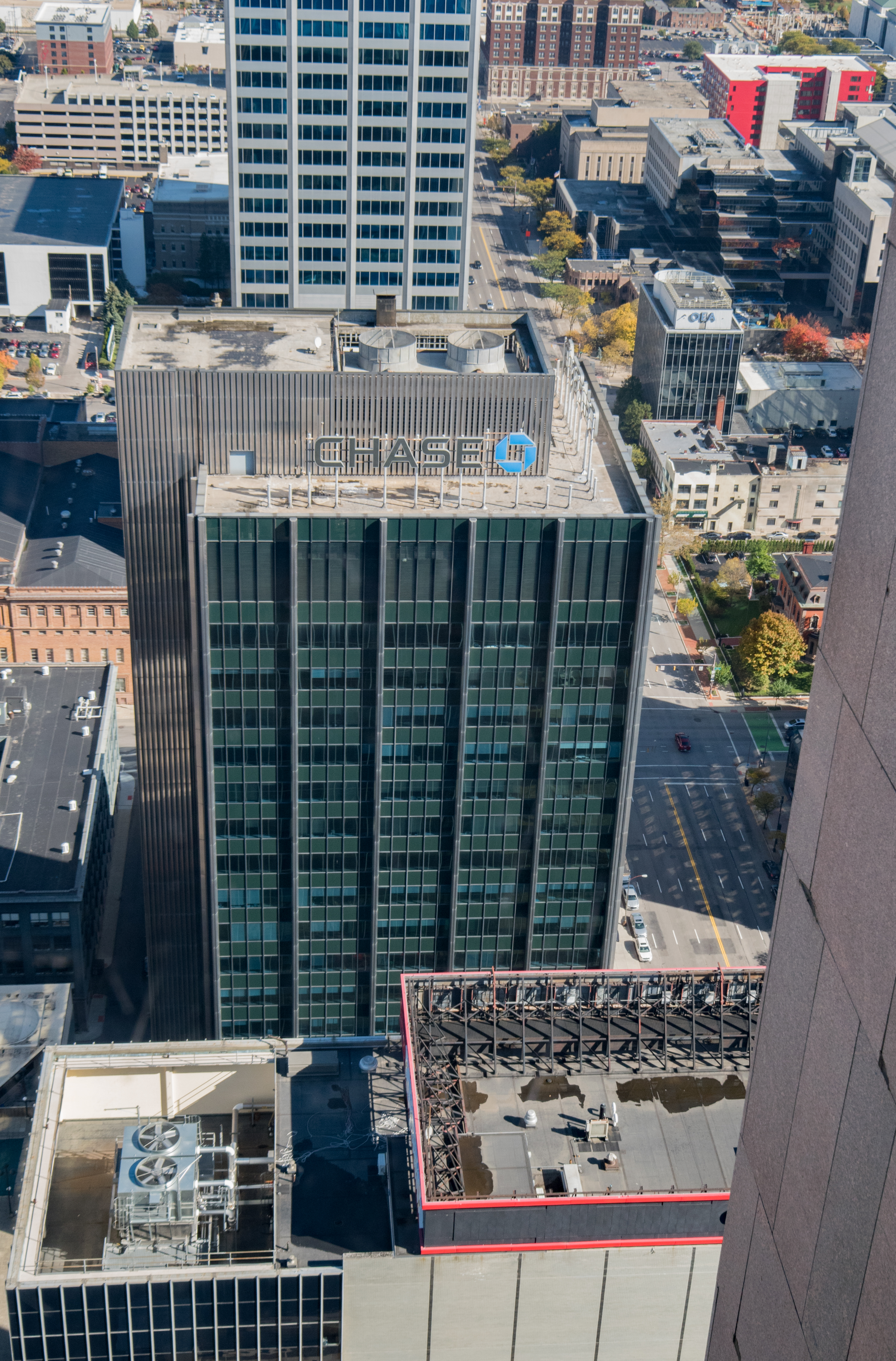
- View from the Rhodes State Office Tower
- Interactive map of the Chase Tower area
- Former names: Columbus Center, Bank One Tower

General information
- Type: Office
- Location: 100 East Broad Street, Columbus, Ohio
- Coordinates: 39°57′47″N 82°59′51″W
- Completed: 1964

Height
- Roof: 357 ft (109 m)

Technical details
- Floor count: 25
- Floor area: 309,990 sq ft (28,799 m^{2})

Design and construction
- Architect: Harrison & Abramovitz
- Main contractor: Turner Construction Company

U.S. National Register of Historic Places
- Designated: March 10, 2023
- Reference no.: 100008685

Chase Tower is a 357-foot-tall (109 m) skyscraper located at 100 East Broad Street in Columbus, Ohio, United States. It was completed in 1964 and has 25 floors. It is the 13th tallest building in Columbus and was the tallest constructed in the 1960s. The building served as the headquarters of Bank One prior to its merger with First Chicago NBD, and was known as the Bank One Tower; it later became known as the Columbus Center. The building was designed by the architectural firm Harrison & Abramovitz and it follows the international architectural style. The building also employs a curtain wall facade system.

In April 2021, Chase consolidated its offices, vacating the three floors it occupied in Chase Tower. The building's Chase bank branch and name are still to remain. It was listed on the National Register of Historic Places in 2023.

The building replaced the Rowland office building, demolished in 1963. The Rowland had a restaurant and clock repair shop in its basement, a health food store upstairs, and storefronts on its street level including shoe stores, an eyeglass store, piano store, art gallery, and dance studio.

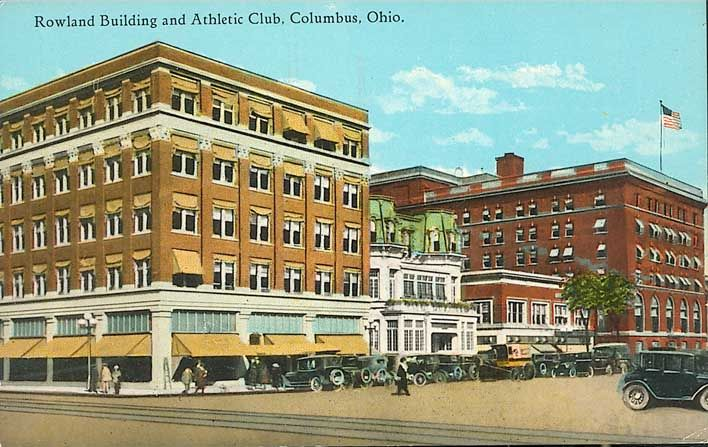
The Rowland Building and other prior buildings on the site

== See also ==
- List of tallest buildings in Columbus
- National Register of Historic Places listings in Columbus, Ohio
