= Midland Building =

Skyscraper located at 250 East Broad Street, Columbus, Ohio

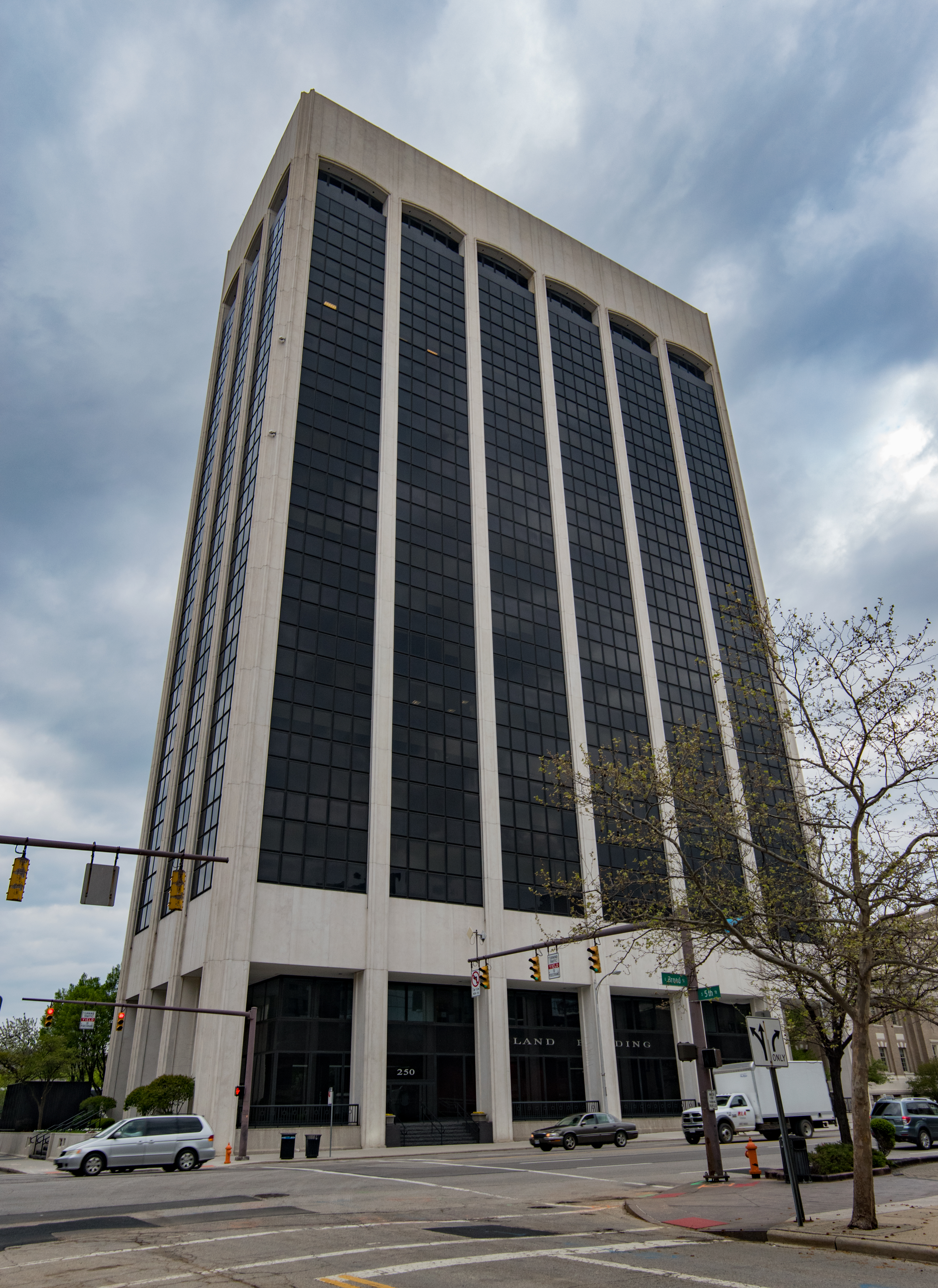
- Interactive map of the Midland Building area

General information
- Type: Office
- Location: 250 East Broad Street, Columbus, Ohio
- Coordinates: 39.96003°N 82.99819°W
- Completed: 1970

Height
- Roof: 280 ft (85 m)

Technical details
- Floor count: 21

Design and construction
- Architect: Thomas E. Stanley

The Midland Building is a 280 ft (85 m) tall skyscraper located at 250 East Broad Street, Columbus, Ohio. The office building was completed in 1970 and has 21 floors. Thomas E. Stanley designed the building, which is the 19th tallest in Columbus.

== See also ==
- List of tallest buildings in Columbus
