= Miranova Place =

Building complex in Columbus, Ohio

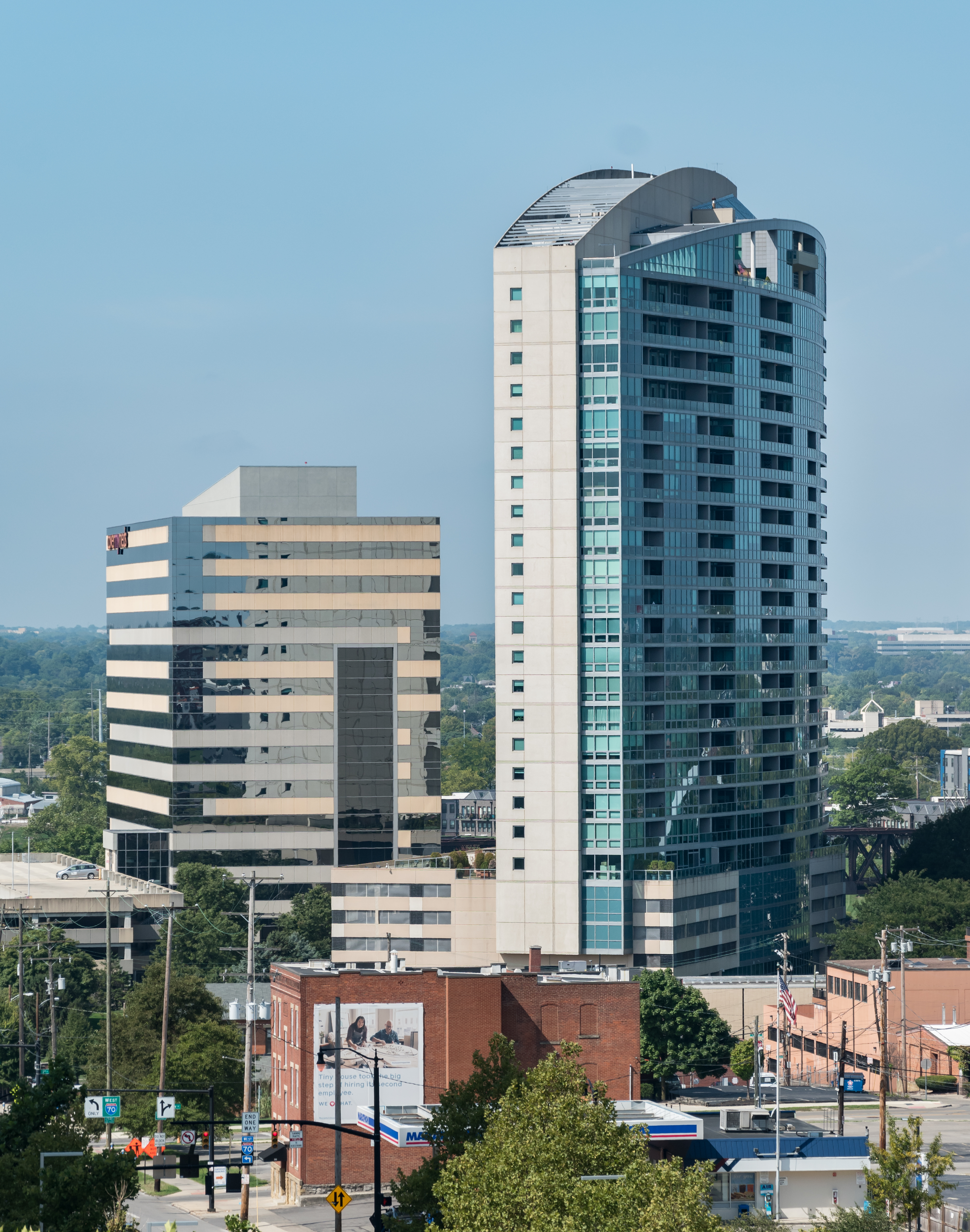
- Miranova Corporate Tower (left) and Miranova Condominiums (right)
- Interactive map of the Miranova Place area

General information
- Location: 1 and 2 Miranova Place, Columbus, Ohio
- Coordinates: 39°57′16.82″N 83°0′20.29″W

Design and construction
- Architect: Arquitectonica

Miranova Place is an office and condominiums complex in Columbus, Ohio. The complex was completed in 2001. It consists of Miranova Condominiums and Miranova Corporate Tower, located at 1 and 2 Miranova Place respectively. Miranova Corporate Tower is 157 ft (48 m) tall and has 12 floors, while Miranova Condominiums is 314 ft (96 m) tall and has 26 floors, making it one of the tallest residential buildings in Ohio. The buildings were designed by the architectural firm Arquitectonica and constructed in the modern architectural style.

== See also ==
- List of tallest buildings in Columbus, Ohio
