= One Columbus Center =

High-rise office building in Downtown Columbus, Ohio

Coordinates: 39.962°N 83.001°W

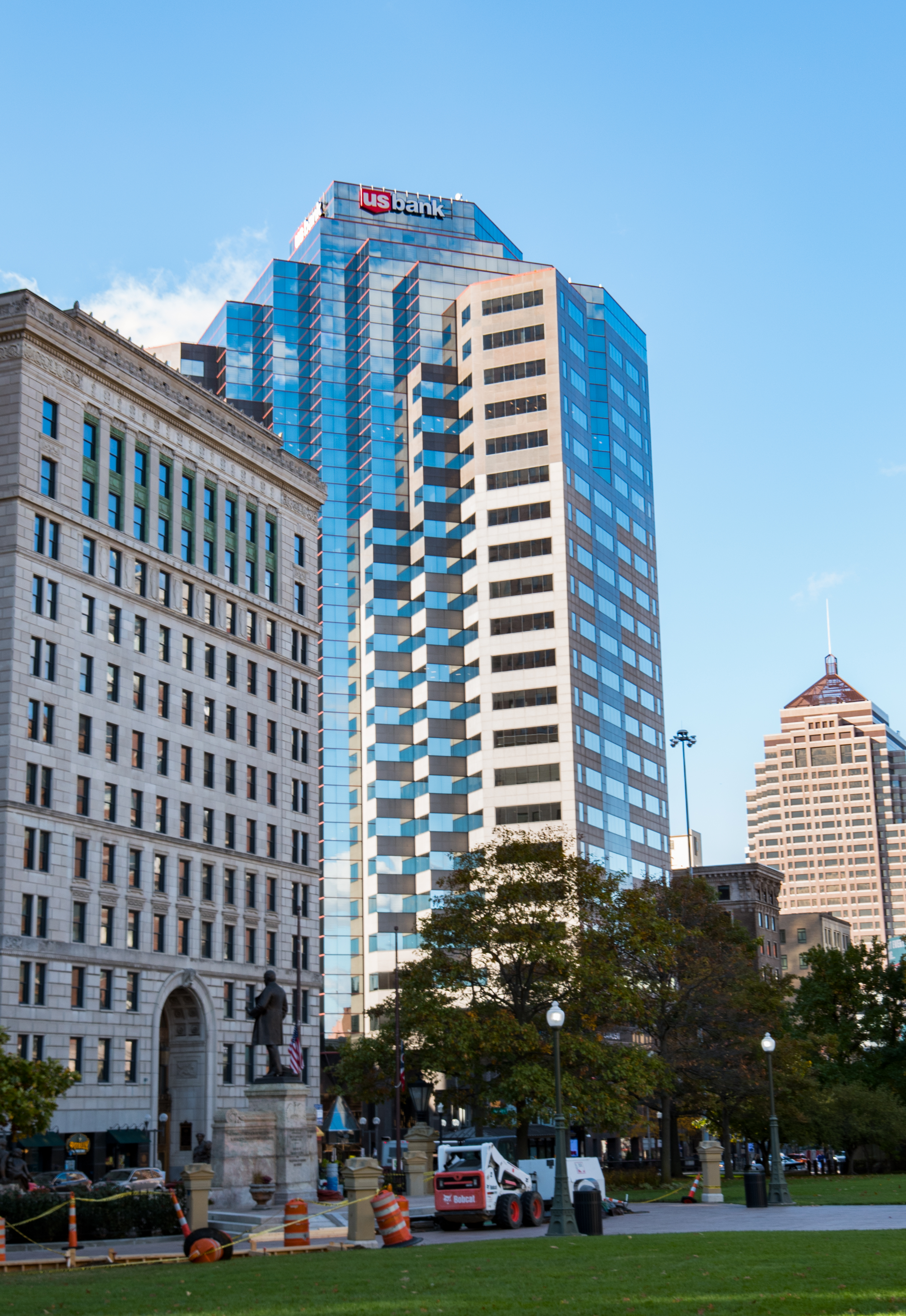
- Interactive map of the One Columbus Center area

General information
- Status: Completed
- Type: Office
- Location: 10 West Broad Street, Columbus, Ohio
- Completed: 1987; 39 years ago

Height
- Roof: 366 ft (112 m)

Technical details
- Floor count: 26
- Floor area: 37,855 m^{2} (407,470 sq ft)

Design and construction
- Architect: NBBJ

One Columbus Center is a 366 ft (112 m) highrise office building in Downtown Columbus, Ohio. The cornerstone for the building was laid on October 21, 1986, and it was completed the next year. NBBJ designed the building after the post-modern architectural style. One Columbus Center was constructed for $62 million and is the 11th tallest in Columbus. The staggered facade allows for 15 corner offices on every floor. It has 37,855 m^{2} of floor space and sits on the former site of the Deshler Hotel.

== See also ==
- List of tallest buildings in Columbus
