= Key Bank Building =

Skyscraper on Capitol Square in downtown Columbus, Ohio

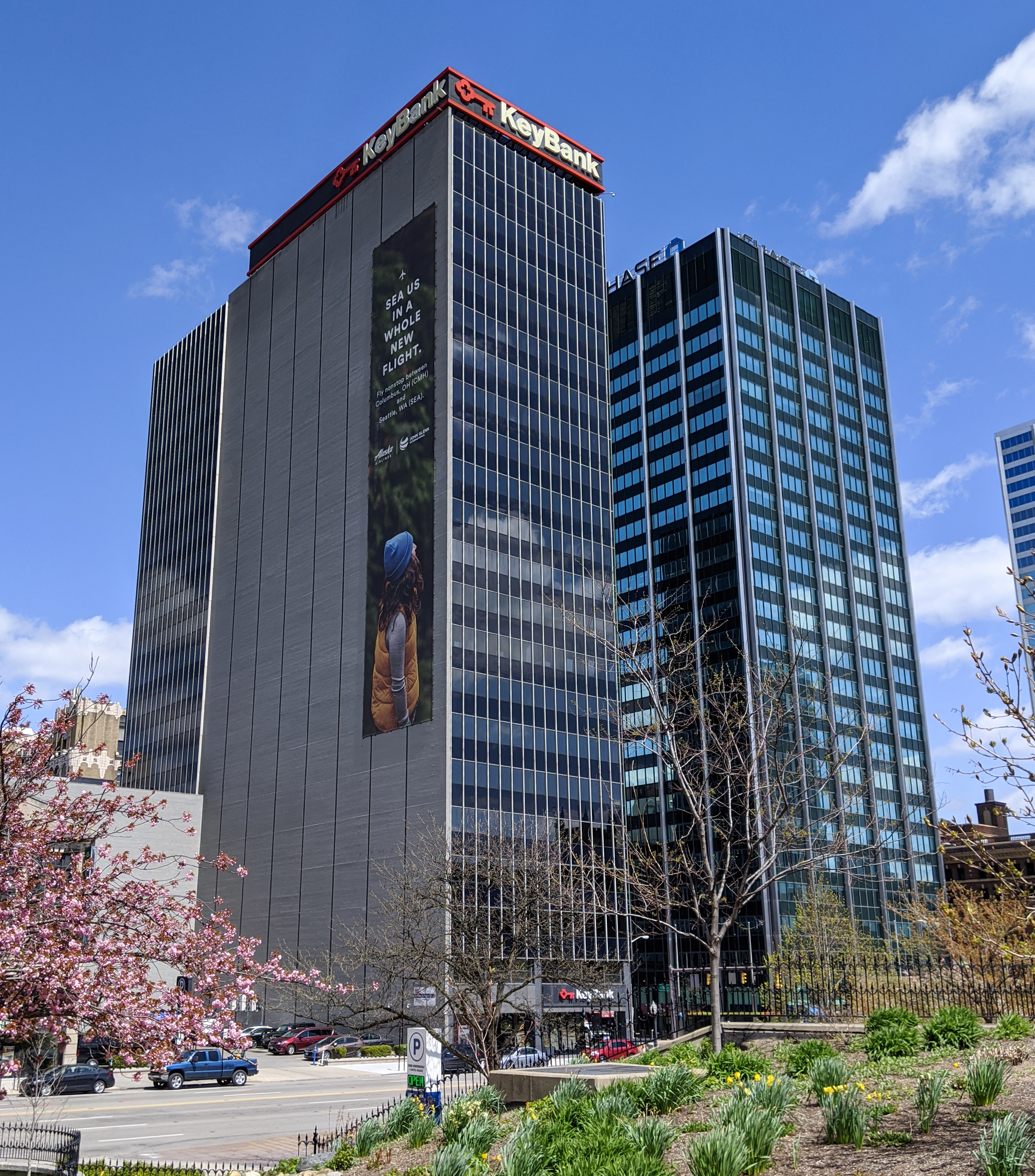
- Key Bank Building in the foreground
- Interactive map of the Key Bank Building area

General information
- Status: Completed
- Type: Office
- Location: 88 East Broad Street, Columbus, Ohio
- Coordinates: 39°57′46″N 82°59′54″W
- Completed: 1963

Height
- Roof: 253 ft (77 m)

Technical details
- Floor count: 20
- Floor area: 24,619 m^{2} (265,000 sq ft)

The Key Bank Building is a 253 ft (77 m) tall skyscraper on Capitol Square in downtown Columbus, Ohio. It was completed in 1963 and has 20 floors. It is the 25th tallest building in Columbus and has 265,000 sq ft (24,600 m^{2}) of floor space.
