= 16 East Broad Street =

Building in Downtown Columbus, Ohio

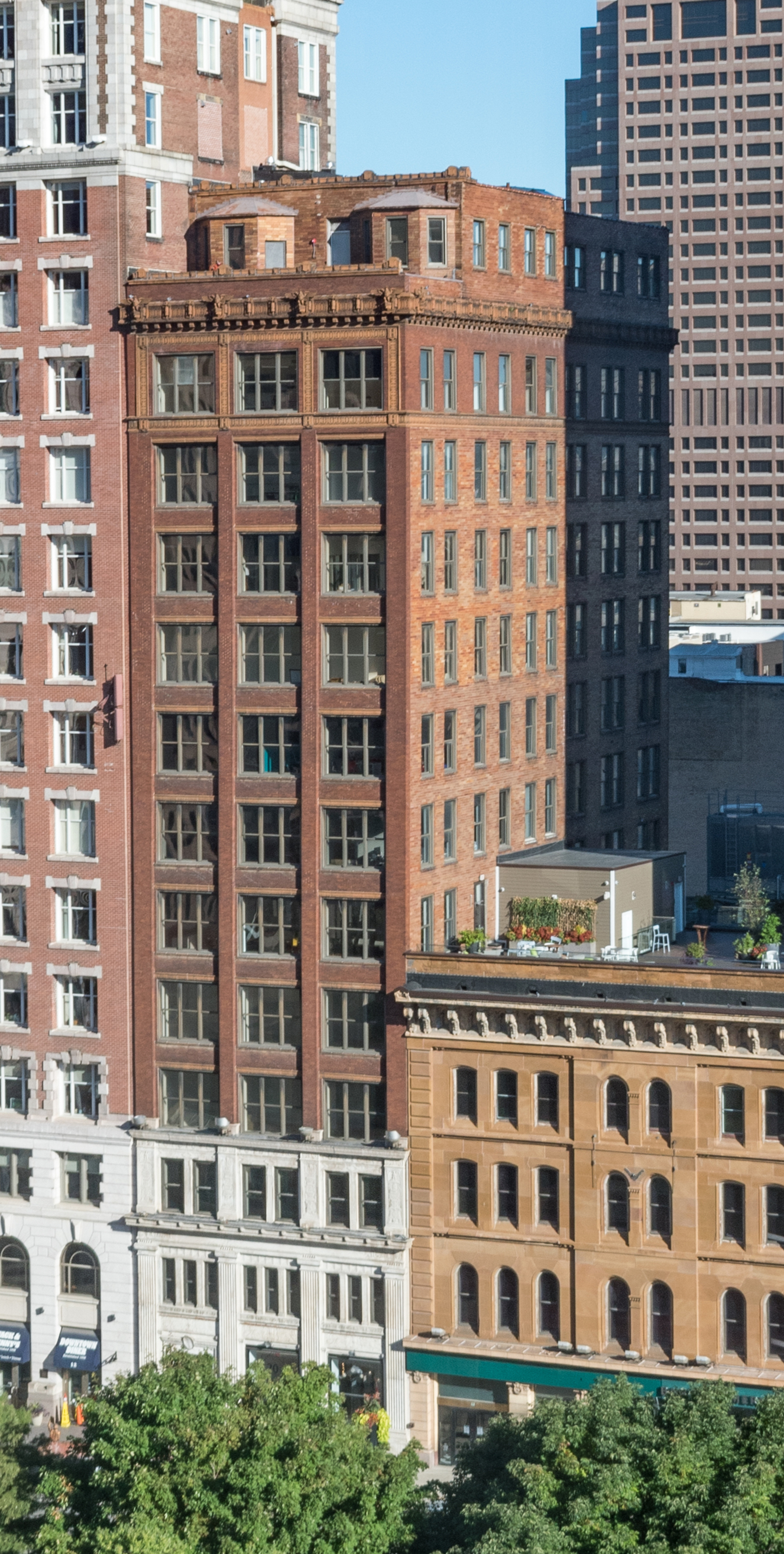
- Alternative names: New Hayden Building

General information
- Status: Completed
- Type: High-rise building
- Architectural style: Chicago school
- Location: 16 East Broad St., Columbus, Ohio
- Completed: 1901

Height
- Roof: 168 ft (51 m)

Technical details
- Floor count: 13
- Lifts/elevators: 3

Design and construction
- Architects: Nimmons & Fellows
- New Hayden Building
- U.S. National Register of Historic Places
- Interactive map highlighting the building's location
- Coordinates: 39.9625°N 83.0002°W
- NRHP reference No.: 09000413
- Added to NRHP: June 11, 2009

16 East Broad Street is a building on Capitol Square in Downtown Columbus, Ohio. Completed in 1901, the building stands at a height of 168 feet (51 m), with 13 floors. It stood as the tallest building in the city until being surpassed by 8 East Broad Street in 1906.

From 1927 to 1939, the eleventh floor of the building served as the office for the National Football League. Joseph F. Carr, a Columbus native, was president of the NFL at the time.

== See also ==
- National Register of Historic Places listings in Columbus, Ohio
