= The Newsboy =

Sculpture in Columbus, Ohio, U.S.

- The statue in 2018
- Artist: Bruce Hanners
- Year: 2018
- Medium: Bronze sculpture
- Subject: Paperboy
- Location: 12 E. Broad St., Columbus, Ohio, U.S.
- 39.9624100°N 83.0002133°W

The Newsboy is a bronze sculpture of a newspaper carrier in Columbus, Ohio, United States. The statue, created by artist Bruce Hanners, is located outside the 8 on the Square condominium building, on Broad Street in the Capitol Square area of downtown Columbus.

== Description ==
The sculpture depicts a paperboy wearing a hat, scarf, and winter coat. The figure holds up vintage newspapers from The Columbus Dispatch and The Columbus Citizen-Journal, while standing beside a stack of newspapers. The newspapers include text about the founding of the organization and list its contributors.

The statue is located by the corner of Broad and High Streets, where Charity Newsies was founded. A nearby plaque describes the founding event that took place there in 1907.

== History ==
The statue was commissioned by Charity Newsies, an organization that raises funds to donate clothes to children in need. The organization is known for its volunteers selling special edition copies of The Columbus Dispatch annually to raise money for the organization. Charity Newsies held an unveiling ceremony for the statue in June 2018, commemorating its 110th anniversary, attended by Mayor Andrew Ginther.

The idea for the statue came from Tom Beck, a longtime member and past president of the organization. Beck contacted Bruce Hanners, the sculptor and a lab technician at the Columbus College of Art and Design, to design the work; he sculpted it with the help of student volunteers.

== See also ==
- 2018 in art
