= The Condominiums at North Bank Park =

Residential high rise at 300 W. Spring St. in the Arena District of Columbus, Ohio

Coordinates: 39°57′58″N 83°0′36″W

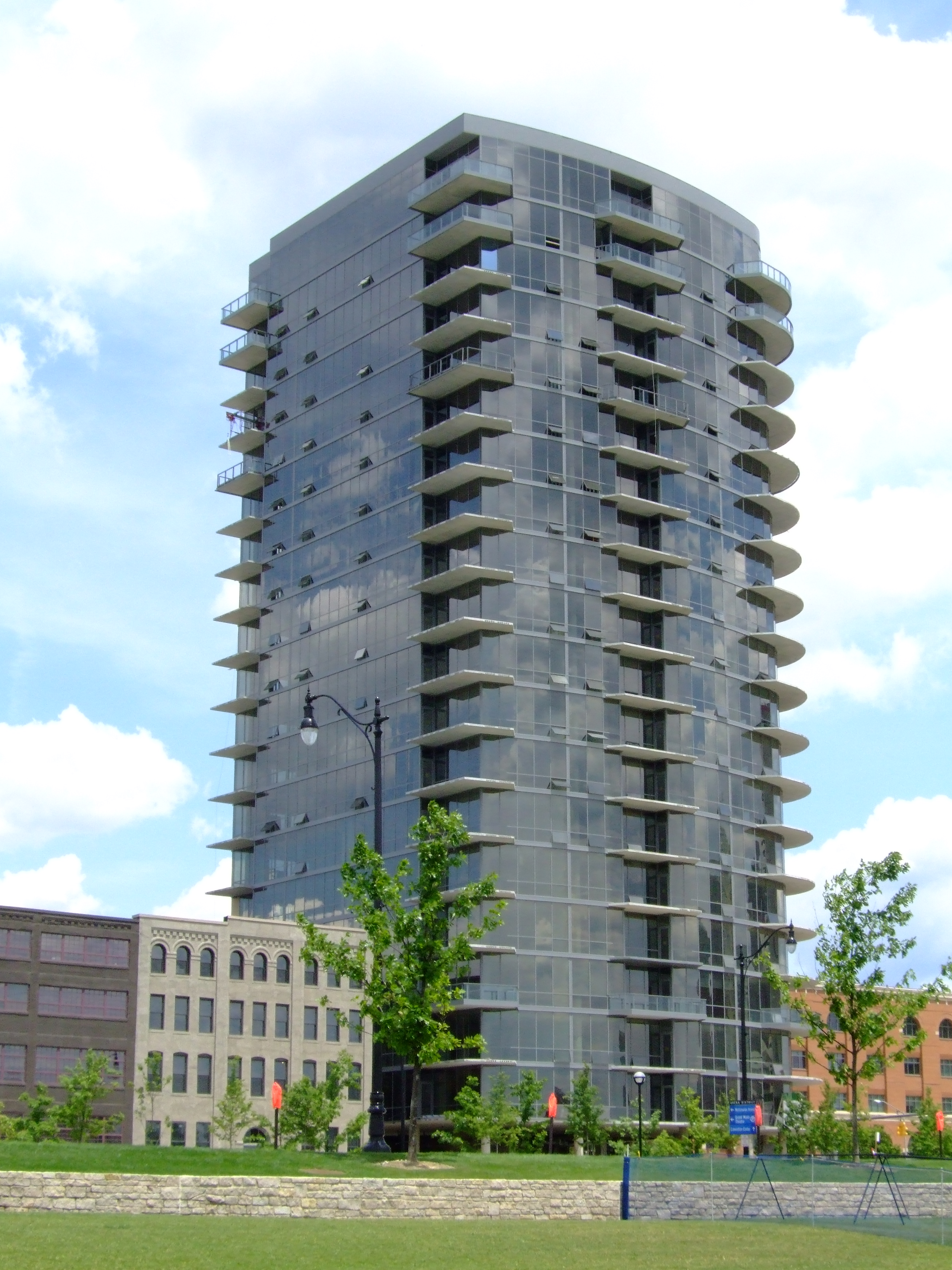
- Interactive map of the The Condominiums at North Bank Park area

General information
- Type: Residential
- Location: 300 West Spring Street, Columbus, Ohio
- Construction started: 2006
- Completed: 2007
- Cost: $50 million

Height
- Roof: 267 ft (81 m)

Technical details
- Floor count: 20
- Floor area: 375,340 square feet

Design and construction
- Developer: Nationwide Realty Investors
- Main contractor: Messer Construction

The Condominiums at North Bank Park is a 267 feet (81 m) tall residential high rise at 300 W. Spring St. in the Arena District just north of downtown Columbus, Ohio. It was constructed from 2006 to 2007 and has 20 floors and is one of the tallest structures in the city

The building was developed by Nationwide Realty Investors, a development entity created by Nationwide Insurance which is headquartered nearby. Built as part of a development boom in the Arena District after the completion of Nationwide Arena, the $50 million building has 100 condominium units and ground-floor parking built into a re-developed warehouse and attached glass residential tower. The building saw slow sales during the Great Recession but following economic recovery, additional development has continued around the building.

== Background ==
The Condominiums at North Bank Park was envisioned as part of a larger development boom in the Arena District, following the completion of Nationwide Arena, which ultimately led to $1 billion in private investment in the neighborhood. Nationwide Arena, a development projected to cost $203.5 million, became the home of a Major League Hockey team, the Columbus Blue Jackets and led to a surge in development in an urban area north of downtown Columbus that was formerly underdeveloped. Part of the plan for the 75-acre area of land called for large-scale mixed-use development amid a larger push for urban revitalization in the city core. In the meantime, the Columbus metropolitan area population grew by 10.6 percent from 2000 to 2010. A master plan for the Arena District area called for substantial construction around Nationwide Arena and the nearby Huntington Park. One component of this plan was for residential development to the south and along the Scioto River. Between 1999 and 2008, $374.6 million in private development was initiated in Arena District, and a 2008 study estimated the Arena District plan had led to $1 billion in total investment in the area. (Note: A 2008 study by the John Glenn College of Public Affairs estimated that $635 million in private sector development had been completed in the district, and $406 million in additional investment was planned.)

By 2014, the development of Arena District had created an area where about 1,000 people live and 14,000 people work.

== Construction ==
The condominium tower was announced in February 2006, As initially planned, overall project was to include a redeveloped former warehouse building with ground-floor parking and 20 loft style condominium units, and an attached 88-unit, 20-story residential tower. Condominiums in the building were to range from 1,600 to 2,400 square feet, and prices were intended to range from $350,000 on lower-level units to prices over $1 million for those on higher levels. The building's developer, Nationwide Realty Investors, is a development affiliate of Nationwide Insurance which is headquartered several blocks away and which had developed Nationwide Arena and been a central figure in the Arena District plan. The 275,340 square foot building cost $50 million to construct. Messer Construction served as general contractor for the building of the tower. The completed tower opened in December 2007.

Initially the building was to include 109 units, but the Great Recession and subsequent crash of the U.S. housing market slowed the sales at the property, and several units were combined and the overall number reduced to 100. Sales of condominium units in the building slowed considerably in 2008 before picking up again around 2014. Residential units sold for $348,000 to $2.9 million. The final unit in the development, a 1,960-square-foot "loft" condominium, sold in 2015 for $537,000.

At 267 feet (81 m), the tower is one of the tallest structures in Columbus, and also the most recently completed downtown high-rise development in the city. (Note: The James Cancer Hospital has subsequently been constructed at Ohio State University outside of the city's immediate core, completed in 2014.)

Once the project was largely completed, Nationwide Realty Investors commenced a "complementary but different" high-rise development, the 12-story Parks Edge Condominiums, to the east. These feature units from 1,500 to 3,200 square feet and priced from $427,000 to $1.34 million.

== See also ==
- List of tallest buildings in Columbus
