= Borden Building =

Skyscraper located at 180 East Broad Street in Columbus, Ohio

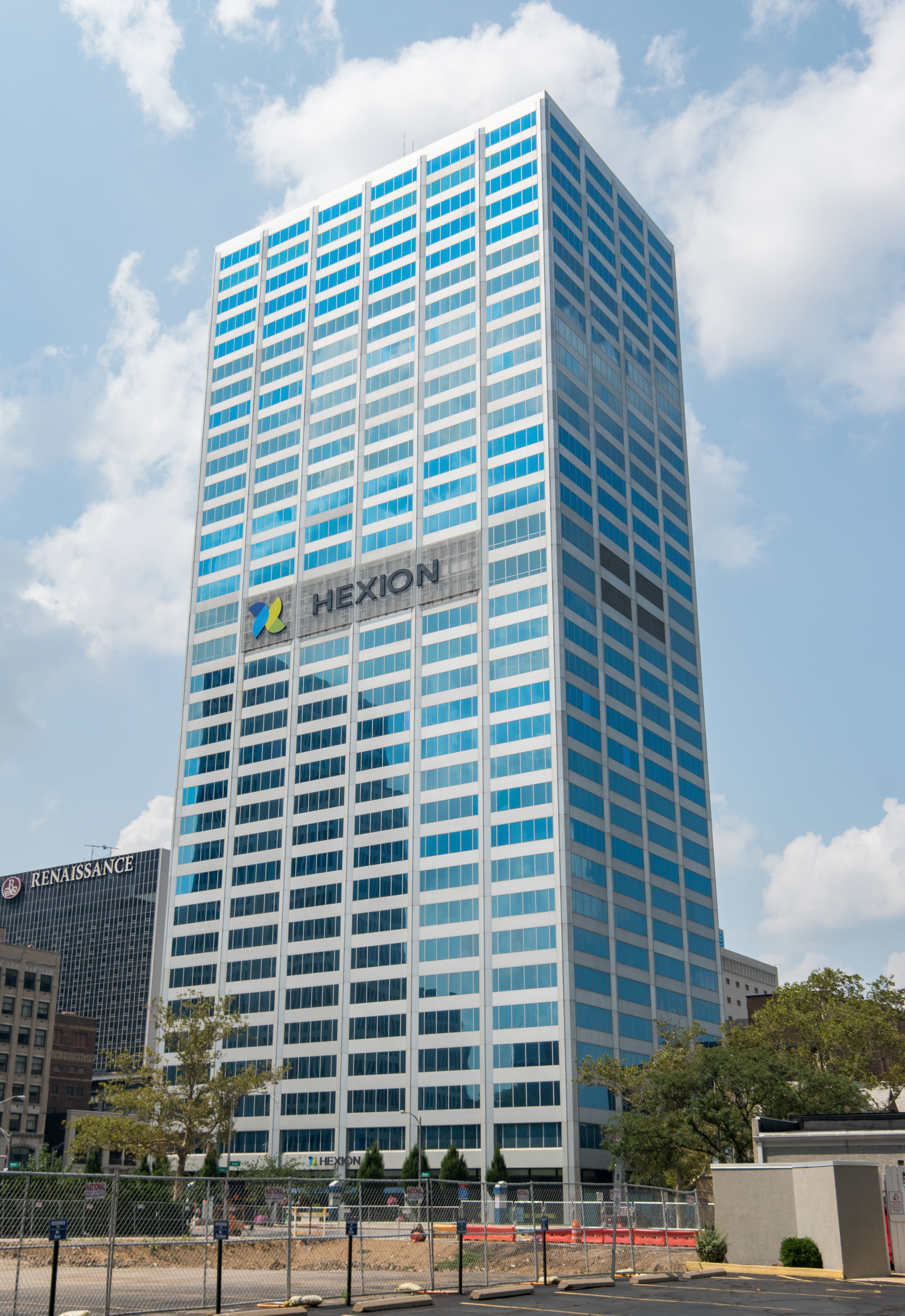
- Interactive map of the Borden Building area

General information
- Type: Office
- Location: 180 East Broad Street, Columbus, Ohio
- Coordinates: 39.9632°N 82.9958°W
- Completed: 1974; 52 years ago

Height
- Roof: 438 ft (134 m)

Technical details
- Floor count: 34
- Floor area: 52,842 m^{2} (568,790 sq ft)

Design and construction
- Architect: Harrison & Abramovitz

The Borden Building is a 438 ft (134m) tall skyscraper located at 180 East Broad Street in Columbus, Ohio, United States. It was topped out on May 9, 1973, and completed the next year. Harrison & Abramovitz designed the building following a modernist architectural style. The building has 34 floors and is the 9th tallest in Columbus. It also has 52,842 m^{2} of floor space. Current building tenants include Deloitte, Hexion, Washington Prime Group, and the Public Utilities Commission of Ohio.

== In popular culture ==
Parts of the music video for "At the Risk of Feeling Dumb" by Twenty One Pilots are filmed at the top of the building.

== See also ==
- List of tallest buildings in Columbus
