= 8 East Broad Street =

Building on Capitol Square in Downtown Columbus, Ohio

8 on the Square
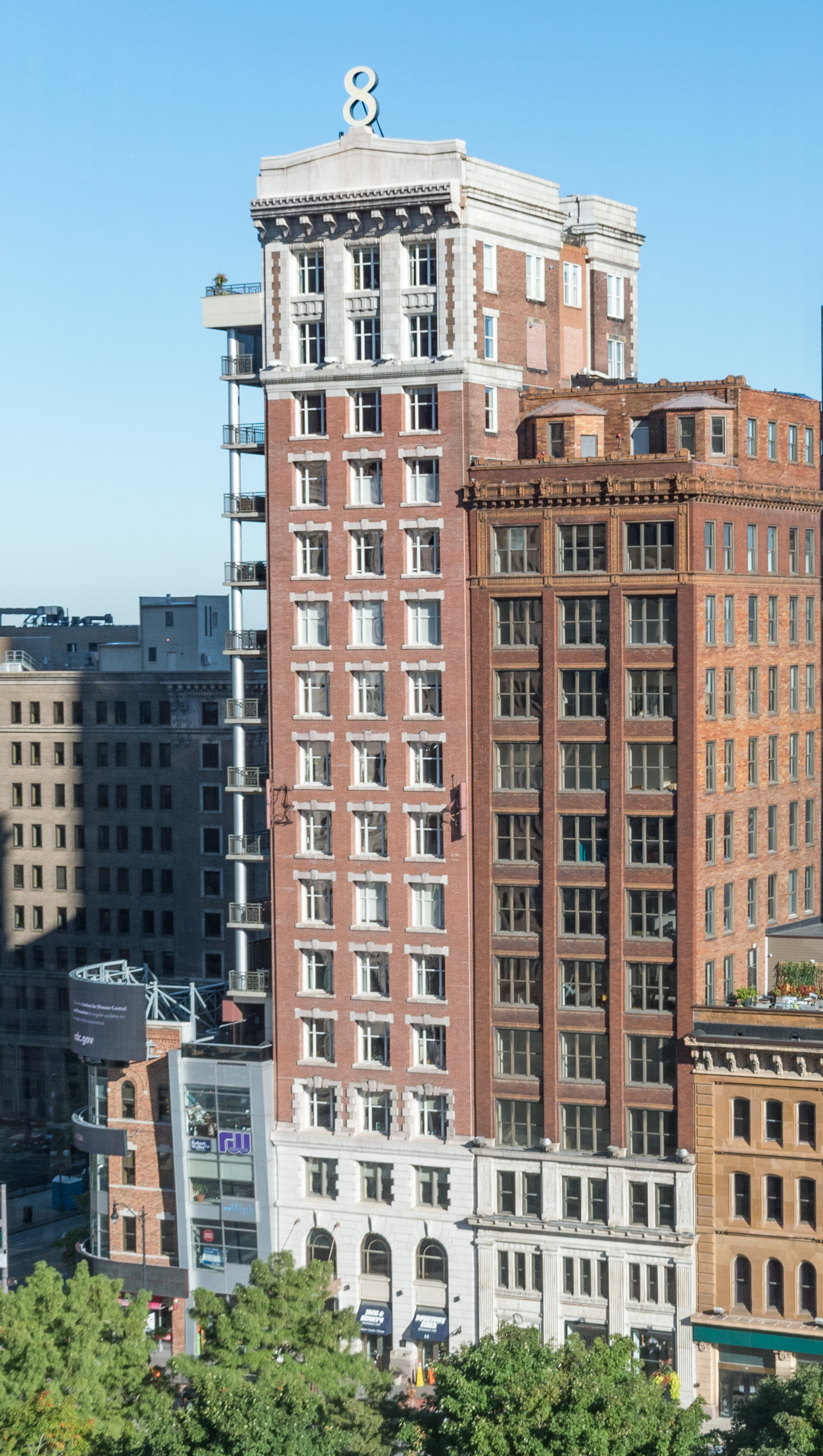
- Interactive map of the 8 on the Square area
- Alternative names: Capitol Trust Building; State Savings & Trust Building

General information
- Type: Commercial offices Residential apartments
- Location: 8 East Broad Street; Columbus, Ohio
- Coordinates: 39°57′45″N 83°00′01″W
- Completed: 1906

Height
- Roof: 65 m (213 ft)

Technical details
- Floor count: 17

Design and construction
- Architect: Frank Packard

8 East Broad Street is a building on Capitol Square in Downtown Columbus, Ohio. Built in 1906, it was the tallest building in the city until the LeVeque Tower was built in 1927. The architect was Frank Packard. Presently, it is a residential building, housing condominiums in a development called "8 on the Square".

== See also ==
- List of tallest buildings in Columbus, Ohio
- The Newsboy
