= The Towers (Ohio State) =

Student dormitories at Ohio State University in Columbus, OH, USA

Justin S. Morrill Tower & Abraham Lincoln Tower
- The Towers
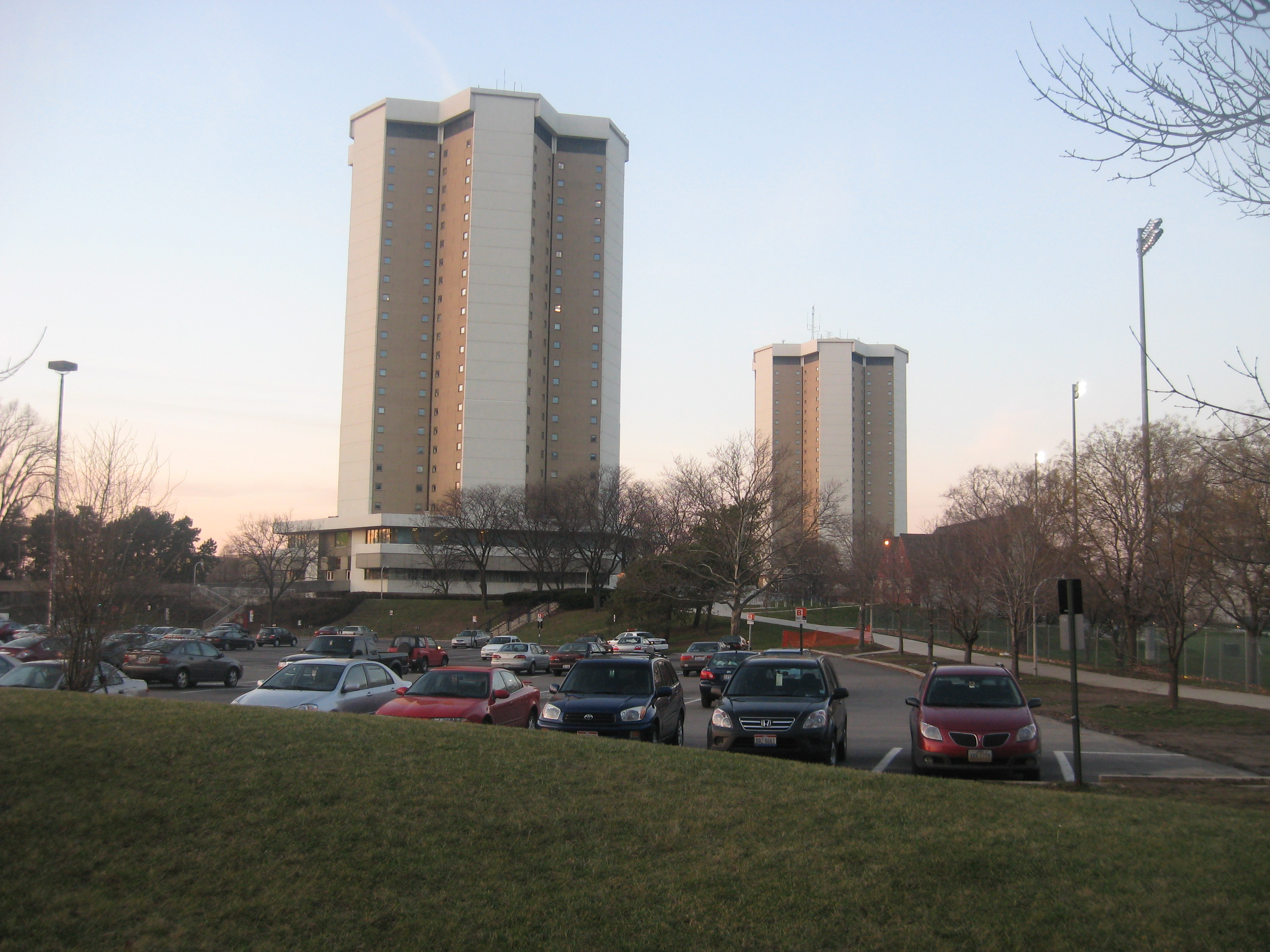
- Lincoln (front) & Morrill (back) Towers

General information
- Location: Lincoln Tower 1800 Cannon Drive Columbus, Ohio 43210 39°59′54.5″N 83°01′19.1″W Morrill Tower 1900 Cannon Drive Columbus, Ohio 43210 40°00′00.2″N 83°01′18.8″W, United States
- Current tenants: College of Medicine Office of Student Life Housing and Residence Education
- Construction started: 29 March 1965
- Completed: 8 August 1967
- Inaugurated: 11 November 1967
- Cost: $16,973,663 US Dollar
- Client: Ohio State University
- Owner: The Ohio State University

Height
- Height: 260 ft (79 m)

Technical details
- Floor count: 26

Website
- Lincoln Tower; Morrill Tower

Abraham Lincoln Tower & Justin S. Morrill Tower, also known as The Towers, Morrill Tower or Lincoln Tower are two undergraduate residential houses at Ohio State University. The Towers are located on the Ohio State University across from the east banks of the Olentangy River. The towers are on Cannon Drive in close proximity of the Ohio Stadium, RPAC (Recreation and Physical Activity Center), and the Wexner Medical Center.

== History ==
Plans for the Towers, by the architectural firm Schooley, Cornelius and Schooley, were approved by the OSU Housing Commission on December 10, 1964. The Towers were dedicated on November 11, 1965, with the groundbreaking ceremony having been held on March 29, 1965. Both buildings were originally planned to open in October 1966, but due to strikes and construction delays only the first 13 floors of Morrill were opened by that date. Construction completion of both buildings was celebrated at an open house on August 8, 1967.

The original plan was to build a total of six towers, along with other facilities, in order to create a social hub on west campus. In the end only two towers were built, along with the Drake Union. This served as both an alternate to the Ohio Union and the home of the theater department, before being demolished in 2023.

The Towers were the first coed residence halls on campus, housing both male and female students.

=== Morrill Tower ===
Justin S. Morrill Tower was named for Justin S. Morrill. Morrill was a U.S. Representative (and later Senator) from Vermont. Morrill introduced legislation, which would have had states sell public land in order to provide an endowment for a state university, which failed. Morrill reintroduced the bill to Congress in 1861, and this time it passed and was signed into law by President Abraham Lincoln on July 2, 1862. The Land Grant—or Morrill—Act, as the legislation came to be known, provided the means to establish The Ohio State University, and defined its mission. The Morrill Act stated that the proceeds from the sale of state lands was to go into an endowment fund that would enable designated colleges and universities to offer tuition more cheaply because of the federal support. It also stipulated that the designated colleges and universities teach both scientific and classical studies, as well as military training. (The bill was signed in the midst of the Civil War, and few men recruited had any grasp of military strategy or tactics.) It also stipulated that these universities and colleges provide mechanical and agricultural instruction.

Morrill Tower is currently used for:

- Floor 2 is used as a dining hall and campus store
- Floor 3 is used as a lobby.
- Floors 4-23 are used for residence hall purposes

In 1978, serial killer and sex offender Jeffrey Dahmer enrolled at The Ohio State University and resided in Morrill Tower. Dahmer resided in Morrill Tower for only one quarter and never officially declared a major before flunking out of the Ohio State University.

In February 1998, a fire broke out on the 5th floor. Students were evacuated; minimal damage occurred.

=== Lincoln Tower ===
Abraham Lincoln Tower was named for the nation's 16th president, Abraham Lincoln. He signed the Morrill Act into law in 1862, which established the system of land-grant institutions in the United States, and thus made the founding of the university possible. Originally constructed as a dormitory, the lower 14 floors were converted in 1975 into office space, while the top nine floors remained student housing.

Lincoln Tower is currently used for:

- Floors 1 through 14 are used for office space.
- Floors 15-23 are used for residence hall purposes

== Residence halls ==
The rooms in both Lincoln and Morrill are set up very differently from other dormitories on campus. Each floor consists of 6 suites, 1 laundry room, 1 resident advisor room, and 3 supply closets. Within each of the suites is a common room, bathroom (which includes three-four sinks, two showers and three restroom stalls), 4 rooms (each of which includes a study connected to a bedroom). Each suite usually has 8-12 students; rooms are quads, triples or doubles (with the exception of the suite directly next to the RA room, which has a single room in it). A typical floor is home to 60-70 students.

The elevators in each of the residence halls are divided based on a low rise and high rise system. In Morrill, the low rise elevators go to floors 1, 3–14 and the high rise elevators goes to floors 1, 3, 15–23. Only authorized officials can access floor 2 using the elevators. In Lincoln, low rise elevators reach floors 1–14 to access office space, while high rise elevators reach floors 1, 2, and 15–23 to access student living. Each side of the building has 3 elevators.

The halls are co-ed by suite.

== In popular media ==
Lincoln Tower appears in Apple, Inc.'s January 2014 ad campaign titled "Your Verse." It can be seen in the background as The Ohio State University Marching Band practices on the turf fields in the adjacent Lincoln Tower Park. The OSU Recreational and Physical Activity Center (RPAC) and McCorkle Aquatic Pavilion can also be seen in the aerial video footage.

== Gallery ==
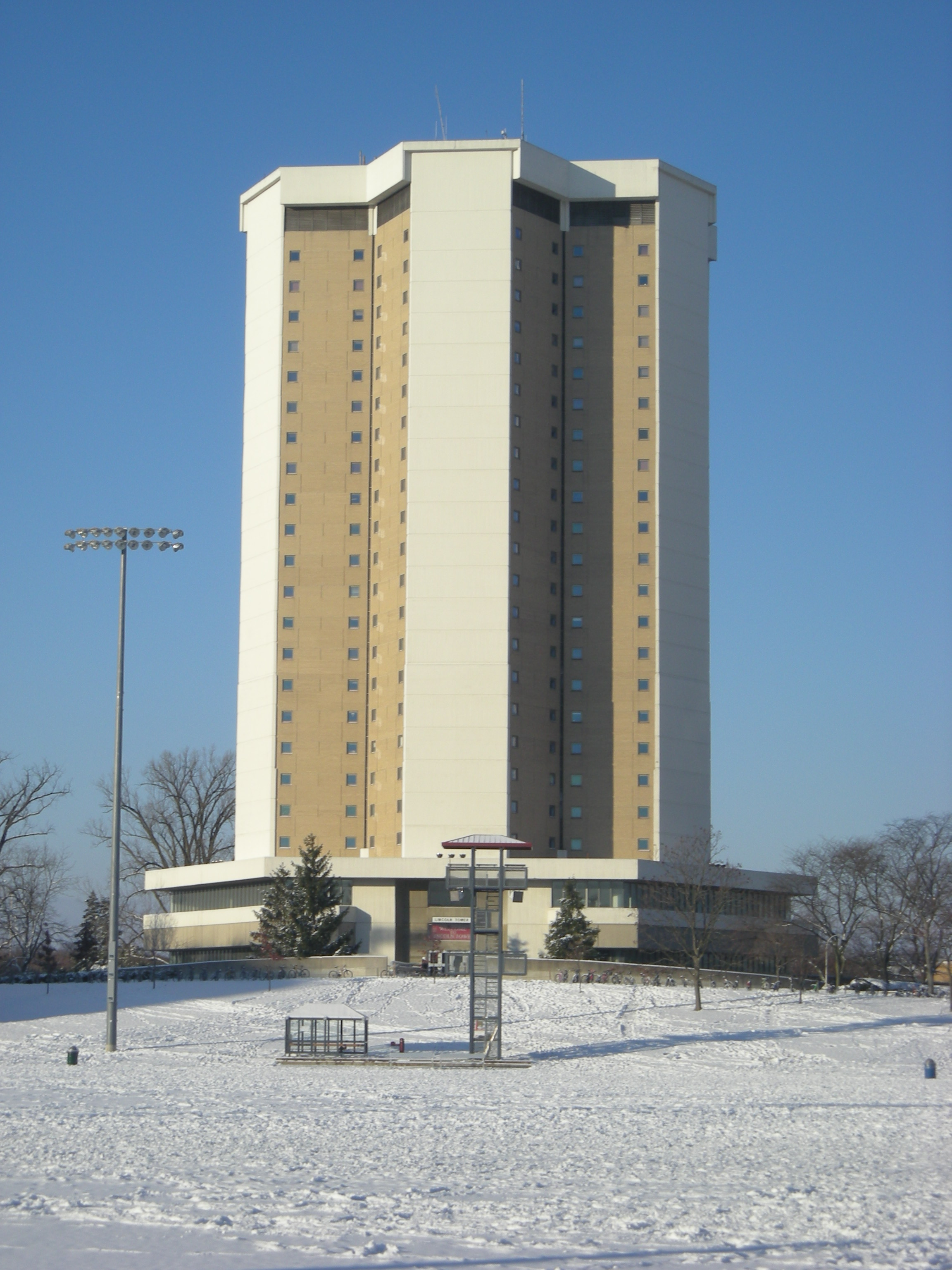
Lincoln Tower

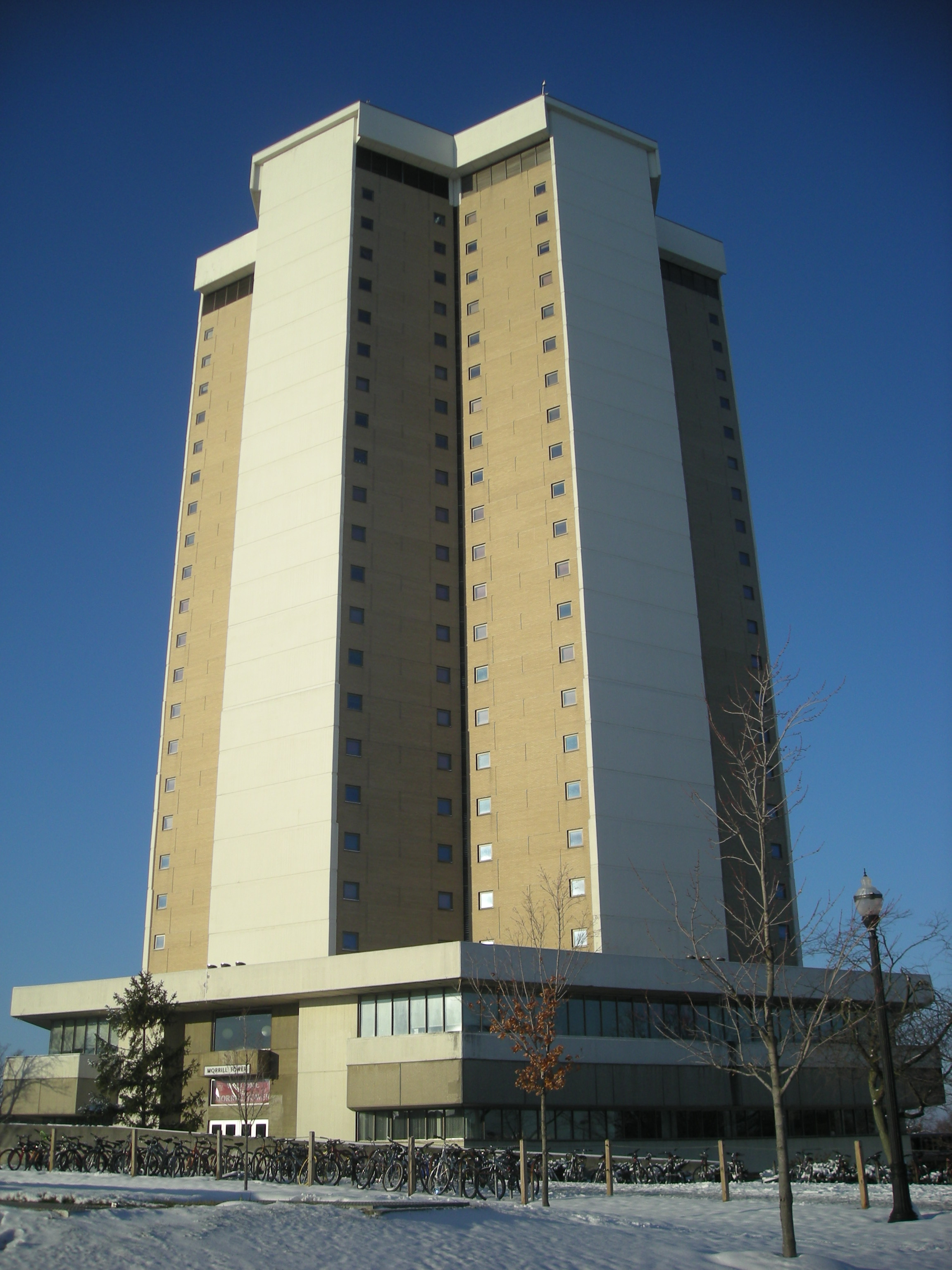
Morrill Tower
