= Capitol Square =

Public square in Columbus, Ohio

Coordinates: 39.961384°N 82.999096°W

- Public square
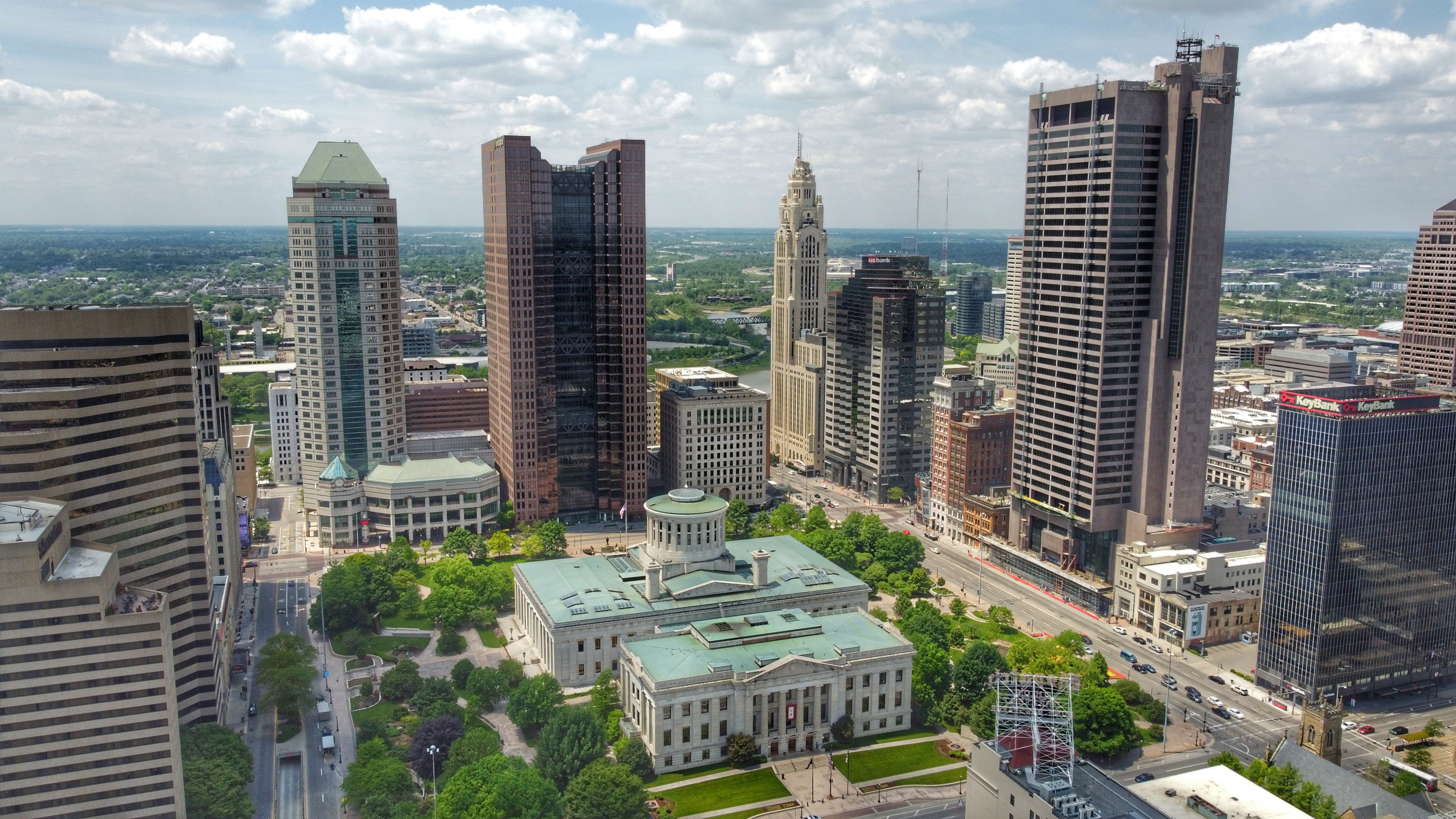

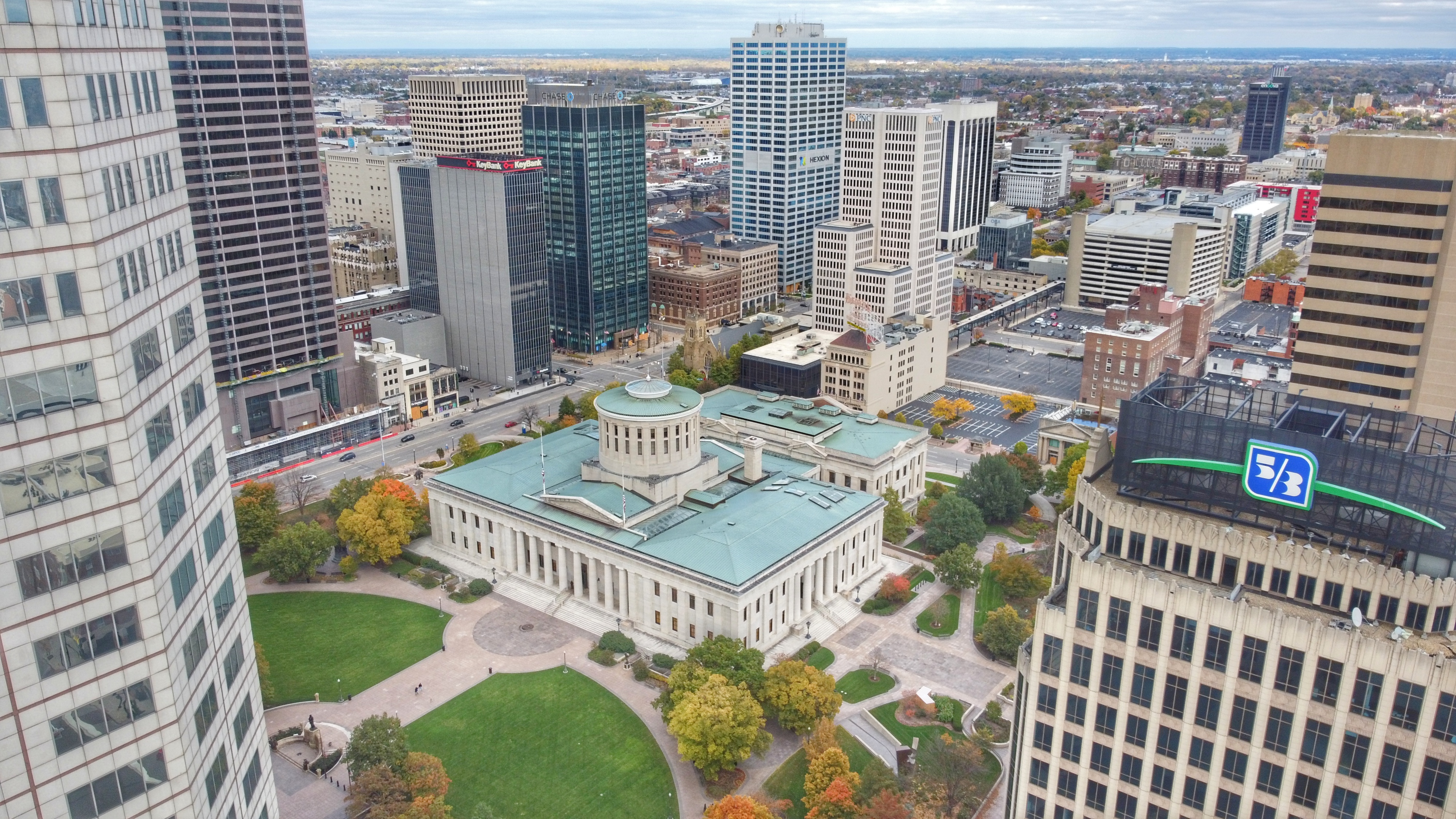
- Features: Lawns, sculptures, state capitol building
- Completed: 1861
- Area: 10 acres (4.0 ha)
- Location: Broad and High Streets (Downtown Columbus)
- Interactive map of Capitol Square

Capitol Square is a public square in Downtown Columbus, Ohio. The square includes the Ohio Statehouse, its 10-acre (4.0 ha) Capitol Grounds, as well as the buildings and features surrounding the square. The Capitol Grounds are surrounded to the north and west by Broad and High Streets. These are the main thoroughfares of the city since its founding. They form the city's 100 percent corner. The grounds are surrounded by 3rd Street to the east and State Street to the south. The oldest building on Capitol Square, the Ohio Statehouse, is the center of the state government and roughly in the geographic center of Capitol Square, Columbus and Ohio.

== History ==
The 10-acre (4.0 ha) statehouse grounds were donated by four prominent Franklinton landholders to form the new state capitol. As the city's downtown began to empty in the mid-20th century, several buildings around the square were demolished. A construction boom in downtown during the 1970s and 80s led to nearly all spaces being occupied again. Plans are to have the last empty space on 3rd Street developed by 2020.

== Attributes ==
=== Buildings and structures ===
- Center: Ohio Statehouse, Capitol Atrium, and Senate Building

High Street

- Vern Riffe Center for Government and the Arts
- Huntington Center
- Huntington National Bank Building

Broad Street

- Broad & High building
- 8 on the Square
- New Hayden Building
- Hayden Building
- Rhodes State Office Tower
- 60 E. Broad St. (former COTA office)
- 62 E. Broad St. (home to the Columbus Dispatch)
- 64-66 E. Broad St.
- Key Bank Building

Third Street

- Trinity Episcopal Church
- PNC Bank Building
- Columbus Dispatch Building
- Central Ohio Federal Savings and Loan building

State Street

- Sheraton Columbus Hotel at Capitol Square
- Capitol Square skyscraper
- Ohio Theatre
- Fifth Third Center

Street corners

- Northwest: One Columbus Center
- Northeast: Chase Tower
- Southwest: National Exchange Bank building
- Southeast: U.S. Post Office and Courthouse

Buildings formerly on Capitol Square include the Neil House hotel (three buildings which existed on the square), the Columbus Board of Trade Building, the Hartman Building and Theater, the former Columbus City Hall, former locations of the First Congregational Church and First Presbyterian Church, an early Huntington Bank, the Deshler Hotel, a prior location of the Downtown YMCA, and 5 and 7 South High Street, commercial buildings constructed c. 1840.

=== Public art ===
Interactive map of notable buildings and sculptures on the Capitol Grounds of the Ohio Statehouse. Click on points for more details.

- Governor James A. Rhodes (1982)
- The Doughboy (1930)
- Intersect (1992)
- The Newsboy (2018)
- Ohio Holocaust and Liberators Memorial (2014)
- Ohio Veterans Plaza
- Statue of Christopher Columbus (c. 1890–1892)
- The Spirit of '98 (1928)
- These Are My Jewels (1893)
- William McKinley Monument (1907)
- former: Dr. Samuel Mitchel Smith and Sons Memorial Fountain (1880)

=== Tourism ===
As the center of downtown Columbus, the square gets a high number of residents and visitors. Programs for tourists include the Columbus Art Walk's Capitol Square tour, taking visitors around historical and architectural sites, sculptures and other landmarks.

=== Events ===
==== Protests ====
Capitol Square has been the location of many protests held in the city. Recent protests included the Ohio's stay-at-home order in the COVID-19 pandemic and the handling of the murder of George Floyd. Riots and protests over George Floyd took place in the city, centered on the square from May 28 into July, with early violent protests leading to damaged storefronts across downtown Columbus, with graffiti, trash and looting around much of downtown.

== Gallery ==
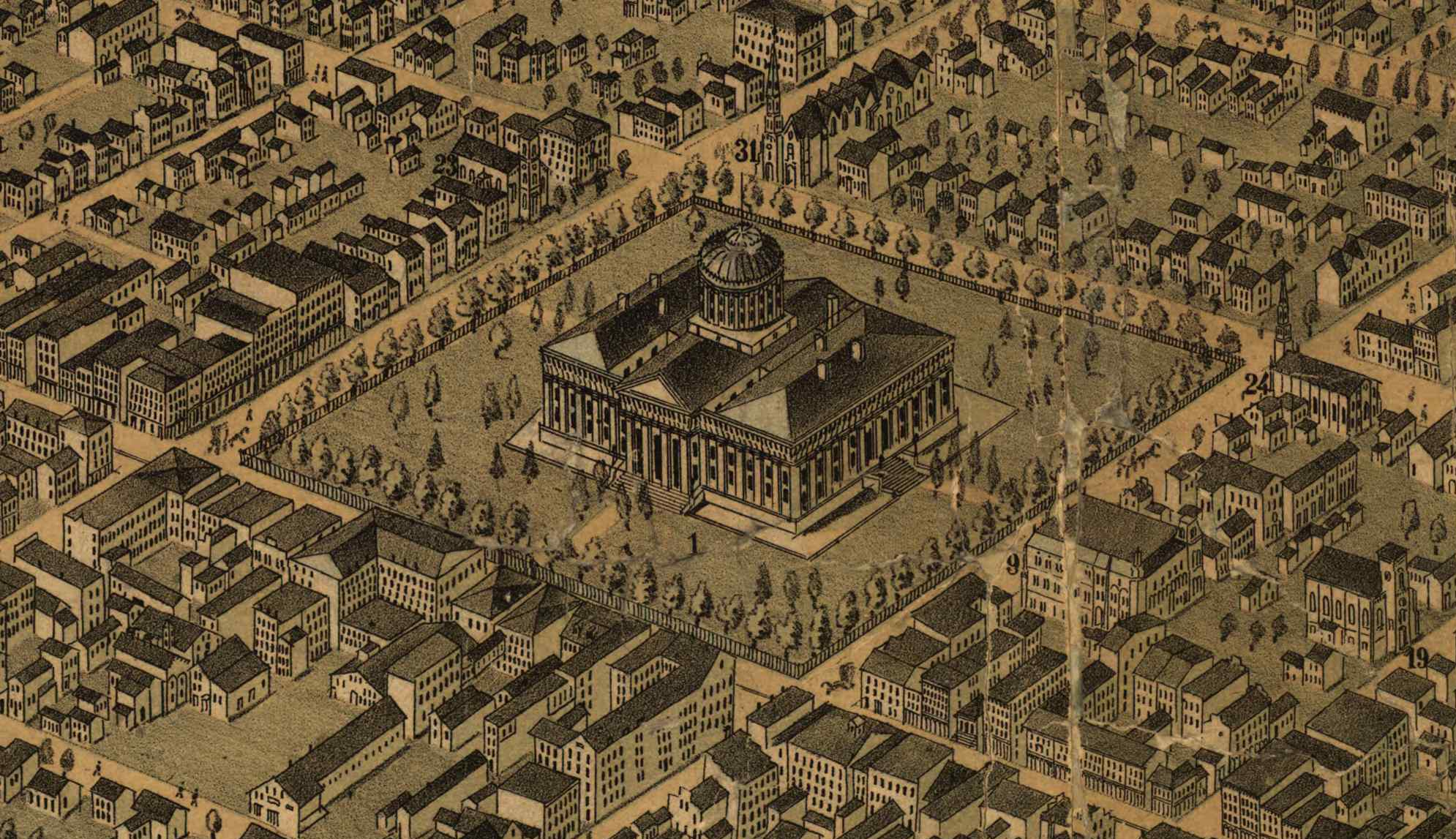
1872 bird's eye view facing northeast

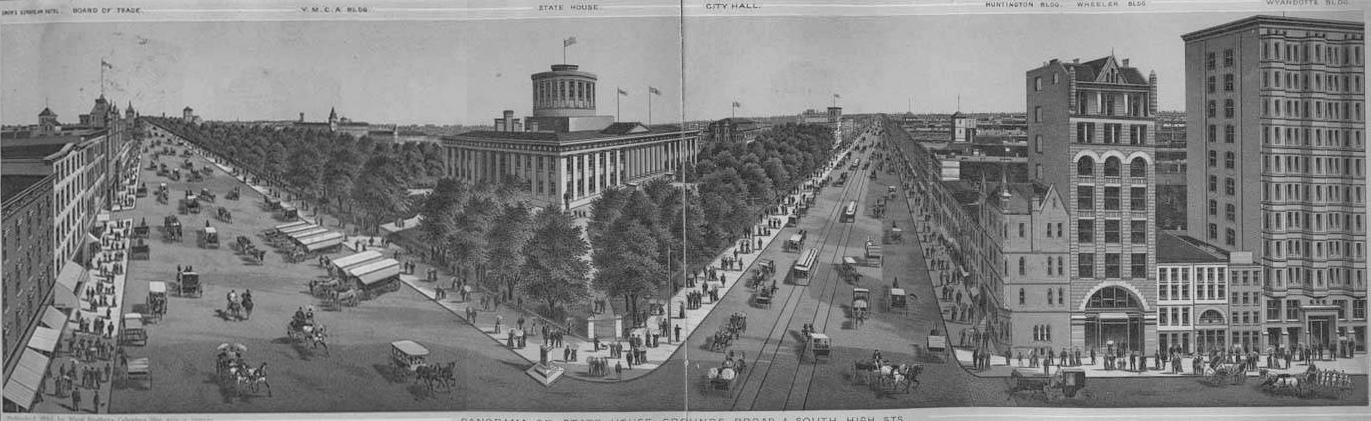
The square facing southeast in 1893

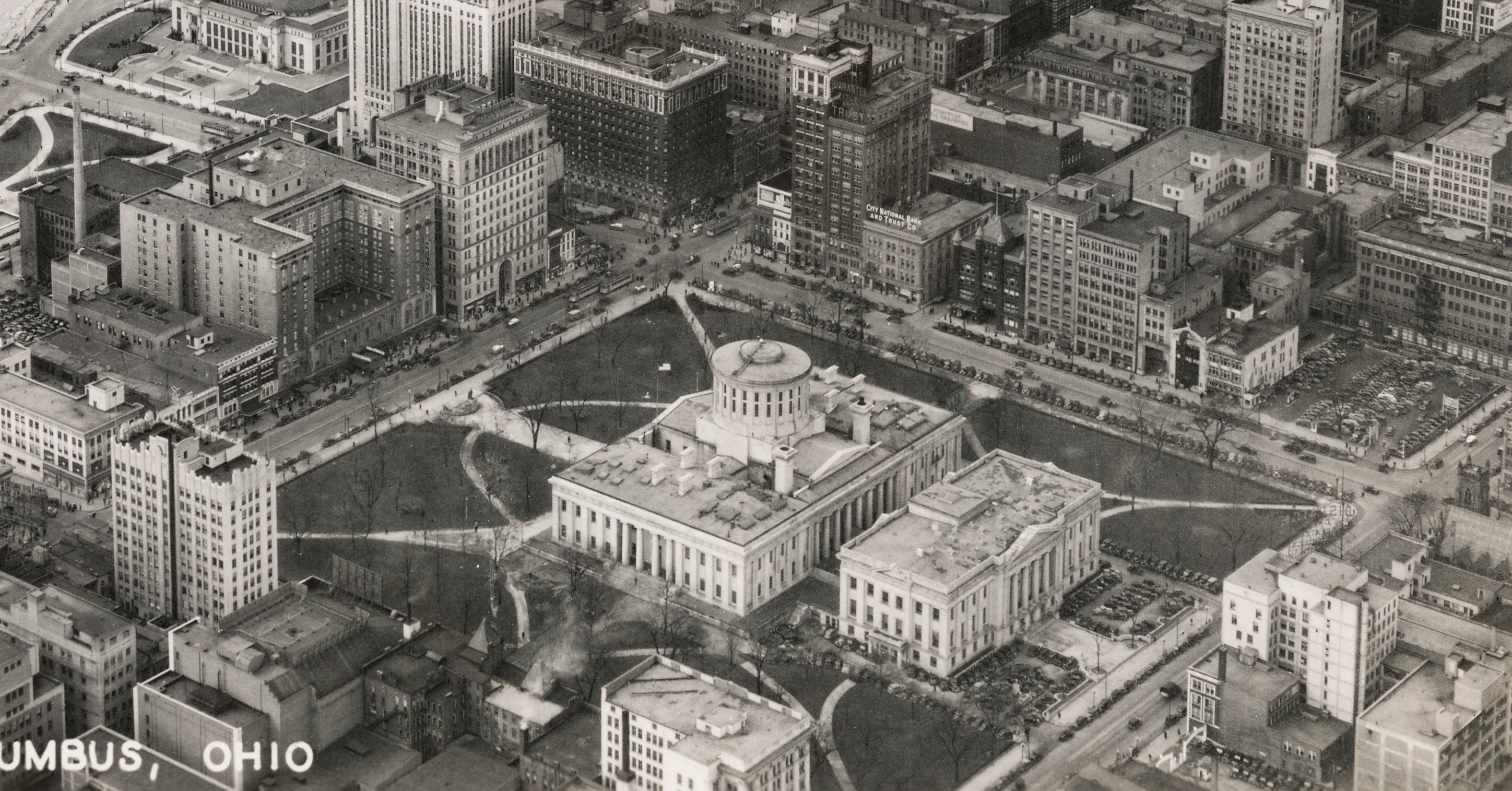
Capitol Square facing northwest, 1936

== See also ==
- Columbus Civic Center
- Capitol Square Review & Advisory Board v. Pinette
