= Ohio Holocaust and Liberators Memorial =

Memorial in Columbus, Ohio, U.S.

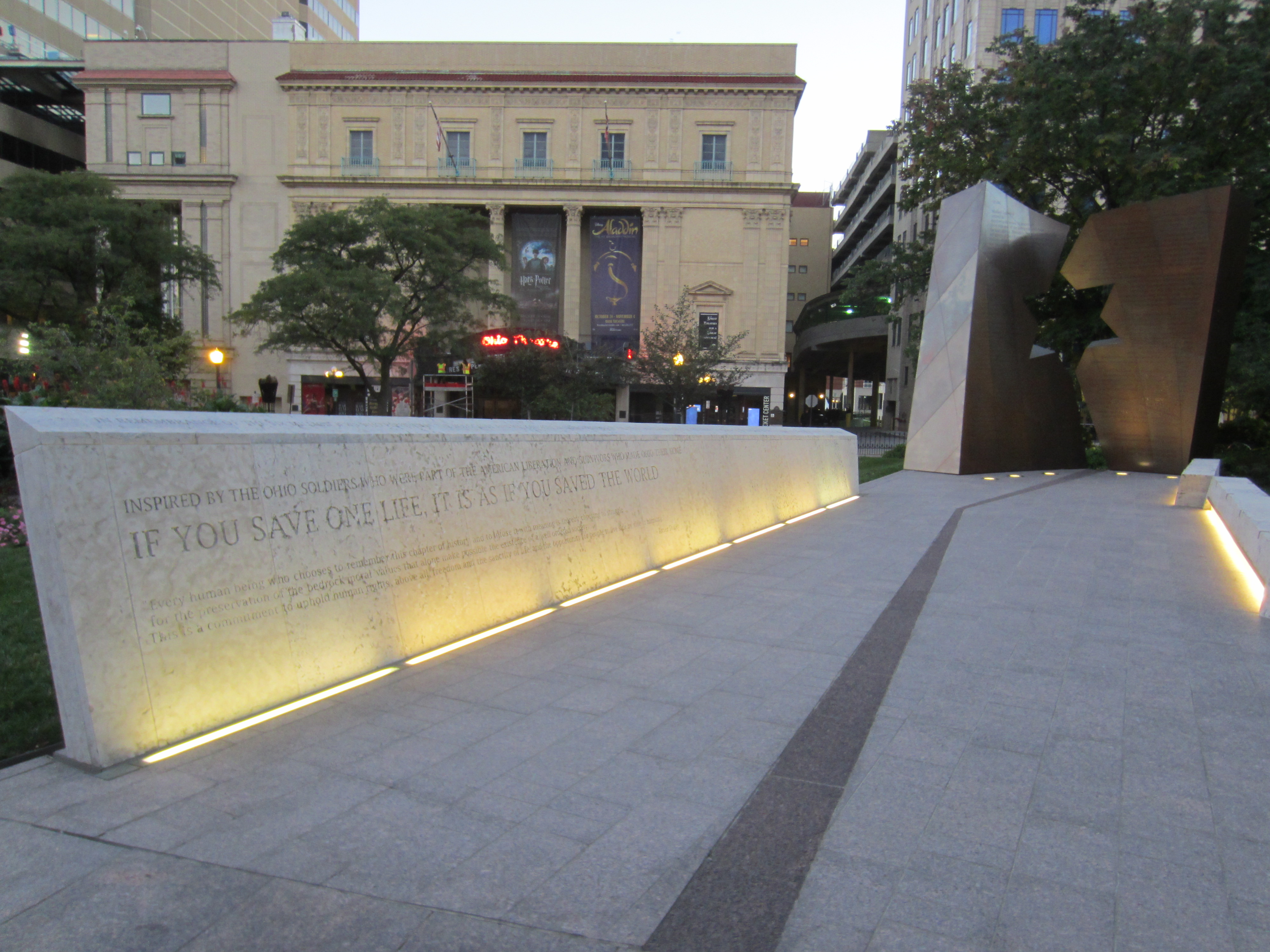
- The memorial in 2018
- Medium: Bronze; steel
- Location: Columbus, Ohio, U.S.
- 39°57′37.7″N 82°59′57.8″W

The Ohio Holocaust and Liberators Memorial is a bronze and steel Holocaust memorial installed on the Ohio Statehouse grounds, in Columbus, Ohio, United States. It was unveiled by Governor John Kasich and architect Daniel Libeskind on June 2, 2014.

== Description ==
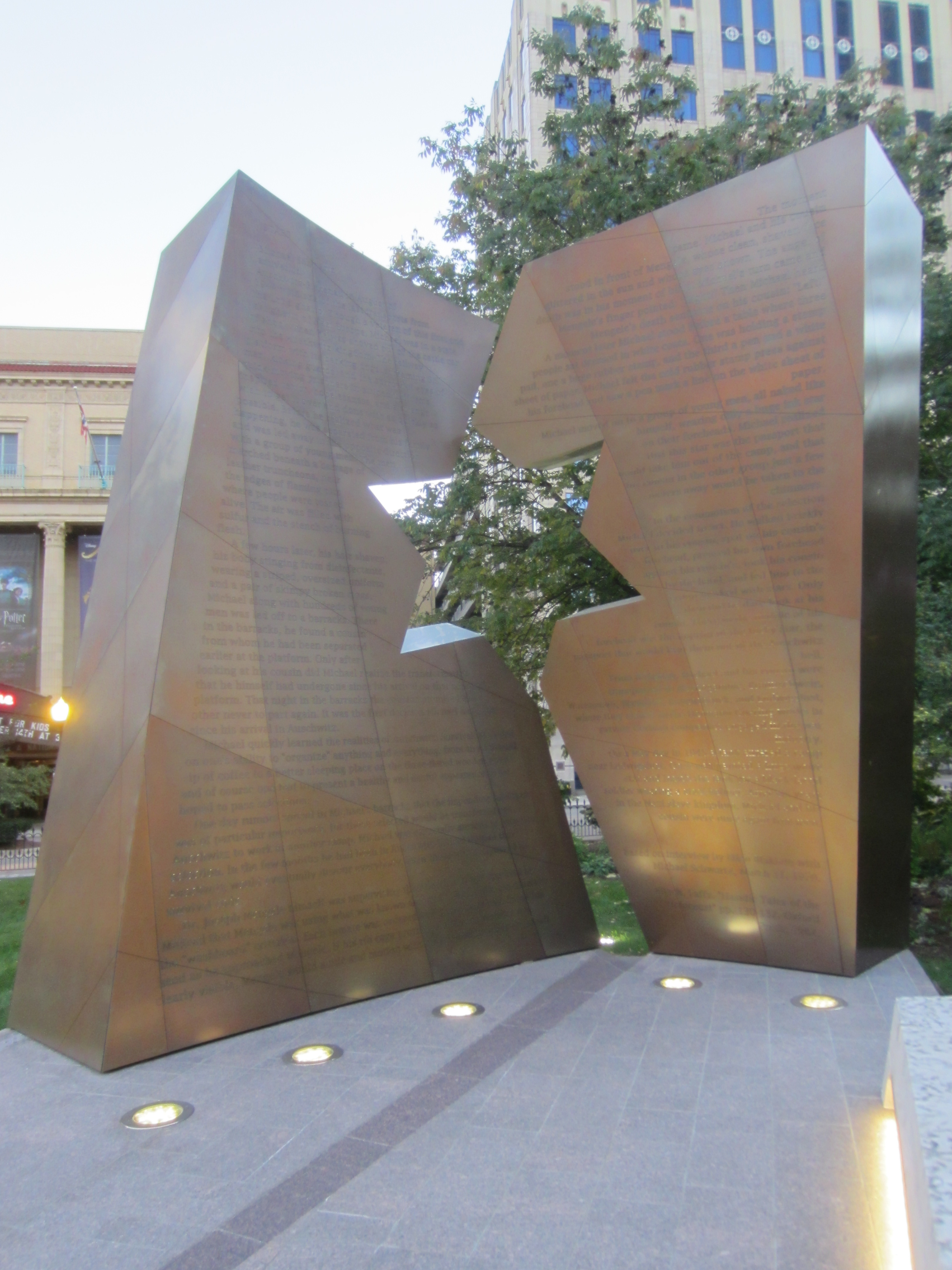
The sculpture, 2018

An inscription on the top of the stone wall reads:

"In remembrance of the six million Jews who perished in the Holocaust and millions more including prisoners of war, ethnic and religious minorities, Freemasons, homosexuals, the mentally ill, developmentally disabled, and political dissidents who suffered under Nazi Germany."

Another on the front of the wall reads:

"Inspired by the Ohio soldiers who were part of the American liberation and survivors who made Ohio their home – if you save one life, it is as if you saved the world."

== See also ==
- 2014 in art
