= Ohio Statehouse =

State capitol building of the U.S. state of Ohio

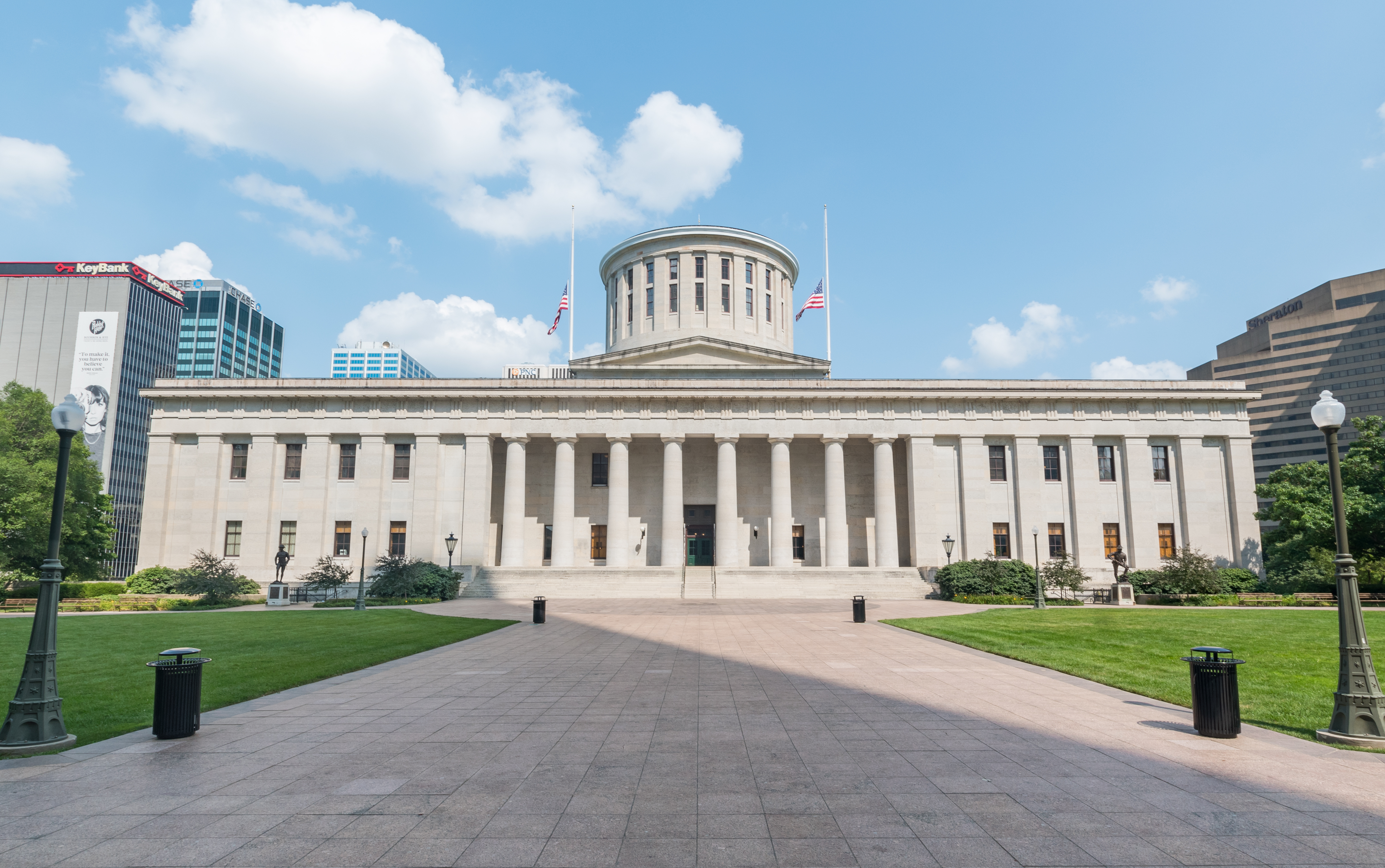
- West facade of the Ohio Statehouse
- Location: 1 Capitol Square, Columbus, Ohio
- Coordinates: 39°57′41″N 82°59′56″W
- Visitors: 500,000 (in 2012)
- Public transit access: multiple routes: 1, 2, 3, 6, 8, 9, 10, 12, 13, 41, 42, 43, 44, 73, 74, 102, AirConnect, CMAX; CoGo
- Parking: Underground lot
- Website: www.ohiostatehouse.org
- Interactive map of Ohio Statehouse

History
- Built: 1839–1861

Site notes
- Area: 10 acres (4.0 ha)
- Architect: Multiple
- Architectural style: Greek Revival

U.S. National Historic Landmark
- Designated: December 22, 1977
- Reference no.: 72001011

U.S. National Register of Historic Places
- Designated: July 31, 1972
- Reference no.: 72001011

Columbus Register of Historic Properties
- Designated: November 15, 1982
- Reference no.: CR-13

The Ohio Statehouse is the state capitol building and seat of government for the U.S. state of Ohio. The Greek Revival building is located on Capitol Square in downtown Columbus. The capitol houses the Ohio General Assembly, consisting of the House of Representatives and the Senate. It also contains the ceremonial offices of the governor, lieutenant governor, state treasurer, and state auditor. Built between 1839 and 1861, it is one of the oldest working statehouses in the United States. The statehouse grounds include two other buildings, the Judiciary Annex or Senate Building, and the Atrium; the three are collectively referred to as the Ohio Statehouse into the present day.

The statehouse's prominent architecture has earned it several landmark designations, including as a National Historic Landmark. The building sees about 500,000 visitors per year.

== History ==
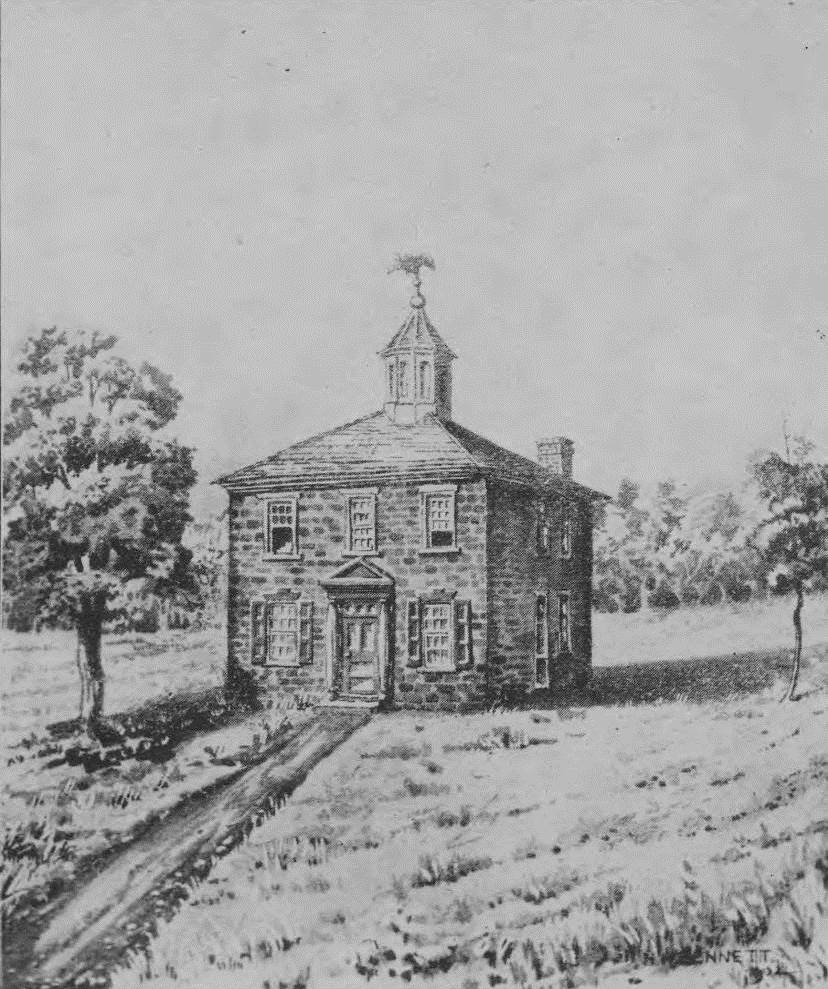
First statehouse, in Chillicothe

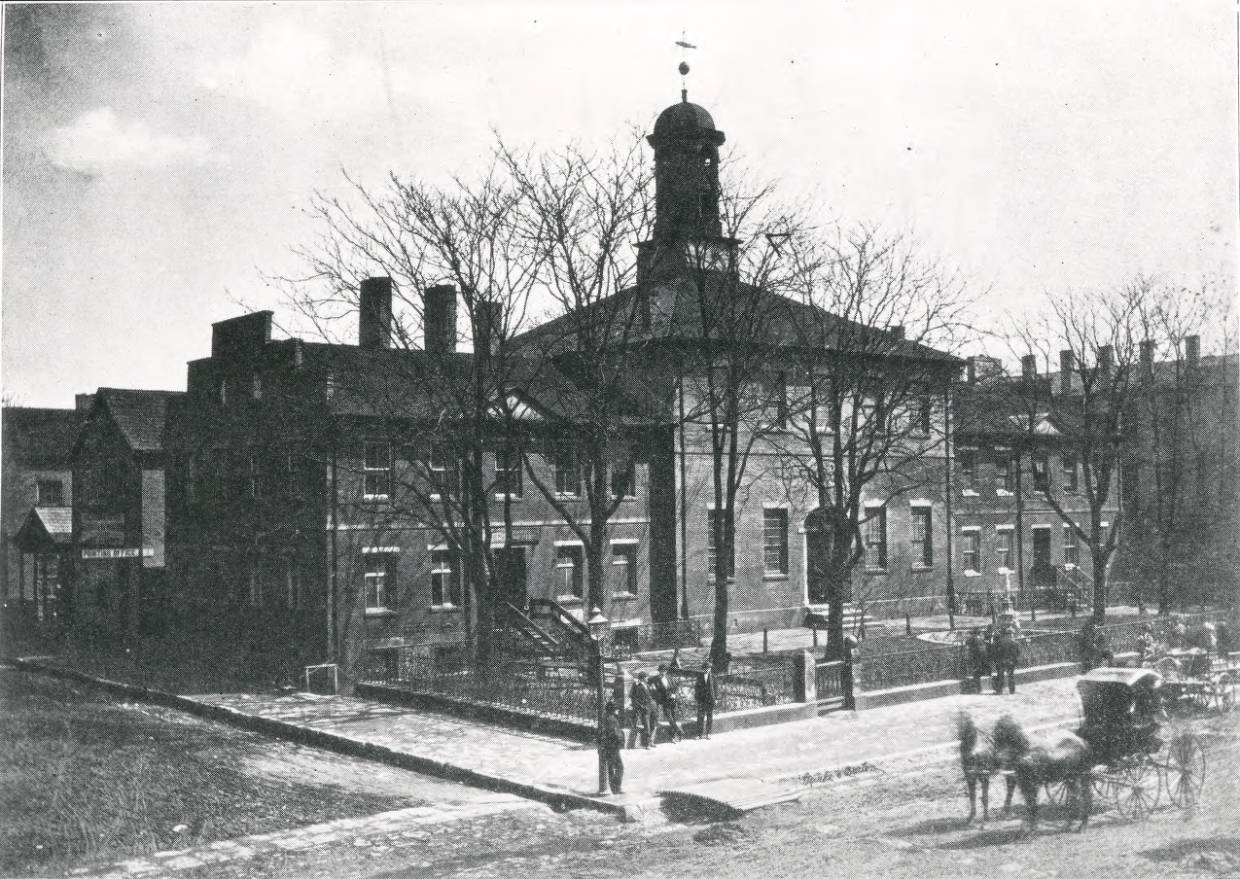
Second statehouse, in Zanesville

Chillicothe was Ohio's first state capital, from 1803. Due to political fighting among state leaders, the Ohio General Assembly temporarily moved the capital to Zanesville in 1810. Legislation enacted in that year provided for the selection of a new state capital "not more than 40 miles (64 km) from what may be deemed the common center of the state." In 1812, the General Assembly restored Chillicothe as the temporary state capital until the new capitol could be built.

State leaders faced ongoing pressure to make the capital city more accessible by moving it closer to the center of the state. In response, the legislature appointed a committee to evaluate potential options for the new capital city. Four prominent Franklinton area land owners proposed a largely empty tract of land across the river from Franklinton. The land owners offered to donate two 10-acre (4.0 ha) parcels of land to the state and proposed spending up to $50,000 to build structures and make other improvements to the area.

On February 14, 1812, the General Assembly created a new capital city on the "High Banks opposite Franklinton at the Forks of the Scioto most known as Wolf's Ridge". Approximately a week later, after intense debate, the legislature selected Columbus as the name of the new town. In the following months the new town was surveyed and laid out in rectangular grid. The layout set aside two 10-acre parcels of land, one for a statehouse, at the location of the present day Statehouse, and the other parcel would become the site of the Ohio Penitentiary. Public sale of town lots for the new city began in June 1812. In 1816, the General Assembly met in Columbus for the first time in a brick building on the corner of High and State Streets.

The land for the eventual permanent statehouse was planned during the initial platting of the city. 10 acres were selected, and Jarvis Pike was hired to clear the land and enclose it in a stake-and-rider fence. In return, Pike was allowed to grow corn and wheat on the plot for years.

=== Design and construction ===
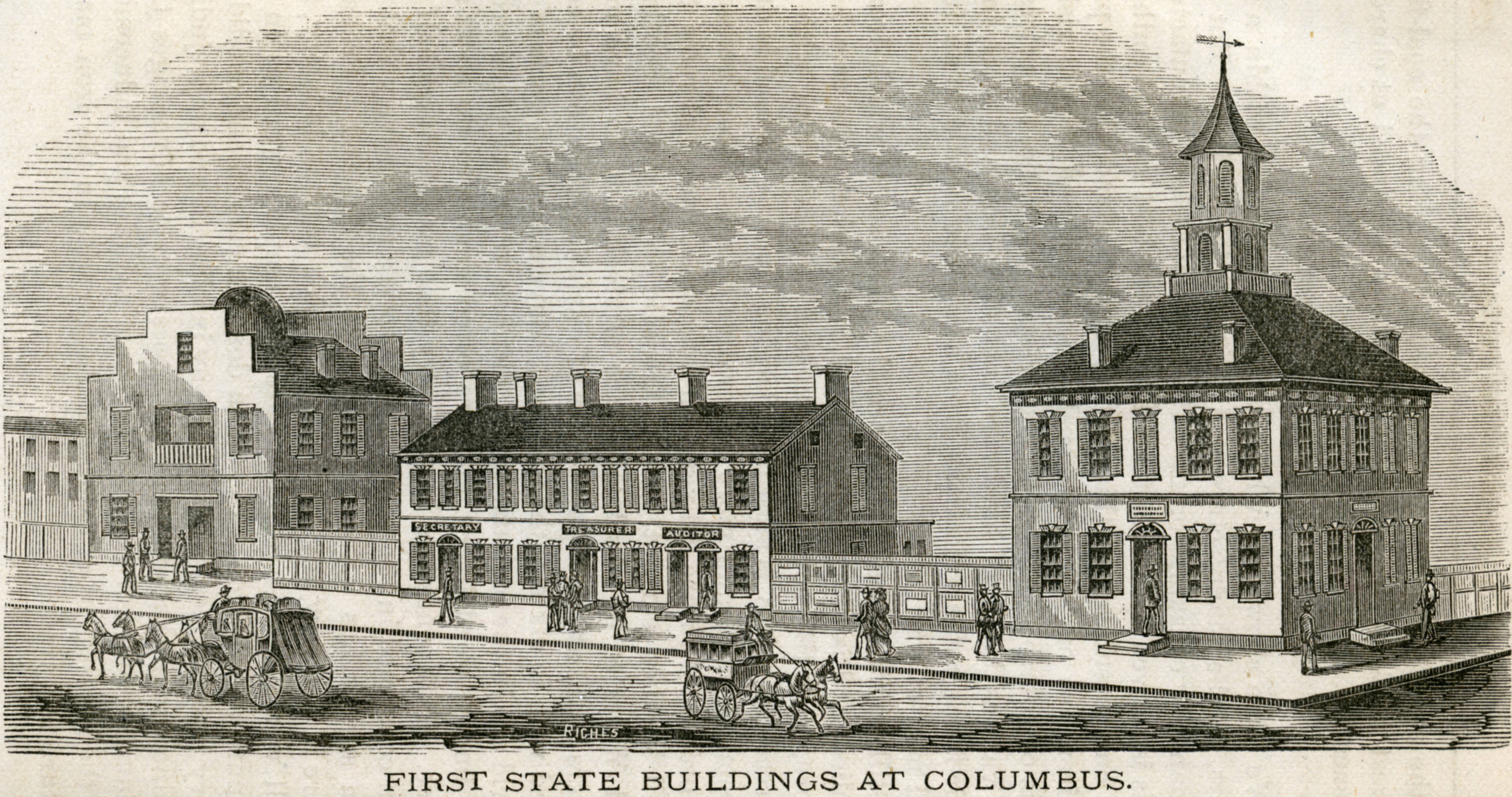
First statehouse in Columbus (right) alongside other government buildings

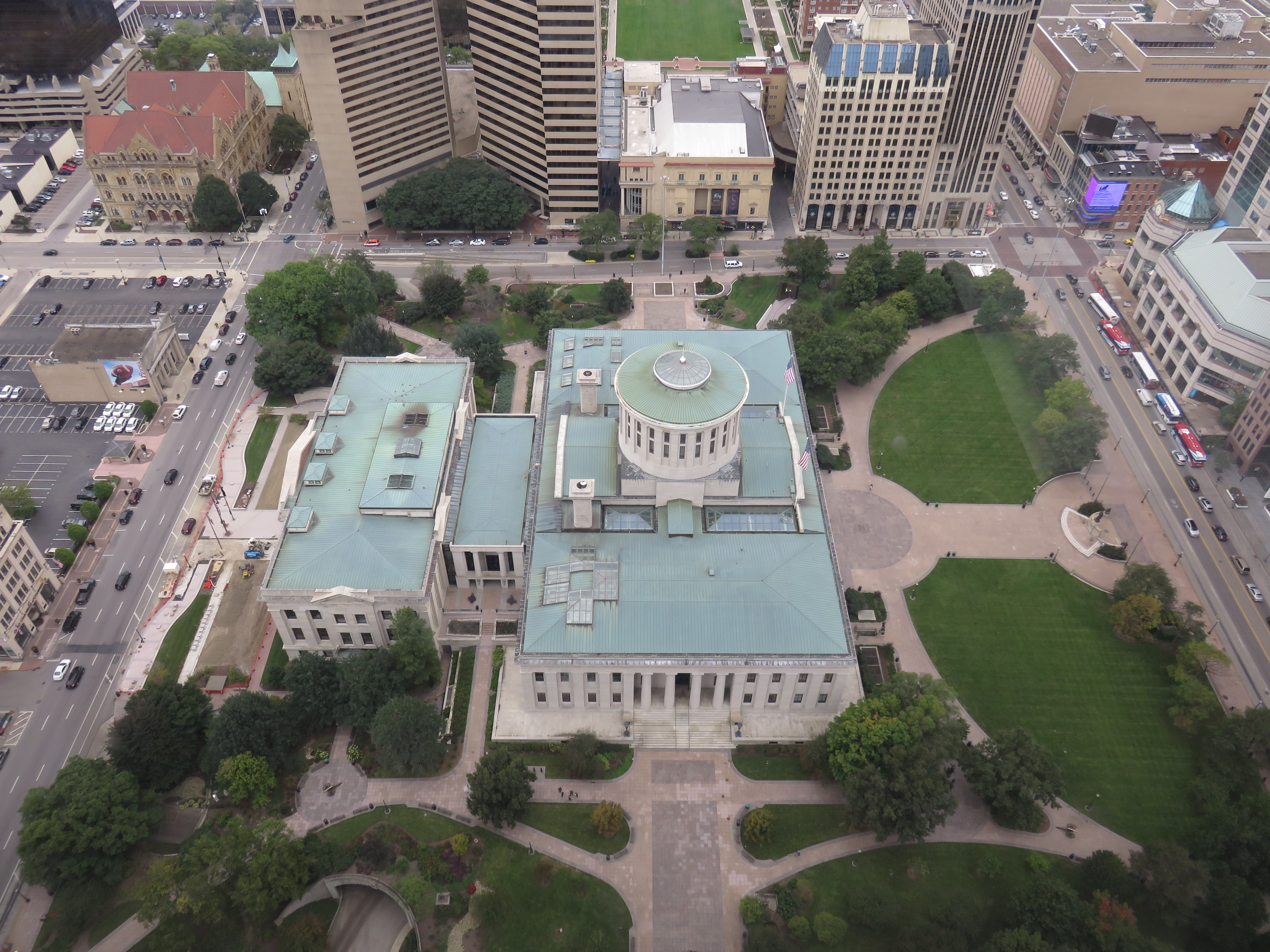
Aerial view of the statehouse and its grounds

In 1838, Ohio's government announced a competition to select the design for a new Statehouse. This strategy was not unusual at the time, as important public buildings such as the U.S. Capitol had resulted from similar contests. From about fifty entries, three winners were selected: first prize was awarded to Henry Walter of Cincinnati, the second to Martin Thompson of New York, and the third to painter Thomas Cole, also of New York. However, the organizing commission responsible for choosing the winners was unable to agree on a final design for construction.

When the cornerstone was laid on July 4, 1839, the commission was still without a final design. Consultation with New York architect Alexander Jackson Davis resulted in a composite design that merged some key features of the three winning entries, but it was rejected as being too expensive. Henry Walter, the first-place winner of the design contest, was chosen to supervise construction of the new capitol and he began working on another composite design that was based largely on the design of third-place winner, Thomas Cole. Cole had a personal friendship with one of the commissioners, a man named William A. Adams who was from Steubenville. Cole's nephew, William Henry Bayless, a Steubenville native, was apprenticed in the office of Alexander Jackson Davis.

Work on the building's foundation and lower level had only just begun when the Statehouse project encountered the first of many difficulties. The legislation that made Columbus the official capital city of Ohio was set to expire. While various factions within the government engaged in debate over relocating the capitol to another city, construction of the Statehouse was stopped. Open excavations were refilled with earth, and Capitol Square became open pasture for livestock.

The Statehouse remained neglected until February, 1848, when William Russell West and J.O. Sawyer of Cincinnati were appointed architects and general supervisors of the project. By May of that same year construction had resumed. A cholera epidemic began in Columbus, prompting widespread flight to the countryside by residents. Once the epidemic subsided, work on the Statehouse continued, interrupted only by intermissions during the harsh Ohio winters. Comparing plans of the various architects it is apparent that perhaps the most striking change and one that has endured in the finished building, was that West and Sawyer eliminated the rounded dome that all previous designers had suggested for the building, instead replacing it with a low conical roof.

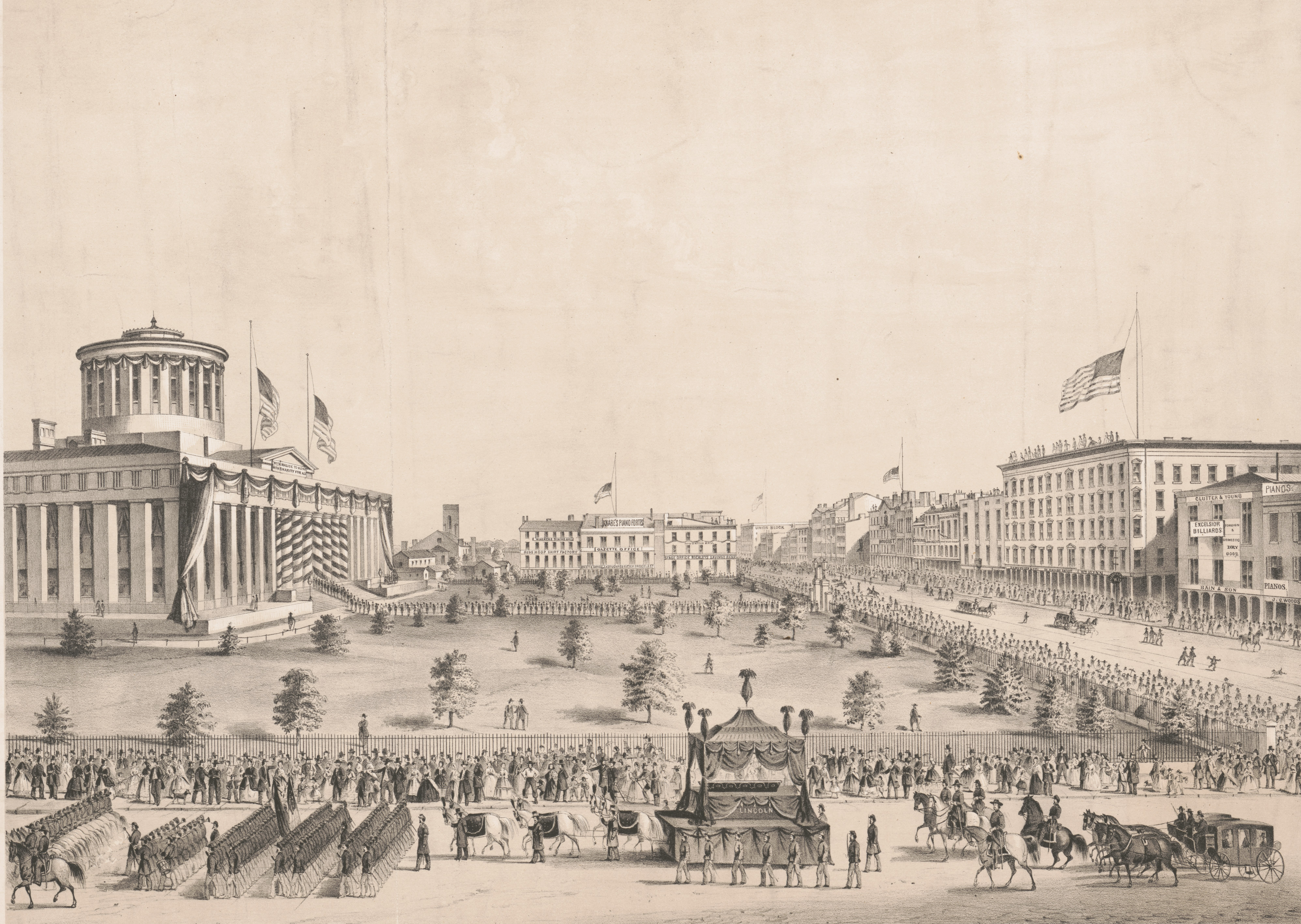
Public viewing of Abraham Lincoln at the Statehouse, April 29, 1865

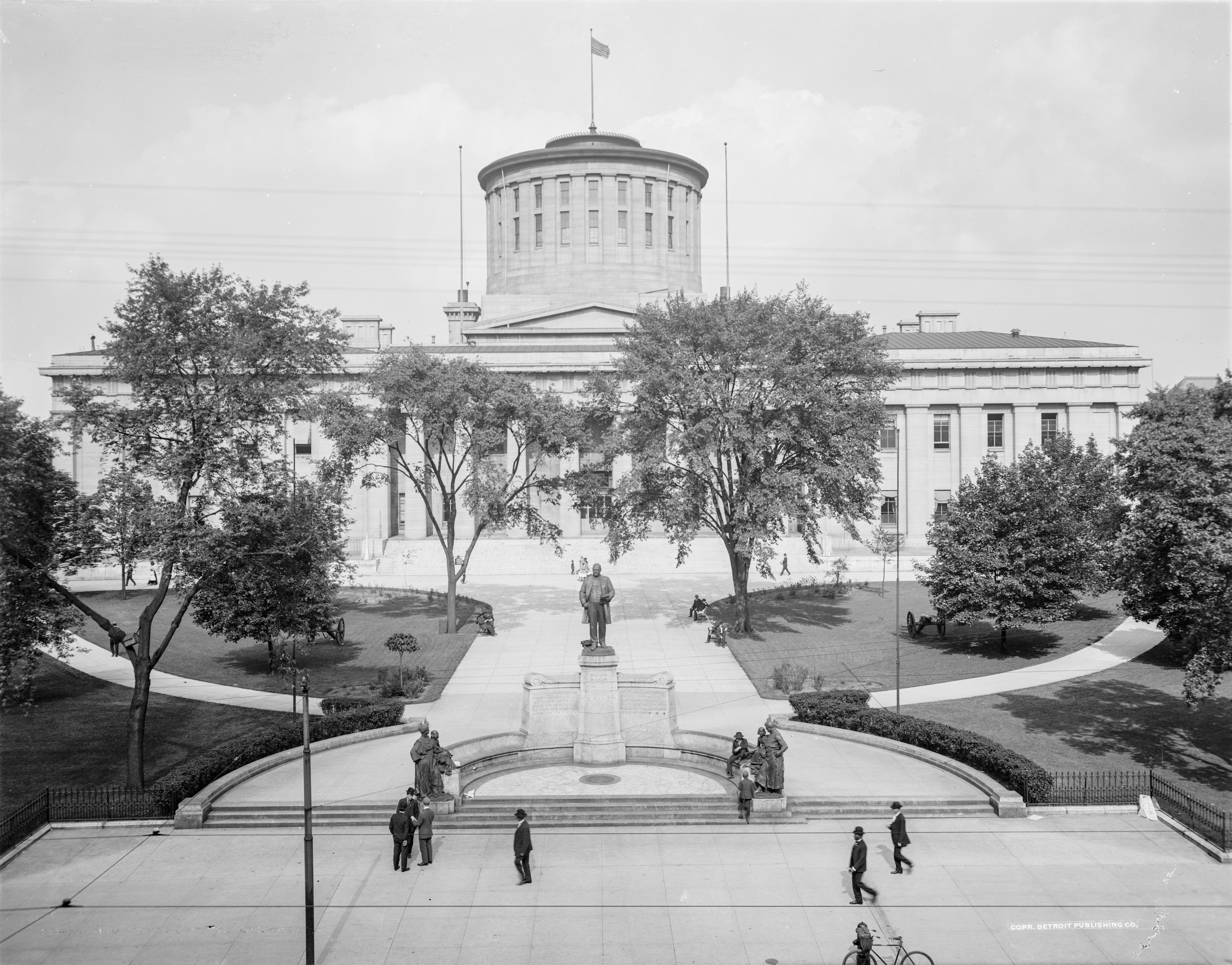
Statehouse west facade, c. 1900-1910

Fire consumed the old two-story capitol building in 1852, which created a new urgency to complete the Statehouse project as government offices were forced to relocate to various buildings around Columbus. While some suspected arson, the exact cause of the fire remains a mystery to this day. With the Statehouse exterior nearing completion by 1854, Columbus architect Nathan Kelley was hired to supervise the design and construction of the building's interiors. One of his major tasks would be to provide a system for heating and ventilation in the building, which had not been considered previously. An innovative steam heating system was constructed, with warmed air moved through the building in what Kelley called "air sewers"—small passages made of bricks that linked the various floors of the building. With great fanfare, the new Statehouse opened to the public on January 7, 1857, and soon thereafter the Ohio General Assembly convened in their new chambers. Most of the building was completed, with the notable exception of the rotunda. Although actual work on the building was proceeding smoothly, government officials were deeply dissatisfied with Kelley, citing problems with his working methods and aesthetic choices.

Isaiah Rogers, a well known architect based in Cincinnati at the time, was recruited to supervise the final stages of the Statehouse's construction. During his tenure, Rogers oversaw completion of the building's interior and coordinated work on the distinctive rotunda and its enclosing cupola. One of the building's most distinctive exterior features is the low, conical roof atop the cupola, positioned where many viewers expect to see a dome. In the long span between beginning construction on the Statehouse and its completion, the "finished" design changed many times and various proposals included a round dome atop the building. Rogers, in deciding not to use a dome, was actually reverting to a design scheme by architects West and Sawyer. In the end, the building featured a low conical roof that some critics would deride as "a Chinese hat." Construction of Capitol Square, including its buildings, grounds, and landscaping, was finally completed in 1861.

=== Changes and expansion ===
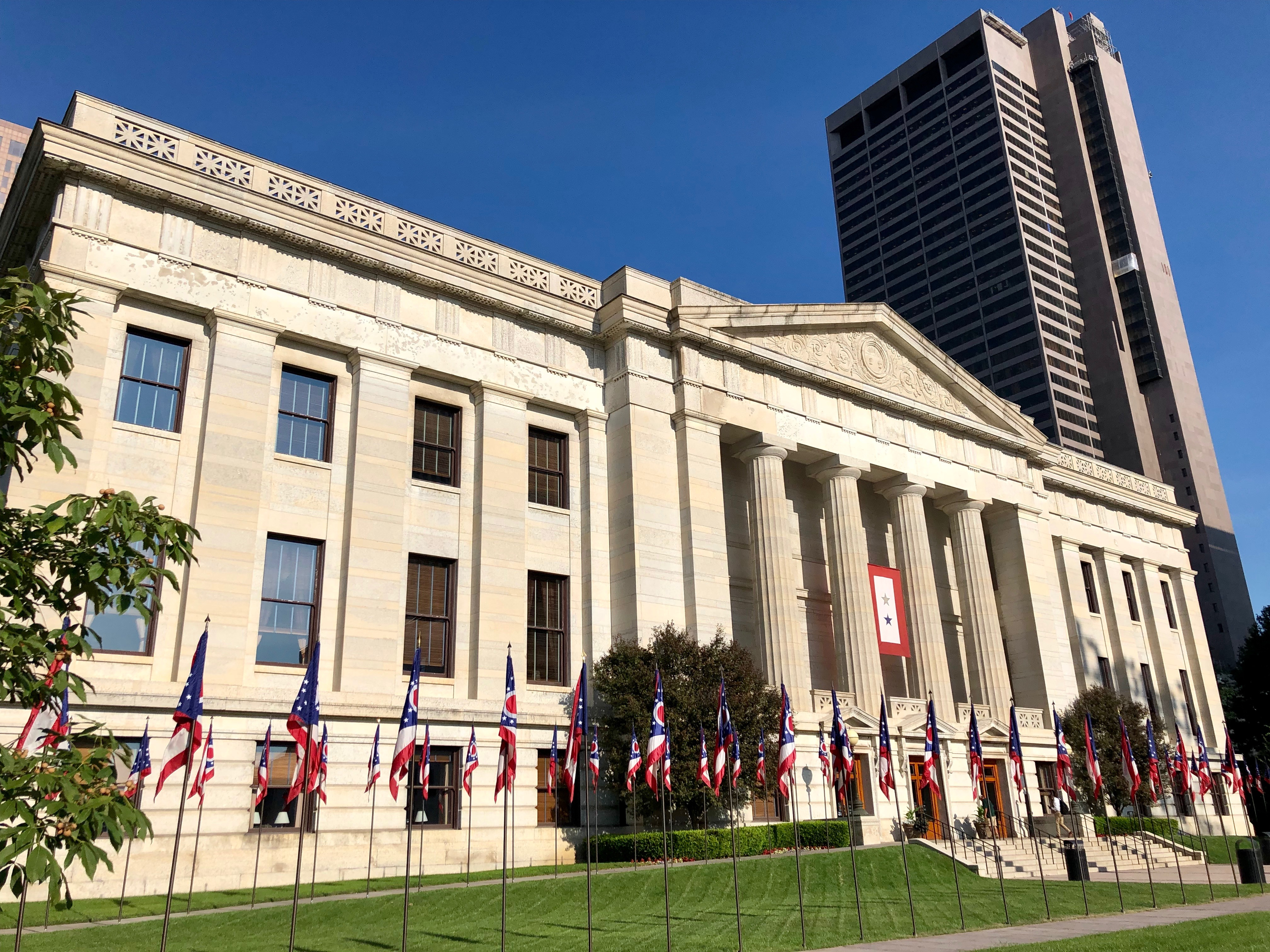
The Ohio Senate Building (former Judiciary Annex)

As the function of state government changed and expanded, changes and expansions occurred at the Ohio Statehouse. Originally, the building was the main location for all aspects of state government. As more offices and work rooms were required, large spaces would be subdivided into smaller areas. The most prominent example was the conversion to offices of the four open courts that occupied areas on the interior of the building. These open areas were from top to bottom of the structure and were intended to admit light and fresh air to the inner reaches of the building. The advent of electric lighting coupled with the need for space meant that levels of offices would come to occupy these large open areas. The fifty-four rooms the building originally held increased to 317 rooms by 1989.

In 1901, facing significant crowding several changes were considered including a completely new statehouse designed to more closely resemble the national Capitol building in Washington. Cost prohibitive, it was decided that the Ohio Supreme Court would move to a separate building on the east side of Capitol Square, and to give the court the prestige of its own building. The new building, named the Judiciary Annex, was constructed of the same Columbus limestone as the Statehouse. Neoclassical on the exterior, the interior spaces, especially the grand central staircase are Beaux Arts in style. The building was the work of Cincinnati architect Samuel Hannaford, and was completed in two years at the cost of $375,000. By comparison, the Statehouse itself took 22 years from start to finish and cost approximately $1.3 million. The difference in cost and time to completion indicates differences in how the buildings were constructed. The Statehouse is more akin to a castle or cathedral, with thick load-bearing walls of stone. The Annex was a modern building with a metal girder skeleton and was planned for the use of electric light. The building retains many of its original light fixtures, while those in the Statehouse are reproductions of the gas lights that were removed to make room for electrical appliances in the 1890s.

Murals painted by William Mark Young for the Ohio State Exhibit at the 1933 A Century of Progress International Exposition, (also known as the Chicago World's Fair) were subsequently moved to the building.

=== Restoration ===
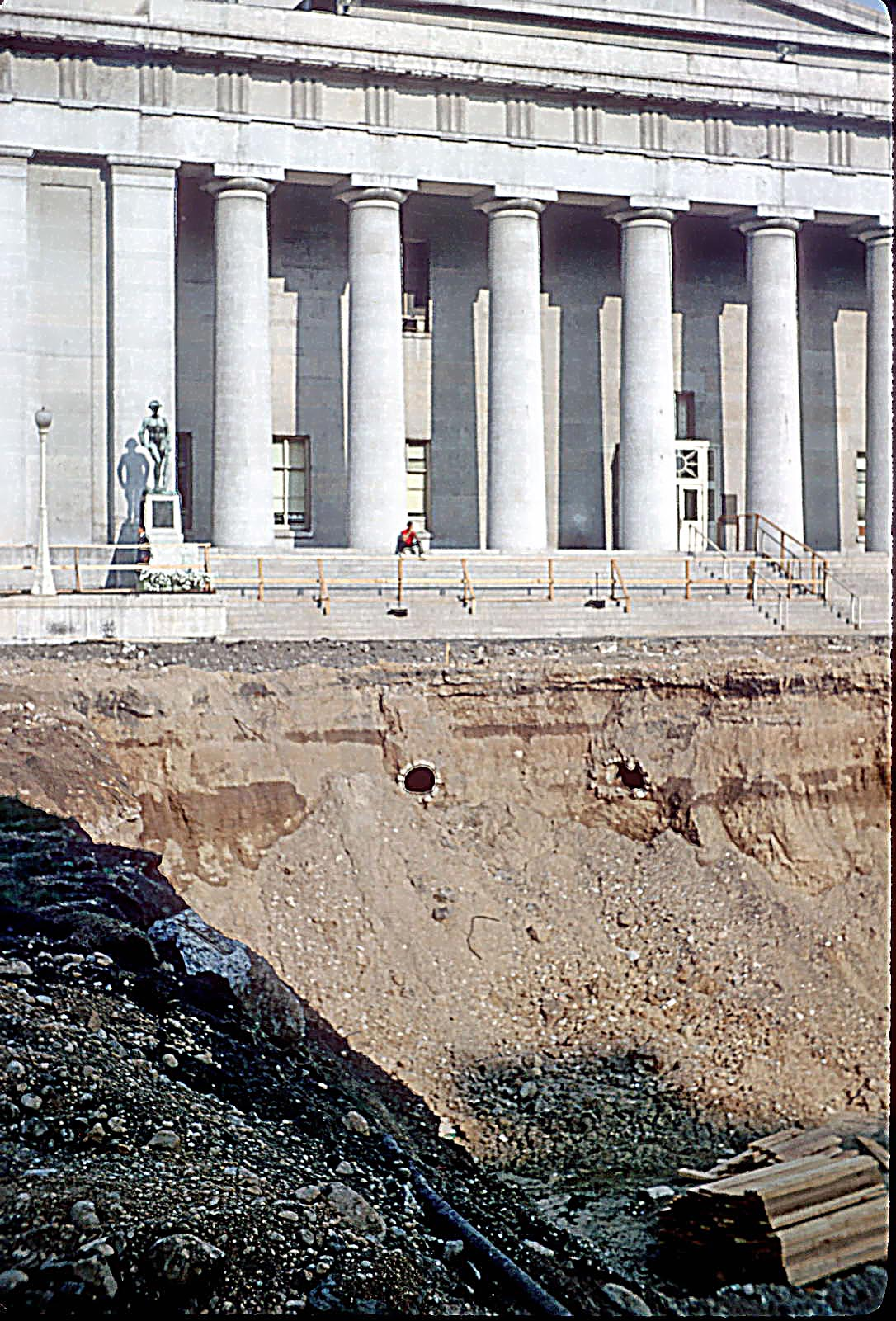
Excavation for the Statehouse's underground parking garage, 1963

The two buildings became crowded, and decay from heavy usage and inadequate maintenance was evident. Both buildings survived despite proposals made to either demolish one or both buildings, or remodel them substantially. In 1989, a massive project commenced to restore the buildings to the splendor their original builders envisioned as well as make them useful and practical government buildings. Original furniture was sought for return to the building when possible and modern reproductions of long gone items such as carpets and light fixtures were created. The large scale light fixtures in the House and Senate were based in large part on surviving period fixtures in the Vermont State House, which was being restored at the same time. The restoration project also resulted in the addition of a third building to Capitol Square. The Atrium, which connected the Statehouse with the Judiciary Annex, was completed in 1993. After the renovation, the Judiciary Annex became the Senate Building.

== Description ==
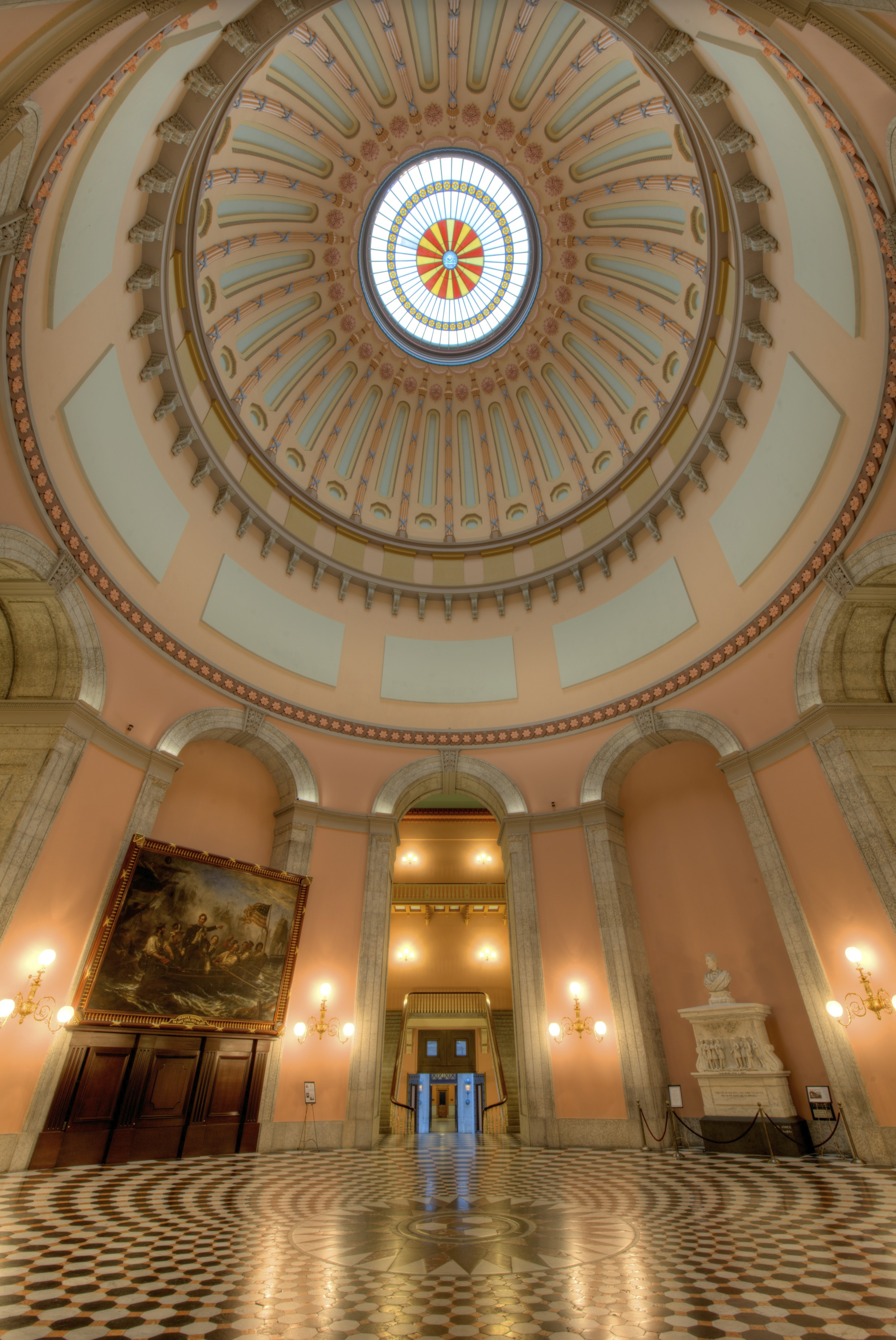
The Rotunda

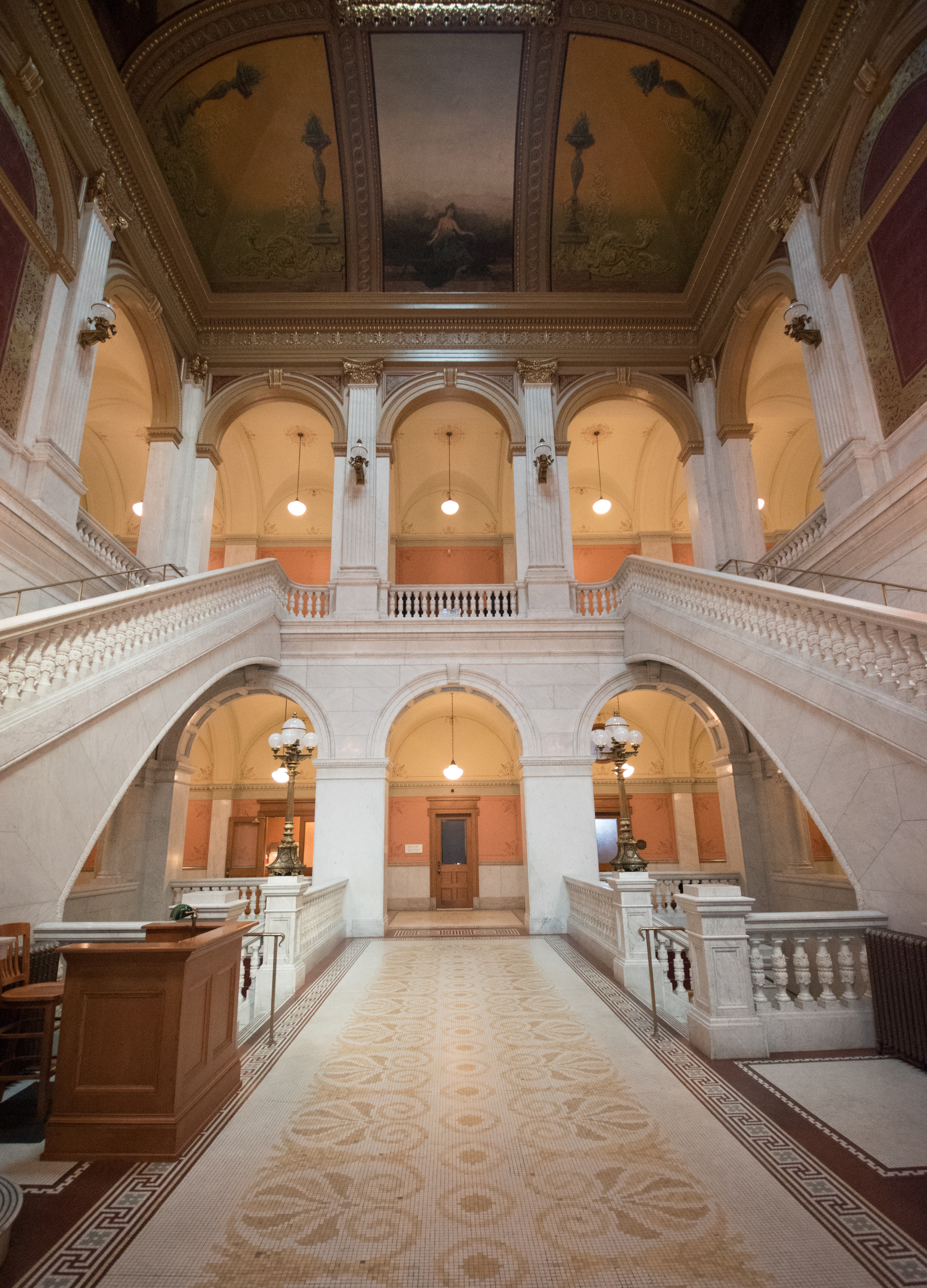
Grand Stair Hall

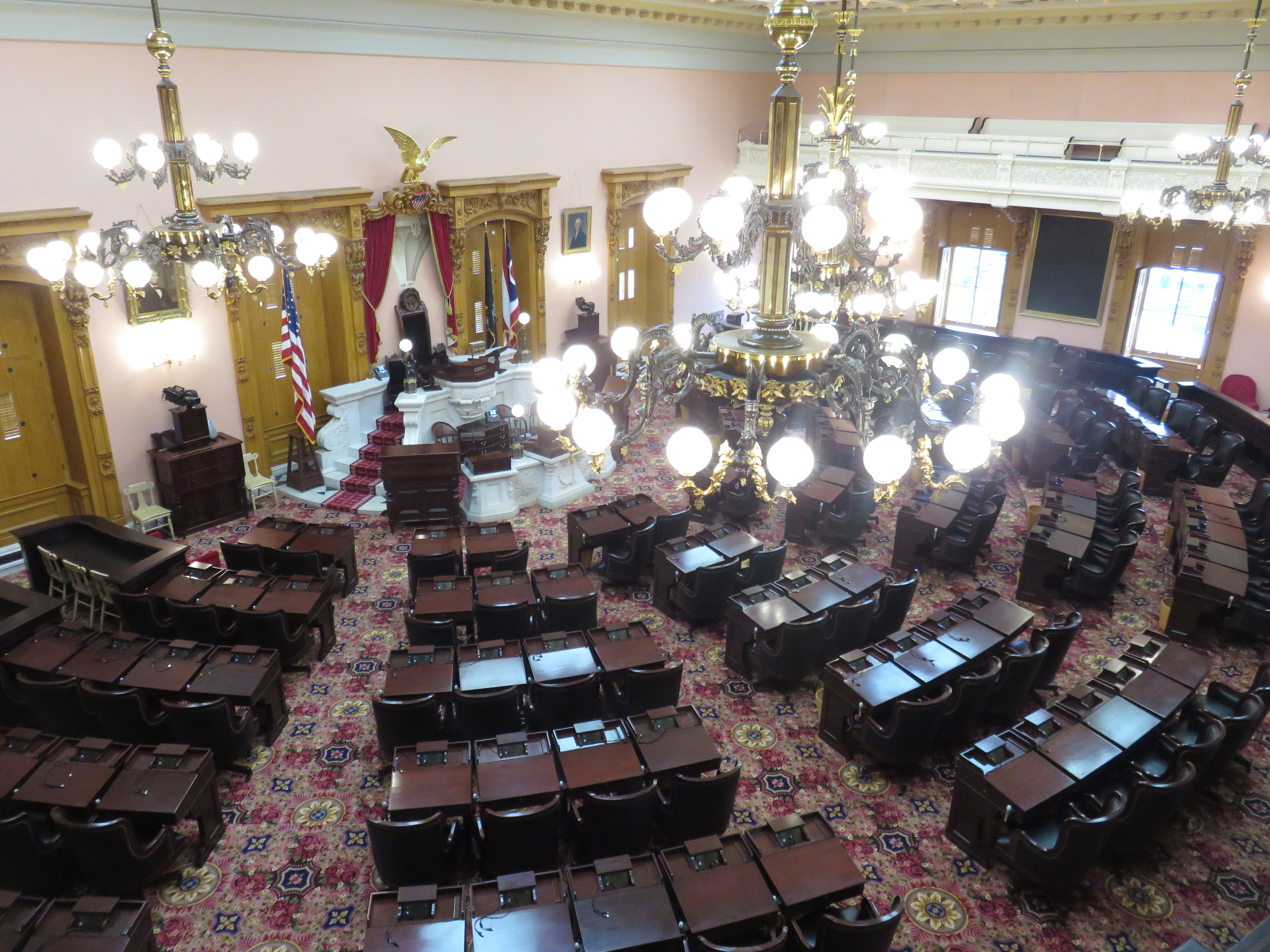
House of Representatives Chamber

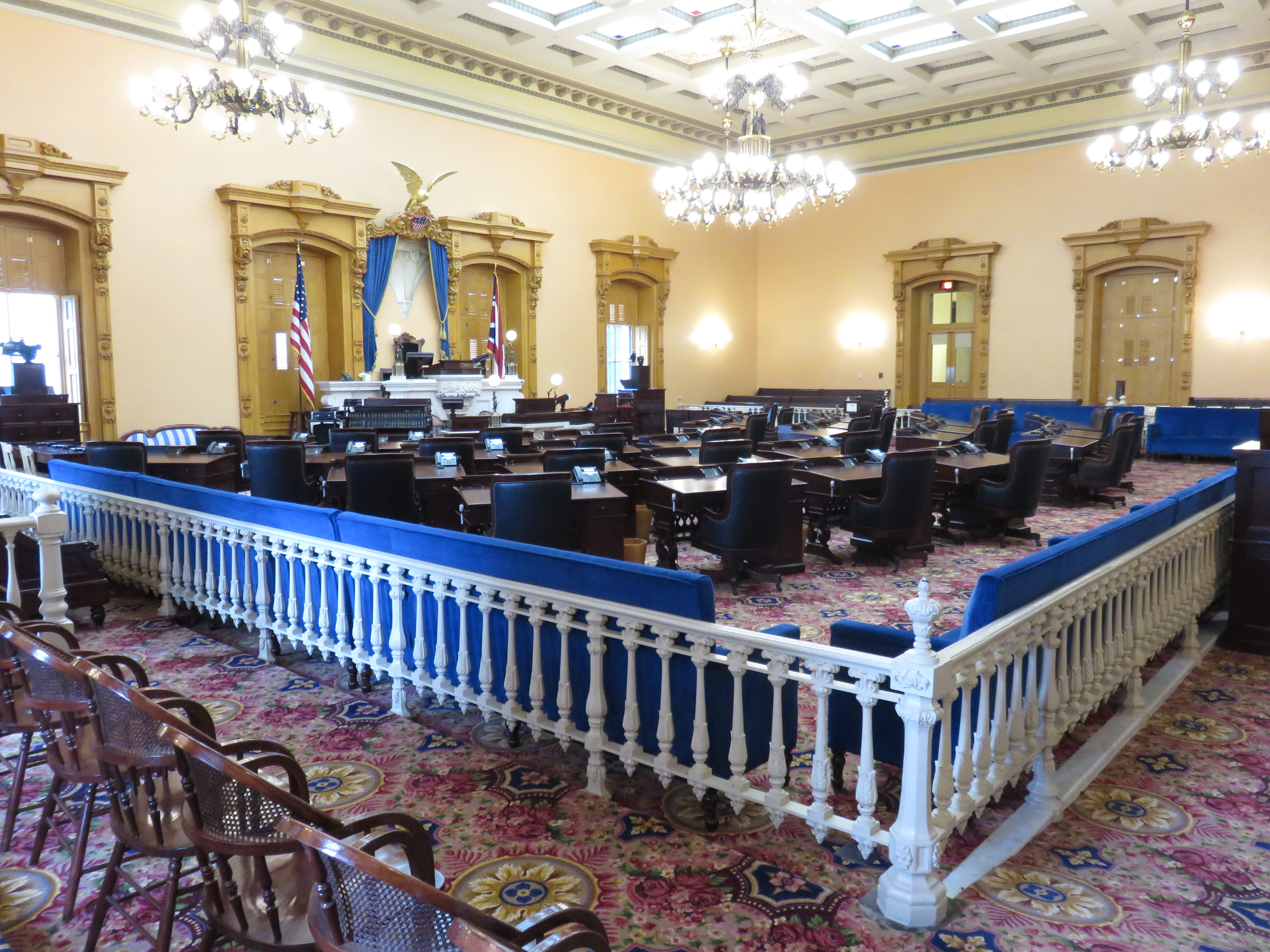
Senate Chamber

The Ohio Statehouse is located on Capitol Square, a 10-acre (4.0 ha) plot of land donated by four prominent landowners. The Statehouse stands upon foundations 18 feet (5.5 m) deep, built in part by prisoners sentenced to hard labor.

The Statehouse features a central recessed porch with a colonnade of a forthright and primitive Greek Doric mode, built of Columbus limestone that was quarried on the west banks of the Scioto River. A broad and low central pediment supports the windowed drum, referred to as a cupola, which contains an oculus that lights the interior rotunda.

Unlike many U.S. state capitol buildings, the Ohio Statehouse owes little to the architecture of the United States Capitol. It was designed and built before the U.S. Capitol was enlarged to its present form, with the large white dome that would be imitated on many US state capitol buildings.

The Ohio Statehouse has been termed a supreme example of Greek Revival style. It is not patterned on one single building, but is a combination of stylistic elements from Greek sources, melded with contemporary needs and functions. The cupola shows direct influence by the Tholos of Delphi, a circular temple built about 360 BC. The Parthenon of Athens is also an influence. None of the monumental ancient Greek buildings on which Greek Revival architecture is modeled would have contained windows, but they were a major part of Greek Revival for a more practical reason: before electric light, sunlight was the major source of illumination.

The ceremonial offices of the governor, lieutenant governor, treasurer, and auditor are located on the first floor of the building. The relocation of the governor's working office to the Vern Riffe Center for Government and the Arts, located across High Street from the Statehouse, was originally a temporary action taken while the historic building was undergoing an extensive restoration and upgrading. At the completion of the project the governor, George Voinovich preferred the larger, more modern space and did not return to the Statehouse office except for occasional ceremonial use. Voinovich's successor Bob Taft used the historic governor's office in a similar way, as did former governor John Kasich. Kasich's immediate predecessor, Ted Strickland, however, used the Statehouse office on a regular basis. Strickland considered the presence of the Governor in a building where the Legislature also works as both symbolic and practical examples of how the parts of government relate to each other. Like Strickland, current governor Mike DeWine uses the Statehouse office on a regular basis, although his staff remains based in the Riffe Center.

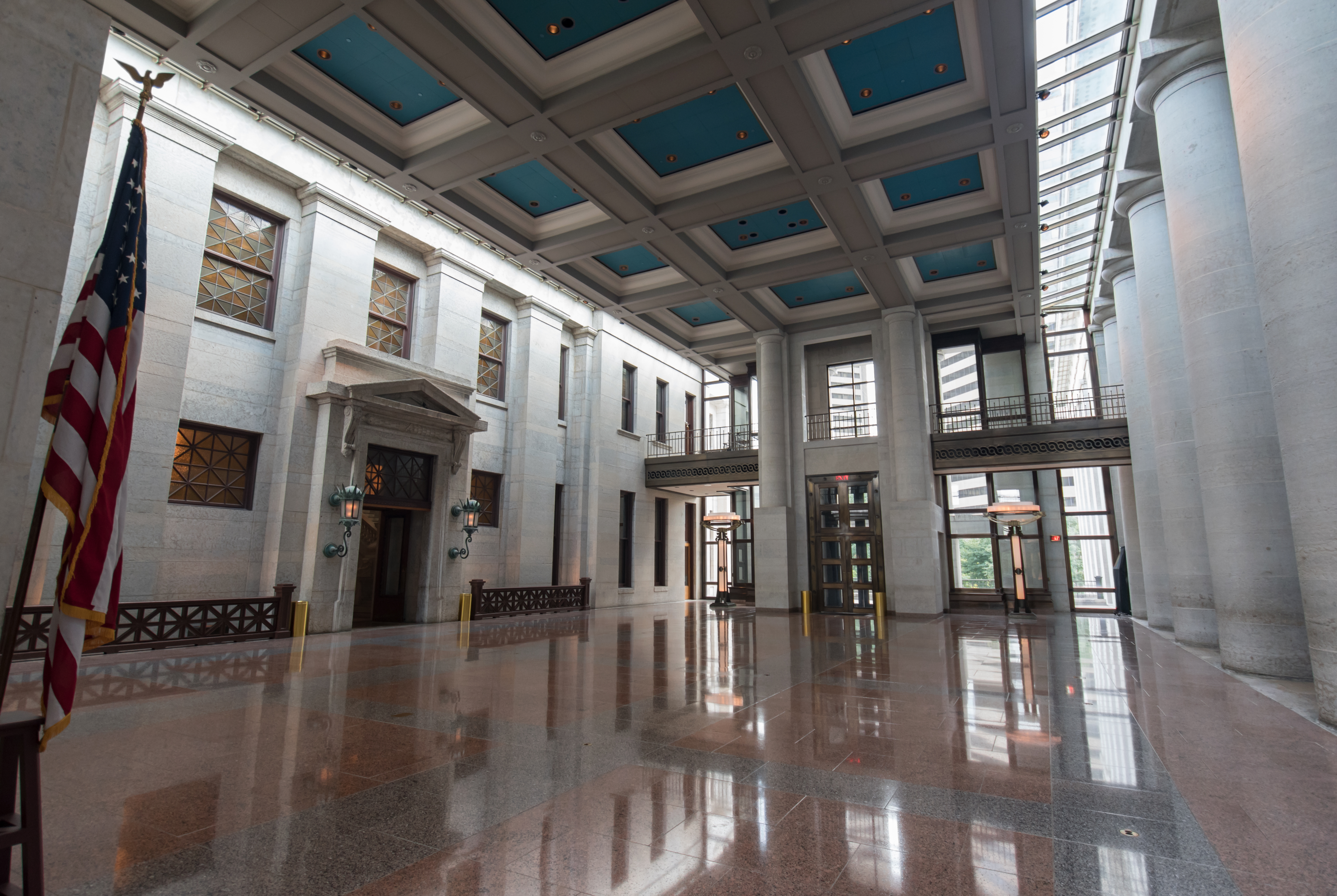
The Atrium

The Ohio General Assembly chambers are on the second floor. Although in general their appearance is similar to their original appearance, the rooms have been modernized in many ways. Modern information and communication capabilities have been added.

The Atrium, which connects the Statehouse with the Senate Building, is a large open space which hosts government functions and ceremonies as well as various meetings and events. It is constructed of the same limestone as the two adjoining buildings.

There are a great number of portraits of governors and lieutenant governors contained in hearing rooms and offices throughout the building, and in public spaces there are several large scale artworks that memorialize individuals or events significant to the state or the nation. Ohio artist Howard Chandler Christy is represented with two paintings that depict the signing of the Treaty of Greenville, a seminal event in state history, and a painting that honors another Ohio native, Thomas Edison. President Abraham Lincoln visited the building on three different occasions, and a large marble bust erected after his death memorializes him and also depicts the Union victory at Vicksburg. The floor of the Statehouse rotunda is composed of almost 5,000 individual pieces of marble, all cut and fitted by hand. The design at the center of the floor traces the development of the United States: the 13 stones in the center represent the original colonies; the three rings symbolize areas of territory that enlarged the nation; surrounding the rings is a star burst with 32 points, one for each of the states in the Union when the floor was laid down; and surrounding the entire design is a gray band representing the U.S. Constitution.

=== Ohioans in Space ===
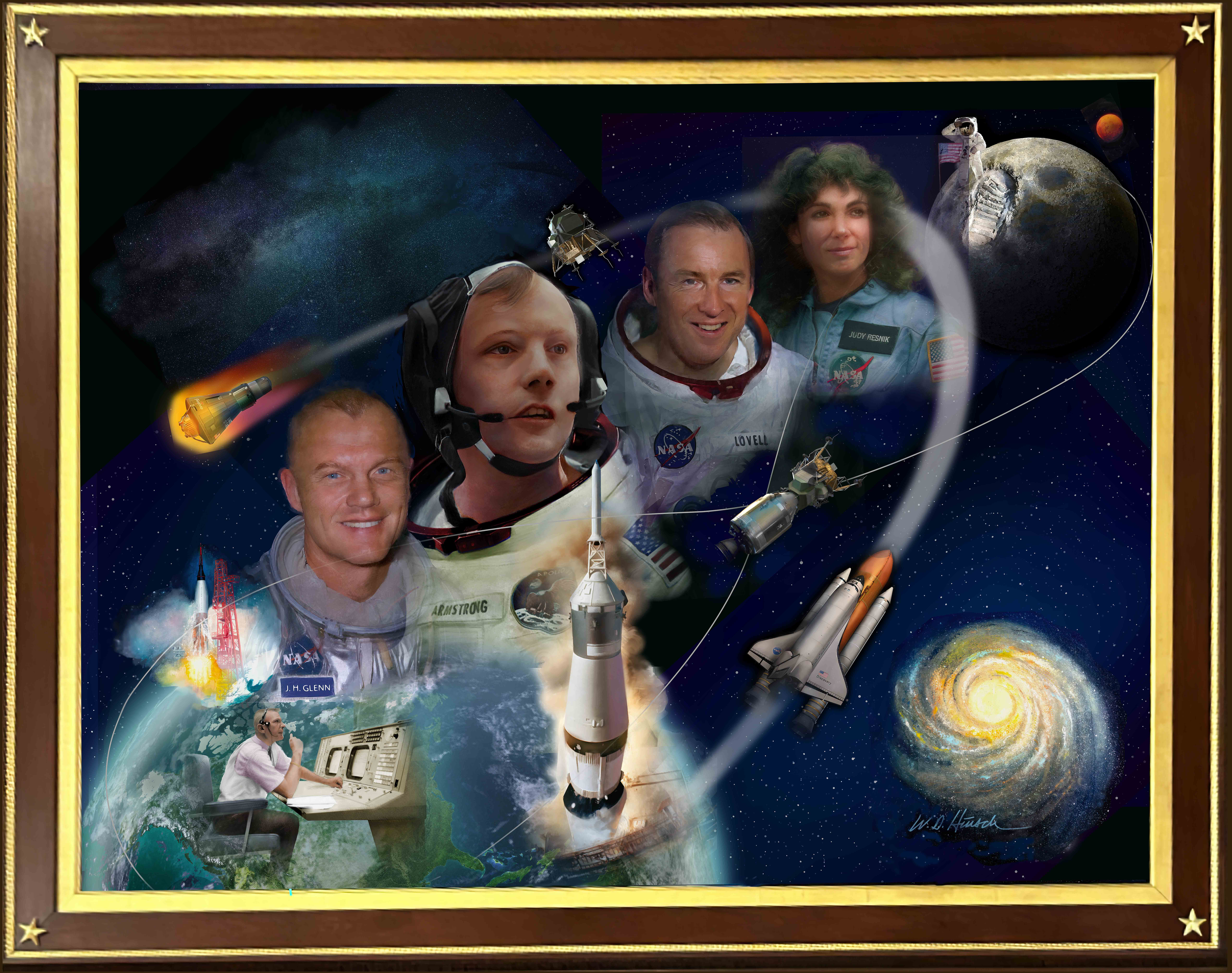
Ohioans in Space, 2024 by William D. Hinsch, created for the Ohio Statehouse

Ohioans in Space is a 2024 oil painting by William D. Hinsch that pays homage to Ohio-born astronauts, including John Glenn, Neil Armstrong, Jim Lovell, Judith Resnik. NASA chief flight director Gene Kranz is also portrayed. It was commissioned by the Capitol Square Review and Advisory Board to honor achievements of Ohioans in space exploration. It is installed in the statehouse rotunda. It is the first painting installed in the statehouse rotunda in almost 70 years, since the painting of the Wright brothers was hung. It portrays four of Ohio's 26 astronauts, selected for their groundbreaking accomplishments: John Glenn, the first American to orbit Earth; Neil Armstrong who, on Apollo 11, became the first person to set foot on the Moon; James Jim Lovell, the first astronaut to undertake four spaceflights, including Apollo 8 (the first humans to reach and orbit the Moon) and Apollo 13; and Judith Judy Resnik, one of the pioneering women selected by NASA for spaceflight missions. The painting also features Gene Kranz, a NASA flight director from Toledo, Ohio. Kranz represents all of the people from Ohio involved in making space flight possible.

=== Cupola ===
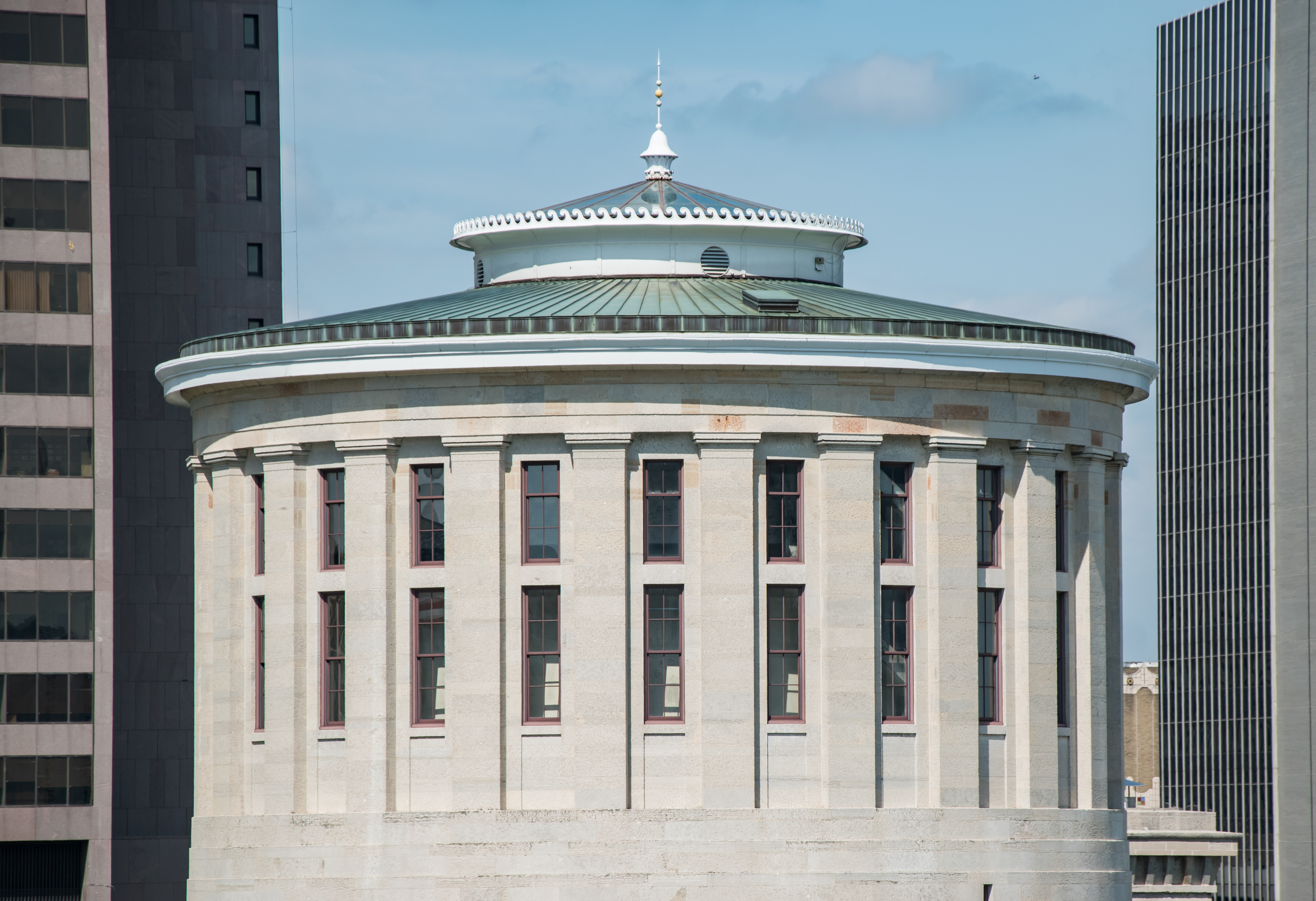
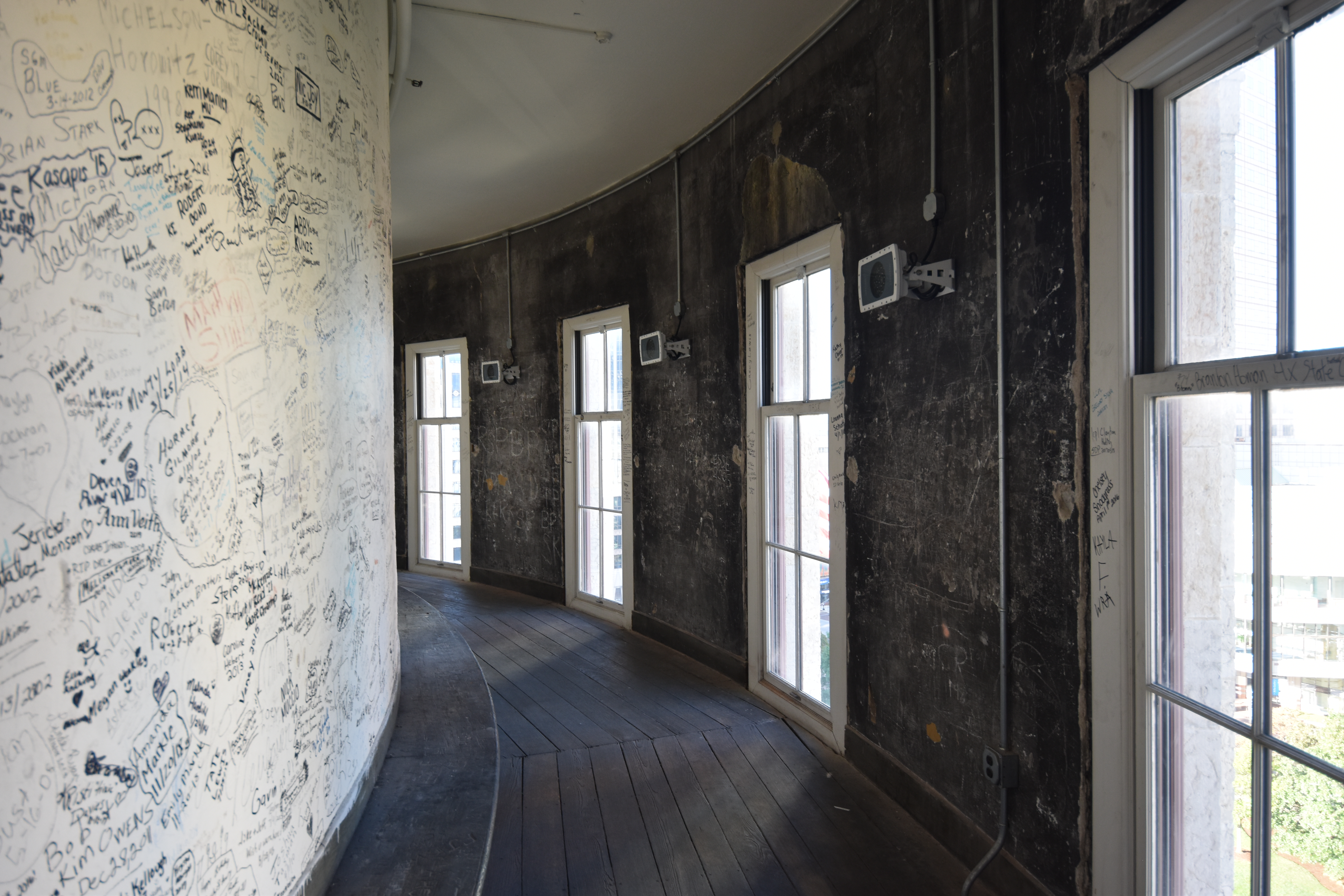
Exterior and interior of the Ohio Statehouse's cupola

The statehouse is topped with a two-story cupola, measuring 70 ft. tall and 64 ft. wide, which acts as an observation deck for viewing the surrounding city. The space is the last original, unrenovated area of the statehouse. In the present day, tours are only available by special request. Visitors traditionally sign their names on the cupola's walls; the oldest reads "J. Cook 1870".

== Grounds ==
Interactive map of notable buildings and sculptures on the Capitol Grounds of the Ohio Statehouse. Click on points for more details.

The Ohio Statehouse grounds, known as Capitol Square, are a large square park space surrounding the statehouse, bordered by Broad, High, State, and 3rd streets. The grounds have been remodeled several times, and a parking garage was constructed under the front lawn in the 1960s. Presently the northwest and southwest corners of the grounds have penthouses to access the garage, while the northeast and southeast corners have automobile drives down into the garage. The east lawn, beside the Senate Building, was used for parking during the 20th century.

The western portion of the statehouse grounds features a 3.5-ft-tall decorative metal fence. The fence was installed in 2012 as an additional security measure, though replicating the design of a prior fence in place from 1873 to 1964 (removed during construction of the underground parking garage). The eastern portion, the Veterans Plaza, remains open, and the fenced-off portion on the west side is never closed off except for special events.

The Statehouse contains many large scale artworks on the grounds of the building. A large statuary group by Hermon MacNeil, the William McKinley Monument, honors and remembers Ohio governor and U.S. president William McKinley. The Great Seal of Ohio and the state motto, "With God, all things are possible", are engraved at the foot of the steps leading to the west entrance.

Selected works

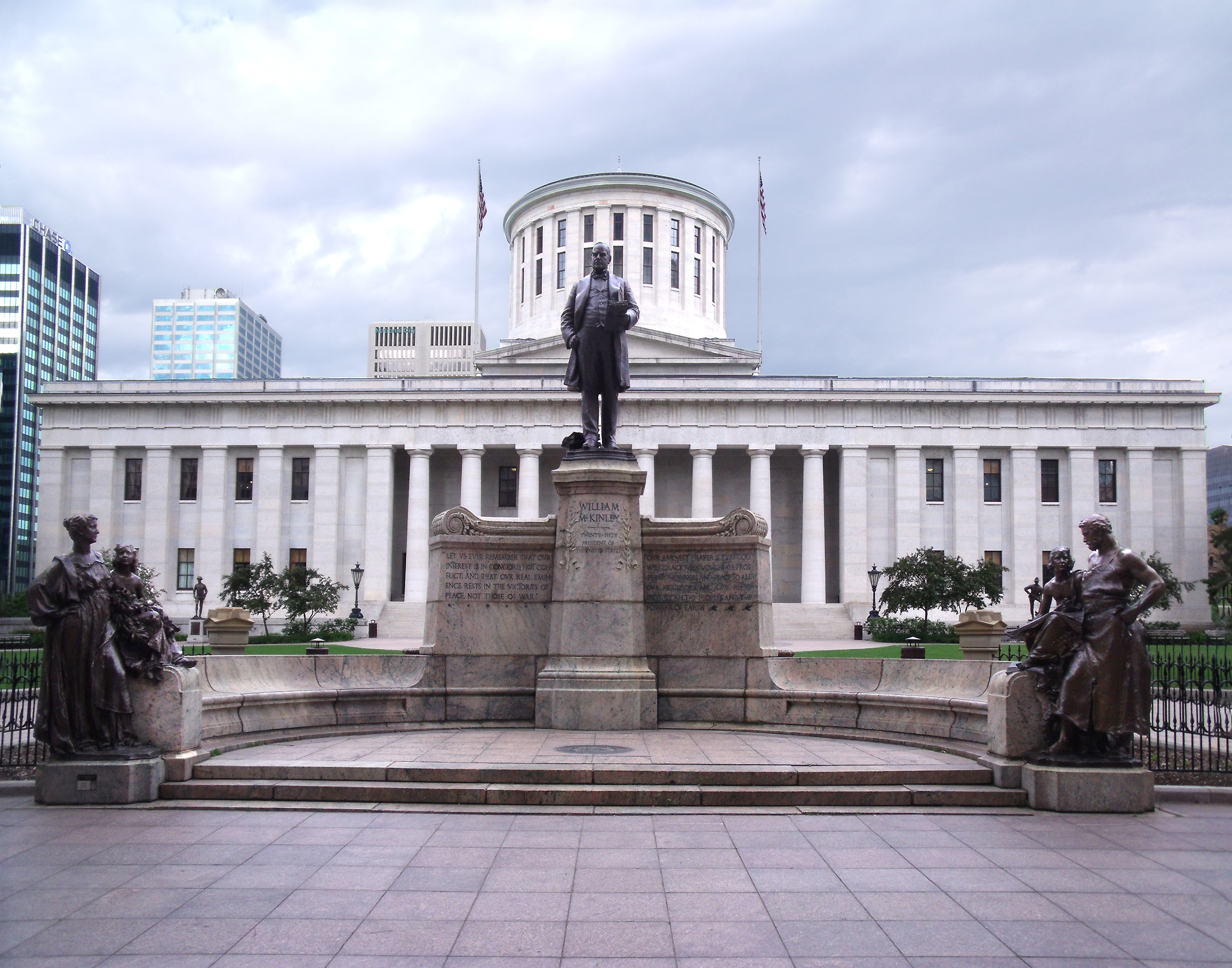
The William McKinley Monument (1906)

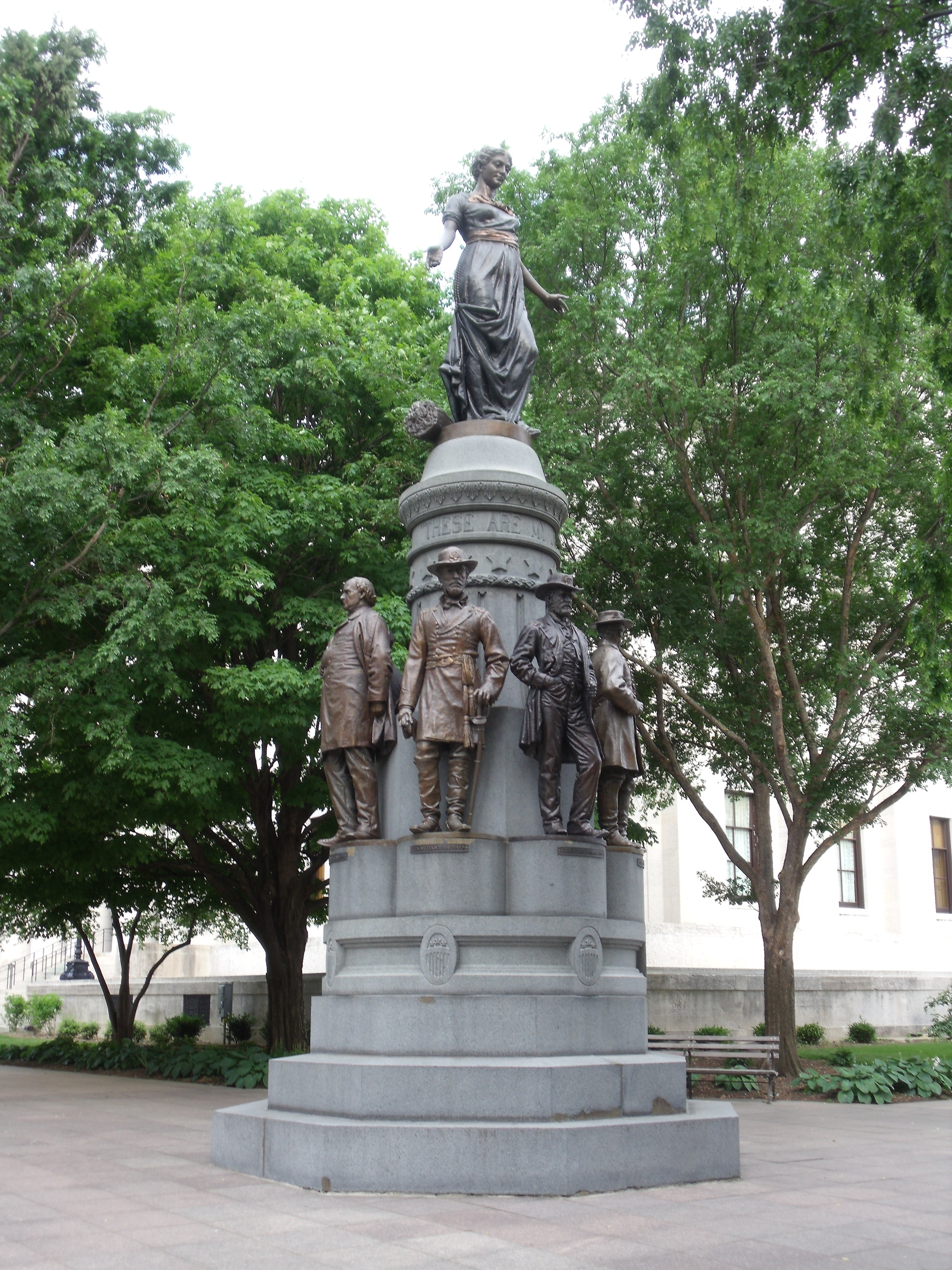
These Are My Jewels (1894)

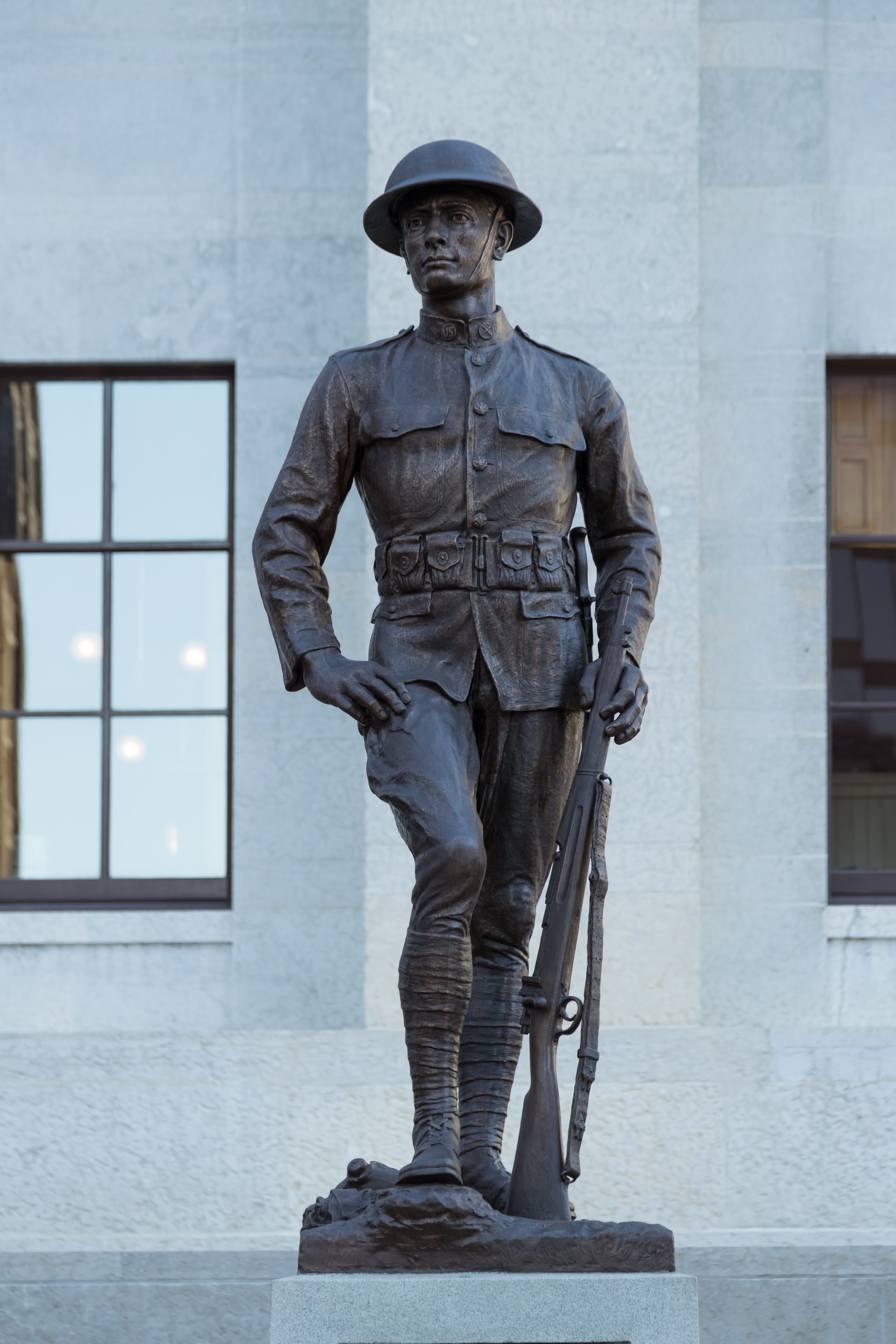
The Doughboy (1930)

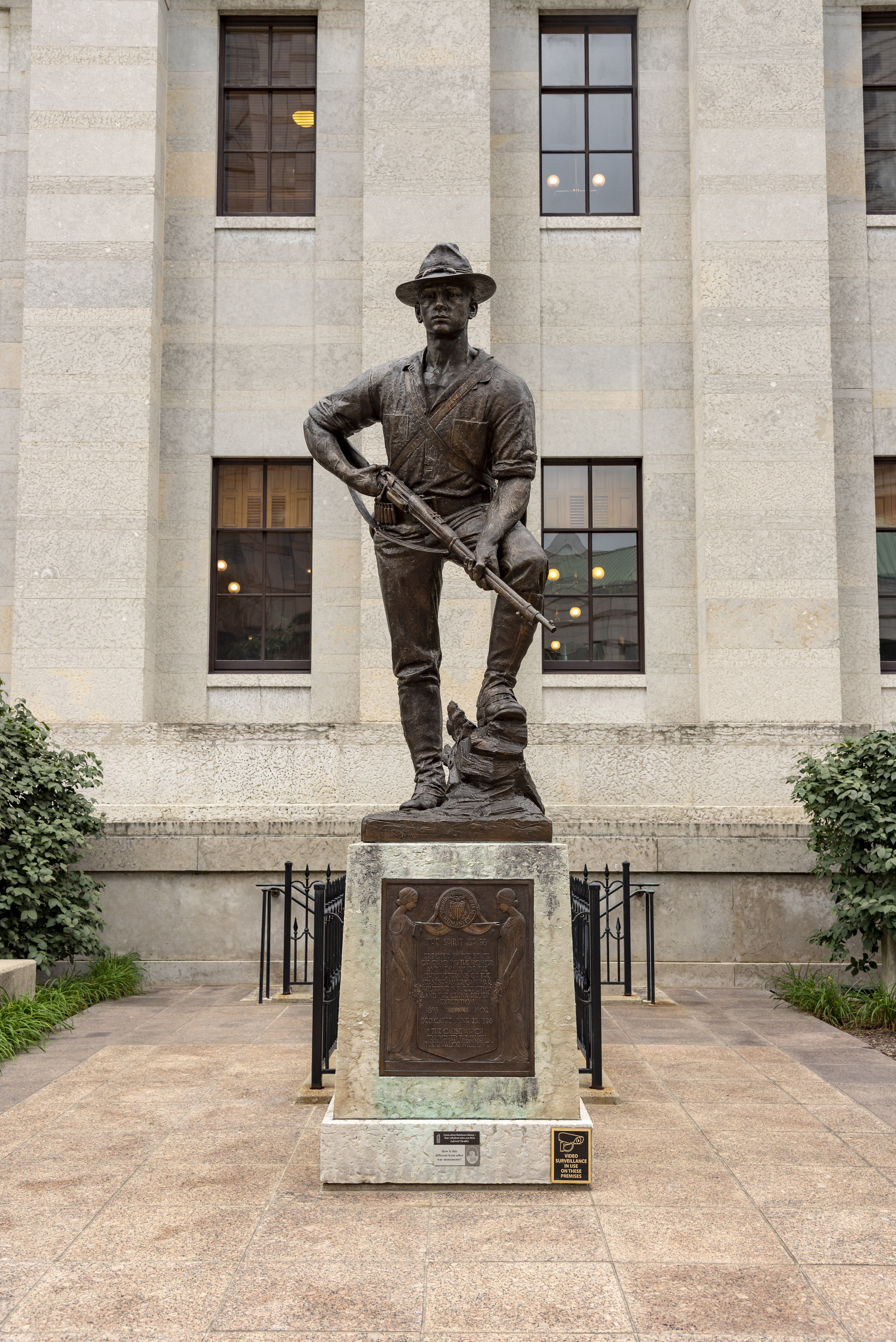
The Spirit of '98 (1928)

== Museum ==
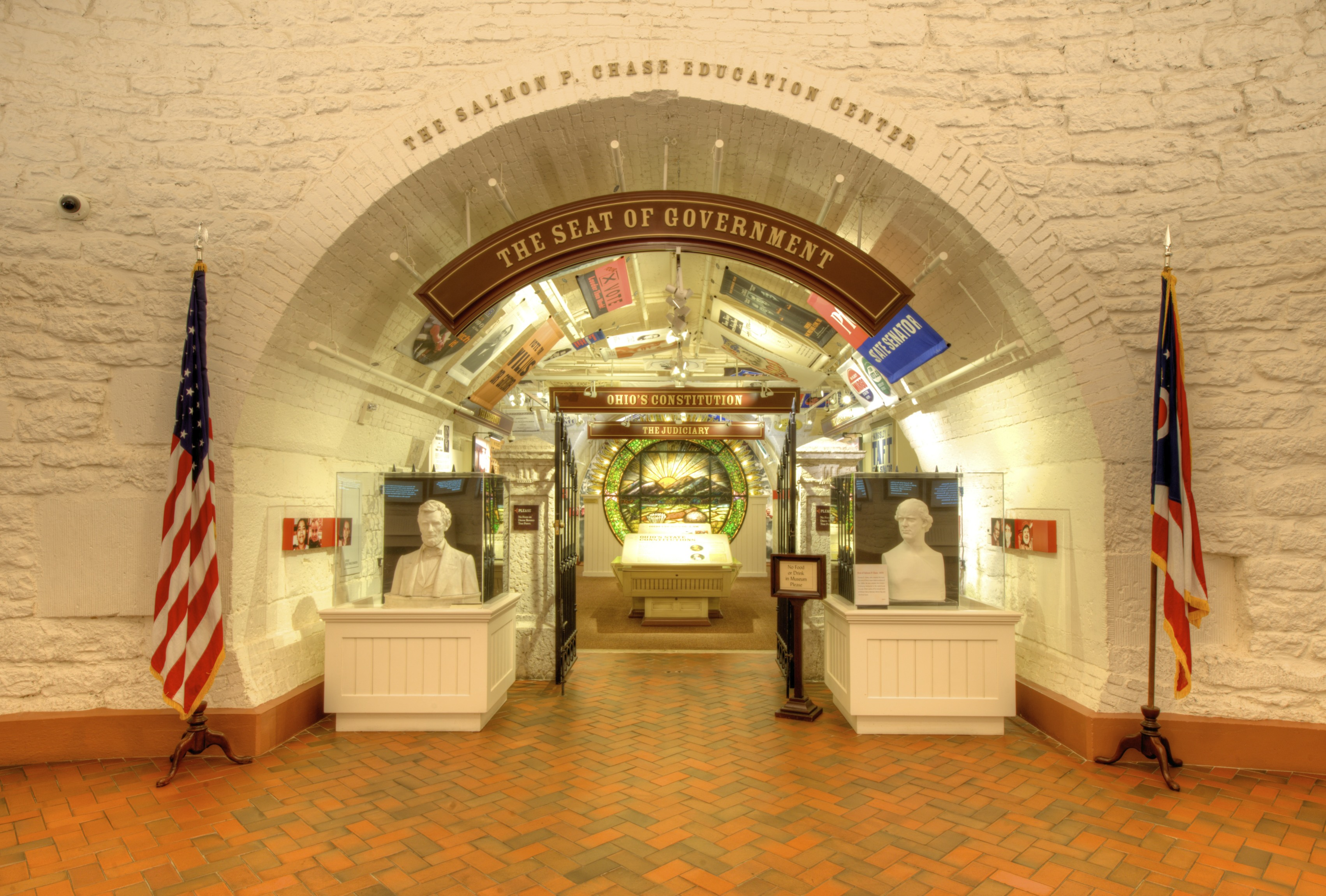
Entrance to the Ohio Statehouse Museum Education Center

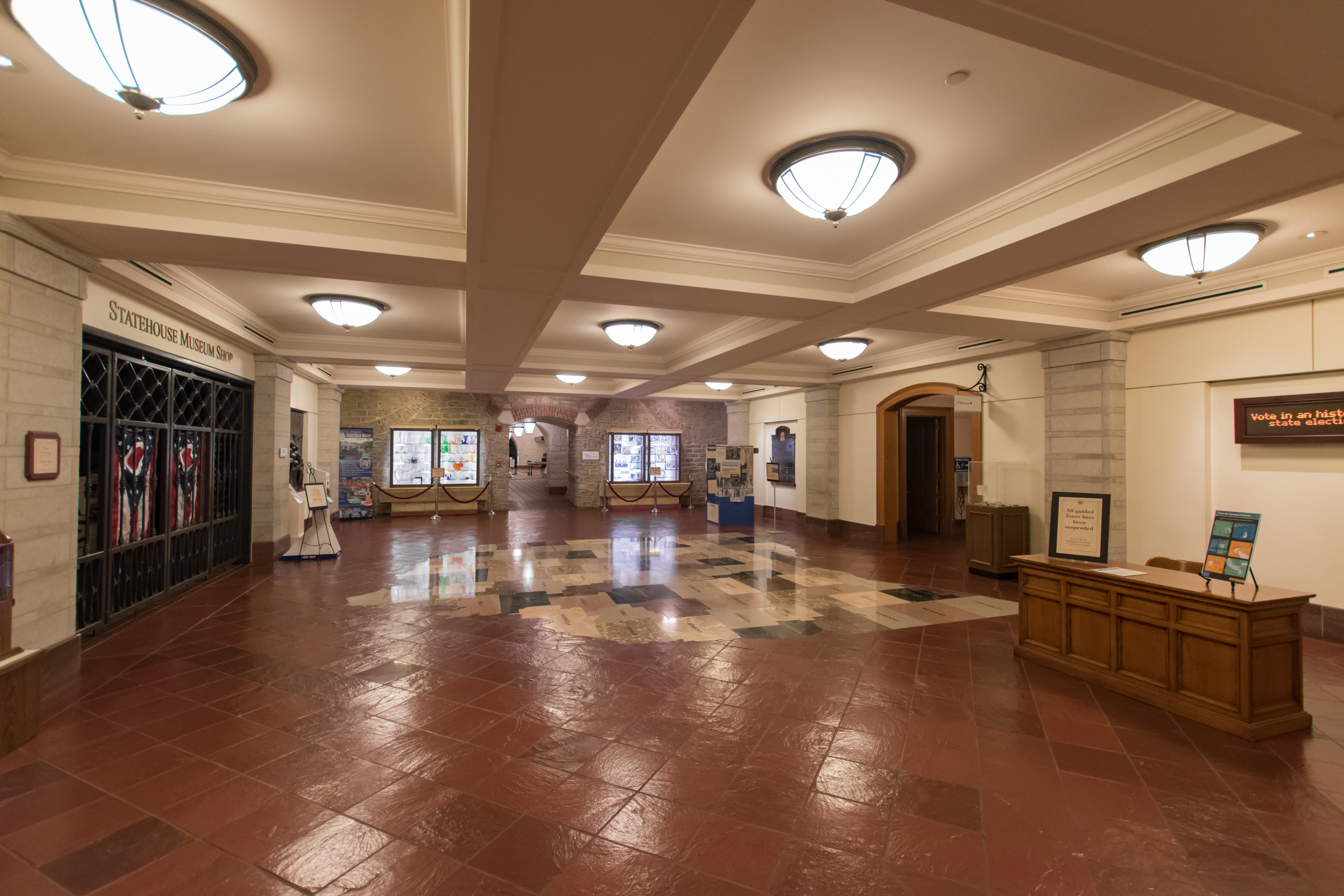
The Map Room

The Ohio Statehouse functions both as a working government building that contains the activities of a legislature and governor's office, and as a museum. During calendar years 2007 and 2008 approximately 70,000 visitors participated with organized tours of the building each of the years. The tours, exhibits and other public education activities are organized by the Ohio Statehouse Museum Education Center, a non-partisan entity funded and staffed by the Capitol Square Review and Advisory Board, the government agency that is the manager of the physical structure.

Tours are available every day the building is open, and are provided at no cost. Tours for casual visitors, tourists or small groups are given on the hour seven days a week, and groups larger than ten persons can schedule throughout the day between the hours of 9:30 am and 3:15 pm weekdays.

The staff of the Ohio Statehouse Museum Education Center is assisted by more than 90 volunteers. Tour content could be tailored to the age range and interest level of each group. The largest demographic group of visitors are fourth graders who were learning both state history and government process in their classrooms, but tours targeting political process, Ohio presidential history and Art and Architecture are also available.

One of the most notable tour programs available at the Ohio Statehouse was named "The Portals of History", which used the building as a stage to introduce characters from the state's history. As a tour group made their way through the building, they encountered living history presenters portraying notable individuals from the past. It also holds a memorial sign on one of its pillars showing the exact location that Abraham Lincoln, prior to his run for president, stood to give a speech on the building's steps.

== See also ==
- List of Ohio state legislatures
- Capitol Square Review & Advisory Board v. Pinette
- List of state and territorial capitols in the United States
