= The Doughboy (Ivone) =

Sculpture in Columbus, Ohio, U.S.

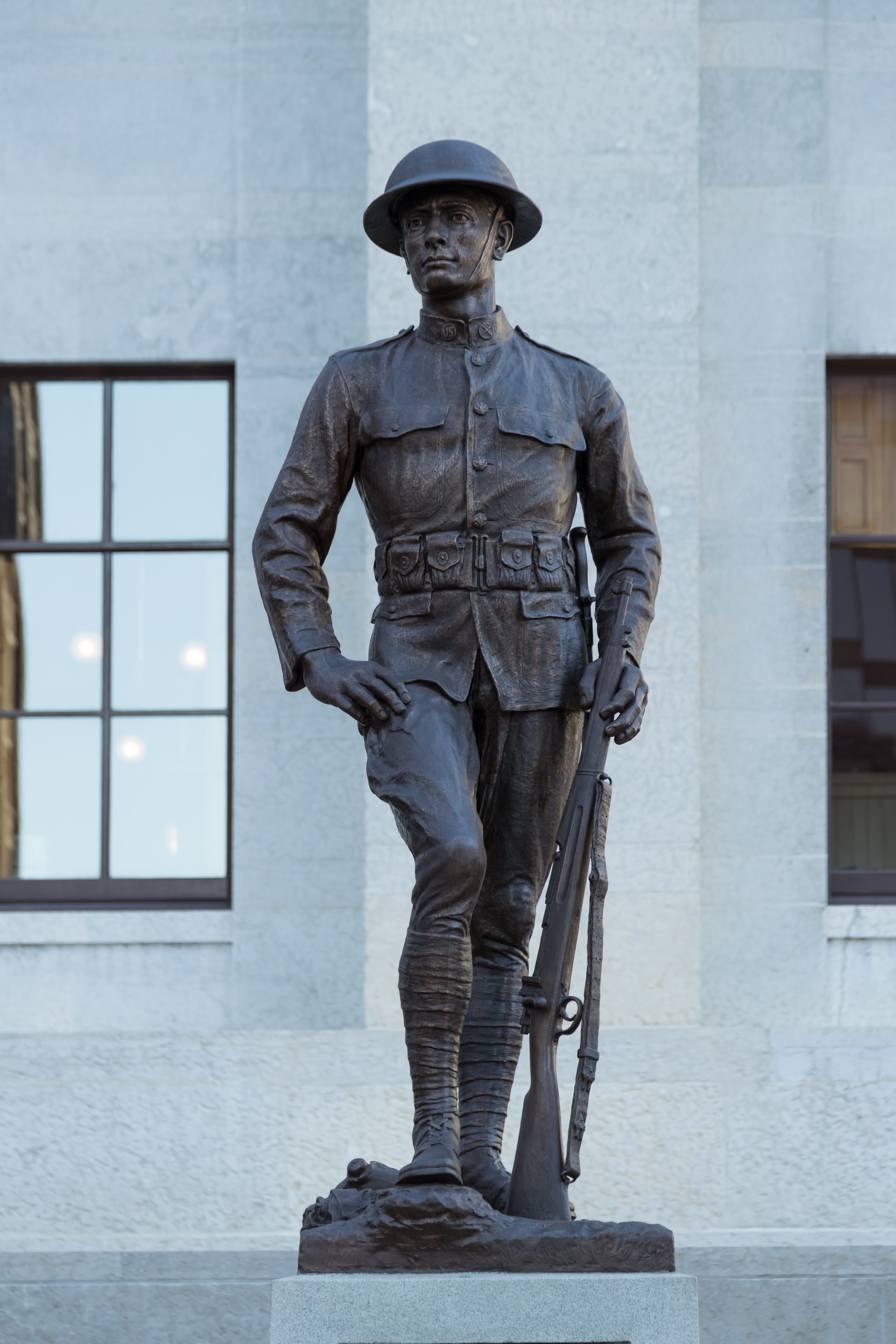
- The statue in 2018
- Artist: Arthur Ivone
- Year: 1930
- Location: Columbus, Ohio, United States
- 39°57′41.5″N 82°59′58.6″W

The Doughboy, also known as the Ohio World War Memorial, is a 1930 bronze sculpture by Arthur Ivone, installed outside the Ohio Statehouse in Columbus, Ohio, United States. The statue, approximately 10 feet (3.0 m) tall, depicts a male soldier. It is mounted on a stone base with bronze plaques on three sides. The artwork was installed on the building's grounds in 1930, and underwent a restoration by George Wright between 1989 and 1992. It was surveyed by the Smithsonian Institution's "Save Outdoor Sculpture!" program in 1994.

== Gallery ==
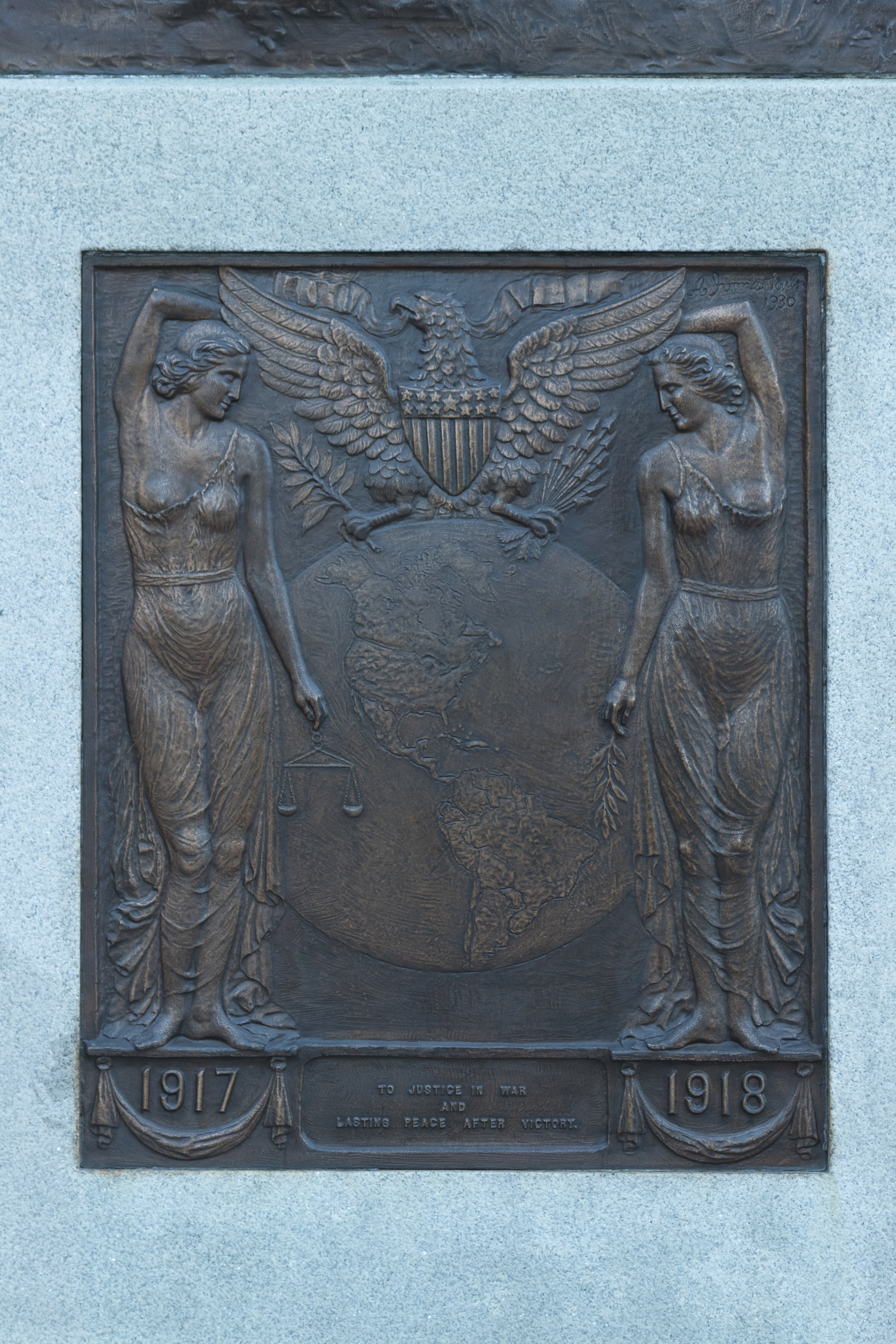
Statue plaque

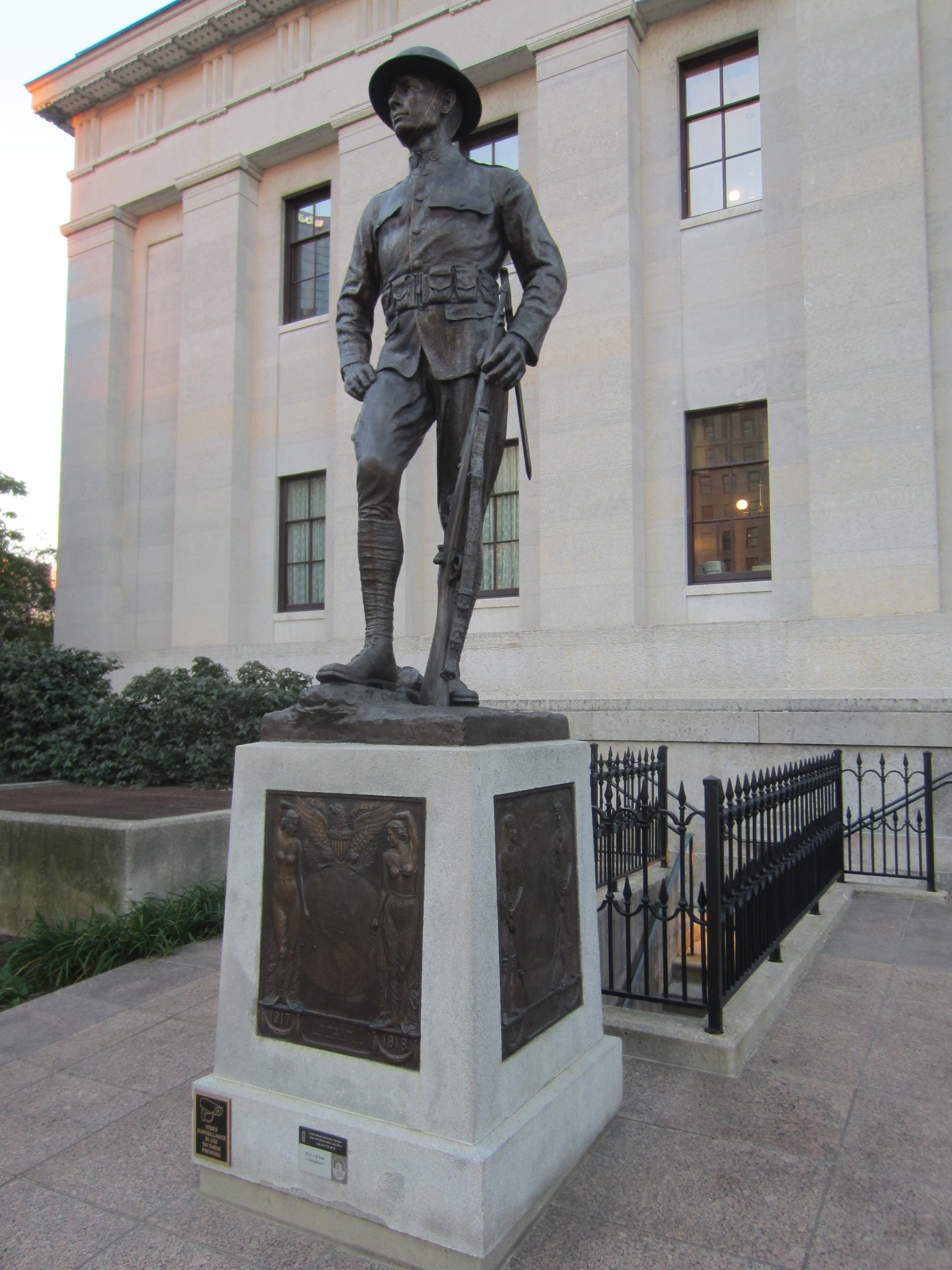
Full memorial

== See also ==
- 1930 in art
