= The Spirit of '98 =

Sculpture in Columbus, Ohio, U.S.

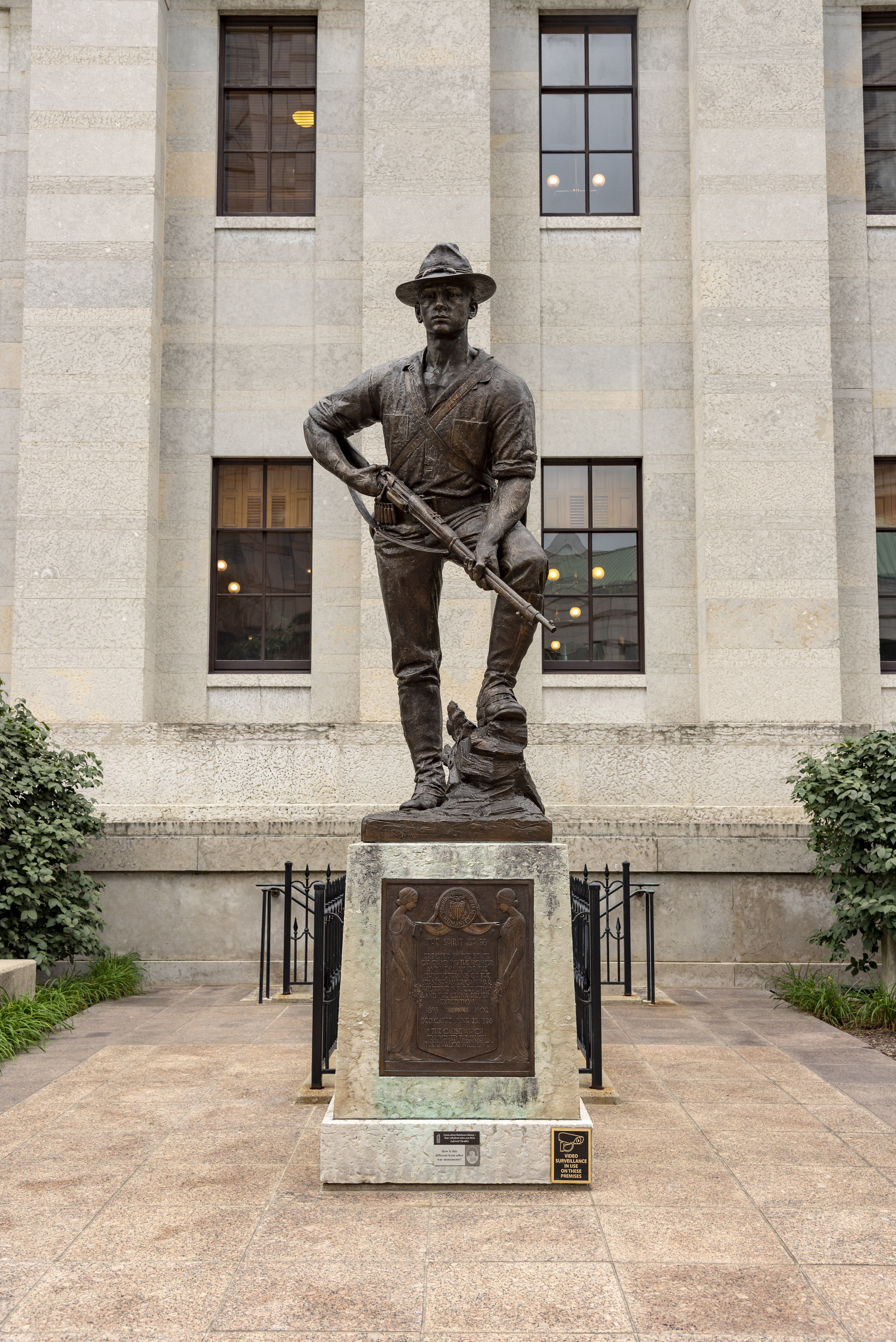
- The statue in 2018
- Year: 1928
- Medium: Bronze sculpture
- Location: Columbus, Ohio, United States
- 39°57′40″N 82°59′58″W

The Spirit of '98 is a 1928 bronze sculpture by an unknown artist, honoring veterans of the Spanish American War installed on the Ohio Statehouse grounds in Columbus, Ohio, United States.

== Description and history ==
The bronze statue is approximately 10 feet (3.0 m) tall. It rests on a square cream colored stone base with plaques on three sides. The sculpture and plaques are patinated and have metal highlights.

The statue was installed outside the Ohio Statehouse in 1930. George Wright restored the artwork between 1989 and 1992. It was surveyed by the Smithsonian Institution's "Save Outdoor Sculpture!" program in 1994.
