= Great Southern Hotel & Theatre =

Hotel and theater in Columbus, Ohio

- Great Southern Hotel and Theatre
- U.S. National Register of Historic Places
- U.S. Historic district – Contributing property
- Columbus Register of Historic Properties
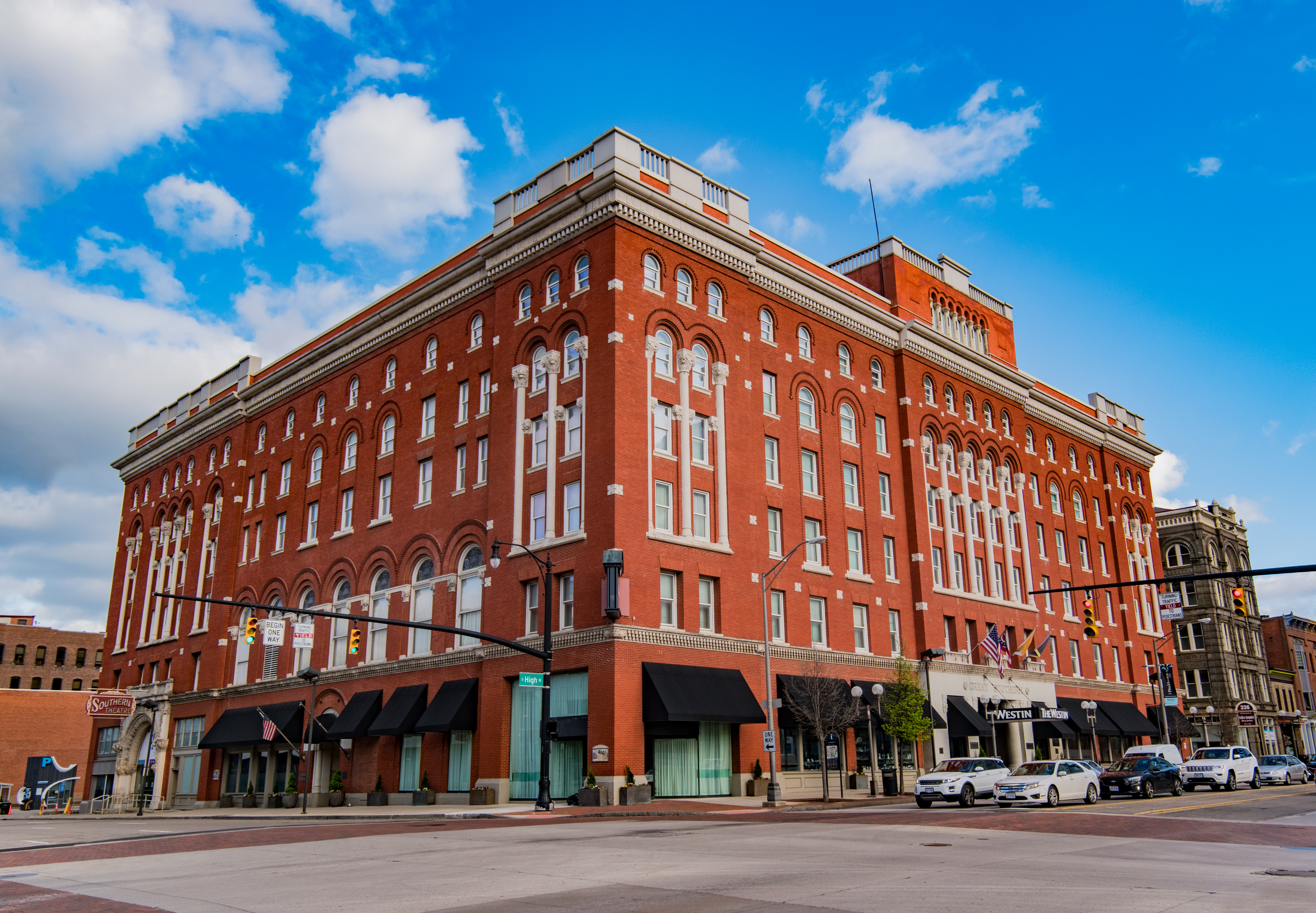
- Interactive map highlighting the building's location
- Location: 310 S. High St., Columbus, Ohio
- Coordinates: 39.956089°N 82.998729°W
- Area: less than one acre
- Built: 1894
- Architect: Dauben, Krumm, and Riebel
- Architectural style: Colonial Revival
- Part of: South High Commercial Historic District
- NRHP reference No.: 82001458
- CRHP No.: CR-10

Significant dates
- Added to NRHP: December 2, 1982
- Designated CRHP: July 12, 1982

The Great Southern Hotel & Theatre is a historic hotel and theater building in Downtown Columbus, Ohio, that operates as the Westin Great Southern Columbus and the Southern Theatre.

It opened on September 21, 1896 and is the oldest surviving theater in Central Ohio and one of the oldest in the state of Ohio. The Southern Theatre is currently owned and operated as a home for live concerts, plays and opera by the Columbus Association for the Performing Arts (CAPA). CAPA also manages several other venues in Columbus including the Ohio, the Palace, and the Lincoln Theatres.

The building was listed on the National Register of Historic Places and Columbus Register of Historic Properties in 1982. It was also included in the South High Commercial Historic District, added to those registers in 1983 and 1987, respectively.

== History ==
=== Design ===
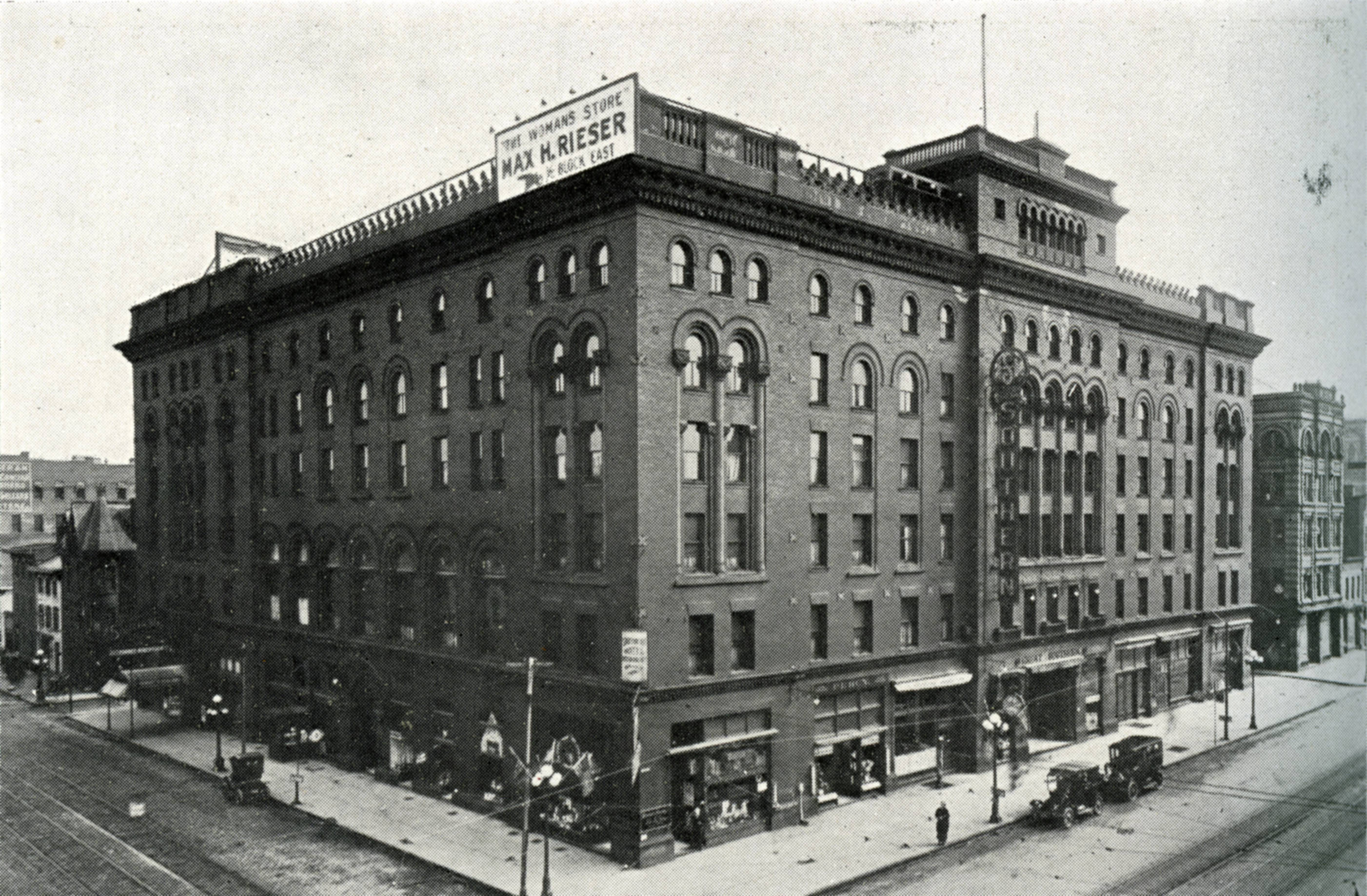
The hotel c. 1915

Between 1889 and 1893 a series of fires destroyed five downtown Columbus theaters. As a result, a group of businessmen decided to develop a new hotel and theater with modern construction and safety features on the southern edge of downtown. The building was called "The Great Southern Fireproof Hotel and Opera House", and was designed by the local architectural firm of Dauben, Krumm, and Riebel. Construction began in 1894. Both the theater and the hotel were constructed of "fireproof" tile, brick, iron, steel, and concrete.

The theater's auditorium design was progressive for its day and was reminiscent of Louis H. Sullivan's 1891 Schiller Theatre in Chicago. From the proscenium opening, a series of concentric arches dotted with incandescent electric lights radiate into the house, resulting in superior lighting and excellent acoustics. Built to be self-sufficient, the theater, one of the first commercial buildings in Columbus to use electricity, generated its own power. Additionally, the building had three wells in the basement, from which it produced its own water supply. The theatre currently seats 933 and is an intimate "jewel box" type theater with two balconies.

In 1982, the Great Southern was added to the National Register of Historic Places.

=== Theater use ===
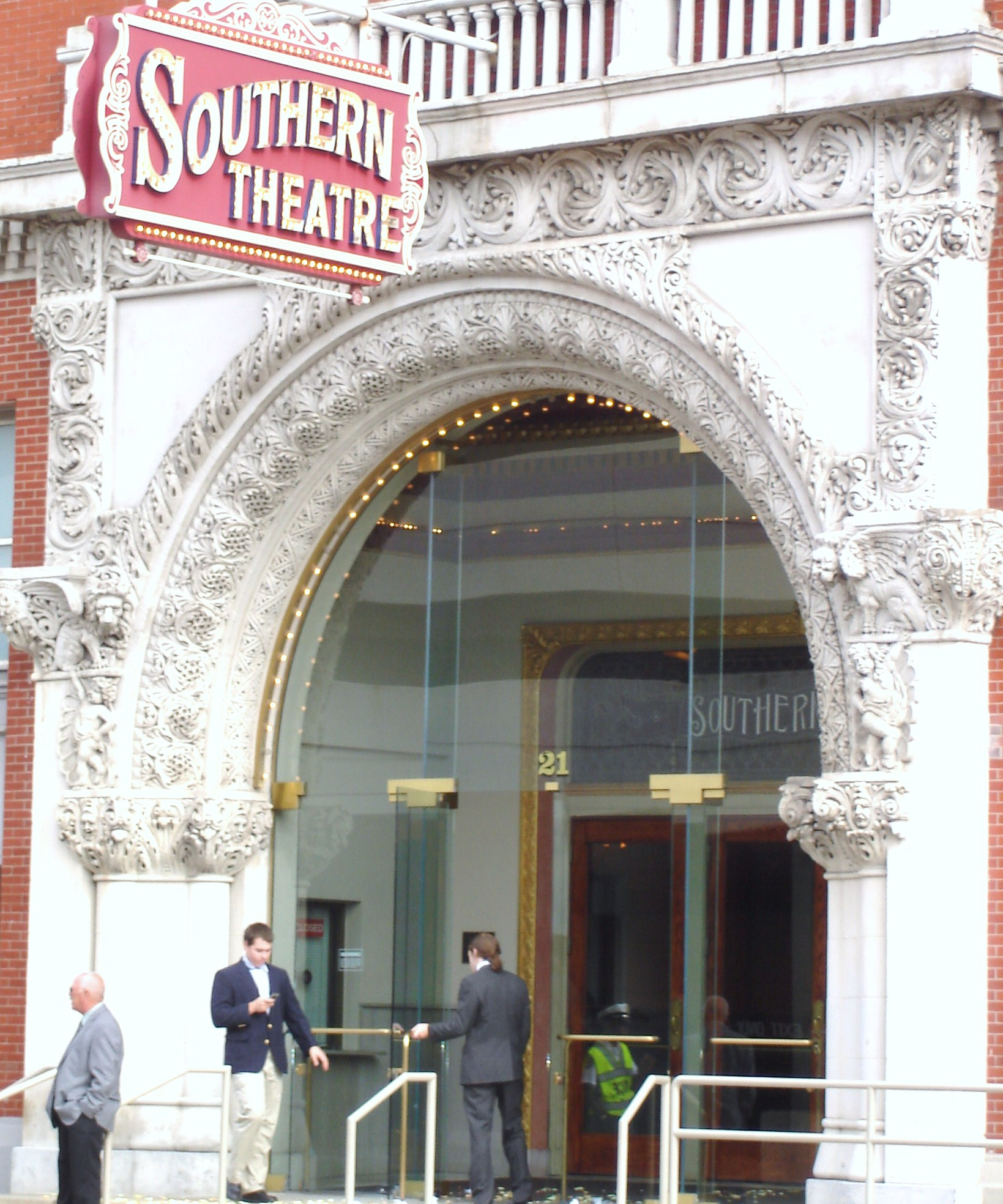
Theater entrance

The Great Southern Theatre originally hosted theatrical touring productions. Sarah Bernhardt played in the theater in its first two decades. In the 1910s and 1920s the theater, now called the Southern, featured first run silent films and live vaudeville. From the 1930s on, the Southern was a popular home for second-run double features. In the 1970s the theater briefly returned to first run fare as the Towne Cinema, showing black exploitation movies. Throughout the 1970s the Southern also hosted a weekly live Country Music Jamboree, sponsored by local radio station WMNI.

The theater closed in 1979 and in 1986 was acquired by CAPA. After sitting empty for nearly two decades, the Southern was completely restored by CAPA in 1997-98 during an extensive 14-month rebuilding process. The newly restored Southern Theatre reopened on September 26, 1998. The Southern Theatre is now featured on many of Columbus's architectural tours.

== See also ==
- List of concert halls
- National Register of Historic Places listings in Columbus, Ohio
