= Drexel Theater =

Theater and movie theater in Bexley, Ohio

- U.S. National Register of Historic Places
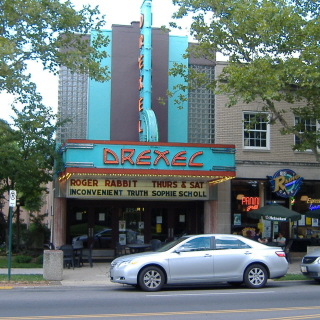
- Drexel Theater in 2006

- Location within Ohio Location within the United States
- Location: 2254 E Main St, Bexley, Ohio, U.S.
- Coordinates: 39.9573°N 82.9386°W
- Built: 1937
- Architect: Robert R. Royce
- Architectural style: Art Deco, Streamline Moderne
- Website: www.drexel.net
- NRHP reference No.: 15000322
- Added to NRHP: June 8, 2015

Drexel Theater, also known as Drexel Theatre, is a historic Art Deco and Art Moderne theater located in Bexley, Ohio. It was listed in the National Register of Historic Places on June 8, 2015.

A repertory cinema, the theater frequently shows both older and newer films. It became a non-profit cinema in 2011 following a leadership change. It is currently owned by the group Friends of the Drexel and managed by the Columbus Association for the Performing Arts.

== History ==
Drexel Theater was originally designed by Robert R. Royce, combining the styles of Art Deco and Art Moderne. It opened on December 25, 1937, and was owned by William Chesbrough, who owned multiple theaters in the area. It was damaged by a lightning strike in 1949, destroying the chimney.

It was leased to Jerome C. Knight in 1959. In 1981, it was purchased by Jeff and Kathy Frank, who renovated the theater to contain three smaller screens instead of one large one. Drexel Theater was purchased by the nonprofit group Friends of the Drexel in 2011. Renovations on the theater finished in July 2016. An Ohio Historical Marker was placed on the property on November 7, 2017.

== See also ==
- Ohio Theatre (Columbus, Ohio)
- Columbus Association for the Performing Arts
