= LeVeque Tower =

Skyscraper in Columbus, Ohio

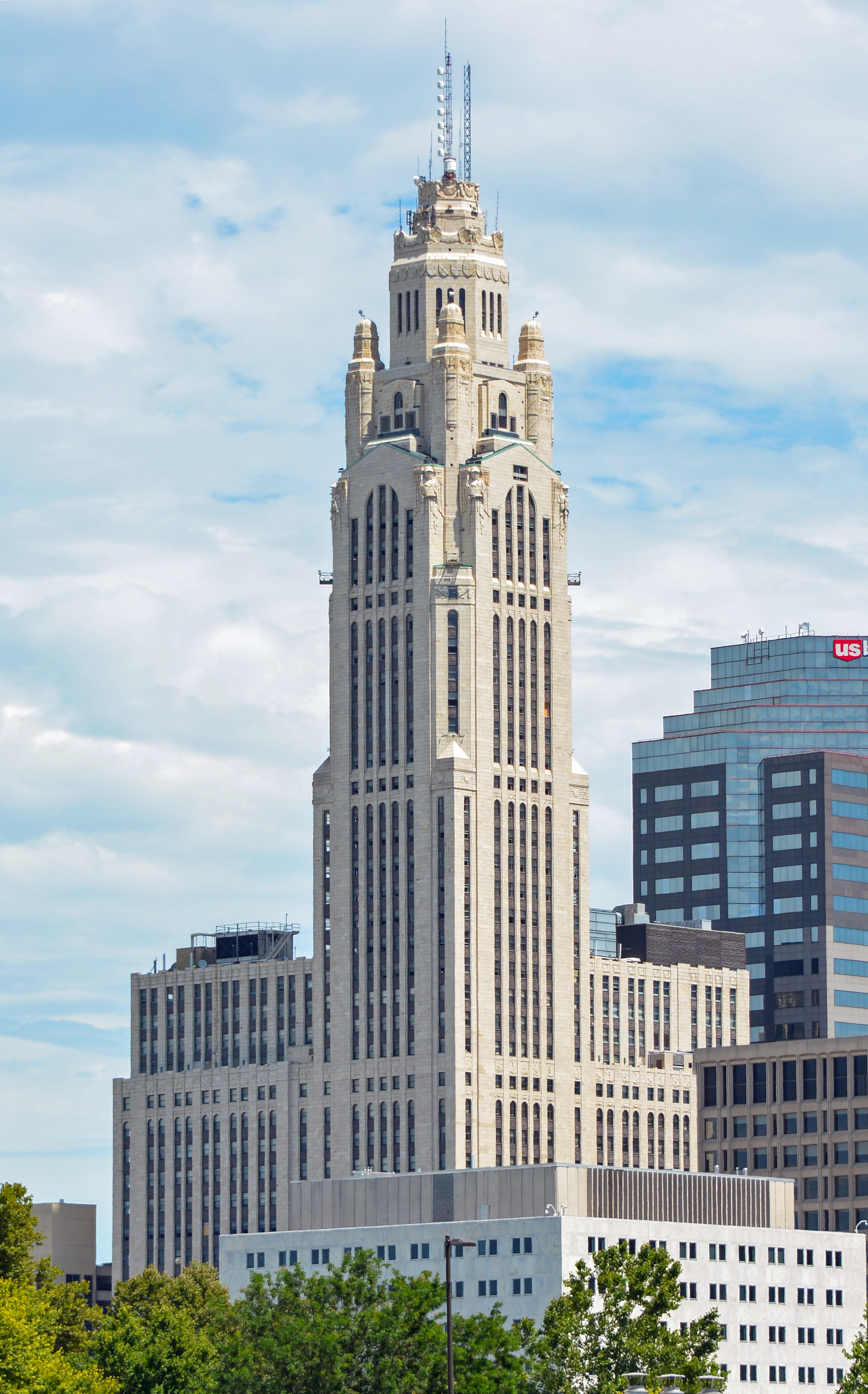
- Former names: American Insurance Union Citadel

Record height
- Tallest in Columbus from 1927 to 1974^{[I]}
- Preceded by: Capitol Trust Building
- Surpassed by: Rhodes State Office Tower

General information
- Type: Mixed-use
- Architectural style: Art Deco or Art Moderne
- Location: 50 W. Broad St., Columbus, Ohio
- Groundbreaking: September 23, 1924; 102 years ago
- Completed: September 21, 1927; 99 years ago
- Cost: $7.8 million

Height
- Height: 555 ft 5 in (169.29 m)

Dimensions
- Other dimensions: 188 ft (57 m) east-west and north-south

Technical details
- Floor count: 47
- Floor area: 353,768 sq ft (32,866.1 m^{2})

Design and construction
- Architect: C. Howard Crane

Website
- columbuslofts.com/leveque-tower-residences www.hotellevequecolumbus.com
- American Insurance Union Citadel
- U.S. National Register of Historic Places
- Columbus Register of Historic Properties
- Interactive map of American Insurance Union Citadel
- Coordinates: 39°57′45″N 83°00′08″W
- Area: 353,768 square feet (32,866.1 m^{2})
- NRHP reference No.: 75001398
- CRHP No.: CR-9

Significant dates
- Added to NRHP: March 21, 1975
- Designated CRHP: July 12, 1982

The LeVeque Tower is a 47-story skyscraper in Downtown Columbus, Ohio. At 555 feet 5 inches (169.29 m) it was the tallest building in the city from its completion in 1927 to 1974, and remains the second-tallest today.

Designed by C. Howard Crane, the 353,768-square-foot (32,866.1 m^{2}) Art Deco skyscraper was opened as the American Insurance Union Citadel in 1927 and at the time was the fifth tallest building in the world. Built at a cost of $8.7 million, the tower's design incorporates ornate ornamentation and a terracotta facade, and it was designed with 600 hotel rooms in two wings as well as an attached performance venue, the Palace Theatre. After the American Insurance Union went bankrupt in the Great Depression, the tower was renamed the Lincoln-LeVeque Tower in 1946, and later the LeVeque Tower in 1977.

The tower's office space saw mixed success in attracting tenants during its early history, but it became home to a number of state agencies and law firms. As development of Downtown Columbus peaked beginning in the 1960s and several other high rise buildings were constructed, the tower faced increasing competition from other major office buildings and its vacancy rates rose. Over the course of its history, the tower changed hands several times before being sold to a group of real estate investors in 2011. The current owners subsequently converted it into a mixed-use development, including a hotel, apartments, condominiums, offices and a restaurant, which opened in 2017.

== Design and construction ==
What would become the LeVeque Tower was commissioned by the American Insurance Union, a group formed in 1894 as a "fraternal insurance company, secret society and social club" by John J. Lentz, who would later become a U.S. Representative, and who served as president of the organization. Originally named the American Insurance Union Citadel, the tower was to be the headquarters for the organization and would replace a smaller building it owned on the corner of Broad Street and Front Street in Downtown Columbus, a short distance from the Scioto River. The tower was designed by Detroit, Michigan-based architect C. Howard Crane, known for grandiose designs. Its construction took place during the first wave of modern skyscraper development in the United States.

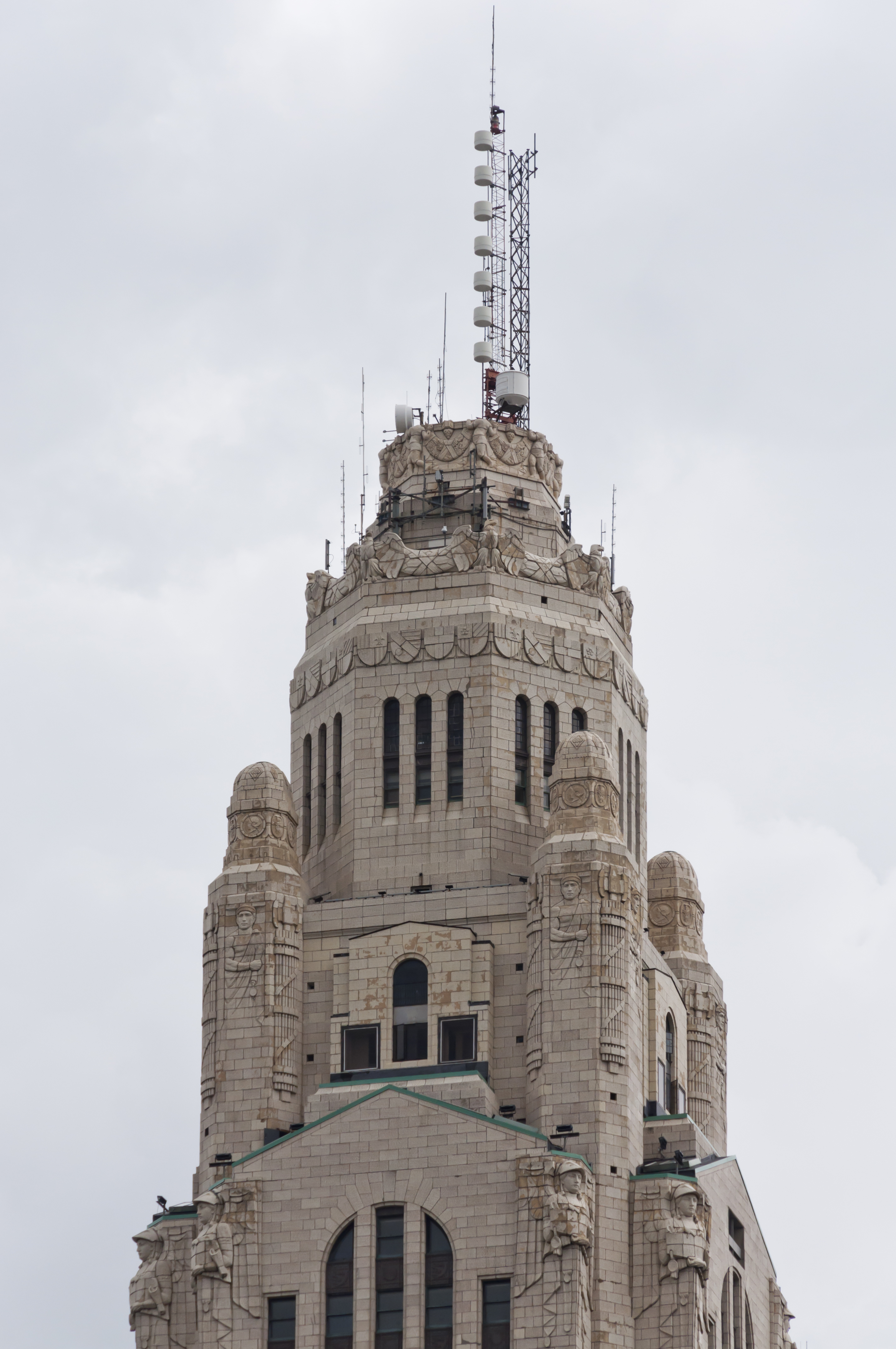
Detail of the Art Deco ornamentation on upper stories in September 2017

The original plan for the tower was to have three principal components: a 47-story tower flanked by a pair of 18-story wings, with a total rentable area of 353,768 square feet (32,866.1 m^{2}); the 2,827-seat Keith-Albee Theater (later renamed the Palace Theatre); and the 600-room Deshler-Wallick Hotel. It was to measure 188 feet (57 m) along both Broad and Front streets, with 44 floors of occupied space, and three additional floors helping it reach 555 feet 5 inches (169.29 m) in height. This intentionally set the building 5 inches (130 mm) taller than the Washington Monument.

Designed in the Art Deco or Art Moderne style, the building took inspiration from Byzantine architecture, particularly religious buildings constructed in the 4th through 13th centuries. Initially, Crane considered stone for the building's exterior but later decided on cream-colored terracotta despite concerns its blocks would be small and prone to warping. The design featured a large number of figures situated 495 feet (151 m) and higher along the building's façade and around its pinnacle, including eagles with wingspans up to 22 feet (6.7 m) and giants and angels up to 26 feet (7.9 m) tall. Some of these were later removed after concerns about falling materials and to obtain unobstructed penthouse views. An octagonal bartizan was designed at the top of the building with long, narrow loop windows, and it was topped by a dome with heraldic imagery. Inside, the building contained marble imported from Italy and Belgium, and public spaces were decorated with bronze and mosaics. The building lobby was designed with a marble floor with a bronze plaque containing the building's horoscope and which shows the positions of the planets at the time that the building's cornerstone was laid. Following completion, the building was lit at night to accentuate its architectural features, and its four turrets were also lit with floodlights to make a landmark for aviators, which at times made it visible for up to 20 miles (32 km) as a navigational aide. The top of the tower was also designed to accommodate mooring for zeppelins. Later, it housed radio antennae.

Elevators serving the building were a "micro self-leveling type", automatically controlled by push buttons and which could travel at 900 feet (270 m) per minute, which rose to the 41st floor. A shuttle elevator ran from there to the observation deck. Water tanks for fire protection and plumbing were placed on the 23rd and 43rd floors, and the building was also designed with duplicate mechanical systems for redundancy. An executive dining room, termed the Mid-Air Club, was built on the 43rd floor, sponsored by local businessmen and aviation enthusiasts. The 44th floor served as an observation deck that would be open to the public for 25 cents. The floor featured 24 floor-to-ceiling windows as well as an observation balcony on the 46th floor, which would be reachable only by ladder. In all, 60 construction contractor companies were named to build the structure, which cost a total of $7.8 million. Northwestern Terra Cotta Co. of Chicago supplied the materials wrapping the building. The American Insurance Union had a five-story auditorium building at 50 W. Broad St. which was torn down in preparation for the new tower. Colonial Theatre, opened at 1909 at 40 W. Broad St., was also closed and demolished in 1924 to make way for the tower.

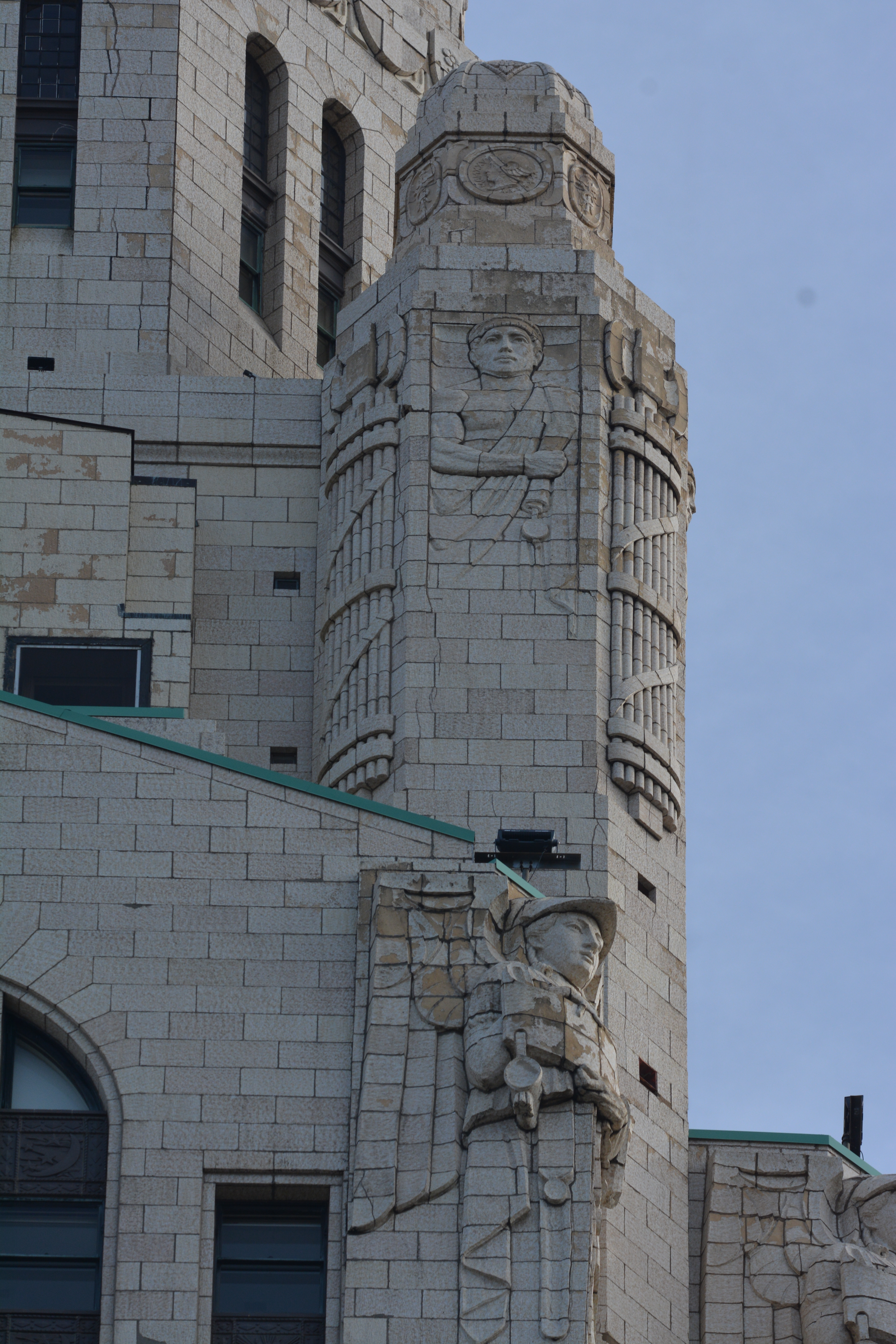
Details

At the height of construction, about 650 men would work on the structure at a time. Groundbreaking for the tower took place on September 23, 1924. Excavation commenced after that, with 44 caissons sunk 114 feet (35 m) into the bedrock for a foundation, through 80 feet (24 m) of water using air pressure. These tunnels were so deep that specialized crews of "sandhogs", who had gained experience building the Holland Tunnel in New York City, were brought in and the construction site had an on-site hospital and decompression chamber for men suffering from decompression sickness. On January 26, 1925, an accident occurred underground that killed four workers when a toxic gas was accidentally released during the setting of the caissons, overwhelming them and causing them to fall into the foundation. A fifth construction worker was killed later in the building's construction after falling from its steel framing. On February 13, 1926, the AIU Citadel's cornerstone was laid. The building's frame would consist of 10,000 tonnes (9,800 long tons; 11,000 short tons) of steel, and would be wired with 100 miles (160 km) of electrical wire, 137,000 feet (42,000 m) of heating pipe for thousands of radiators, 67 electrical motors, 14,000 electrical outlets, and 1,756 windows. Construction of the building took 19 months. It was dedicated on September 21, 1927. When complete, it was the tallest building in Columbus and the fifth tallest building in the world, including being the tallest building between New York City and Chicago. Albert Bushnell Hart, who spoke at the building's dedication, likened the building to the French fortified city Carcassonne.

The word "Citadel" has a peculiar significance as the architectural culmination of a great humanitarian institution. In the old days of strong fortifications, such cities as Nuremberg, Chester and Quebec were defended, first of all, by a surrounding wall, the foundations of which were protected by a moat. Within that wall was added, as a second line of defense, a Citadel, such as the lordly castle still standing inside the wall of that famous fortress, Carcassonne, in southern France. There the garrison could hold on that inner line of endurance. The name of Citadel is especially appropriate as a watchword of a great insurance company; for millions of families in the United States protect themselves, from the "terror by night and the destruction that wasteth at noonday" through this defensive institution. —Albert Bushnell Hart, speaking at the building's dedication, September 21, 1927.

Art and architecture critics spoke positively about the tower's design. Dudley Crafts Watson, director of Chicago Art Institute, highlighted it as one of five great examples of artistic achievement to come out of Columbus in the 1920s, calling it "the most original and American of skyscrapers" and "just an honest piece of magnificent construction." Writing in 1932 in the book Ohio Art and Artists, Edna Clarke called the building "a milestone in the growth of the city ... it signalizes the transformation from a large overgrown country town into a city. It stands out against the skyline so sharply it can't be ignored." Architectural Forum called it "splendid" and "impressive". The tower quickly became a symbol synonymous with Columbus and one of the city's most well-recognized landmarks. It was the first landmark that was easily visible from around the city.

The building's construction coincided with a rebuilding of the Columbus riverfront and creation of the Columbus Civic Center along the Scioto River following the Great Flood of 1913. In the 1920s and 1930s, the city saw a new Columbus City Hall built across the street, along with a new headquarters for the Columbus Police Department, a federal building and courthouse, and a state office building.

=== Lighting ===
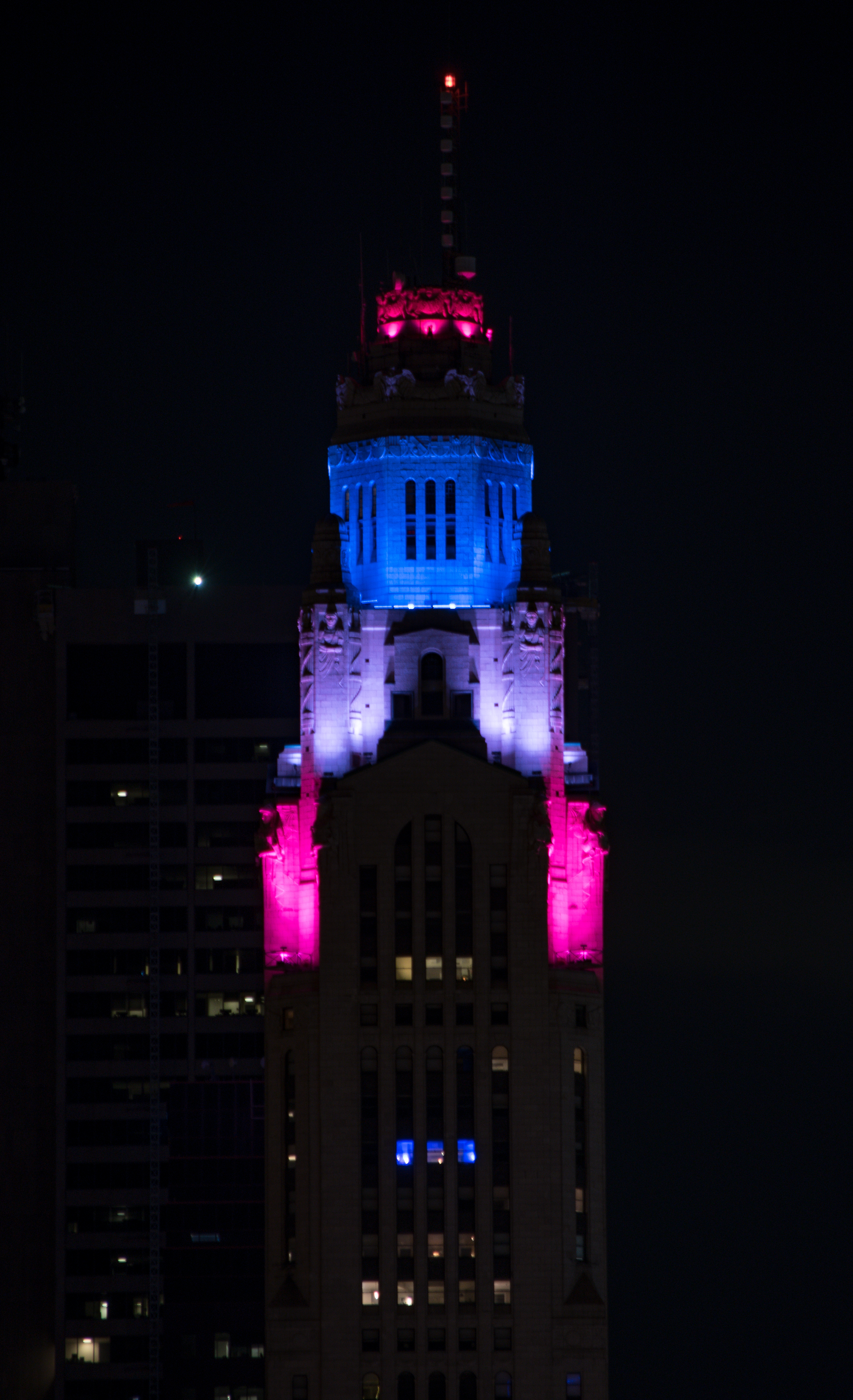
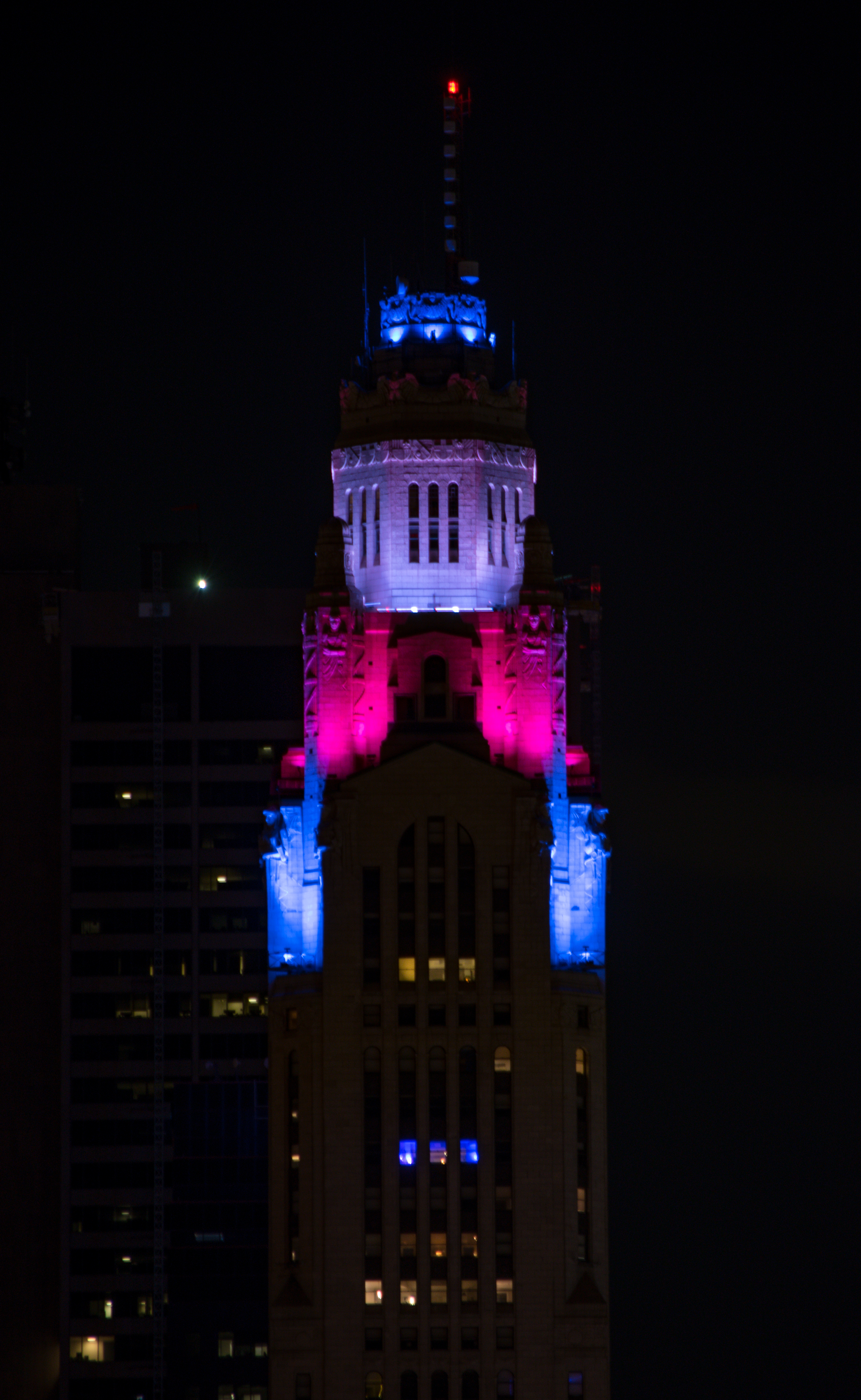
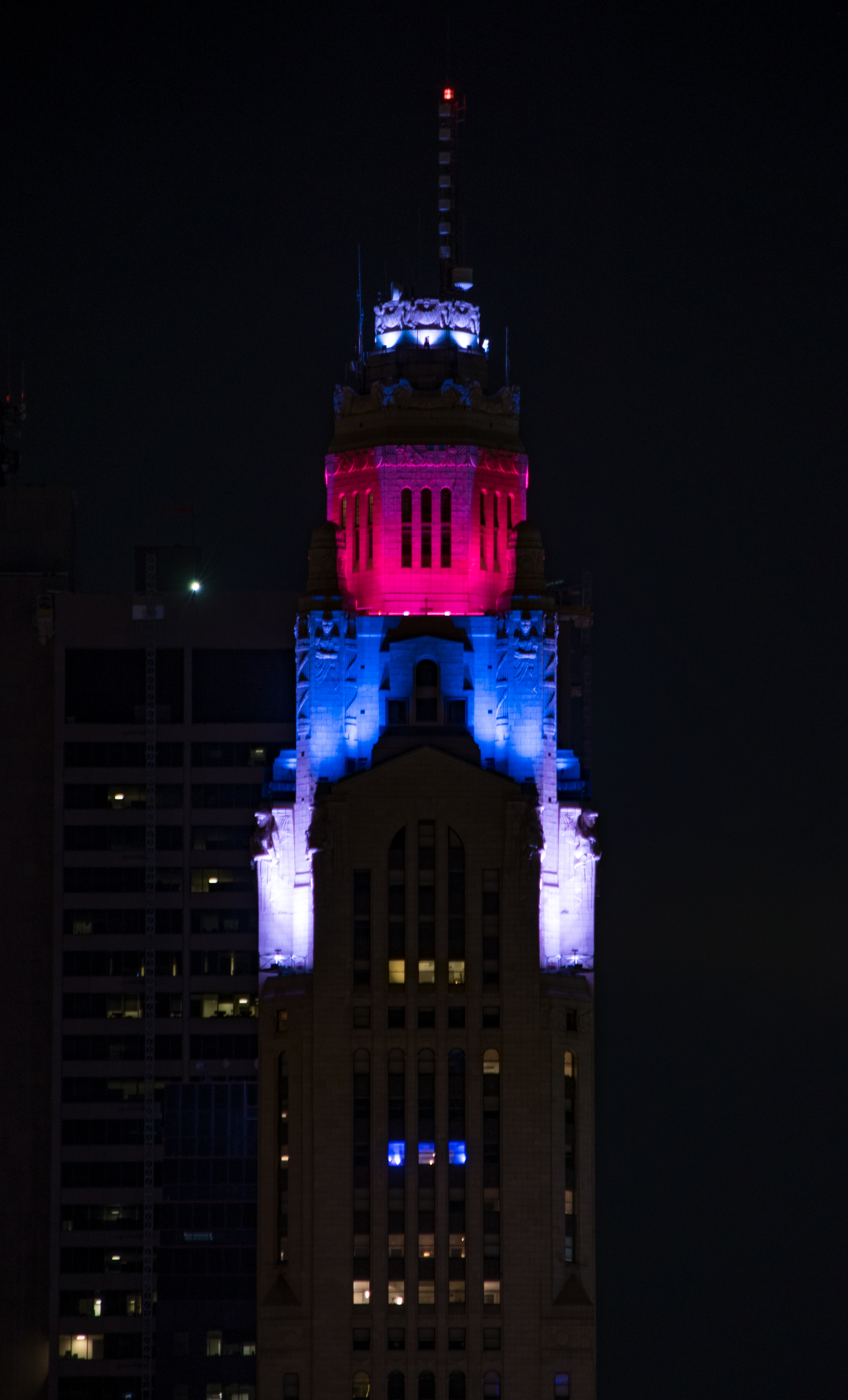
Cycling Memorial Day lighting, 2020

Floodlights were first installed on the LeVeque Tower in 1989, illuminating its top floors with white light from evening into the night. Later, the owners had theatrical gels installed to add colored lights as an option. During the building's 2012-17 restoration, the floodlights were replaced with computer-controlled LED lights to save on energy usage and allow for a wider array of color options. The new lights, ranging from 6-inch lights to 3-square-foot arrays, allow for 256 million color combinations. The building is now lit for events about six to eight times per year, including pink for the Susan G. Komen for the Cure breast cancer organization in April and May; rainbow colors during the Columbus Pride weekend in June; red, white, and blue for the Fourth of July; purple for Purple Heart recognition in August; teal for ovarian cancer awareness in September; and red and green during the Christmas and holiday season.

Interior

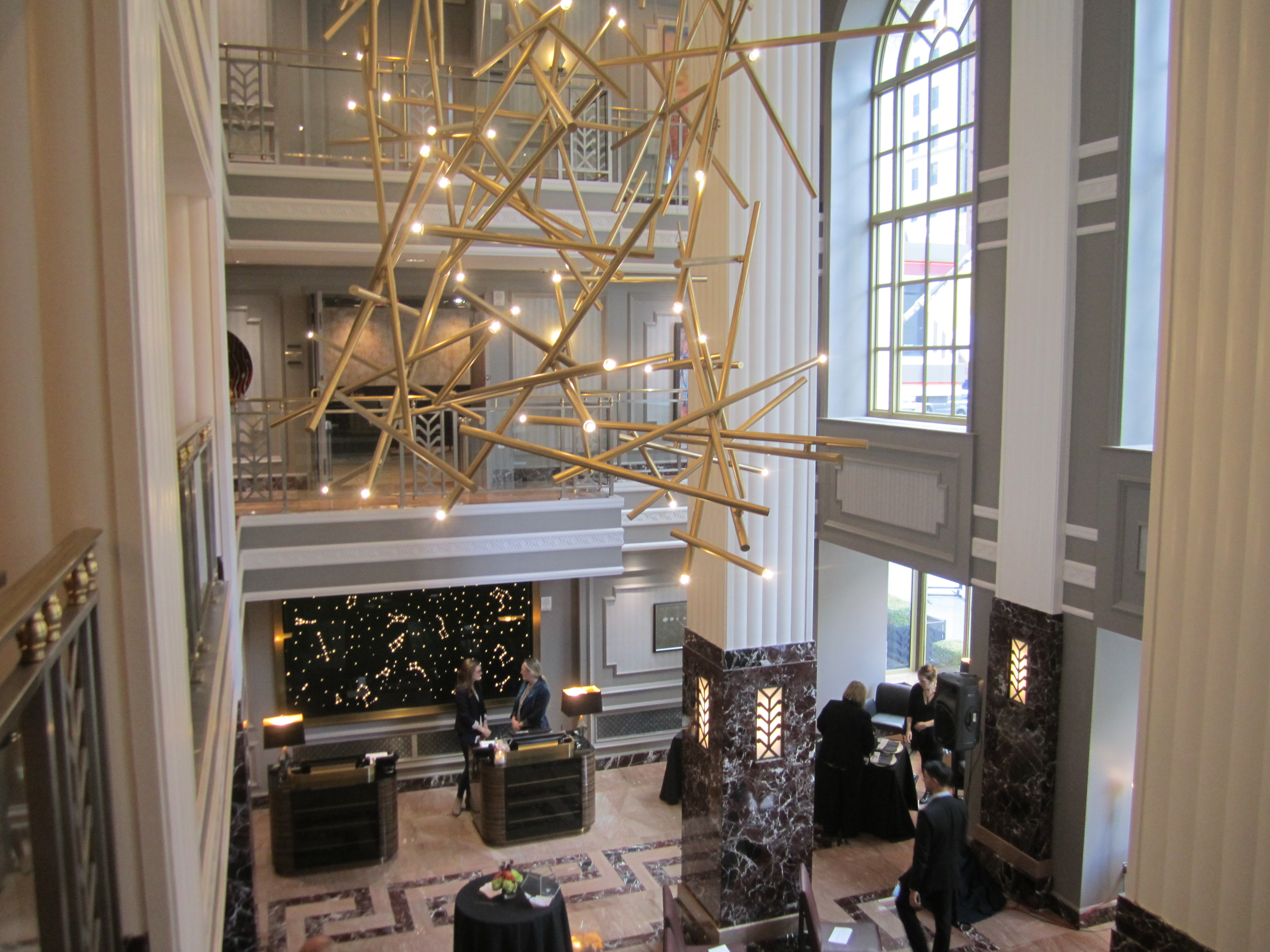
Hotel lobby

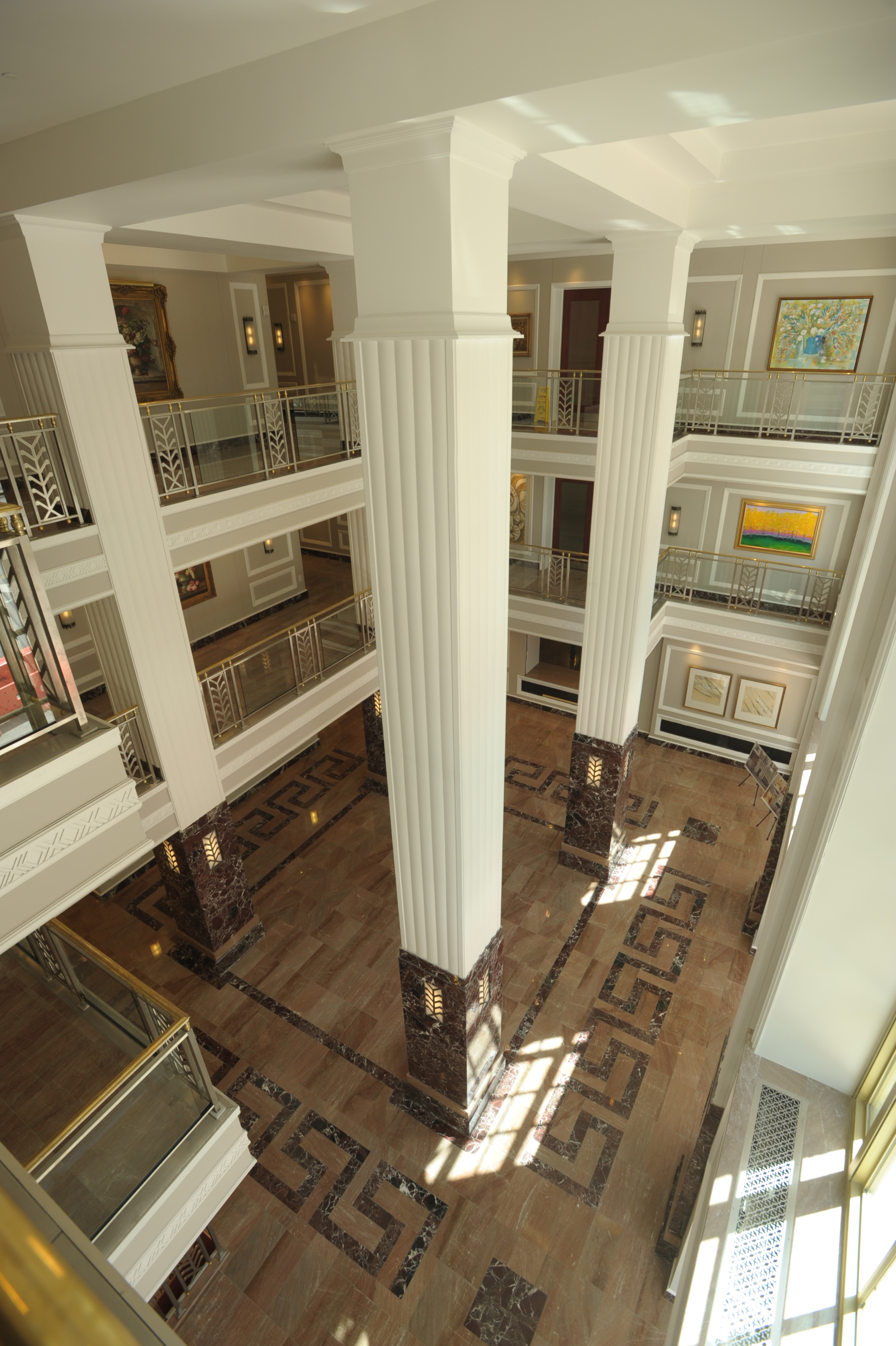
Empty lobby following renovation

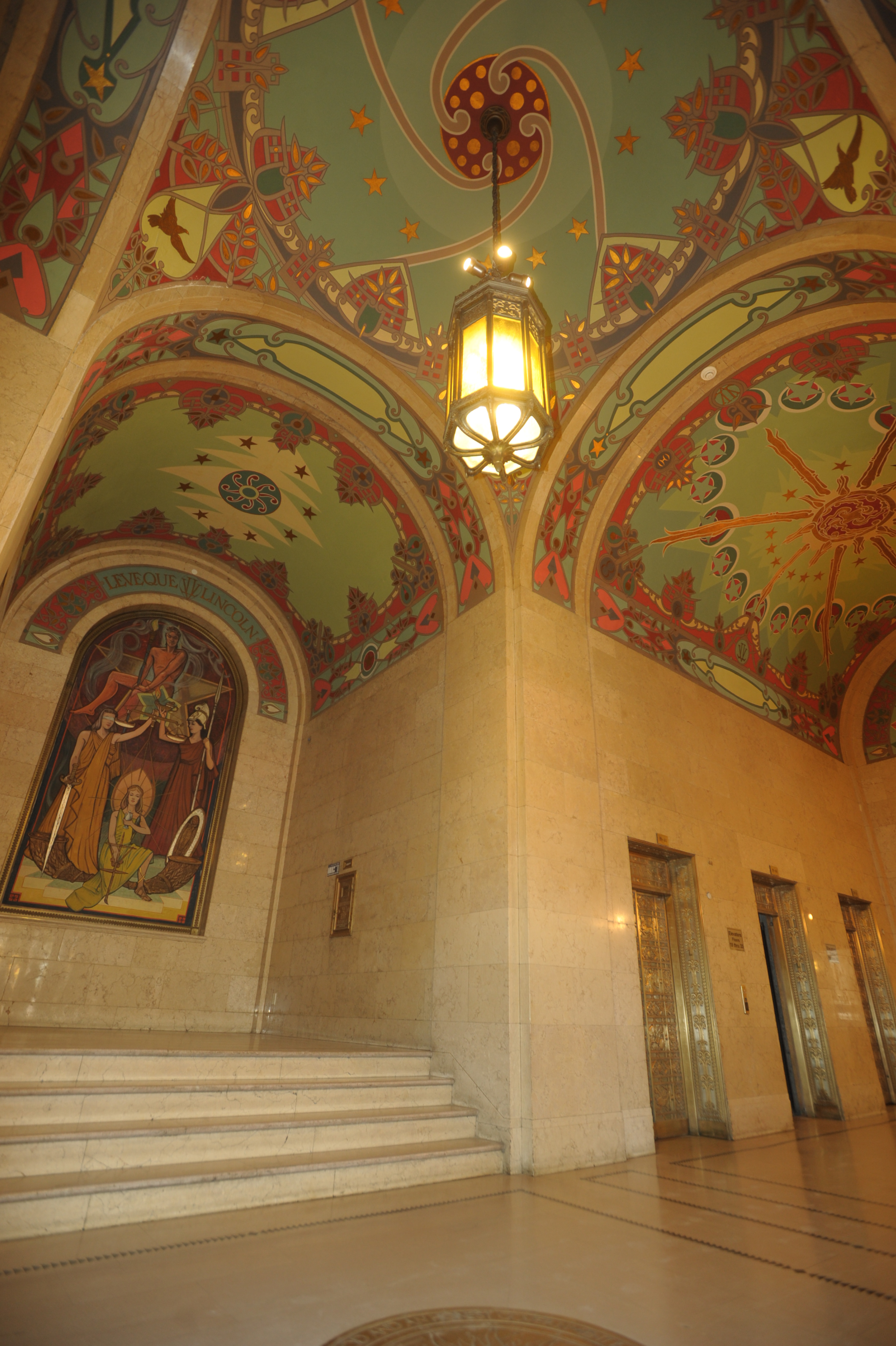
Residential lobby artwork

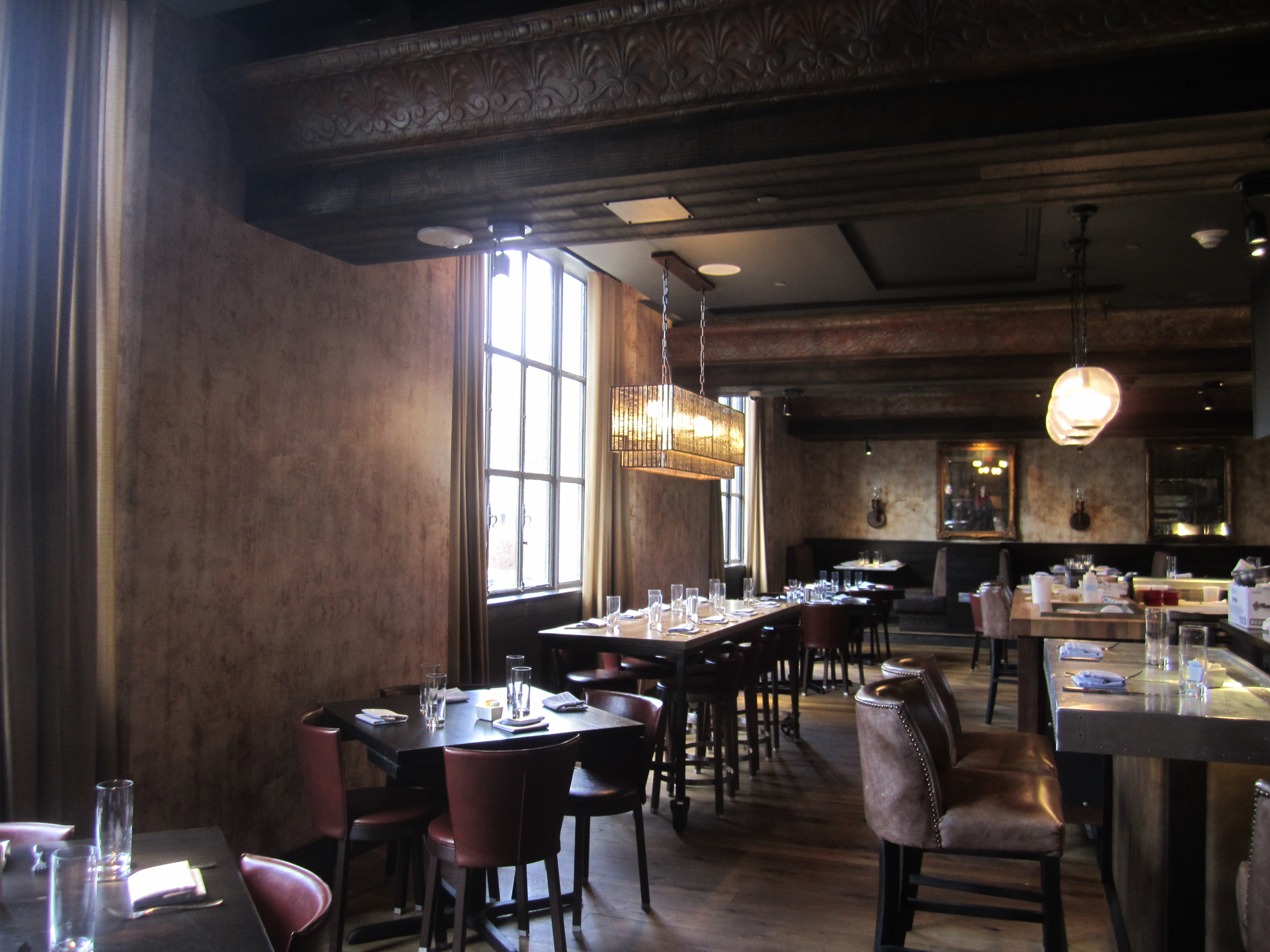
Restaurant

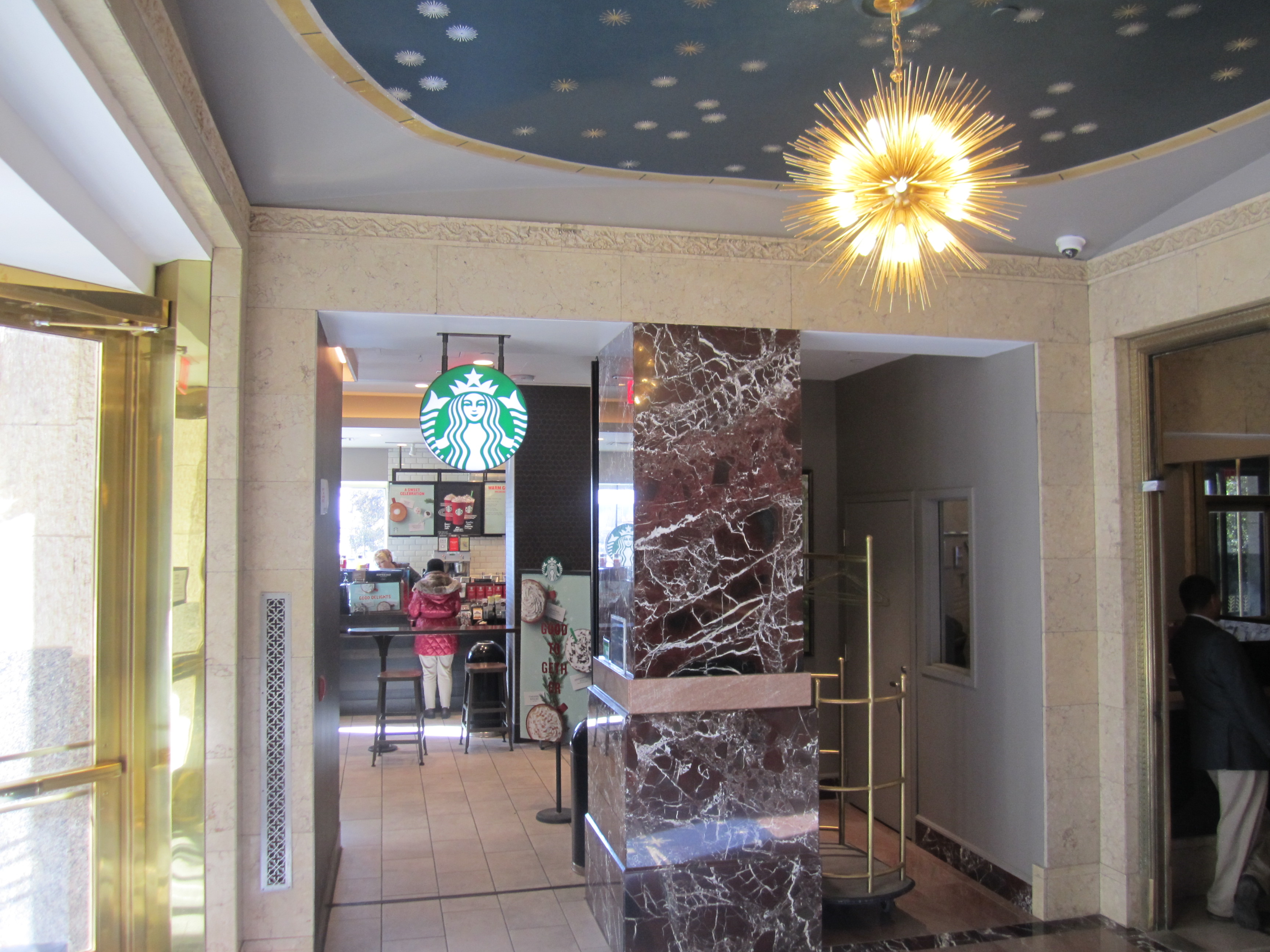
Starbucks cafe

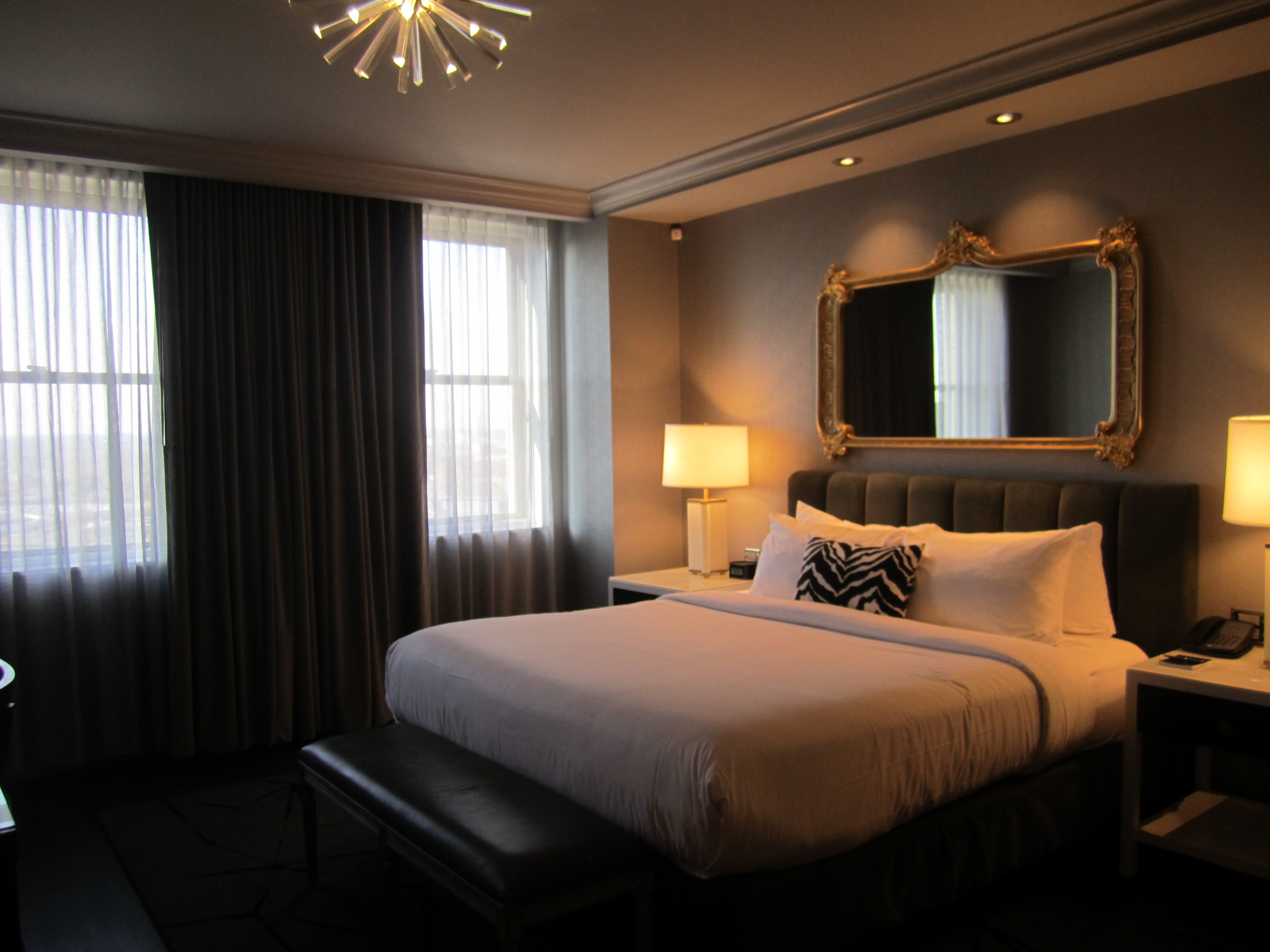
Hotel bedroom

== History ==
=== Changing function and ownership ===
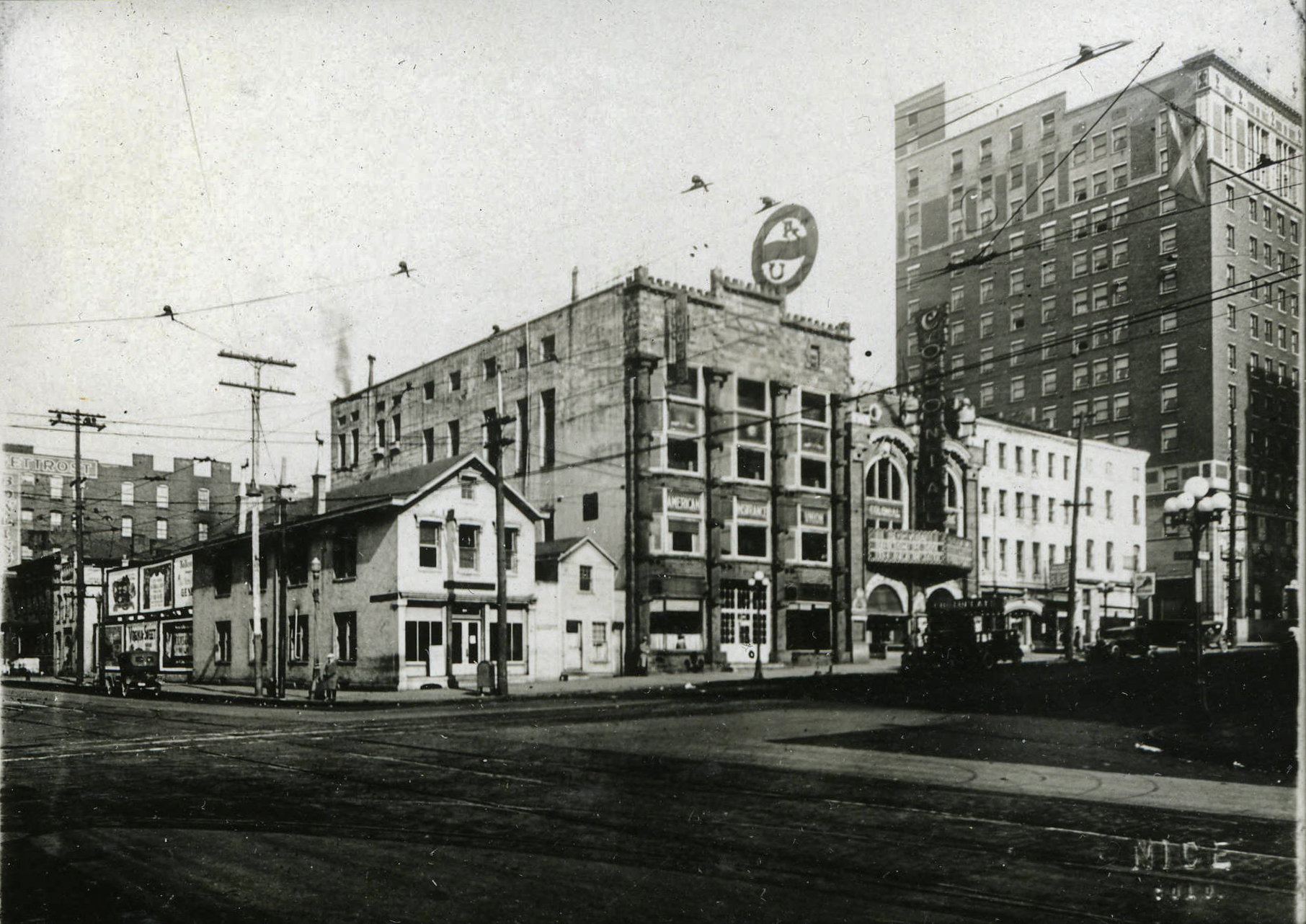
Buildings on the site of the skyscraper before demolition and construction, 1920

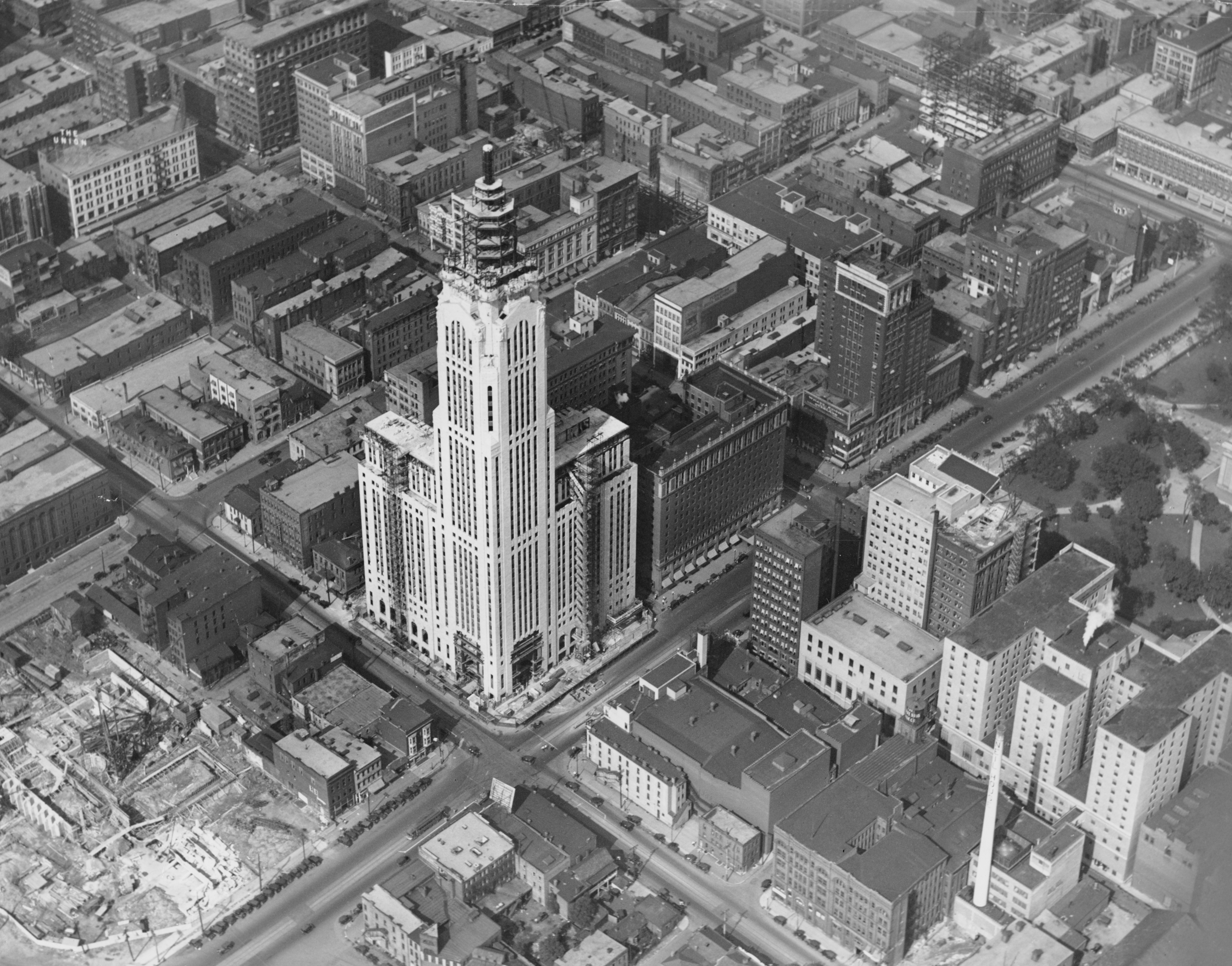
The tower under construction, 1926

After the tower's completion, the American Insurance Union occupied floors 19 and 20, with the remainder of the space available for rent to other office users. The construction of the building saw several significant cost overruns, prompting the American Insurance Union to dip into its monetary reserves to pay for the tower. Financial problems soon arose for the company, as the tower cost $800,000 more than its budget allowed for, and not all of the office space in the building filled up quickly.

The tower immediately became important to radio broadcasting in the city, which was increasing in prominence in the late 1920s. The building was an ideal height for broadcasting and there were no mountains or other intervening structures around Central Ohio to disrupt radio signals broadcast from antennae at the tower's apex. The tower thus became home to a number of radio stations, including WAIU. Lentz had purchased WAIU in 1925 to serve as a platform for his progressive views. Moving into the tower allowed WAIU to increase its broadcasting power to 5,000 watts. By the 1980s, WCOL had a broadcast room atop the tower.

The American Insurance Union failed during the Great Depression, and it was reorganized as the American Insurance Union Inc. in 1931. The entity survived until 1934 when it went into receivership, and then ceased to exist. During this time, the tower was known pejoratively as the "IOU Tower" given the financial difficulties of its owner. After the company went bankrupt, the group marketed the building in order to pay off unpaid policies. It ultimately sold to Leslie LeVeque and John Lincoln in 1945 and was renamed the Lincoln-LeVeque Tower. LeVeque was a local real estate investor, and after his death, his son Fred LeVeque and his wife, Katherine LeVeque, became prominent figures in the Columbus community.

=== Competition ===
The tower dominated the Columbus skyline, which did not see significant high-rise construction until the 1960s, though there was at least one major attempt to build another high-rise in the city in 1953. The Lincoln-LeVeque Tower was the only building in Columbus taller than 300 feet (91 m) until 1962. As a number of other major commercial ventures like the Huntington National Bank and American Electric Power flourished in the city, its urban core saw construction of new high-rises to suit them. The building remained the tallest structure in Columbus until the Rhodes State Office Tower was completed in 1974. The Lincoln-LeVeque Tower was added to the National Register of Historic Places in 1975. Around 1975, Fred LeVeque bought the Palace Theatre and was killed in an airplane crash in January of that year, leaving Katherine LeVeque president of the company's prominent Columbus real estate group, LeVeque Enterprises. Columbus' downtown office market saw some issues with high vacancy rates, but the tower itself retained higher-than-average occupancy rates.

Katherine LeVeque took complete control of the building through a trust in 1977. That year, the name was officially changed to the LeVeque Tower. It faced increasing competition from other office buildings being constructed in Downtown Columbus in the 1980s, and LeVeque put $18 million into renovations to keep the historic tower competitive with newer and more modern office space, including an entirely new HVAC system, energy efficiency upgrades, and updates to the bathrooms and public areas of the building. In 1984, the opening of Huntington Center, Capitol Square and One Columbus Center put 2,000,000 square feet (190,000 m^{2}) of new office space on the market in Downtown Columbus.

The State of Ohio was a major tenant in the building for a significant part of its history. The Ohio Department of Job and Family Services leased nearly 20 percent of the building until it moved in 2003, and the Ohio Department of Aging was a major tenant as well. Additionally, a number of law firms and private financial services entities leased space in the building. The loss of the major state organizations in the tower significantly hurt the building's ability to pay for its mortgage, and in 2004, an affiliate of Miami-based LNR Property Corp. took control of the tower, which was then valued at $22 million. LeVeque turned the building over to the new ownership group in lieu of a foreclosure on a $16.2 million mortgage on the building, and at this point it was about a third empty. She had previously engaged an architect on a proposal to convert part of the building to residential use, but it was deemed not financially feasible at the time.

In 2005, the building was sold again to Finsilver/Friedman Management Corp. for $8.5 million. At the time of the sale, the building remained about a third empty. The new building owner committed to substantial upgrades to the tower to keep it competitive. The renovations helped it land some smaller tenants in the office space. Leasing there, though, remained poor and by 2009 its office space was still about a third empty, in spite of the change of leasing teams several times.

=== 2012 renovation ===
In 2011, the tower was purchased by Tower 10 LLC, a joint venture of Columbus real estate investors including Bob Meyers, Don Casto and Michael Schiff, for $4 million. By that point, the office building's vacancy rate had risen to 43 percent. The partners planned a $22 million project to fix cracked terracotta on the tower and convert it from an office building to a hotel and residential structure. In 2012, the owners announced the renovation would cost $26.7 million, including $5 million in tax credits from the State of Ohio for the renovation.

The renovation project, completed in 2017, saw extensive work to repair the building's terracotta facade and modernize its interior. LeVeque Tower was redesigned as a mixed use development, with floors 5 to 10 of the building converted into a 150-room boutique hotel, the Hotel LeVeque under Marriott International's Autograph Collection brand, and with some event space. Floors 3, 4, and 11-18 were renovated as 160,000 square feet of office space, while the remaining 19 floors were converted into upscale residential units, a mix of 68 apartments and 12 condominiums, with two penthouse units on the top floors. A restaurant, The Keep, was opened by Illinois-based First Hospitality Group Inc. on the second floor.

In recent years, the building's third floor has held a U.S. Immigration and Customs Enforcement (ICE) office and detention center. The center has been the subject of numerous protests against unfair treatment of undocumented immigrants.

== Associated amenities ==
=== Deshler Hotel ===
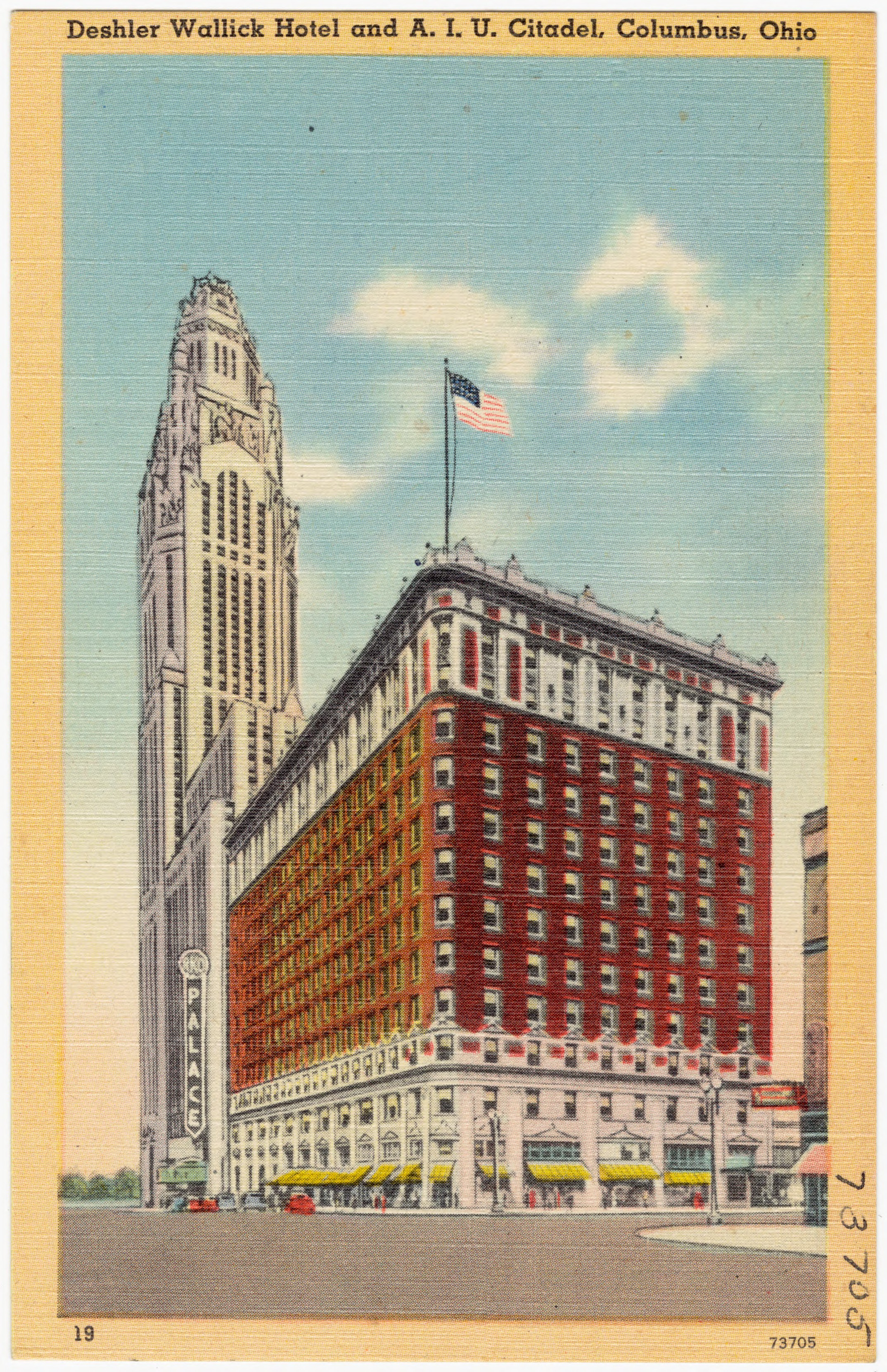
Early postcard of the new skyscraper beside the Deshler-Wallick Hotel

The building's two wings were used as an extra 600 rooms for the Deshler Hotel, which had been built at the northwest corner of Broad and High streets. Announced in 1912 and opened in 1916, the hotel already had 400 rooms, intended to rival the other luxury hotels of the world. The hotel was later leased by Lew and Adrian Wallick, hoteliers from Ohio and New York. Called the Deshler-Wallick Hotel by the time the LeVeque tower opened, the 600 rooms were accessible by a "venetian bridge" linking the two buildings on the second floor. New York Mayor Jimmy Walker, who attended the opening, tried and nearly succeeded in having a ceremonial sip of wine in each of the 600 hotel rooms. The hotel would later host President Harry S. Truman in 1946 during a meeting of the Federal Council of Churches of Christ. He and Bess Truman would later stay at the hotel again in 1953. In 1947 the hotel sold to Julius Epstein of Chicago, apparently for $2 million, who again sold it five years later to the Hilton Hotels chain, which renamed the hotel the Deshler-Hilton. In 1964 it was sold to a company owned by Charles Cole who renamed it the Deshler-Cole. Cole eliminated the 600 rooms located inside LeVeque Tower and invested $2 million to remodel the hotel. The hotel rooms in the building's wings having been eliminated, the "venetian bridge" was demolished. The building was sold a final time to Fred Beasley in 1966 and renamed the Deshler-Beasley before being closed in 1968 and demolished in 1969. Today the site is the home of the One Columbus Center, a tower developed in part by LeVeque Enterprises.

=== Palace Theatre ===
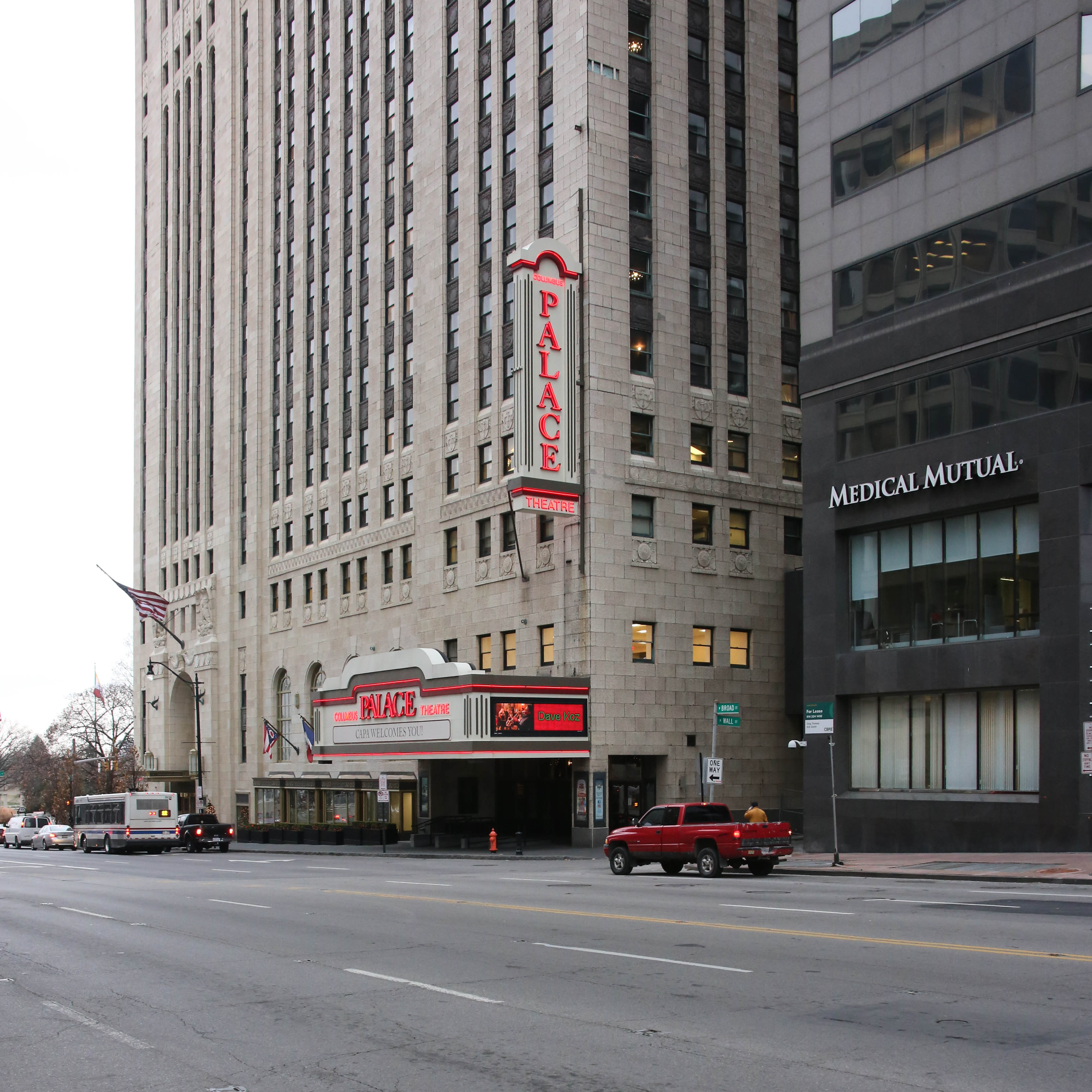
The Palace Theatre entrance and marquee on the south facade of the LeVeque Tower

Palace Theatre, at 34 W. Broad St., opened November 8, 1926 as a vaudeville house under the Keith-Albee name. A number of famous performers would appear there, some before their careers took off. Among them were Bing Crosby, George Burns, Gracie Allen, Gypsy Rose Lee, Jack Benny, Tom Mix, Jackie Gleason, The Three Stooges, Eddie Cantor and Mae West, who performed in March 1938 and broke all its previous attendance records. It hosted a number of bands in the 1940s, including Duke Ellington, Tommy Dorsey, Glenn Miller, Louis Armstrong, Count Basie, Guy Lombardo, Benny Goodman and Lionel Hampton. The theatre hosted the world premiere of The Male Animal on March 12, 1942, which was attended by Henry Fonda, Olivia de Havilland, James Thurber and Joan Leslie.

Closing in 1975, the property fell vacant and was proposed for demolition in order for a parking lot to be constructed. In 1980, the theatre was renovated and restored by Katherine LeVeque using her personal funds, and began hosting a new set of acts. Among these, it brought in Red Skelton, Sammy Davis Jr., Mickey Rooney, Tom Jones, Natalie Cole, Judy Collins, Joe Walsh and Tony Bennett. The venue has come to host Broadway theatre acts. Palace Theatre remains in operation with a main 2,827-seat auditorium, designed as a vaudeville house and movie theater. It was acquired by the Columbus Association for the Performing Arts in 1989.

While the LeVeque Tower was designed by Detroit architect C. Howard Crane, who was noted for designing over 250 theatres across North America, the Palace Theatre within the LeVeque Tower was designed by another leading theatre architect, Thomas W. Lamb. Lamb was the preferred architect of the Keith Albee theatre chain.

== See also ==
- List of Art Deco architecture in the United States
- National Register of Historic Places listings in Columbus, Ohio
