= Palace Theatre (Columbus, Ohio) =

Performing arts center in Columbus, Ohio, a former movie theater

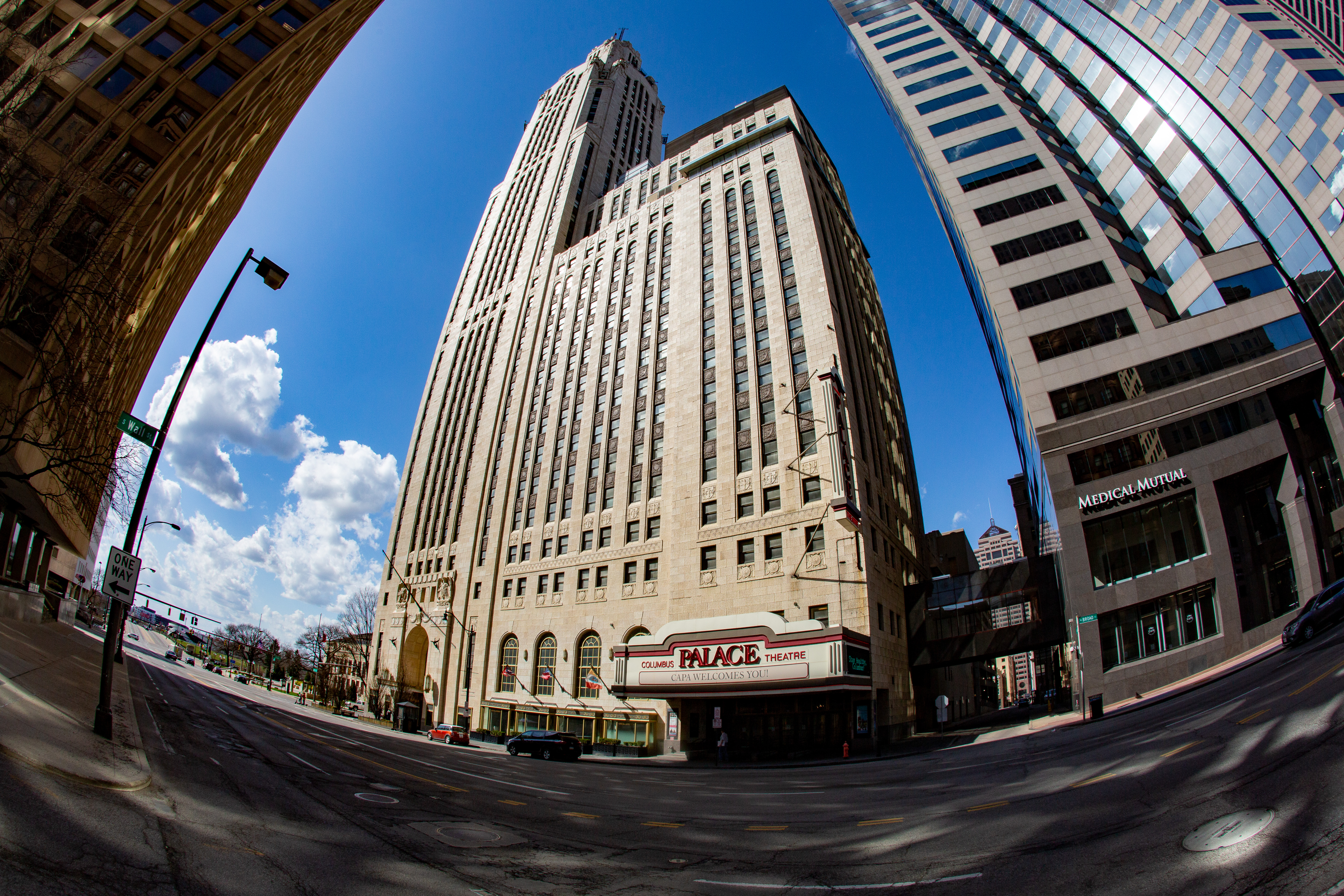
- The Palace Theatre and LeVeque Tower
- Interactive map of Palace Theatre
- Former names: Keith-Albee Palace, RKO Palace
- Location: 34 W. Broad Street, Columbus, Ohio
- Coordinates: 39.962372°N 83.002042°W
- Operator: Columbus Association for the Performing Arts
- Capacity: 2,695
- Current use: Performing arts center
- Public transit: 4, 5, 7, 10, 11; CoGo

Construction
- Opened: 1926
- Architect: Thomas W. Lamb

Website
- www.capa.com/venues/palace-theatre

The Palace Theatre is a 2,695-seat restored movie palace located at 34 W. Broad Street in Columbus, Ohio. It was designed and built in 1926 by the American architect Thomas W. Lamb as part of the American Insurance Union Citadel (now the LeVeque Tower). Today the theater functions as a multi-use performing arts venue. It is owned and operated by the Columbus Association for the Performing Arts. The Palace Theater's "house" is considered separate from LeVeque Tower, while the marquee and lobby are part of the LeVeque complex.

== History ==
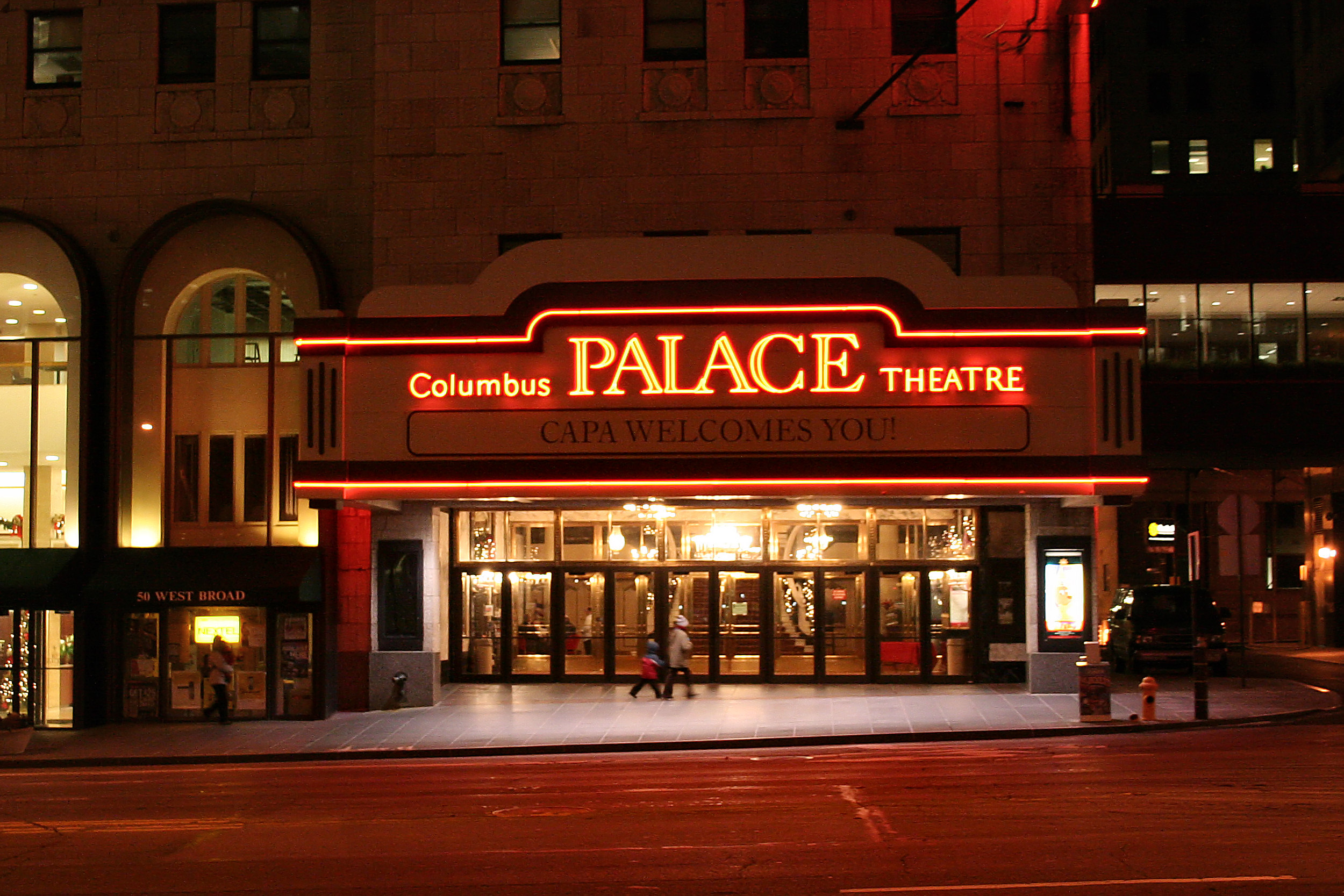
The Palace Theatre entrance at night

The Palace Theatre was designed by Thomas W. Lamb in his signature "Adam" style, reminiscent of the 18th century neo-classical work of the Scottish architects James and Robert Adam. Originally named the Keith-Albee Theatre, its construction was personally supervised by the vaudeville mogul Edward Albee of the Keith-Albee circuit. It opened in 1926 as the Keith-Albee Palace and featured live vaudeville along with silent feature films, an orchestra and "Miss Buckeye", a Style 260 3/16 Mighty Wurlitzer Theatre Pipe Organ.

The dressing room tower in the backstage area was designed as a small hotel, complete with a "front desk", where performers picked up their room keys and mail. Kitchen facilities and a children’s playroom were available. The dressing rooms are named after cities on the vaudeville touring routes. The under-stage room includes an animal shower and small sanitary stable, along with a ramp built for hoofed animals to help facilitate their transport to and from the stage during the Vaudeville era.

In 1929, the Keith-Albee Palace was renamed the RKO (Radio Keith Orpheum) Palace. The theater was closed as a movie theater by RKO in 1975. It was later renovated and preserved by owner Katherine LeVeque as a home for Opera Columbus and touring Broadway shows. In 1989, the Palace Theatre was purchased by the non-profit theater management company CAPA, which consolidated its administrative functions with those of the Ohio Theatre. The Palace now hosts performances by the Columbus Symphony Orchestra, the Jazz Arts Group, the Broadway Series, and scores of CAPA-sponsored shows.

The Palace's Wurlitzer organ was removed in 1968 by the Central Ohio Theatre Organ Society “COTOS”. In 1976, COTOS formed an agreement with Worthington City Schools to install the organ inside the new Hottenroth Auditorium at Thomas Worthington High School in Worthington, Ohio. In 2022, Worthington voters passed a tax levy calling for the demolition & re-construction of Thomas Worthington High School. The organ, having sat dormant since COTOS dissolved almost a decade prior, was removed & placed in storage in May 2024 prior to the auditorium’s demolition, which was completed in August.
