= Columbus Association for the Performing Arts =

American non-profit organization

Coordinates: 39°57′36″N 82°59′56″W

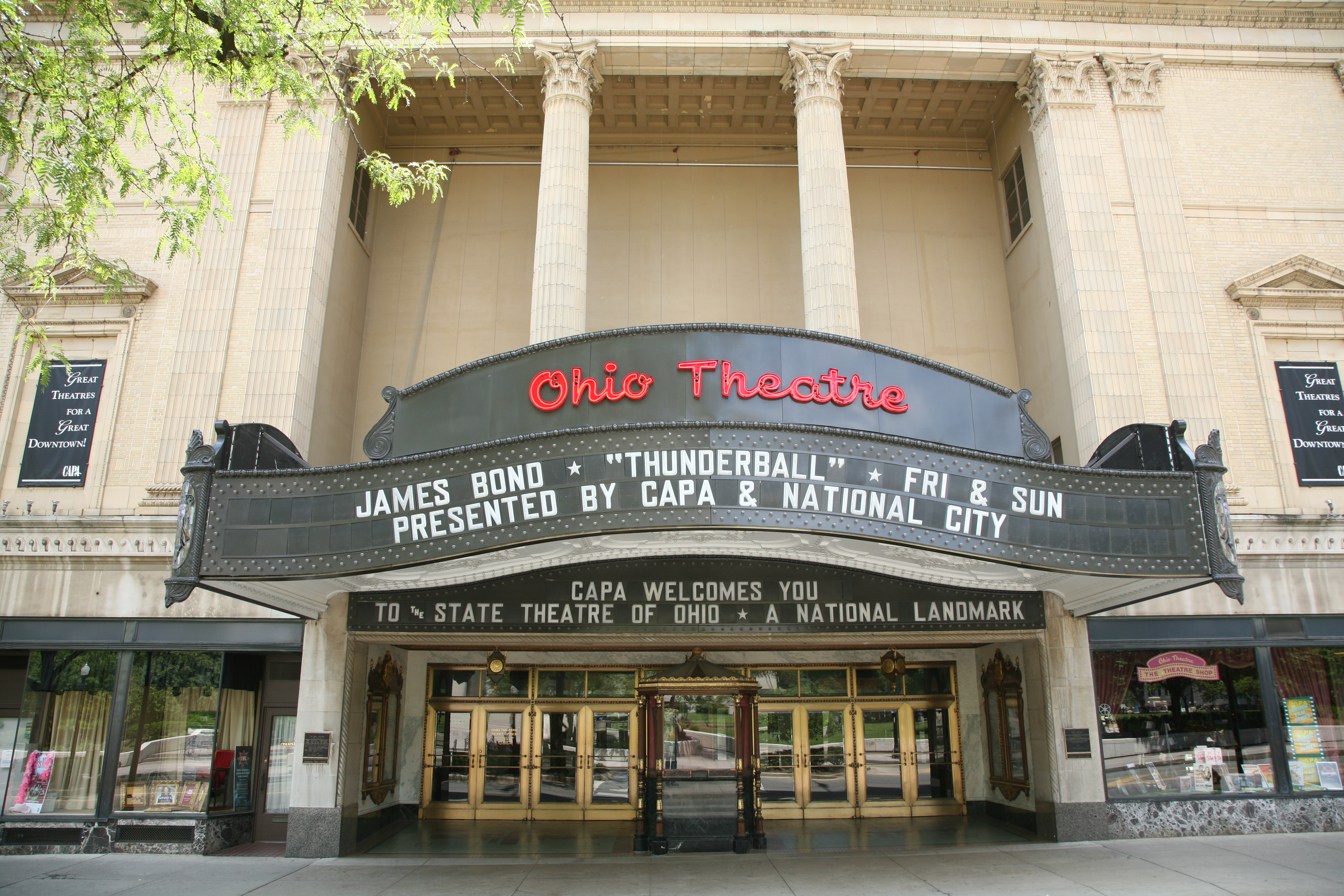
The Ohio Theatre, Columbus, Ohio.

The Columbus Association for the Performing Arts (CAPA) is non-profit arts and theater management organization based in Columbus, Ohio.

== History ==
CAPA was formed in 1969 by Robert Karlsberger, Lawrence L. Fisher, Jean Whallon, and Scott Whitlock to raise money to save the Ohio Theatre, a 1928 movie palace, from demolition and revive it for use as a performing arts center.

CAPA's initial success in restoring and operating the Ohio has led over the years to a great expansion of its activities. It took over ownership and operations of the Palace Theatre in the early 1990s. In 1998 it purchased and completely rebuilt and restored the historic 1890s Southern Theatre. Later CAPA took over management of Columbus's Capitol Theater complex for the State of Ohio.

Outside of Columbus, CAPA managed the historic Chicago Theatre from 1998 to 2003, and took over operations of the Shubert Theatre in New Haven, Connecticut in 2001.

CAPA was responsible for overseeing the 2009 $13.5 million renovation of the Lincoln Theatre in Columbus's historic King-Lincoln neighborhood. CAPA will also operate that theater, combining with ten local arts organizations to provide a varied slate of events for the new community arts center.

The most recent addition to the list of theaters operated by CAPA is the Valentine Theatre in Toledo, Ohio. On June 22, 2009 the Toledo Cultural Arts Center announced that they had initiated a five-year agreement with CAPA to oversee operations of the 114-year-old landmark theater. Recently the recipient of a multimillion-dollar renovation, the theater is home to forty of Toledo's performing arts groups, including the Toledo Symphony Orchestra.

In addition to operating theaters, CAPA oversees administrative operations for the Columbus non-profit cultural groups Franklin Park Conservatory, Opera Columbus, The Contemporary Theatre of Ohio.

CAPA is a non-profit organization overseen by an independent board of directors. Its main offices are located in the Ohio Theatre building at 55 E. State St and the president & CEO was William B. "Bill" Conner, Jr. prior to his death of cancer in October 2016.

Chad Whittington has been the president & CEO of CAPA since 2017.

== Managed properties ==
=== Current ===
Venue	Location	Type	Seats	Opened	Acquired
Ohio Theatre	Downtown, Columbus, Ohio	Movie palace	2,791	1928	1969
Southern Theatre	South High Commercial Historic District,Columbus, Ohio	Movie palace	933	1894	1986
Palace Theatre	Downtown, Columbus, Ohio	Movie palace	2,695	1926	1989
Riffe Center Theatre Complex	Capitol Square, Columbus, Ohio	Auditorium, Dance studio	854	1989	1994
Shubert Theatre	New Haven, Connecticut	Theater	1,600	1914	2001
Lincoln Theatre	King-Lincoln Bronzeville, Columbus, Ohio	Movie palace	582	1928	2007
Drexel Theater	Bexley, Ohio	Movie theater	730	1937	2011
The Jeanne B. McCoy Community Center for the Arts	New Albany, Ohio	Arts centre	786	2008	2013
Charleen & Charles Hinson Amphitheater	New Albany, Ohio	Amphitheatre	800	2021	2021
Garden Theater	The Short North, Columbus, Ohio	Auditorium	300	1920	2023
Idea Foundry	Franklinton, Columbus, Ohio	Makerspace	–	2014	2026

=== Former ===
Venue	Location	Type	Seats	Opened	Acquired	Ended
Chicago Theatre	Chicago	Theater	3,600	1921	1998	2003
Valentine Theatre	Toledo, Ohio	Theater	901	1895	2009	2014
