= Lincoln Theatre (Columbus, Ohio) =

- U.S. National Register of Historic Places
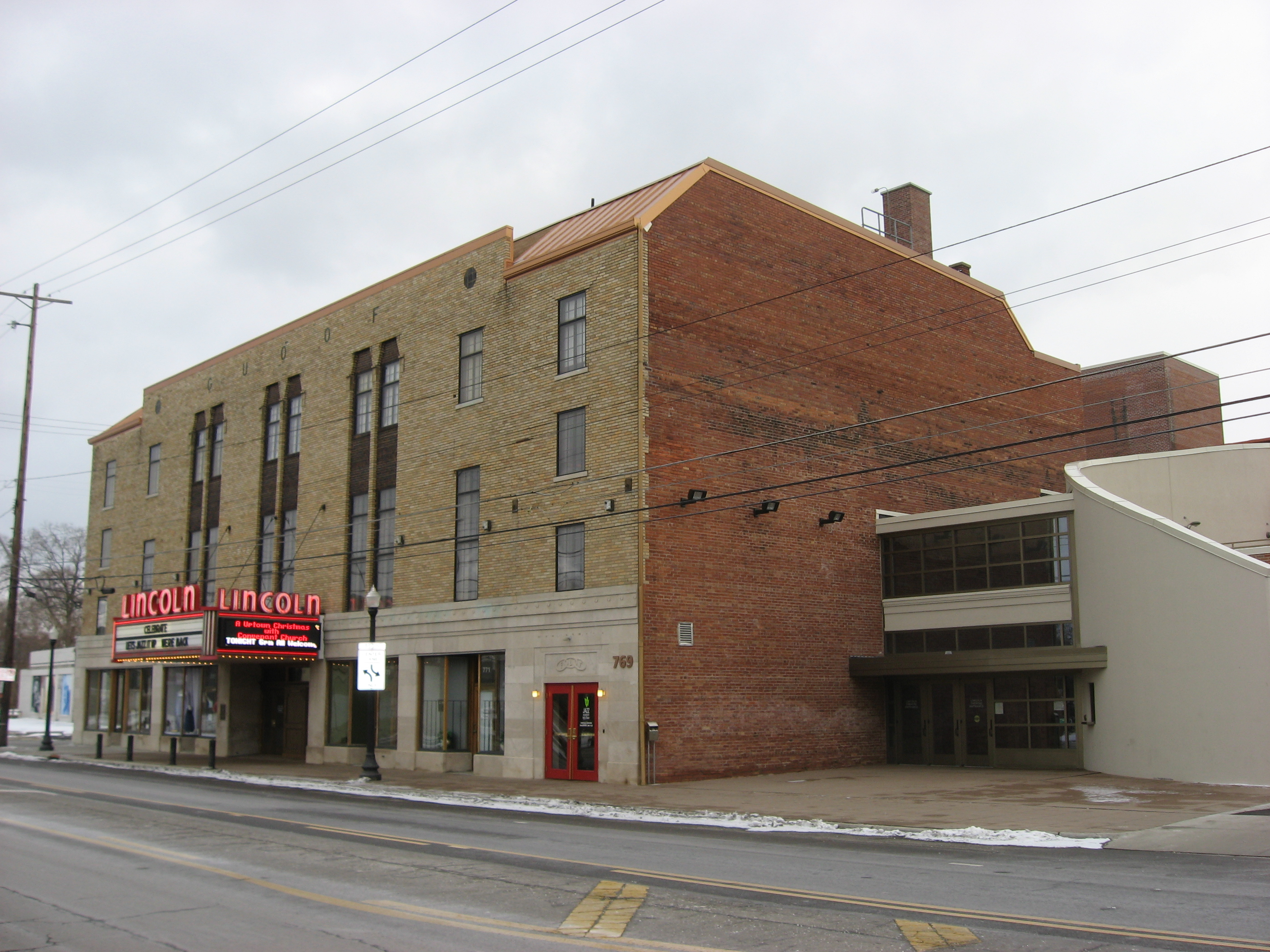
- Front and side of the theater
- Interactive map highlighting the theater's location
- Location: 77 E. Long St., Columbus, Ohio
- Coordinates: 39°58′1″N 82°58′52″W
- Area: less than one acre
- Architect: Carl Anderson
- Architectural style: Exotic Revival, Egyptian Revival
- NRHP reference No.: 92001355
- Added to NRHP: October 8, 1992

The Lincoln Theatre is a 582-seat performing arts venue located at 769 E. Long Street in the King-Lincoln Bronzeville neighborhood of Columbus, Ohio. The theater is owned by the City of Columbus under the auspices of the Lincoln Theatre Association. Operation of the facility is managed by CAPA. It was listed on the National Register of Historic Places in 1992.

== History ==
Opened on November 26, 1928 as the Ogden Theatre, the theater was developed by the local entrepreneur Al Jackson and designed by architect Carl Anderson. It fulfilled a then pressing need of the African-American community in Columbus for its own entertainment and cultural center. Designed in the Egyptian Revival style, it originally offered films along with live vaudeville and musical performers. The large ballroom was also used for social events. The theater was renamed the Lincoln in 1939 and continued operating as a movie theater through the 1960s. It also regularly presented musical artists including local star Nancy Wilson, Count Basie, and Cab Calloway.

Closed from the early 1970s, the Lincoln was the object of numerous unrealized restoration projects in the following decades. Finally, in 2007, the current Lincoln Theatre Association led a coalition of supporters including the City of Columbus, Mayor Michael B. Coleman, Franklin County, and local businesses to launch a thorough renovation of the theater. Combining restoration of the original Egyptian-themed decorative elements with completely modern facilities, seating and stage equipment, the renovated venue reopened to the public on May 25, 2009 with an open house. The first performance featured Broadway star Maurice Hines on May 28, 2009. Hines was also named Artistic Director in Residence for the year 2009.

The theater is operated by CAPA and is creating partnerships with ten local performing arts organizations to present a varied slate of events. One of these, the Columbus Jazz Arts Group will present concerts at the theater and it will also operate a Jazz Academy in a new facility on the upper floors of the Lincoln building. The Jazz Academy will offer music education and coaching sessions and informal performances. The Columbus Gay Men's Chorus also performs two shows there each season.

The Lincoln Theatre is listed on the National Register of Historic Places. Its restoration and reopening are a key part of the City of Columbus's long-term plan to redevelop the historic King-Lincoln neighborhood.
