= Ohio Theatre (Columbus, Ohio) =

Theater and former movie theater in Columbus, Ohio

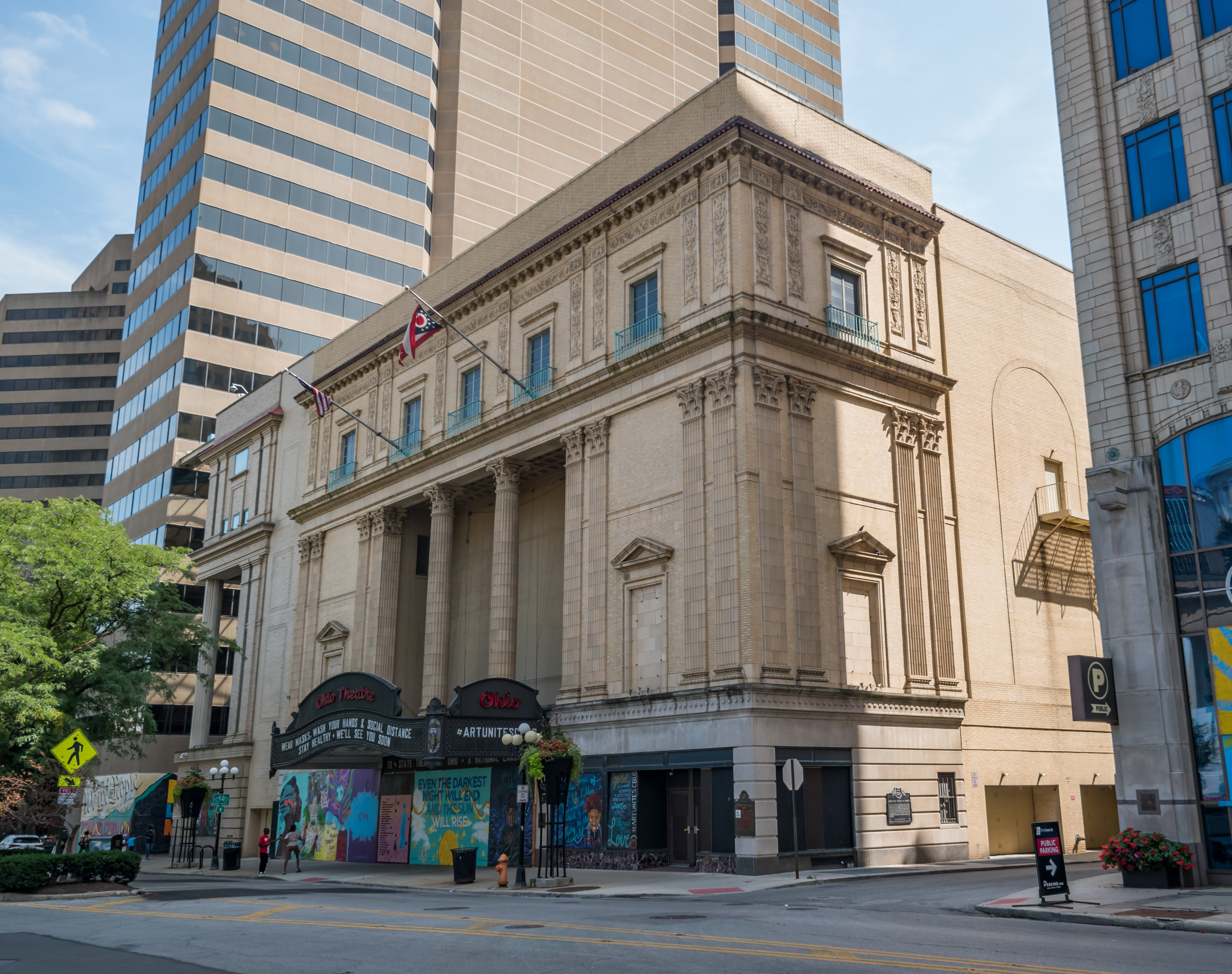
- The Ohio Theatre in 2020
- Address: 39 E. State Street; Columbus, Ohio; United States
- Owner: Columbus Association for the Performing Arts
- Capacity: 2,791
- Type: Movie palace
- Screen: 1
- Current use: live event venue
- Public transit: 1, 2, 5, 41, 42, 43, 44, 45, 46, 102, CMAX

Construction
- Opened: March 17, 1928

Website
- www.capa.com
- Ohio Theatre
- U.S. National Register of Historic Places
- U.S. National Historic Landmark
- Interactive map of Ohio Theatre
- Coordinates: 39°57′36″N 82°59′56″W
- Architect: Thomas W. Lamb
- Architectural style: Spanish baroque
- MPS: Columbus MRA
- NRHP reference No.: 73001437

Significant dates
- Added to NRHP: May 5, 1977
- Designated NHL: May 5, 1977

The Ohio Theatre is a performing arts center and former movie palace on Capitol Square in Downtown Columbus, Ohio. Known as the "Official Theatre of the State of Ohio", the 1928 building was saved from demolition in 1969 and was later completely restored. The theater was declared a National Historic Landmark in 1977.

The Ohio Theatre is owned and operated by the Columbus Association for the Performing Arts, a non-profit arts management organization which was originally formed to save the theater in 1969.

== History ==
=== Loew's Ohio ===
Located in Downtown Columbus on the site of the old Columbus City Hall, the Ohio Theatre was designed by the noted theater architect Thomas W. Lamb. Of all of the theaters he designed, he noted the Ohio as one of his most successful. He intended to separate patrons from their daily lives by creating a luxurious fantasy atmosphere inside. It was decorated and furnished by New York designer Anne Dornin. Each room had a theme. Dornin's favorite was the "Africa Corner" which she decorated with authentic pieces from her travels. The theater also featured lavish men's and women's lounge areas including separate smoking and telephone rooms.

Built by the Loew's theater chain in partnership with United Artists the 2,779 (originally 3,096) seat Spanish Baroque movie palace opened on March 17, 1928. The first film shown was The Divine Woman, a silent film with Greta Garbo. The Ohio featured its own orchestra and Robert-Morton theater organ (still in use today). In addition to movies, deluxe variety shows graced the stage, with performers that included Fred Waring, Milton Berle, Ray Bolger, Buddy Ebsen, Ginger Rogers, Conrad Nagel, and Jack Benny.

Sound films were introduced at Loew's Ohio in August 1928. The great popularity of "talking pictures" reduced the need for theater chains to offer expensive live entertainment along with the films. Regular stage shows were discontinued in 1933 and the orchestra was disbanded. However organist Roger Garrett continued to perform daily at the "Mighty Morton" and occasional live appearances by stars including Judy Garland and Jean Harlow were featured on the stage. The theater was the premiere area showcase for the films of MGM and other studios and in the late 1930s double features became the norm. Programs ran for one week with the rare exception of huge hits like Gone with the Wind, which ran for three.

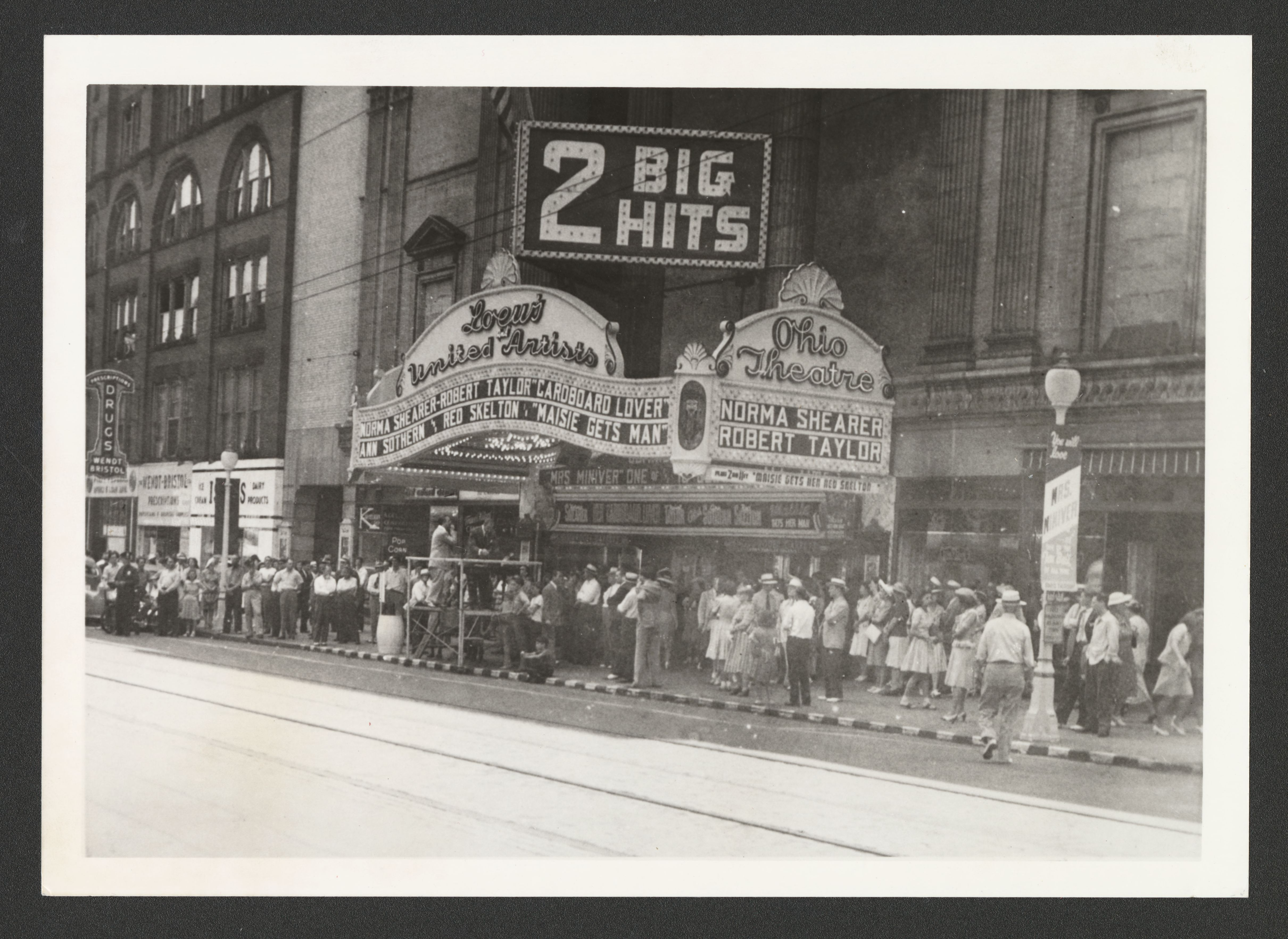
Loew's Ohio Theatre marquee, seen in 1942.

During World War II, movie theaters were busier than ever and the Ohio was no exception, adding late night showings for war plant shift workers. War bonds were heavily promoted and sold in the theater's lobby. In 1944, when Roger Garrett was inducted into the army, live organ music was discontinued.

In the late 1940s when television became popular, movie attendance gradually dropped as audiences lost the weekly moviegoing habit. Attendance further decreased when residents began moving from the city to the suburbs. The decreased profits led to a decreased staff and roped off seating. However the Ohio continued showing premium films until it closed. The James Bond films were especially popular for the theater in the 1960s. In 1966, members of the American Theatre Organ Society began restoring the Robert Morton and playing the organ for shows again.

=== Restoration and rebirth ===
Loew's closed the theater on February 24, 1969; the final film was Play Dirty, starring Michael Caine. A local development company called the 55 East State Company bought the property with plans to construct an office tower on the site of the Ohio and the adjacent Grand Theatre. Members of the community rallied to raise money to purchase an option to acquire the structure to gain time to raise additional funds and keep the theater open. Some of the non-essential interior items were sold to raise money to buy the property. Under the leadership of architect Robert Karlsberger and others, the non-profit Columbus Association for the Performing Arts (CAPA) was formed to raise money and develop a plan for the future of the theater. All the while live performances were held inside to raise money and give the public a chance to see the theater in use.

CAPA was able to use the groundswell of popular interest in the theater to convince business and government leaders to support saving the theater. In late 1969 money was raised to purchase the Ohio and it immediately began presenting shows and concerts under the management of CAPA. These concerts included rock musicians like The Grateful Dead, Frank Zappa, and Alice Cooper. The Columbus Symphony Orchestra badly needed a permanent home and began performing at the Ohio in the fall of 1969, enjoying an increase in ticket sales thanks to excitement about the new venue.

The building was completely restored to its original appearance in stages throughout the 1970s. The adjacent Grand Theatre was demolished and its lot was developed at first for parking. In 1984, the space was used to build an addition to the theater, the Galbreath Pavilion, named for real estate developer John W. Galbreath and his wife Dorothy. The pavilion expanded lobby space and added offices and rehearsal rooms. The stage was gradually modernized to allow for large theatrical performances by adding a crossover passage, supplemental dressing rooms and an expanded orchestra pit. In the 1980s as the surrounding area was cleared for development of an urban shopping mall, CAPA obtained the rights to expand the stage, doubling its size, into the alleyway behind the theater. The theater has also added dressing rooms and a loading dock to allow the Ohio to present large touring Broadway musicals.

The Ohio Theatre was one of the earliest restorations of a movie palace for use as a performing arts center and served as a model for many later historic renovation projects in the United States. Unlike many remaining 1920s theaters designed by Lamb and others, the Ohio still very closely resembles its original appearance with few alterations. Today it is the home of the Columbus Symphony Orchestra, BalletMet, the Broadway Series, Opera Columbus, and the CAPA Summer Movie Series.

== Gallery ==
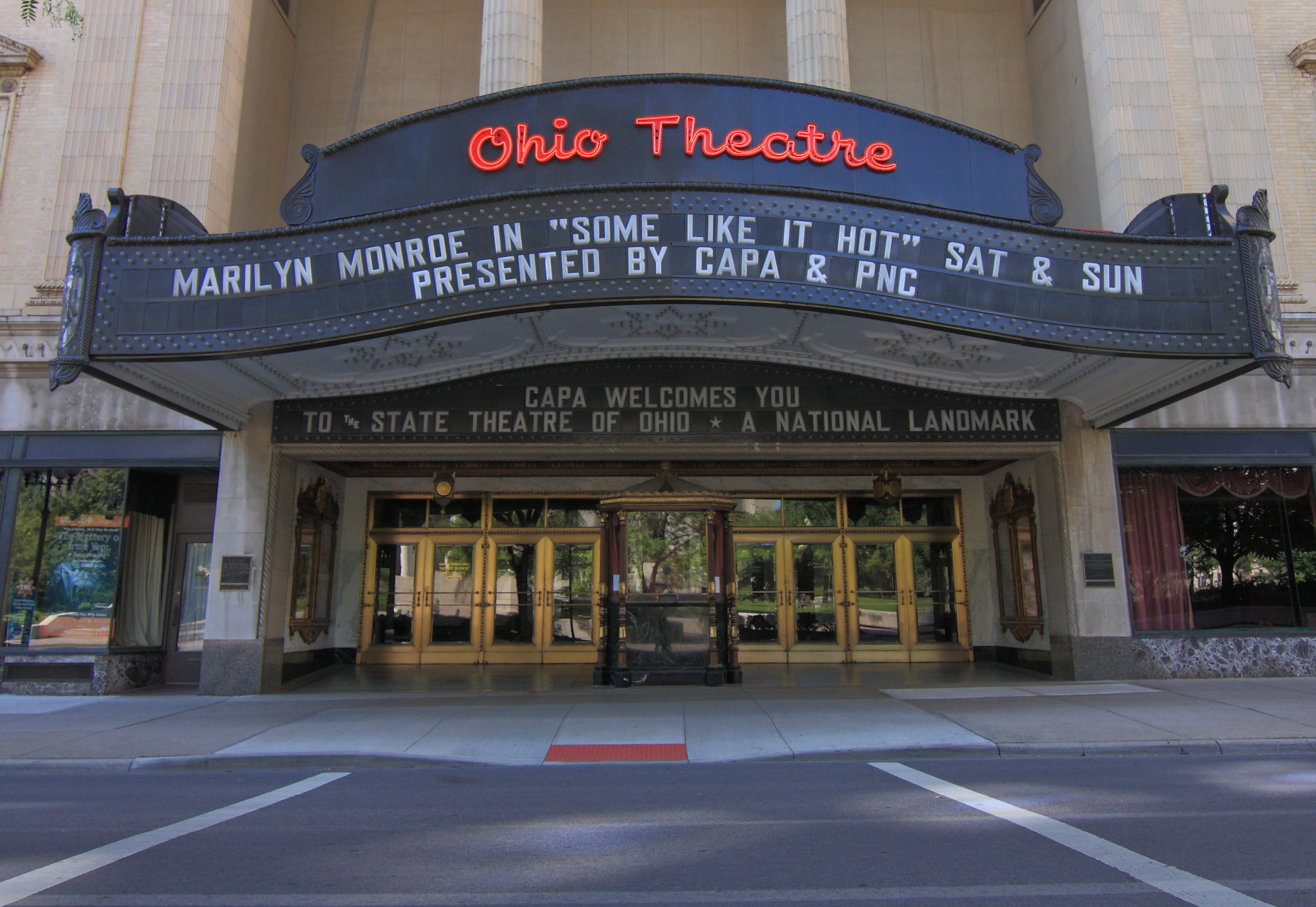
Entrance and marquee

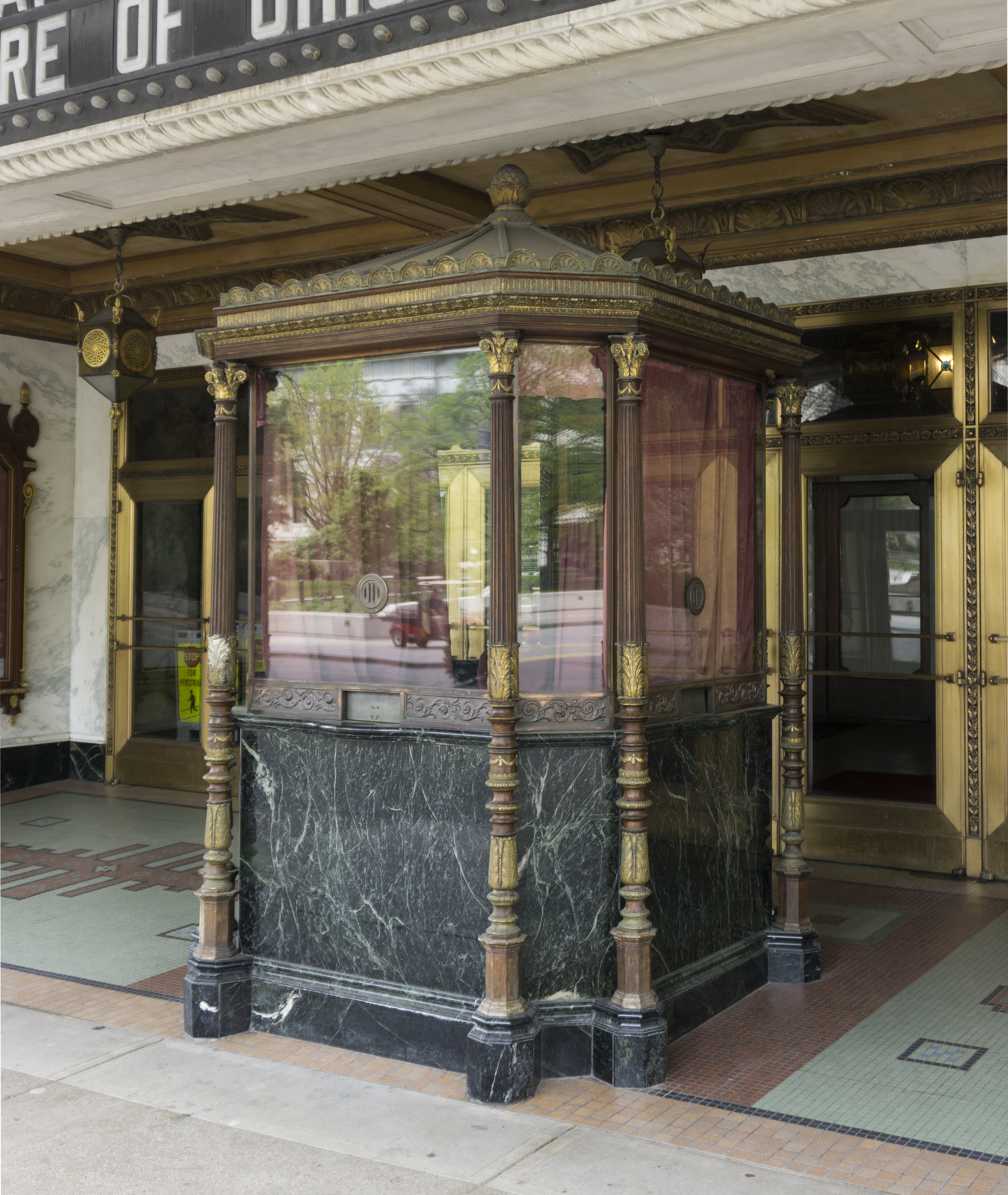
Box office

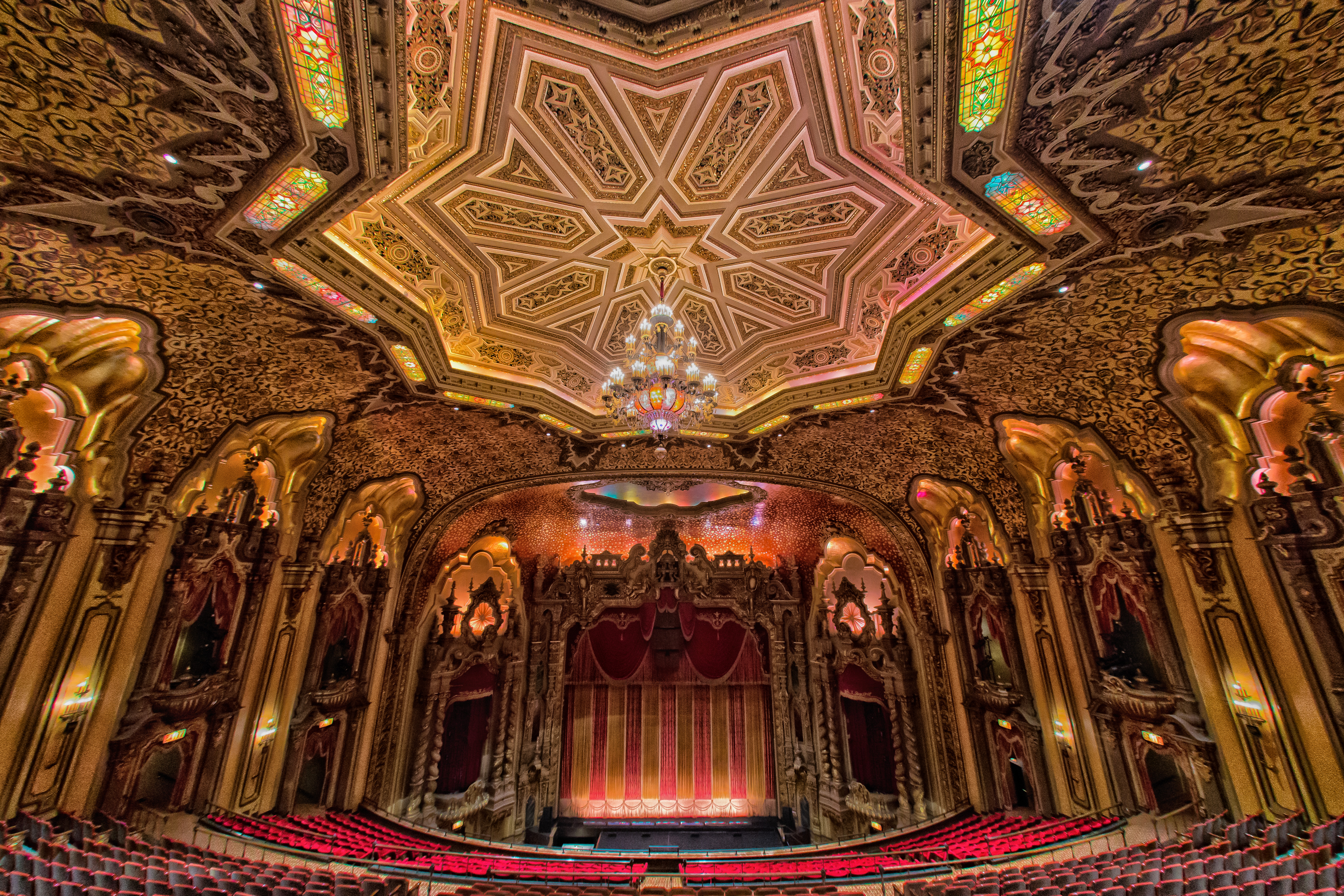
Auditorium

Entrance hall

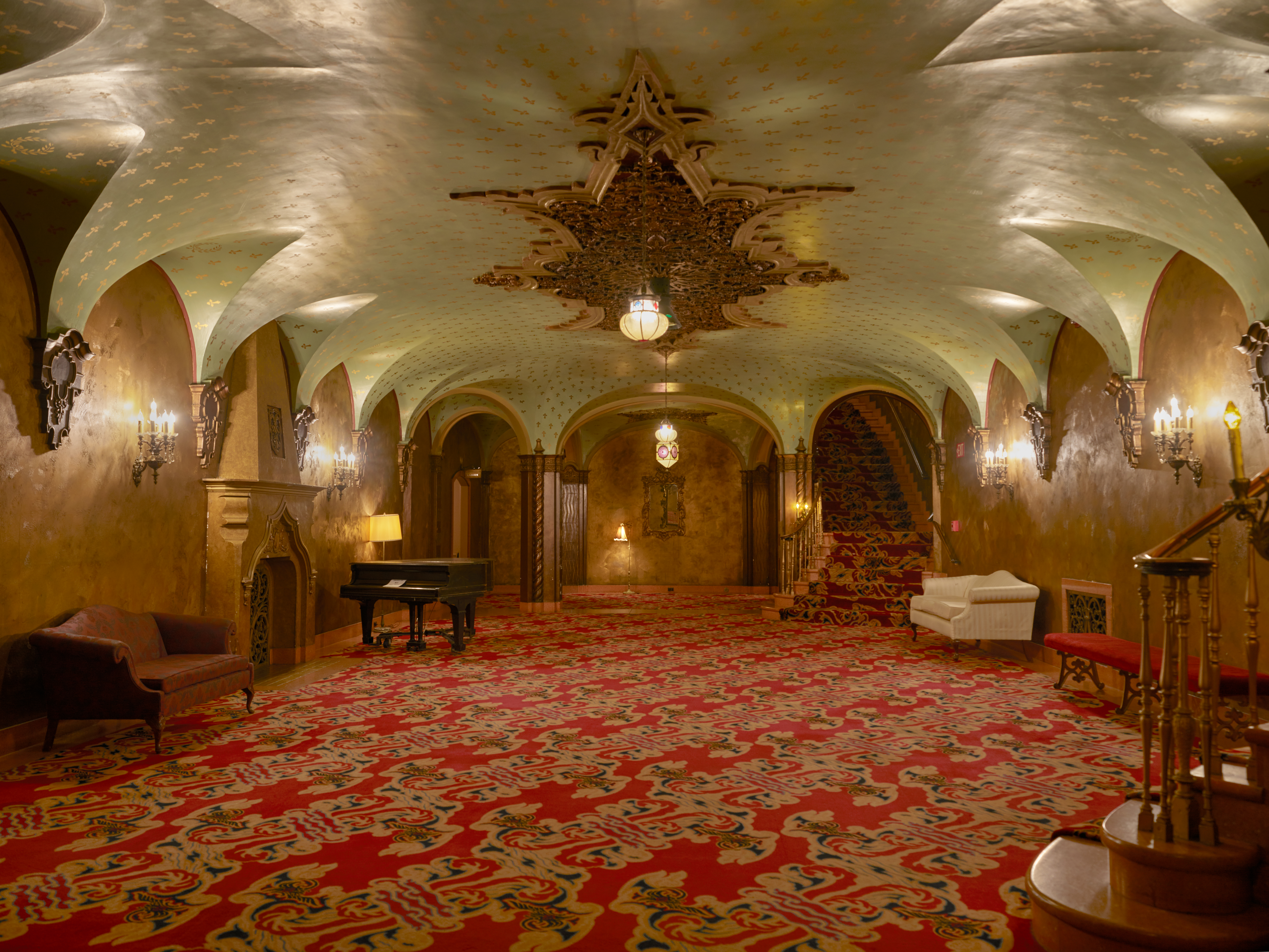
Basement level

== See also ==
- List of concert halls
- List of National Historic Landmarks in Ohio
