= High Street (Columbus, Ohio) =

North-south street in Columbus, Ohio

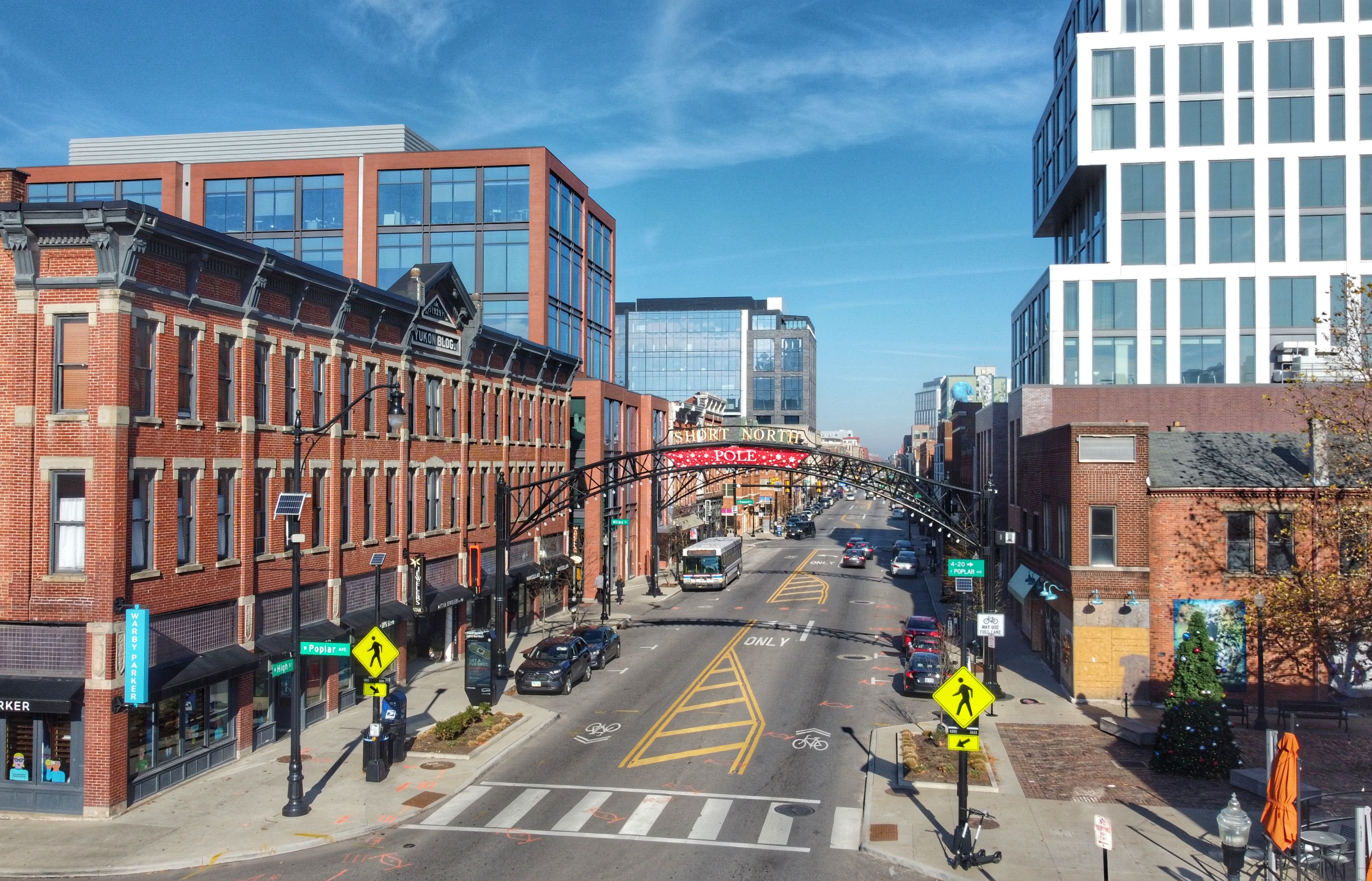
- High Street in the Short North looking north
- Location: Delaware and Franklin counties, Ohio
- North end: Columbus (northern boundary)
- South end: Hamilton Township
- East: 3rd Street
- West: Wall or Front Street

High Street is a major thoroughfare in Central Ohio, predominantly in Franklin County and Columbus. It stretches from the northern border of Columbus in Delaware County south to the southern boundary of Franklin County just past Columbus's municipal boundaries. The street is considered one of Columbus's two main roads, along with Broad Street.

== Route description ==
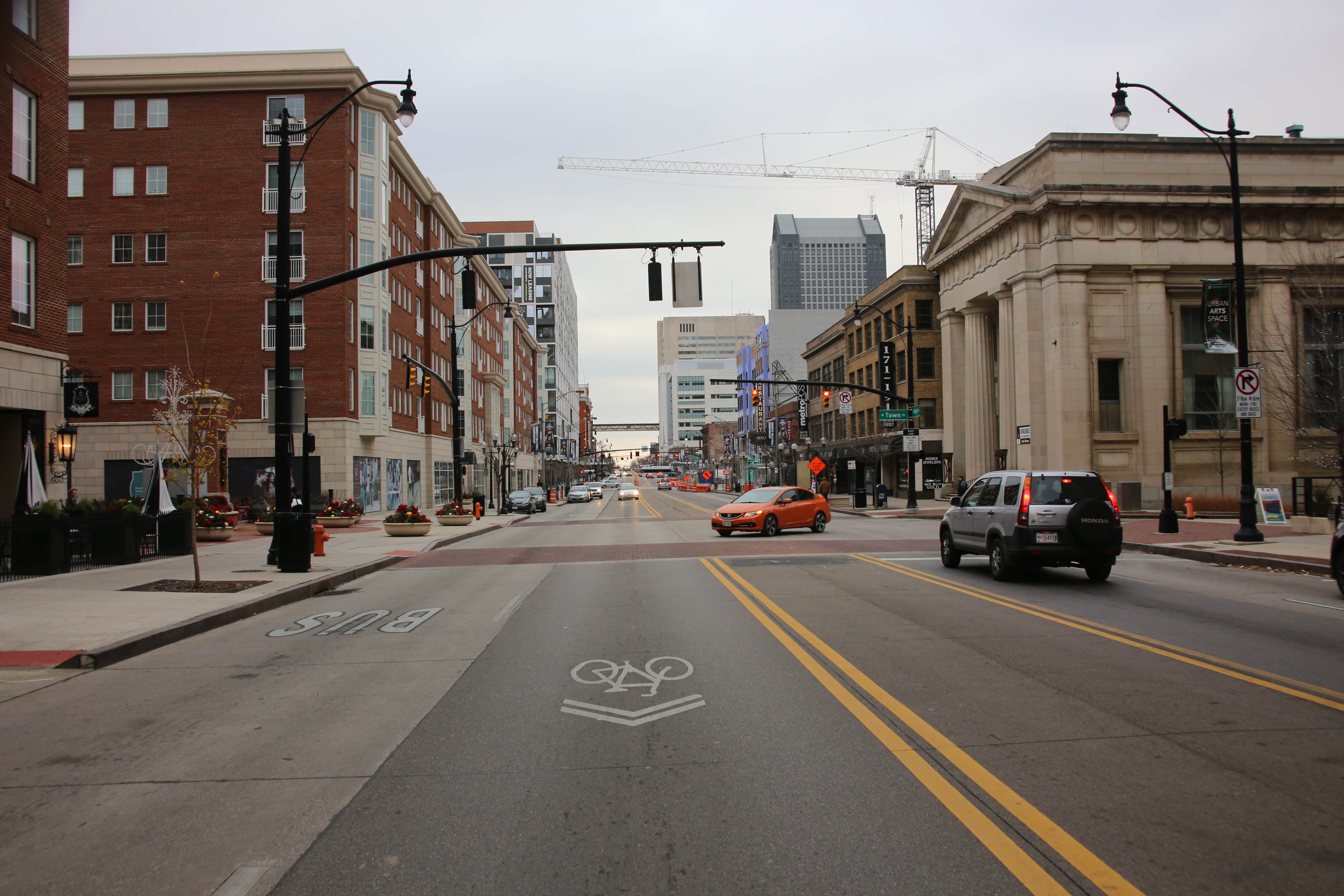
High St. south from Town St., in Downtown Columbus, Ohio

High St. south from State St., c. 1909-1910

High Street extends north and south far into Ohio, though it is named High Street starting at the northern end of Columbus (in Delaware County). North of this it is U.S. Route 23. Continuing south, the road quickly enters Franklin County and passes through some northerly suburbs in Columbus. The road enters Worthington and Riverlea, two municipalities that are enclaves of Columbus. The street is the primary corridor of Worthington's central business district. High Street resumes in Columbus, going through its Clintonville neighborhood. There it adjusts from running approximately due south to slightly southeast. It continues through Old North Columbus and then the University District, where it also passes by the Ohio State University. Immediately afterward, it enters the Short North Arts District, a historic and shopping district centered around High Street. The road continues into Downtown Columbus. There, the street enters Capitol Square, intersecting with Broad Street, the other main artery of the city.

The square is the cultural center of downtown, and includes the Ohio Statehouse, the state capitol building. High Street continues south out of Downtown through the Brewery District by German Village, and readjusts more south upon entering Merion Village. It continues through a large stretch of the city's South Side, where it terminates just south of the city borders in Hamilton Township, continuing on as U.S. Route 23.

== History ==
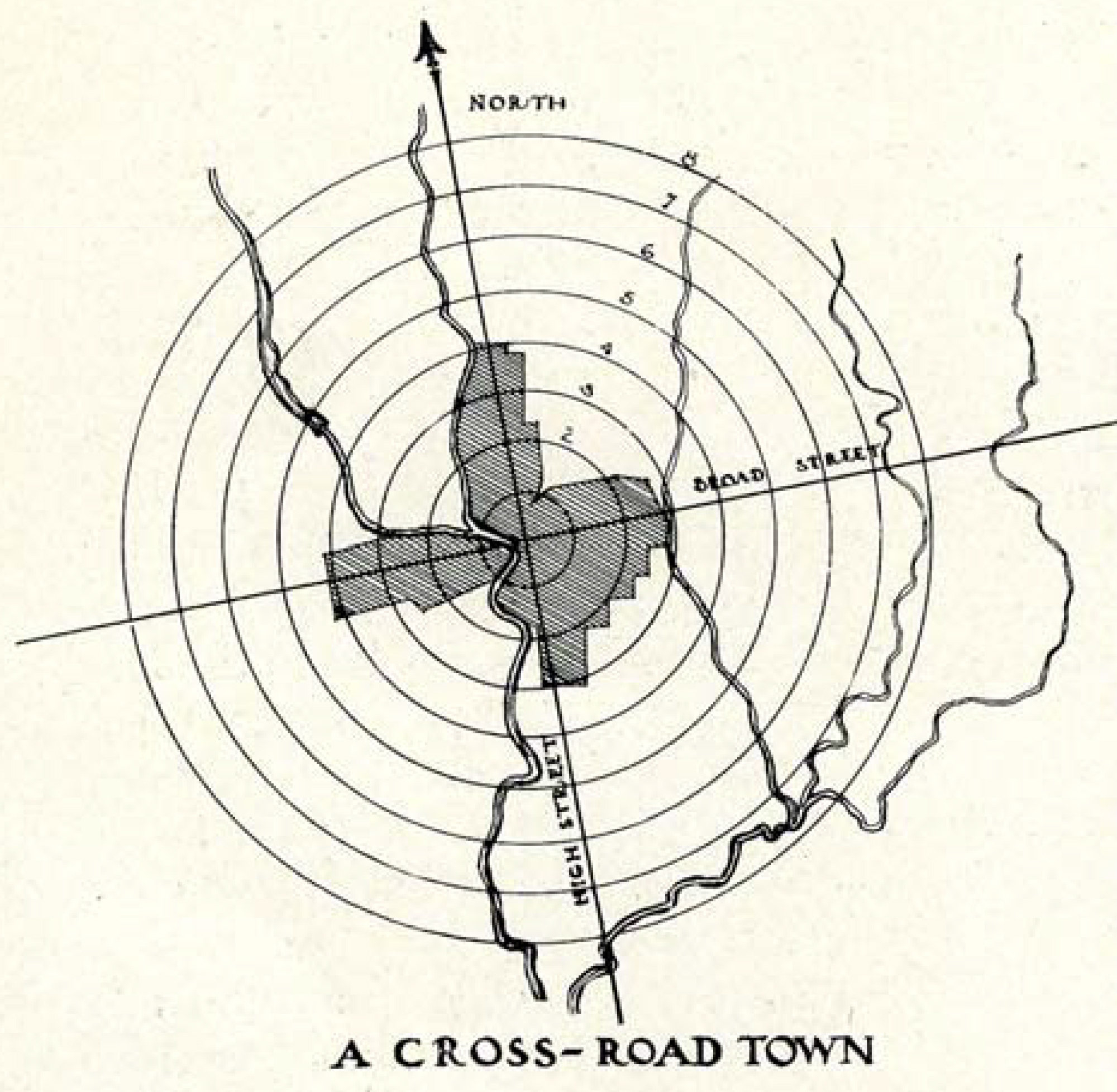
High Street, running roughly north to south, has always been one of the city's main thoroughfares; the other, Broad Street, runs roughly east to west.

High Street has been one of Columbus's two main corridors since its founding, along with Broad Street, meeting at a 100 percent corner downtown. The street (among other main corridors) was laid out from the city's founding in 1812 into the following year. These streets and the entire grid were laid out 12 degrees off from a north–south and east–west alignment.

High Street is likely named for the high ridge along which it was laid out.

== Attributes ==
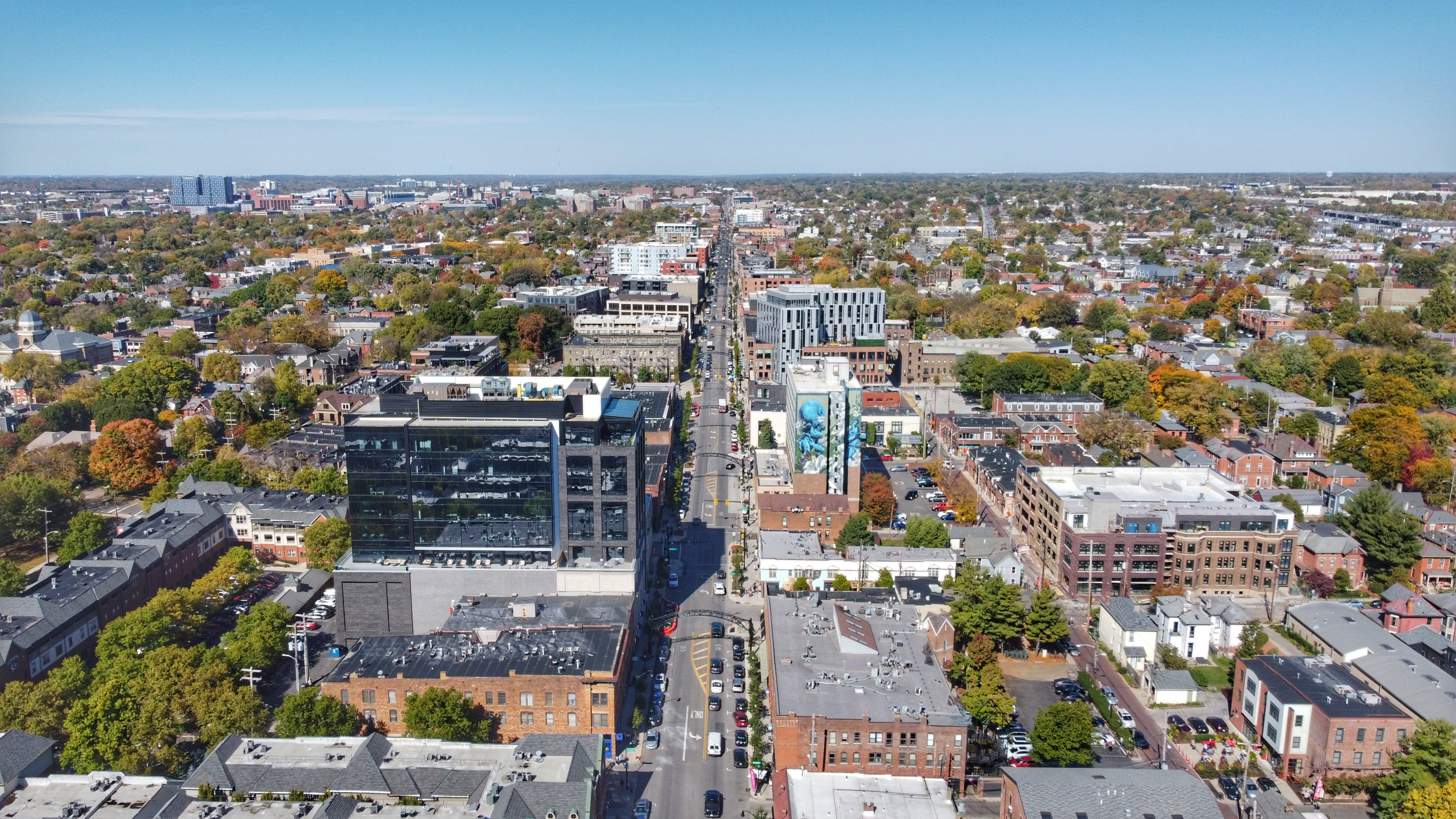
Aerial view of High Street in the Short North Historic District

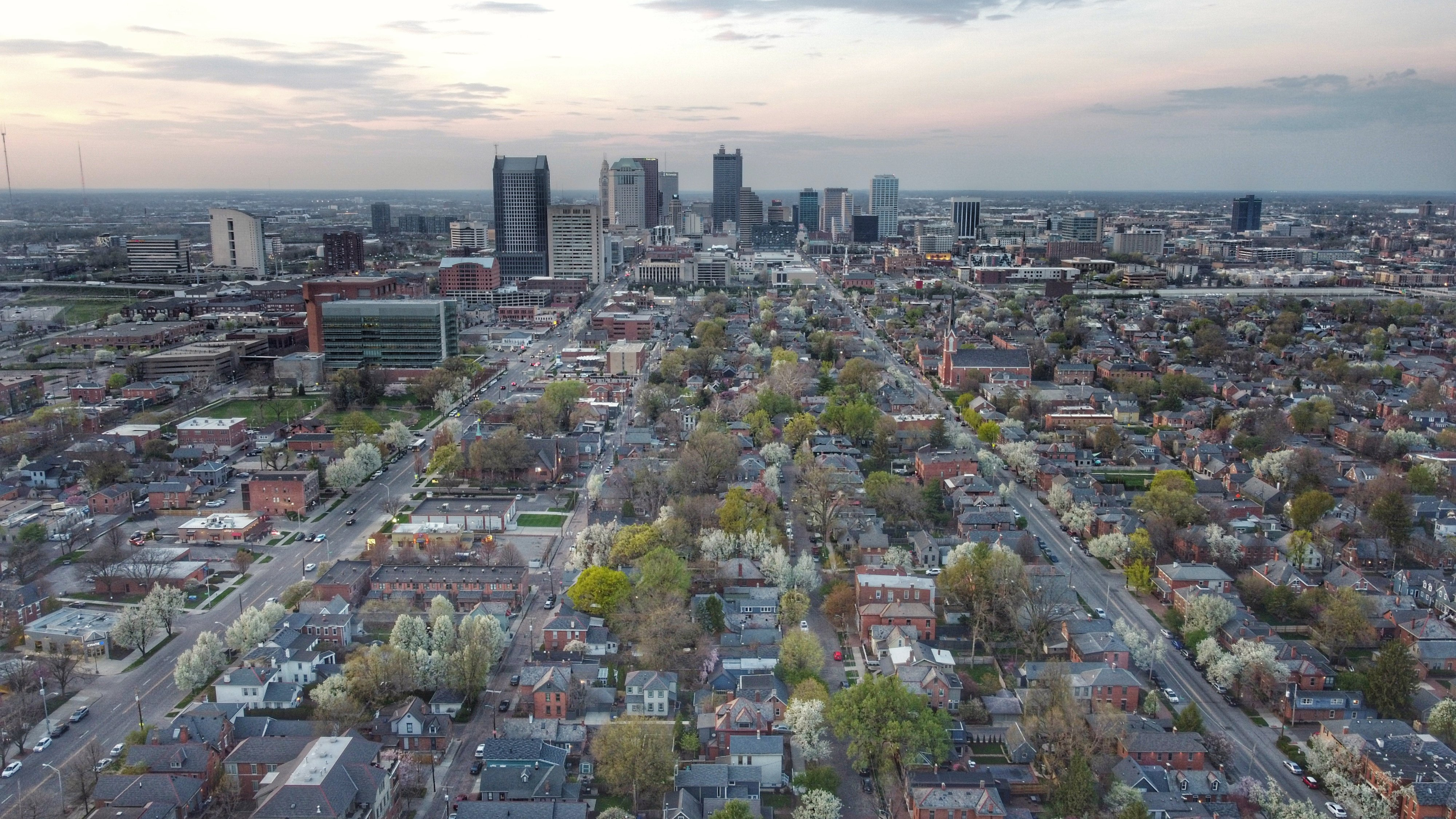
High (left) and Third (right) Sts, are the main thoroughfares into the German Village and the Brewery District

Broad Street and High Street both traverse beyond the extent of the city; High Street is the longest in Columbus, running 13.5 mi (21.7 km) (23.4 across the county), while Broad Street is longer across the county, at 25.1 mi (40.4 km). The city's street plan follows a grid pattern with the intersection of Broad and High Streets at its center. The address system begins its numbering at the intersection of Broad and High, with numbers increasing in magnitude with distance from Broad or High, as well as cardinal directions used alongside street names.

The street has a relatively broad width; it was originally laid out to be 100 ft (30 m) wide. Only Broad Street was wider, at 120 feet, while most others were 82.5 feet, and alleys were 33 feet wide.

For public transportation, numerous Central Ohio Transit Authority (COTA) routes utilize High Street. Routes 2 E Main / N High and 102, and the Night Owl run on a long extent of the street; the 102 is a limited-stop service, while the Night Owl provides late-night service.

Beside the historic landmarks listed below, the street has numerous cultural landmarks and attractions. These include Highbanks Metro Park, the Pontifical College Josephinum, the Newport Music Hall, the Ohio State University, the university's Billy Ireland Cartoon Library & Museum, the Greater Columbus Convention Center, the Lazarus Building, and the Franklin County Government Center.

== Historical landmarks ==
Buildings on High Street can have one of several types of official landmark designations:

- The Columbus Register of Historic Properties (CRHP) is the city-wide historic register. The city's Historic Resources Commission and Historic Preservation Office are responsible for identifying and designating its landmarks and the buildings in the city's historic districts.
- The National Register of Historic Places (NRHP) is the United States federal government's official list of districts, sites, buildings, structures and objects deemed worthy of preservation for their historical significance.
- The National Historic Landmark (NHL) program focuses on places of significance in American history, architecture, engineering, or culture; all NHL sites are also on the NRHP.

=== Individual landmarks ===
Below is a list of historic sites on High Street, from north to south. Historic districts are not included in this table, but are mentioned in § Historic districts. Buildings within historic districts, but no individual landmark designation, are not included in this table.

Name	Image	Address	City or neighborhood	CRHP	NRHP	Notes
Orange Johnson House Museum		956 High Street	Worthington		Yes	
Worthington Presbyterian Church		773 High Street	Worthington		Yes	
Demas Adams House		721 High Street	Worthington		Yes	
St. John's Episcopal Church		700 High Street	Worthington		Yes	
Kilbourn Commercial Building		679-681 High Street	Worthington		Yes	
Hotel Central		649 High Street	Worthington		Yes	
New England Lodge		634 High Street	Worthington		Yes	
Doctor Longenecker Office Building		633-635 High Street	Worthington		Yes	
Ripley House		623 High Street	Worthington		Yes	
Mark Russell House		5751 N. High Street	Riverlea		Yes	
Northmoor Engine House / Station #19		3601 N. High Street	Northmoor (Clintonville)	Yes		
White Castle Restaurant		2725 N. High Street	University District	Yes		
1379 N. High Street Apartment Building		1379 N. High Street	University District	Yes		
York Lodge No. 563		1276 N. High Street	University District		Yes	
Union Station arcade		370-400 N. High Street	Downtown		Yes	Demolished in 1976, delisted in 1999
Columbia Larrimer Building		161-167 N. High Street	Downtown	Yes	Yes	
Atlas Building		8 E. Long Street	Downtown		Yes	
Citizens Savings & Trust Company		51 N. High Street	Downtown	Yes		Also part of a national historic district
Ohio Statehouse		1 Capitol Square	Downtown	Yes	Yes	Also a National Historic Landmark
Ohio National Bank		167 S. High Street	Downtown		Yes	
Great Southern Hotel and Theatre		310 S. High Street	Downtown	Yes	Yes	Also part of a city and national historic district
Schlee-Kemmler Building		326 S. High Street	Downtown	Yes	Yes	Also part of a city and national historic district
Krumm Residence		975-979 S. High Street	Brewery District	Yes	Yes	
Dan's Drive-In		1881 S. High Street	Merion Village	Yes		
Saint Joseph Cemetery		6440 S. High Street	Lockbourne			

=== Historic districts ===
There are numerous historic districts through which High Street passes. Buildings in these districts with individual landmark designations are described in § Individual landmarks. From north to south, the districts are:

- Worthington Historic District, a national historic district
- Old Beechwold, a city and national historic district
- North Columbus Commercial Historic District, a national historic district
- Northwood Park, a city historic district
- Near Northside Historic District, a national historic district (overlaps with Victorian Village)
- Victorian Village, a city historic district
  - Fifth Avenue and North High Historic District, a national historic district (mostly within Victorian Village)
- Italian Village, a city historic district
  - Old North End Historic District, a national historic district
  - Third Avenue and North High Historic District, a national historic district (mostly within Italian Village)
- Short North Historic District, a national historic district
- North Market Historic District, a city and national historic district
- High and Gay Streets Historic District, a national historic district
- South High Commercial Historic District, a city and national historic district
- Brewery District, a city historic district (German Village is one block over)
  - Schlee Brewery Historic District, a national historic district
- Hartman Stock Farm Historic District, a national historic district

== See also ==
- Geography of Columbus, Ohio
