= Old North End Historic District =

Old North End Historic District may refer to:

- Old North End Historic District (Colorado Springs, Colorado)
- Old North End Historic District (Columbus, Ohio)
