= Saint Joseph Cemetery (Lockbourne, Ohio) =

Catholic cemetery in Lockbourne, Ohio, US

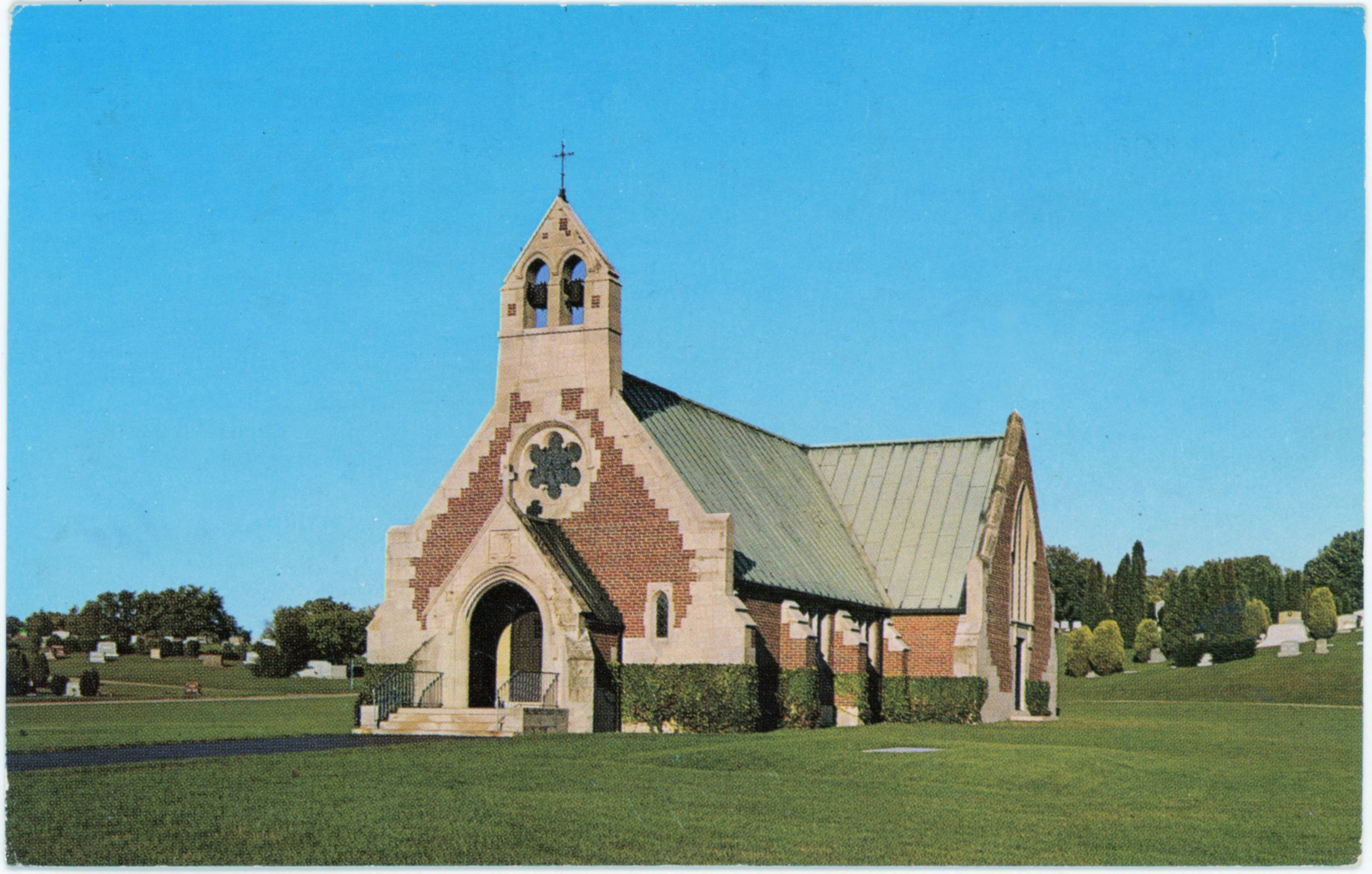
- Our Mother of Sorrows Chapel at St. Joseph Cemetery
- Interactive map of Saint Joseph Cemetery

Details
- Established: 2 November 1913
- Location: 6440 High Street; Lockbourne, Ohio, 43137
- Coordinates: 39°49′42″N 82°59′57″W
- Type: Catholic
- Owned by: Roman Catholic Diocese of Columbus
- Size: 755 acres (306 ha)
- No. of interments: 57,000
- Website: https://www.catholiccemeteriesofcolumbus.org/cemeteries/st-joseph-cemetery
- Find a Grave: Saint Joseph Cemetery

Saint Joseph Cemetery is a Catholic cemetery owned and operated by the Diocese of Columbus located in Lockbourne, Ohio. The original 194-acre property was purchased in 1907 under the direction of Bishop James Hartley, and subsequent purchases expanded its size to its current 755 acres. Hartley blessed the cemetery on All Souls' Day of 1913 and the first interment was made in the same month. In 1929, the English Gothic Our Mother of Sorrows Chapel was completed on the property. The chapel would serve as a parish church from 1947 to 1970, and the property also hosted a summer camp, Camp Saint Joseph, from 1926 to 1970. It is the largest of the four cemeteries administered by the Diocese of Columbus.

== History ==
=== Founding ===
In July 1907, Bishop Hartley purchased 194 acres four miles south of the city of Columbus, adjoining the Hartman Stock Farm, to be used as a new Catholic cemetery, supplementing the existing burial ground of Mount Calvary in downtown Columbus, which had been established in 1865. On November 2, 1913, All Souls' Day, Bishop Hartley blessed the ground of the cemetery, citing overcrowding at Mt. Calvary in his sermon at the consecration. In the time between the purchase of the original land and the blessing of the graveyard, 30 more acres were acquired, and $42,000 spent on improvements to the land, including a house for the sexton, the paving of five miles of roadway, and the removal of trees and shrubbery. The consecration procession for the property was led by Fr. John O'Neil, who is the only burial in the Mother of Sorrow's twelve crypt vaults.

=== Camp St. Joseph ===
In May 1926, the Diocese began raising funds for the construction of a summer camp for boys on 55 acres on the eastern portion of the cemetery property, at the banks of Big Walnut Creek. The property was dedicated on July 4, 1926, and served 200 campers between the ages of 10 and 16 in its first summer of operation. Sunday Mass was celebrated in the dining hall of the camp until the construction of Our Mother of Sorrows Chapel. The Knights of Columbus assisted in operating the camp until 1937. Due to financial issues, the Columbus Diocese discontinued summer camp operations at St. Joseph in 1971. The site remained open for group rentals into the next decade.

=== Our Mother of Sorrows Chapel and Parish ===
Mother of Sorrows Chapel
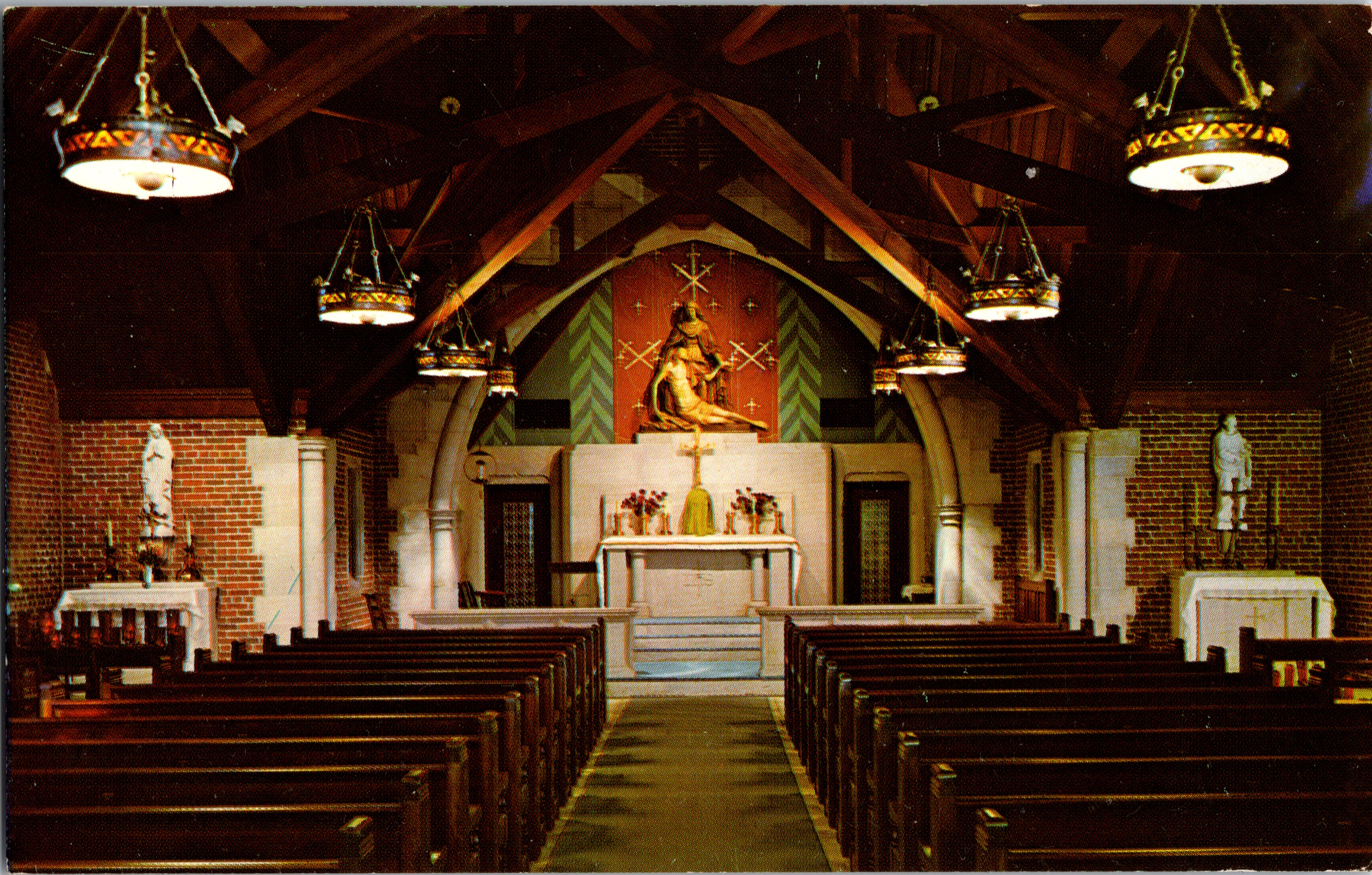
- The interior of Mother of Sorrows Chapel at St. Joseph Cemetery following the installation of a Pietà statue in 1950.
- Mother of Sorrows Chapel

Architecture
- Architect: Edward A. Ramsey
- Style: English Gothic
- Completed: 1929
- Construction cost: $35,000

Clergy
- Bishop: Earl K. Fernandes

In the spring of 1929, Hartley commissioned the building of Our Mother of Sorrows, a devotional chapel built in a cruciform English Gothic style out of red brick and Indiana limestone, with seating for 200 people. On the west gable is a stone belfry with two bronze bells, one for the Angelus and one for the De Profundis. The church was designed by Edward A. Ramsey, cost $35,000, and was completed by the fall of 1929.

Bishop Michael Ready announced in July 1947 that a parish would be formed at Mother of Sorrows chapel to serve the residents of Lockbourne and nearby Shadeville, with the first Mass being offered on July 27 to a congregation of 39. As the building had been constructed for infrequent use, it needed heating and air conditioning installed, as well as additional vestments and vessels for Mass. In 1950 a wooden figure of the Pietà was installed above the altar, and a station wagon purchased to drive the nine schoolchildren of the parish to the chapel, where a bus from St. Ladislas School would pick them up. In 1957 a new office building northwest of the church was constructed, housing office space as well as consultation rooms for families. Sunday Mass attendance peaked at 234 in 1965 and declined in the following years, and the parish was merged into St. Ladislas in 1970.

A $300,000, five-month renovation to Our Mother of Sorrows was completed in November 2022 and included the installation of LED lighting, the return of the Pieta sculpture to above the altar, refinishing pews, and roof repairs along with tuckpointing the exterior brickwork. The chapel hosted approximately 60 funeral services in 2021.

== Notable interments ==
- James Joseph Hartley (d. 1944), fourth bishop of Columbus
- Michael Joseph Ready (d. 1957), fifth bishop of Columbus
- Clarence Edward Elwell (d. 1973), eighth bishop of Columbus
- Mildred Gillars (d. 1988), American Nazi propagandist convicted of treason
- Chalmers Wylie (d. 1998), Ohio politician
- George Blackburn (d. 2006), head coach of the University of Cincinnati Bearcats football team from 1955 to 1960
- Dominic Salvatore Gentile (d. 1951), American Flying ace of World War II
- Joseph Carr (d. 1939), National Football League president from 1921 to 1939
- Vic Janowicz (d. 1996), first Heisman Trophy winner to play in both the National Football League and Major League Baseball
- Bill Hinchman (d. 1963), Major League Baseball outfielder
- Ted Jordan (d. 2005), film and television actor best known for appearances on Gunsmoke from 1966 to 1975.
- Lee Magee (d. 1966), MLB player and manager
- Bob Quinn (d. 1954), MLB executive
