= Columbia Larrimer Building =

- Columbia Larimer Building
- U.S. National Register of Historic Places
- Columbus Register of Historic Properties
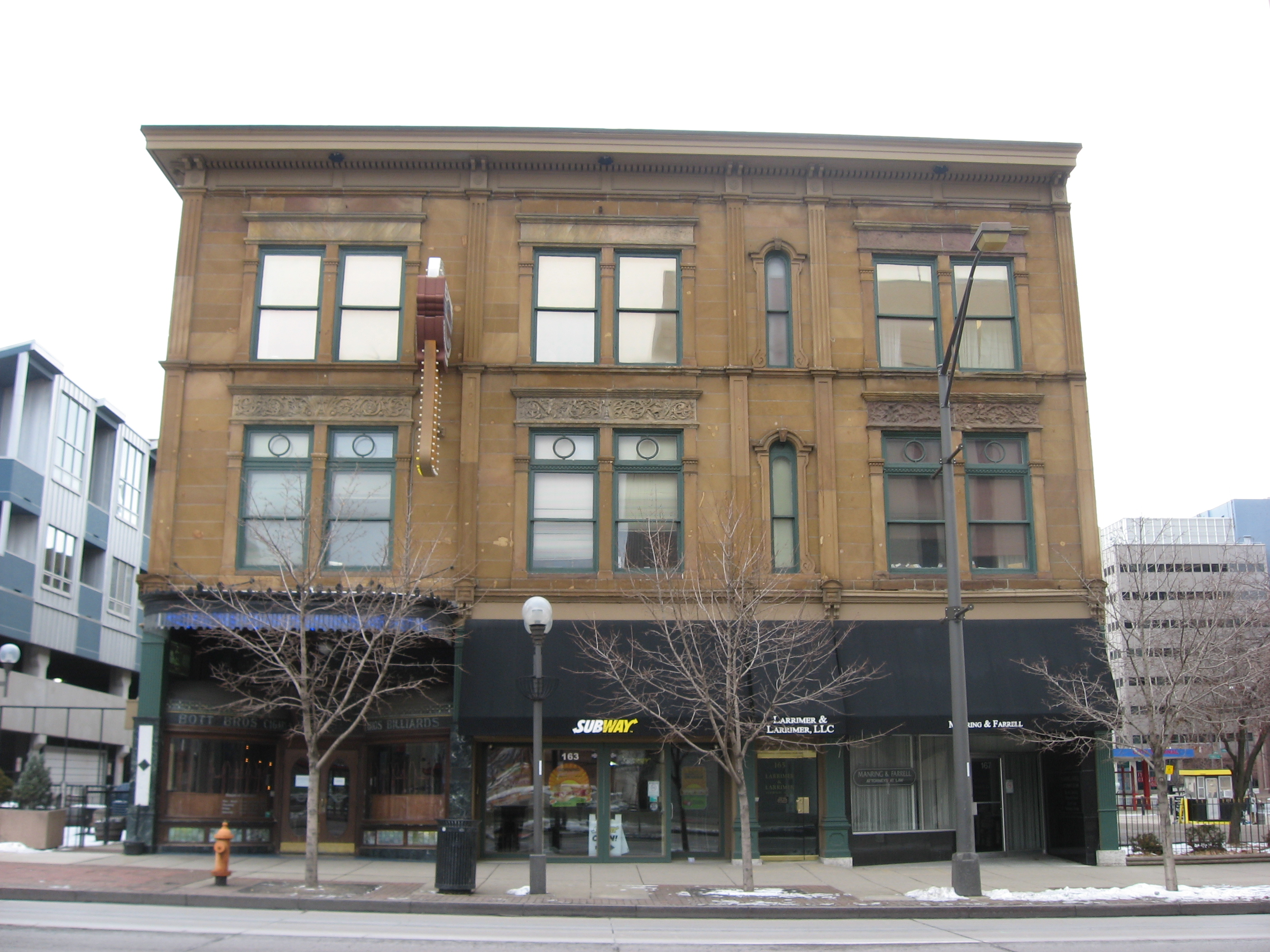
- Interactive map highlighting the building's location
- Location: 161-167 N. High Street, Columbus, Ohio
- Coordinates: 39.965702°N 83.001729°W
- Built: 1895
- Architects: Stribling & Lum
- NRHP reference No.: 83001967
- CRHP No.: CR-35

Significant dates
- Added to NRHP: August 12, 1983
- Designated CRHP: January 21, 1985

The Columbia Larrimer Building is a historic building in Downtown Columbus, Ohio. It was listed on the National Register of Historic Places in 1983. The building is significant for its storefront design and craftsmanship, along with the front interior installed by the Bott Brothers when they moved their bar there in 1905. The building was home to the Clock Restaurant in the mid-to-late 1900s, and currently Elevator Brewery & Draught Haus.

== See also ==
- National Register of Historic Places listings in Columbus, Ohio
