= Bill Hinchman =

American baseball player (1883–1963)

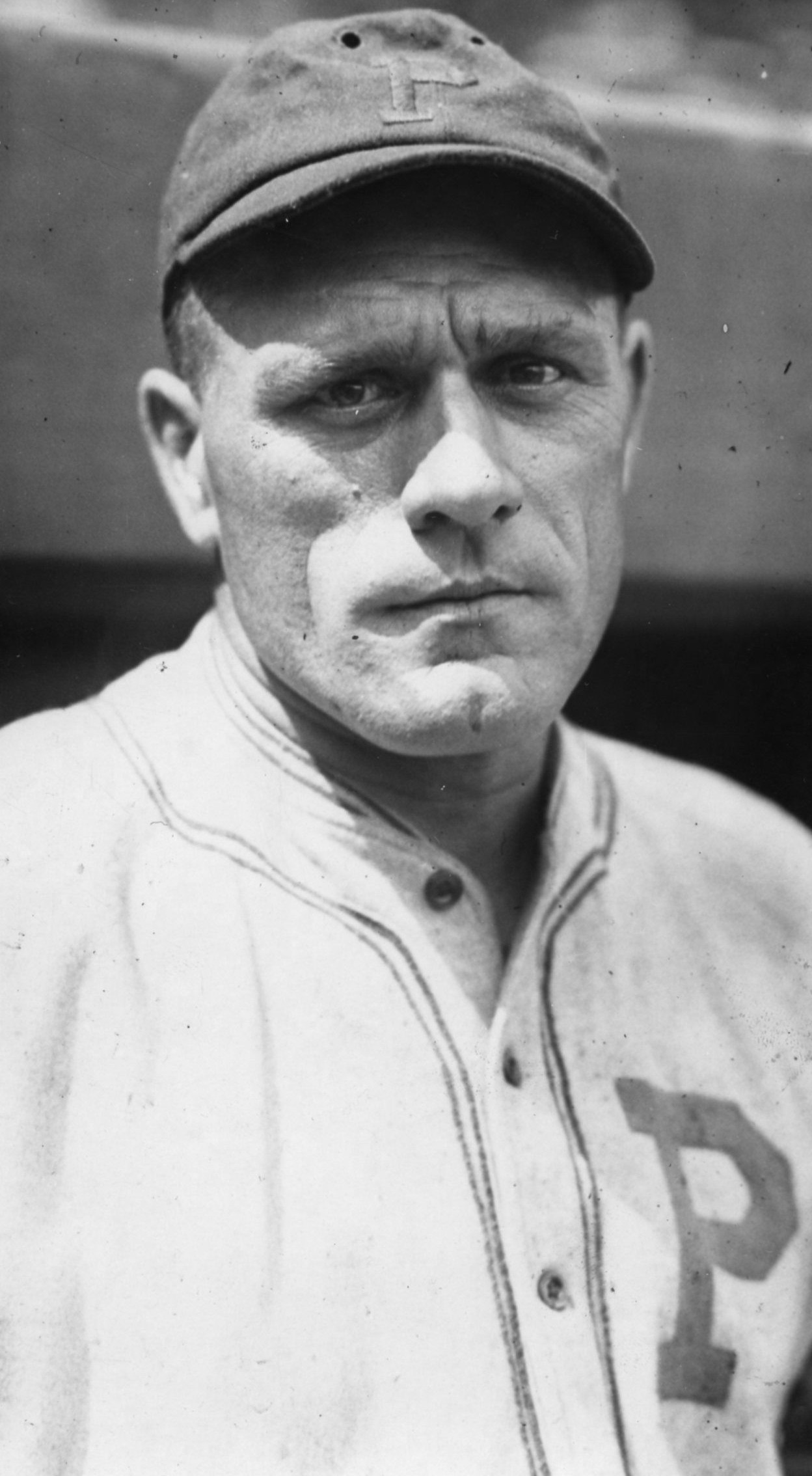
- Outfielder
- Born: April 4, 1883; Philadelphia, Pennsylvania, U.S.
- Died: February 20, 1963 (aged 79); Columbus, Ohio, U.S.
- Batted: Right Threw: Right

MLB debut
- September 24, 1905, for the Cincinnati Reds

Last MLB appearance
- June 23, 1920, for the Pittsburgh Pirates

MLB statistics
- Batting average: .261
- Home runs: 20
- Runs batted in: 369
- Stats at Baseball Reference

Teams
- Cincinnati Reds (1905–1906); Cleveland Naps (1907–1909); Pittsburgh Pirates (1915–1918, 1920)

William White Hinchman (April 4, 1883 – February 20, 1963) was an American professional baseball outfielder. He played in Major League Baseball (MLB) from 1905 to 1920 for the Cincinnati Reds, Cleveland Naps, and Pittsburgh Pirates.

== Career ==
In 1916 he led the National League in triples with 16 as a member of the Pirates.

In 908 games over 10 seasons, Hinchman posted a .261 batting average (793-for-3043) with 364 runs, 69 triples, 20 home runs and 369 RBI.

According to Harrisburg, Pennsylvania's Evening News, "A broken leg, suffered in a slide, ended his playing career in 1919."

== Death and interment ==
Hinchman died at the age of seventy-nine at a nursing home in Columbus, Ohio on February 20, 1963. He is buried at Saint Joseph Cemetery in Lockbourne, Ohio.

== See also ==
- List of Major League Baseball annual triples leaders
