= York Lodge No. 563 =

- U.S. National Register of Historic Places
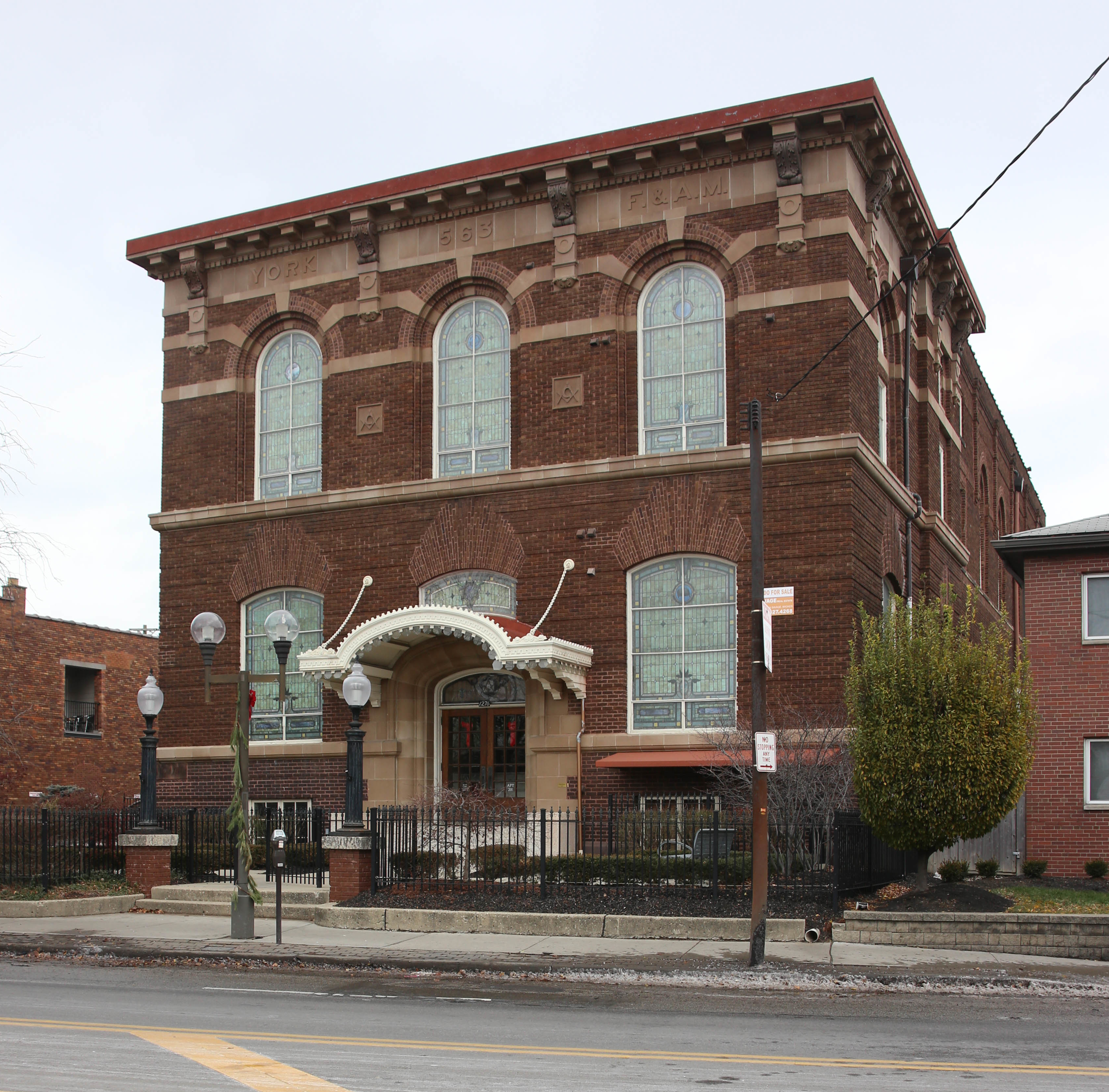
- Interactive map highlighting the building's location
- Location: 1276 N. High Street, Columbus, Ohio
- Coordinates: 39°59′18″N 83°0′19″W
- Area: Less than 1 acre (0.40 ha)
- Built: 1915
- Architect: Stribling & Lum
- Architectural style: Italian Renaissance
- NRHP reference No.: 84003691
- Added to NRHP: July 19, 1984

The York Lodge No. 563 is a historic Masonic lodge building on the northern side of Columbus, Ohio, United States. Constructed at the beginning of the twentieth century, it was home to the first Masonic lodge in its part of the city. Its architecture makes it a prominent part of the local built environment, and the building has been named a historic site.

Masons established their first Columbus presence in the downtown area, but the northern neighborhoods were harder to penetrate; multiple attempts to start a northern lodge were made, but the first efforts failed. York Lodge 563 finally broke this trend, becoming the first northern lodge to last more than a short time. When their strength had grown to the point that they could construct their own lodge building, they contracted with the architectural firm of Stribling and Lum to design the present building, which was completed in 1915.

Built of brick with elements of limestone and metal, the lodge building is typical of early twentieth-century variants of the Italianate style. Few modifications have been made to the ornamental interior, and the original stained glass windows have likewise been preserved. The most distinctive elements of the exterior are components such as cunningly-worked limestone trim and decorative brickwork. This exterior causes the building to be greatly different from its neighbors, commercial buildings with substantially smaller setbacks from the street.

In July 1984, the York Lodge No. 563 was listed on the National Register of Historic Places, qualifying because of its historically significant architecture. Critical to its historic site status was the lack of modification either inside or out, and its architect was also related to designation: although Stribling and Lum operated from 1902 until 1933, almost none of their buildings comparable to or grander than the lodge building have survived.

== See also ==
- National Register of Historic Places listings in Columbus, Ohio
