= Dan's Drive-In =

Diner in Columbus, Ohio

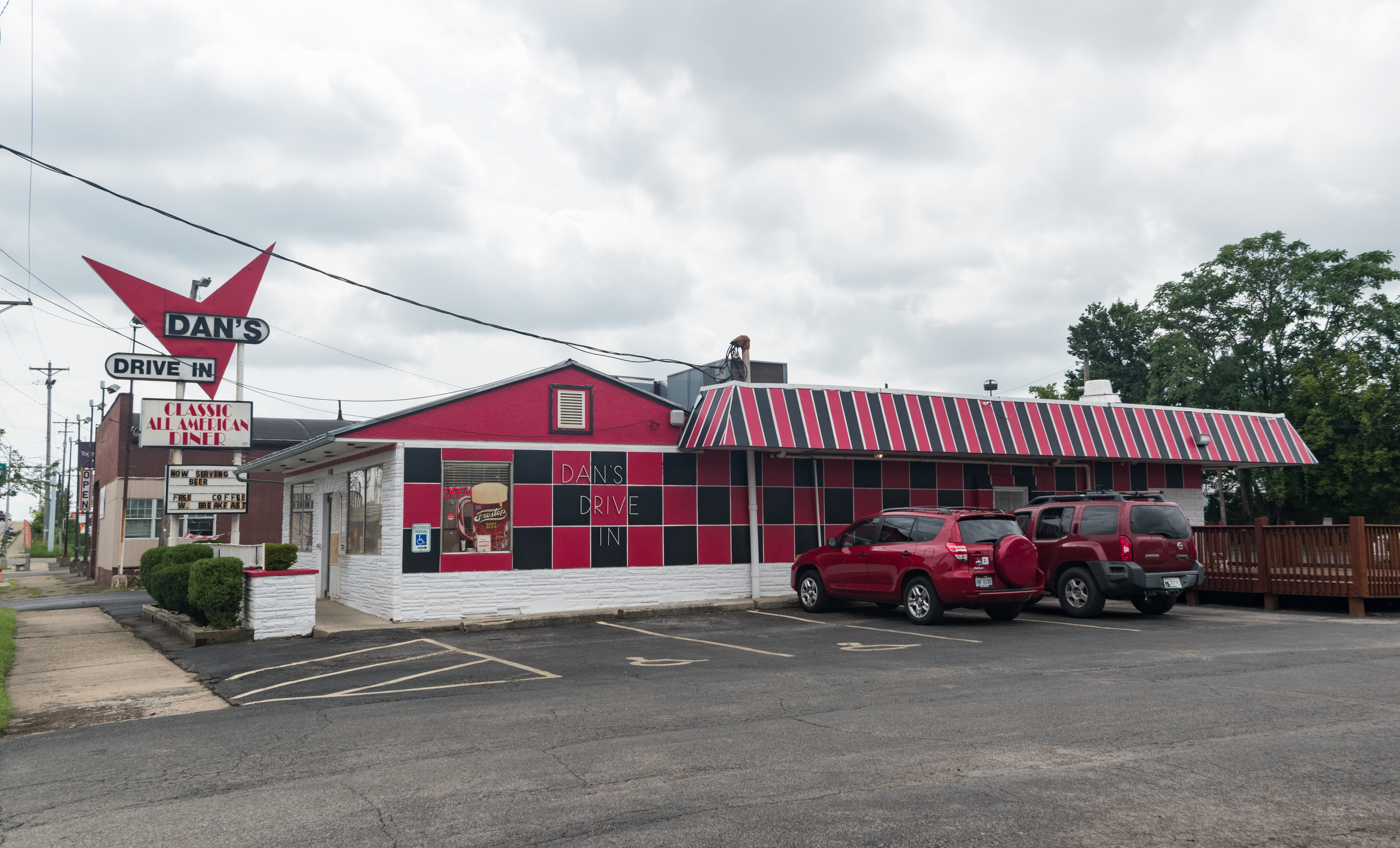
- 39.923607°N 82.995746°W
- Location: 1881 S. High Street, Columbus, Ohio

History
- Built: 1958

Site notes
- Area: .54 acres (0.22 ha)
- Architectural style: Vernacular

Columbus Register of Historic Properties
- Designated: July 9, 2018
- Reference no.: CR-75

Dan's Drive-In was a historic diner in Columbus, Ohio. The diner was built in 1958, and was added to the Columbus Register of Historic Properties in 2018. The diner was deemed significant in representing the 1950s and 1960s, through to 1969 when mom-and-pop diners began to diminish. The structure was designed in a vernacular style, utilizing concrete blocks and metal. It is an excellent example of a mid 20th century drive-through diner, and one of few mid-century diners left in Columbus.

== Attributes ==
Dan's Drive-In is located on the city's South Side, in a largely industrial area.

The restaurant has a red and black checkerboard exterior and a large distinctive sign facing High Street. The interior has red vinyl seats, Route 66 paintings, and Elvis Presley and Marilyn Monroe memorabilia.

The diner operates seven days a week until late afternoon, with plans to restore evening hours as neighborhood conditions improve. The menu has traditional diner food, a wide variety of breakfast, burgers, and Greek food options.

== History ==
Dan's Drive-In was first established in 1952, at the intersection of Mound and High streets. The current structure was built in 1958. In the 1950s and 1960s, the surrounding area had numerous industrial sites, employing thousands of people. Dan's attracted the families of these workers, as well as groups of youths. Carhops would serve car-fulls of customers, venturing between the restaurant and parking lot with burgers, french fries, and milkshakes.

A prior owner began the process to list the building on the Columbus Register of Historic Properties. When Ankit Nagi and his father purchased the building in 2017, Nagi and the Columbus Landmarks Foundation completed the process, and the diner was listed in 2018. The building is the first on the Columbus register that represents mid-20th century roadside architecture. The team is searching for photographs that will help list it on the National Register of Historic Places as well.
