= White Castle Restaurant =

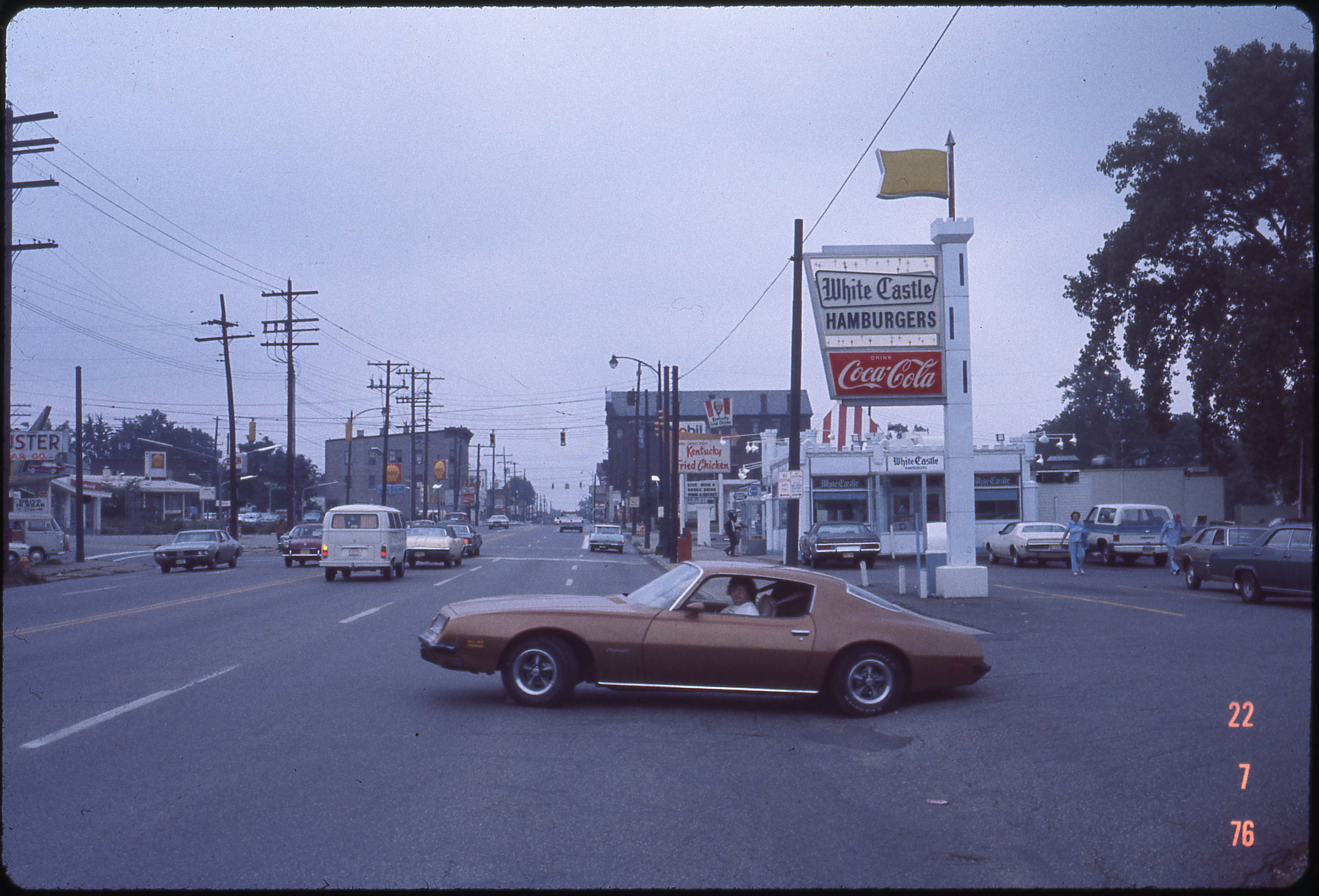
- Landmarked restaurant seen from High Street, 1976
- Original restaurant location
- 40.0179°N 83.0125°W, 39.7810°N 83.1186°W
- Location: 2725 N. High Street, Columbus, Ohio (original location); 10530 Thrailkill Rd, Orient, Ohio

History
- Built: 1951

Columbus Register of Historic Properties
- Designated: March 19, 1984
- Reference no.: CR-25

The White Castle Restaurant is a historic restaurant building, built in Columbus, Ohio by the White Castle hamburger chain. It was listed on the Columbus Register of Historic Properties in 1984. The building was moved to Orient, Ohio in 1986, replaced with a new White Castle building. In 2010, the building was again moved, this time to Rolla, Missouri.

== Attributes ==
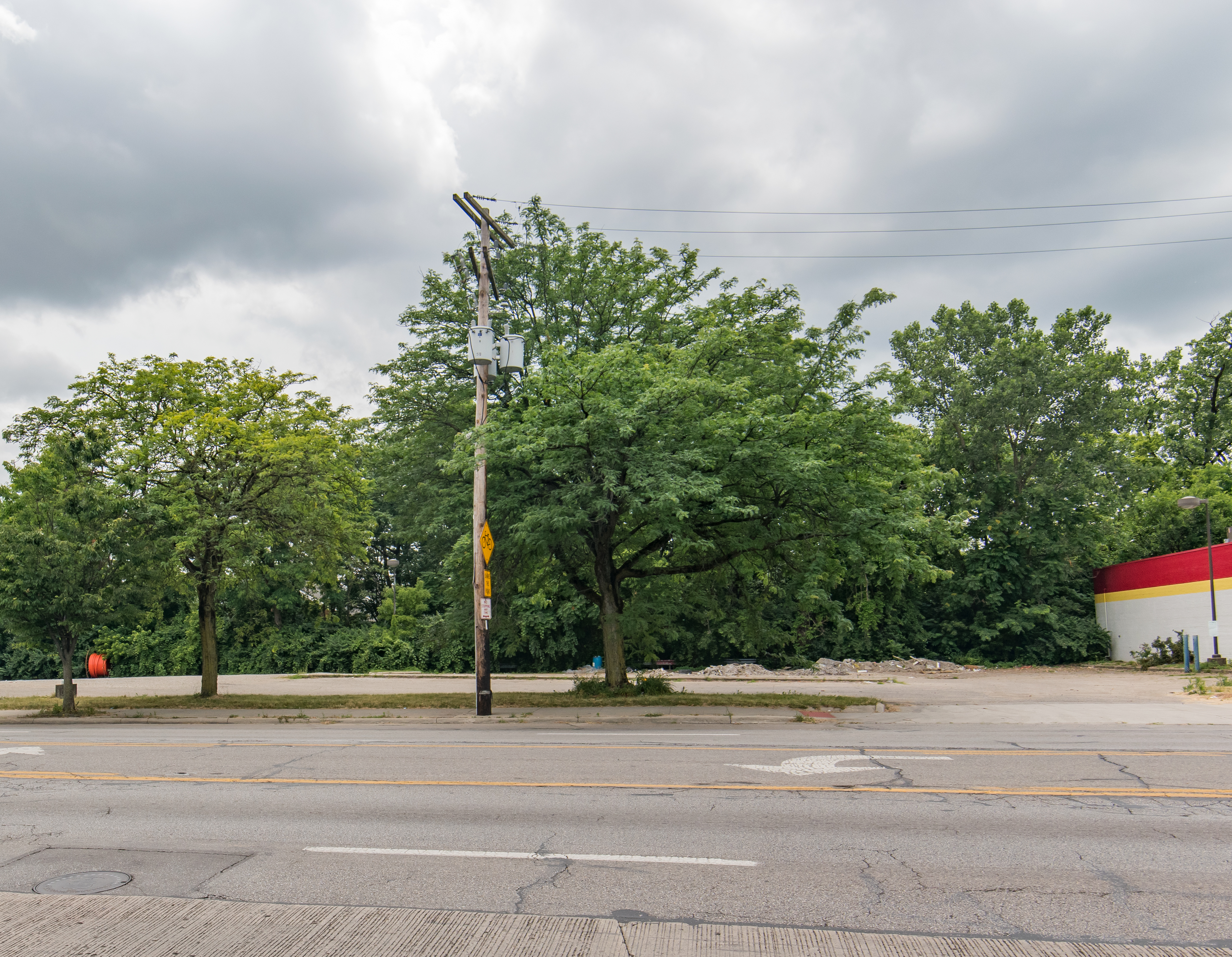
Original site empty in 2020

The restaurant, "building number 4", was located on Arcadia Avenue, situated to be near North High School. It was made of porcelain enamel steel, with stained glass windows, styled like the Chicago Water Tower. The style was created in 1935; the Arcadia Avenue building was one of the last two made with that design, and the last in Columbus with the style. Columbus streetcars were stored just south of the building.

The restaurant originally had curb service, with a window counter in its front room. The building was converted for cafeteria service in 1972: the counter, window counter, and stools were replaced with small tables, seating 20 people.

== History ==
=== 1929 building ===
The restaurant, a five-stool lunch operation, first opened in 1929, with a white enamel brick design with a tower and battlement, resembling a castle. It was one of the first six White Castle restaurants in the city.

=== 1951 building ===
The White Castle on Cleveland Avenue, co-nominated on the Columbus Register of Historic Places

The building was constructed in 1951, opening in December 1. Over its operational history, the building was struck by automobiles on four recorded occasions.

The building was listed on the Columbus Register of Historic Properties in 1984. It was nominated along with another White Castle restaurant, formerly at 1097 Cleveland Avenue in Columbus, in a group nomination. The latter restaurant was moved to a new location at the Columbus Zoo in 1984.

In March 1986, the Columbus Historic Resources Commission approved White Castle's plan to dismantle the building. A more modern building was set to be constructed behind it. Despite the approval, White Castle still supported a bid by the Columbus Landmarks Foundation to move and preserve the building, potentially to a museum in Orient, Ohio.

In May 1986, the restaurant was moved from its original property; White Castle System donated the building and shared the cost in moving it. It was moved to the private property owned by Willi Green in Orient, Ohio, and was replaced with a new porcelain-enamel restaurant. The property was home to Green's Heritage Museum and Historical Village, a collection of 14 historic buildings. The site hosted an annual event, Green's Farm Heritage Day, beginning in 1974. The restaurant building was used as the museum's gift shop.

In 2010, the Orient home and White Castle restaurant were featured in "White Castle on the Farm", an episode of American Pickers. In that same year, the building was again sold and moved, to a private collection in Rolla, Missouri.

Around 2016–2018, the original White Castle site was proposed to have a three-story mixed-use building built there. In 2021, the plan was abandoned and the site was put up for sale.

== See also ==
- White Castle Building No. 8
