= 100 percent corner =

Primary intersection in a city

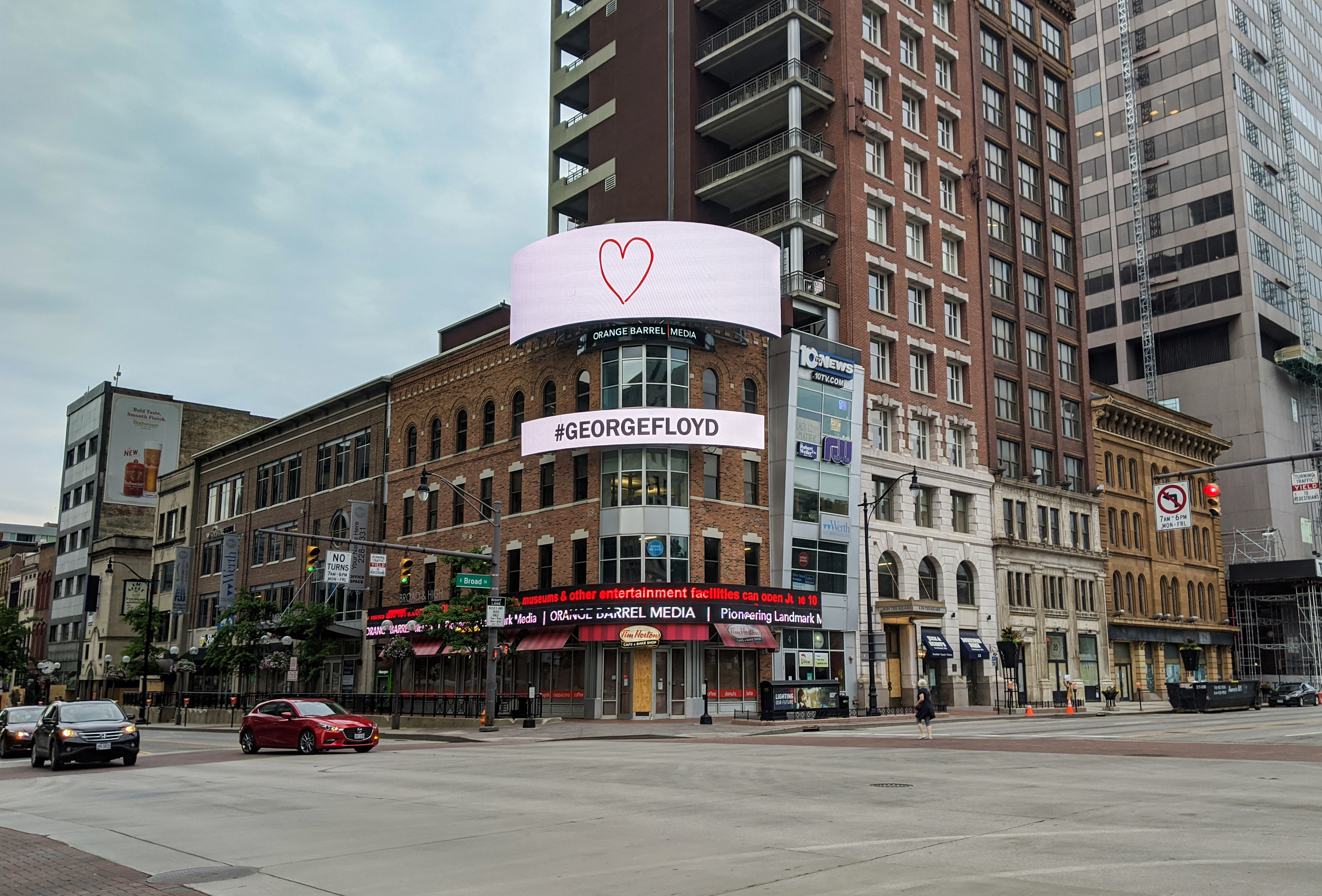
Broad and High Streets in Columbus, Ohio

The 100 percent corner is the busiest area in a city. Often it is a crossroads of several major streets, and the place with the highest land value and/or where grid plan numbering is based upon. The term is also used for the place for ideal real estate projects, sometimes considered the intersection of two highways in a suburban area. The terms "hundred percent location", "hundred percent corner", or "peak land value intersection" may also be used.

The 100 percent corner is used in research as part of a method to determine a city's downtown area, by measuring a radius (e.g. one mile) from the central intersection.

Examples

- Broad and High Streets in Columbus, Ohio
- Fayette Street and South Salina Street in Syracuse, New York
- Fourth and Muhammad Ali Boulevard in Louisville, Kentucky
- Church and Chapel Streets in New Haven, Connecticut

== See also ==
- City centre
