= Geography of Columbus, Ohio =

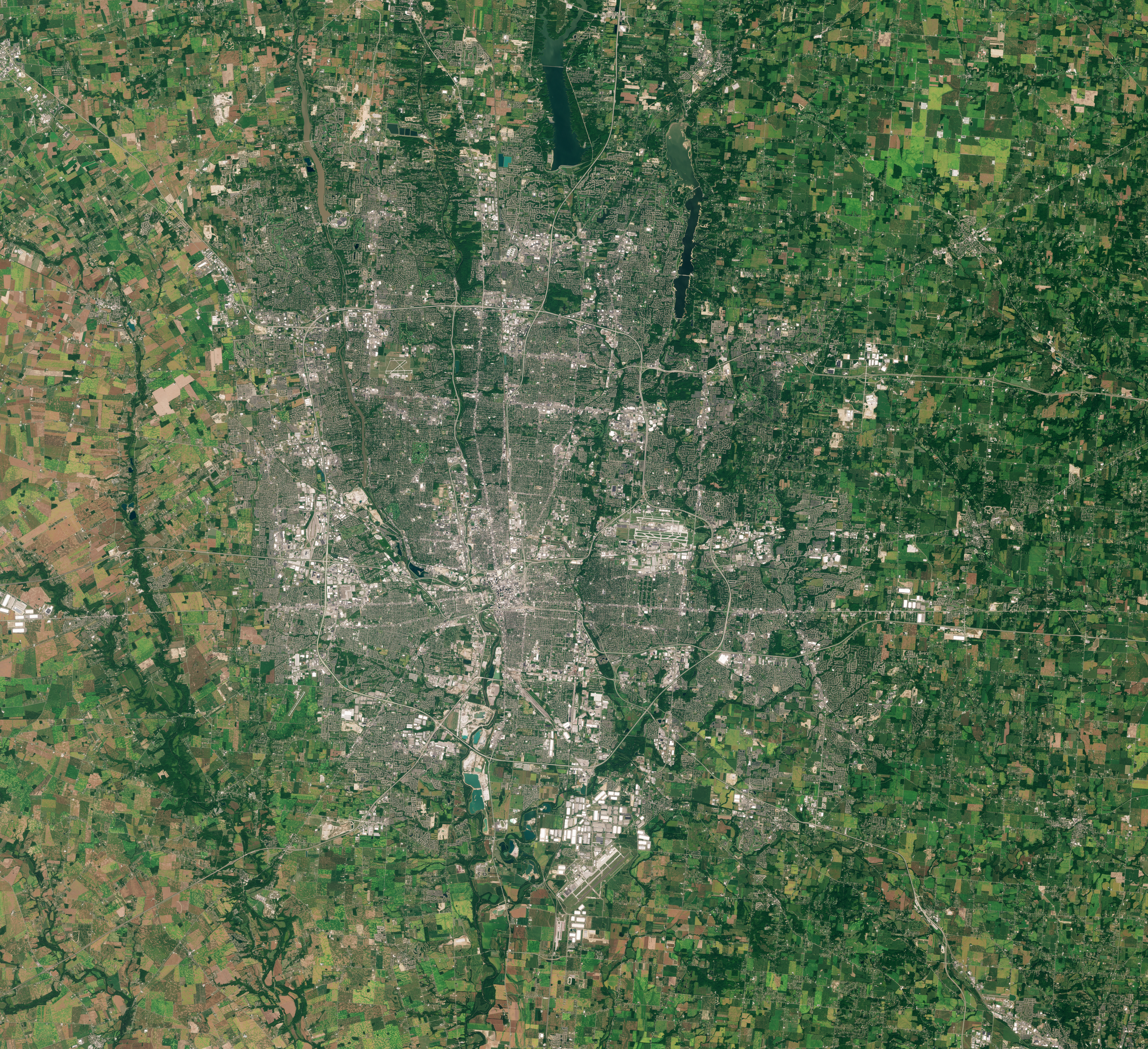
Satellite image of Columbus

The city of Columbus is located in central Ohio at the confluence of the Scioto and Olentangy rivers. The region is dominated by a humid continental climate, characterized by hot, muggy summers and cold, dry winters.

== Topography ==
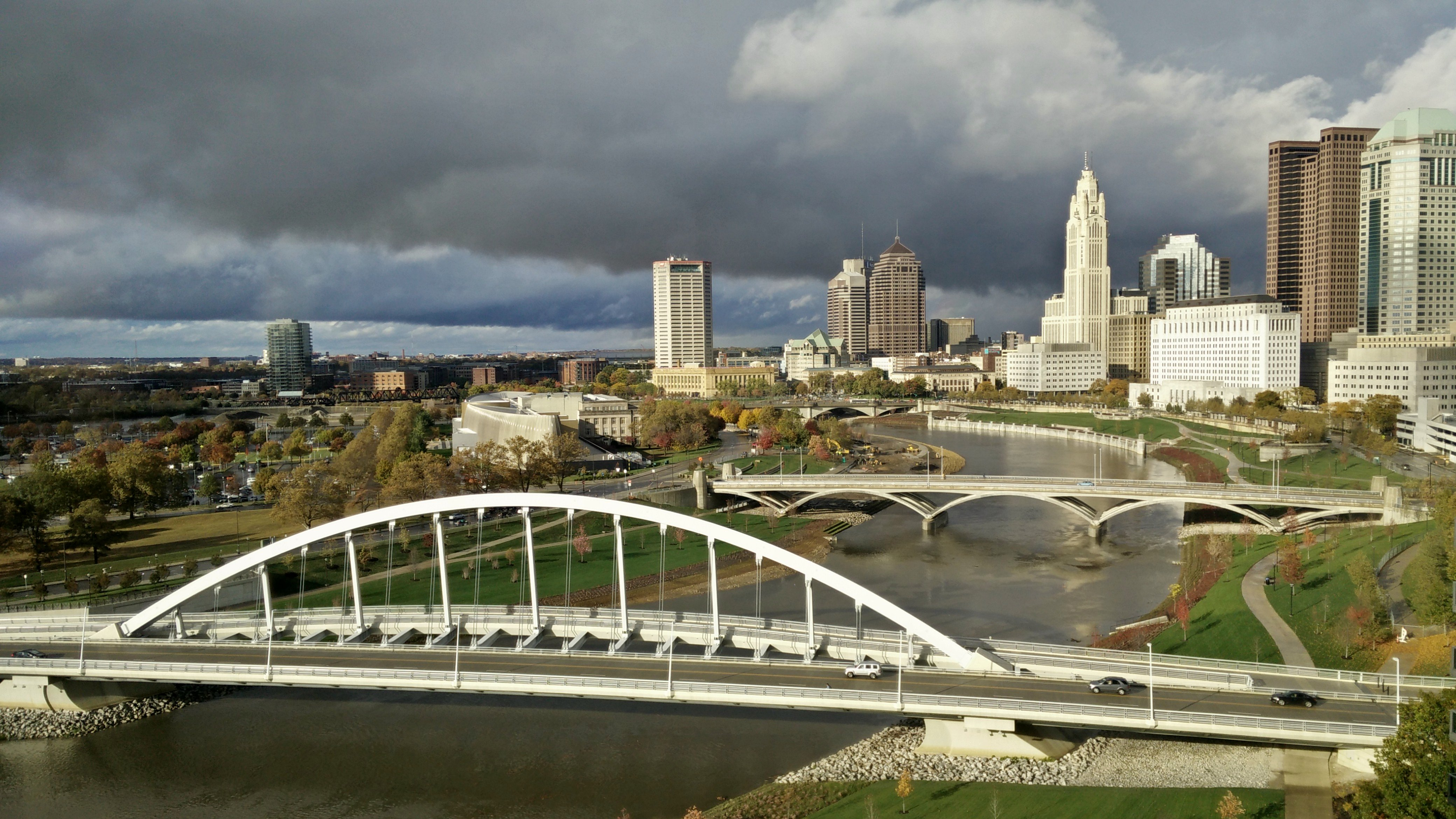
The Scioto River flows beside downtown Columbus

According to the United States Census Bureau, the city has a land area of 220.04 square miles (569.9 km^{2}). Unlike many other major US cities in the Midwest, Columbus continues to expand its reach by way of extensions and annexations, making it one of the fastest growing large cities in the nation, in terms of both geography and population, and probably the fastest in the Midwest. While Columbus' suburban population is not as large as Ohio's other two large metro areas, (Cleveland and Cincinnati), due to its annexation policies, it is almost entirely ringed by suburbs, and it even has some land-locked suburbs which are completely surrounded by Columbus' city limits. Some of Columbus' largest suburbs are Westerville, Gahanna, Reynoldsburg, Grove City, Upper Arlington, Hilliard and Dublin. Since the 1950s the city has made annexation a condition for providing water and sewer service, to which it holds regional rights throughout a large portion of central Ohio. This policy is credited with preserving Columbus' tax base in the face of the U.S.'s suburbanization and has contributed to its continued economic expansion, much like other cities pursuing similar policies such as San Antonio, Texas.

The confluence of the Scioto and Olentangy rivers occurs just west of downtown Columbus. Several smaller tributaries course through the Columbus metro area, including Alum Creek, Big Walnut Creek, and Darby Creek. Columbus is considered to have relatively flat topography thanks to a large glacier that covered most of Ohio during the Wisconsin Ice Age. However, there are sizable differences in elevation through the area, with the high point of Franklin County being 1132 ft (345 m) above sea level near New Albany, and the low point being 670 ft (207 m) where the Scioto River leaves the county near Lockbourne. Numerous ravine areas near the rivers and creeks also help give some variety to the landscape. Tributaries to Alum Creek and the Olentangy River cut through shale, while tributaries to the Scioto River cut through limestone. Deciduous trees are common, including maple, oak, hickory, walnut, poplar, cottonwood, and of course, buckeye.

Columbus is geographically very close to many major cities. It has a driving distance of less than four hours from Cincinnati, Cleveland, Detroit, Fort Wayne, Indianapolis, Lexington, Louisville, Pittsburgh, and Toledo. Likewise, Chicago, Milwaukee, Nashville, New York City, Washington, DC, St Louis, Atlanta, Charlotte, and Philadelphia are all within a day's drive of the city.

== Climate ==
Columbus

Climate chart (precipitation, max. and min. temperature)
J	F	M	A	M	J	J	A	S	O	N	D
2.7 37 23	2.3 41 25	3 51 33	3.4 63 43	4.2 73 52	4 82 62	4.8 85 65	3.3 84 64	2.8 77 56	2.6 65 45	3.2 53 36	3 40 27
- █ Average max. and min. temperatures in °F
- █ Precipitation totals in inches
- Source: NOAA
Metric conversion
J	F	M	A	M	J	J	A	S	O	N	D
69 3 −5	57 5 −4	77 11 0	86 17 6	106 23 11	102 28 16	122 29 19	84 29 18	72 25 14	66 18 7	81 11 2	75 5 −3
- █ Average max. and min. temperatures in °C
- █ Precipitation totals in mm

The city has, depending on definition, a humid continental or humid subtropical climate (Köppen climate classification Dfa or Cfa) characterized by hot, muggy summers and cold, comparatively dry winters, and lies in USDA Plant Hardiness Zone 6. January averages 29.6 °F (−1.3 °C), while July averages 75.2 °F (24.0 °C). Spring and autumn are mild and wet, but the latter is usually drier. The annual mean is 53.4 °F (11.9 °C). On average, temperatures reach 90 °F (32 °C) on 18 days of the year and 0 °F (−18 °C) on 2.9 nights, while the first freeze occurs on October 23 and the last on April 19.

The annual precipitation of 39.3 inches (998 mm) peaks, but not strongly so, in the latter half of spring and then summer; July is the wettest month while February is the driest. Passing cold fronts in winter frequently produce snow that is occasionally heavy, with a seasonal average of 28.1 inches (71.4 cm). On average, the first date of measurable, i.e. totalling 0.1 inches (0.25 cm) or more, snowfall is November 21 and the last March 31, with falls in October quite rare.

The hottest temperature ever recorded in Columbus was 106 °F (41 °C), which occurred twice during the Dust Bowl drought of the 1930s — once on July 21, 1934, and again two years later, on July 14, 1936. The coldest temperature ever recorded was −22 °F (−30 °C), occurring on January 19, 1994. The highest daily minimum temperature was 82 °F (28 °C) on January 10, 1881, and conversely, the lowest daily maximum was −7 °F (−22 °C) on February 9, 1899.

Columbus is subject to severe weather typical to the Midwestern United States. Severe thunderstorms producing tornadoes are possible from the spring to the fall, the most recent of which occurred on October 11, 2006, and caused F2 damage. Floods and blizzards can also occur from time to time.

Climate data for Columbus, Ohio (John Glenn Int'l), 1991–2020 normals, (Note: Mean monthly maxima and minima (i.e. the expected highest and lowest temperature readings at any point during the year or given month) calculated based on data at said location from 1991 to 2020.) extremes 1878–present (Note: Official records for Columbus were kept downtown from July 1878 to December 1947, and at John Glenn Int'l since January 1948. For more information, see Threadex)
Month	Jan	Feb	Mar	Apr	May	Jun	Jul	Aug	Sep	Oct	Nov	Dec	Year
Record high °F (°C)	74 (23)	78 (26)	86 (30)	90 (32)	96 (36)	102 (39)	106 (41)	103 (39)	100 (38)	94 (34)	80 (27)	76 (24)	106 (41)
Mean maximum °F (°C)	65.0 (18.3)	64.1 (17.8)	73.6 (23.1)	81.6 (27.6)	88.3 (31.3)	93.1 (33.9)	93.7 (34.3)	92.8 (33.8)	90.2 (32.3)	83.2 (28.4)	70.5 (21.4)	62.5 (16.9)	95.0 (35.0)
Mean daily maximum °F (°C)	37.1 (2.8)	40.8 (4.9)	51.1 (10.6)	64.1 (17.8)	74.1 (23.4)	82.2 (27.9)	85.4 (29.7)	84.1 (28.9)	77.8 (25.4)	65.5 (18.6)	52.3 (11.3)	41.5 (5.3)	63.0 (17.2)
Daily mean °F (°C)	29.6 (−1.3)	32.5 (0.3)	41.6 (5.3)	53.2 (11.8)	63.3 (17.4)	71.9 (22.2)	75.4 (24.1)	74.0 (23.3)	67.2 (19.6)	55.2 (12.9)	43.6 (6.4)	34.5 (1.4)	53.5 (11.9)
Mean daily minimum °F (°C)	22.0 (−5.6)	24.2 (−4.3)	32.0 (0.0)	42.2 (5.7)	52.4 (11.3)	61.6 (16.4)	65.4 (18.6)	63.9 (17.7)	56.5 (13.6)	44.8 (7.1)	35.0 (1.7)	27.4 (−2.6)	43.9 (6.6)
Mean minimum °F (°C)	1.7 (−16.8)	6.3 (−14.3)	14.5 (−9.7)	27.1 (−2.7)	37.8 (3.2)	48.6 (9.2)	55.7 (13.2)	54.3 (12.4)	43.2 (6.2)	31.1 (−0.5)	20.6 (−6.3)	11.0 (−11.7)	−0.9 (−18.3)
Record low °F (°C)	−22 (−30)	−20 (−29)	−6 (−21)	14 (−10)	25 (−4)	35 (2)	43 (6)	39 (4)	31 (−1)	17 (−8)	−5 (−21)	−17 (−27)	−22 (−30)
Average precipitation inches (mm)	3.00 (76)	2.41 (61)	3.62 (92)	3.85 (98)	3.99 (101)	4.33 (110)	4.67 (119)	3.74 (95)	3.14 (80)	2.90 (74)	2.79 (71)	3.13 (80)	41.57 (1,056)
Average snowfall inches (cm)	9.5 (24)	7.6 (19)	4.1 (10)	0.5 (1.3)	0.0 (0.0)	0.0 (0.0)	0.0 (0.0)	0.0 (0.0)	0.0 (0.0)	0.2 (0.51)	1.2 (3.0)	5.1 (13)	28.2 (72)
Average extreme snow depth inches (cm)	4.4 (11)	3.7 (9.4)	2.4 (6.1)	0.1 (0.25)	0.0 (0.0)	0.0 (0.0)	0.0 (0.0)	0.0 (0.0)	0.0 (0.0)	0.0 (0.0)	0.4 (1.0)	2.3 (5.8)	6.6 (17)
Average precipitation days (≥ 0.01 in)	14.7	11.8	12.5	13.7	14.0	11.7	10.9	9.5	8.7	10.0	10.5	12.7	140.7
Average snowy days (≥ 0.1 in)	9.0	6.7	4.0	1.0	0.0	0.0	0.0	0.0	0.0	0.1	1.9	5.6	28.3
Average relative humidity (%)	71.4	69.5	64.5	62.5	66.5	68.5	70.6	72.8	72.8	69.3	71.8	74.1	69.5
Average dew point °F (°C)	18.1 (−7.7)	20.5 (−6.4)	28.6 (−1.9)	37.4 (3.0)	48.9 (9.4)	58.3 (14.6)	62.8 (17.1)	61.7 (16.5)	55.2 (12.9)	42.6 (5.9)	33.6 (0.9)	24.3 (−4.3)	41.0 (5.0)
Mean monthly sunshine hours	110.6	126.3	162.0	201.8	243.4	258.1	260.9	235.9	212.0	183.1	104.2	84.3	2,182.6
Percentage possible sunshine	37	42	44	51	55	57	57	56	57	53	35	29	49
Average ultraviolet index	2	3	4	6	8	9	9	8	6	4	2	1	5
Source: NOAA (sun, relative humidity, and dew point 1961–1990) and Weather Atlas

== Cityscape ==
Interactive map of the city

Columbus also has a number of distinctive neighborhoods within the metro area. The Short North, situated just north of downtown, is rich with art galleries, dining, pubs, and specialty shops. A number of large, ornate Victorian homes are located nearby, and together they comprise Victorian Village. Just to the west is Harrison West and across the Olentangy River is Grandview Heights. To the south, German Village is known for its quaint 19th-century brick cottages, and it holds the distinction as the largest privately funded historic district on the National Register of Historic Places. Immediately west is the Brewery District, formerly an entertainment district which has seen a decrease in bars and an increase in residential and office development. To the east of Downtown north of Broad St. is King-Lincoln Bronzeville, or just "King-Lincoln", which was the cultural and commercial hub of the African-American community. South of Broad and also east of King Lincoln is Olde Towne East, which was a well-to-do streetcar neighborhood consisting of grand homes in a wide variety of architectural styles. Most of these neighborhoods have all undergone gentrification on a large scale. Franklinton, sometimes known as "the Bottoms", is the neighborhood immediately west of downtown. Just to the west of Franklinton is a group of smaller neighborhoods collectively known as The Hilltop.

At the north end of downtown is a new development/neighborhood, the Arena District. Centered around the Nationwide Arena, the district has many pubs, restaurants, and residential projects, most notably the new 20-story Condominiums at North Bank Park tower. The Lifestyle Communities Pavilion is also an anchor for the district and the recently completed Huntington Ballpark has become the new home of the Columbus Clippers minor league baseball team.

There are also the Heritage Districts, which include the Driving Park, Livingston Park and Old Oaks areas on the near east side of the city, home to a part of the city's large black population.

The University area is populated by a high concentration of students during the school year (approximately 60,000) and features many old homes which have been converted to apartments for student use. The stretch of High Street that runs through the campus area caters to the student body with its abundance of bars, sandwich shops, music stores, and bookstores. Located between OSU and Worthington is Clintonville, where a mix of middle class homes can be found alongside beautiful old stone and brick-faced houses nestled among rolling hills. Further west of downtown, San Margherita is a community formed by Italian immigrants who arrived at the turn of the 20th century.

== Transportation ==
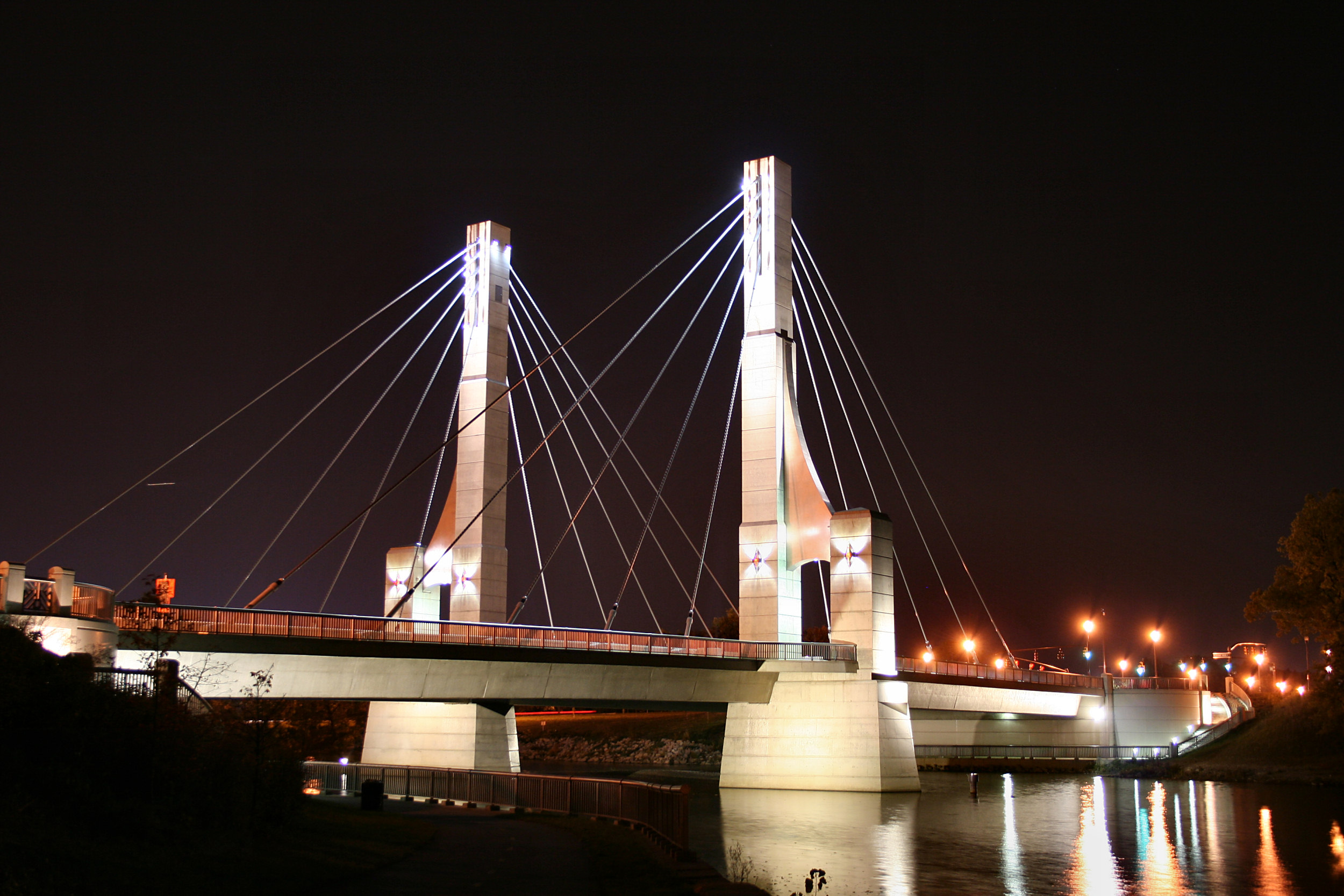
Lane Avenue Bridge, University District

=== Grid and address system ===
The city's street plan originates downtown and extends into the old-growth neighborhoods, following a grid pattern with the intersection of High Street (running north–south) and Broad Street (running east–west) at its center. North–south streets run twelve degrees west of due North, parallel to High Street; the Avenues (vis. Fifth Avenue, Sixth Avenue, Seventh Avenue, etc.) run east–west. The address system begins its numbering at the intersection of Broad and High, with numbers increasing in magnitude with distance from Broad or High. Numbered Avenues begin with First Avenue, about 1¼ mile north of Broad Street, and increase in number as one progresses northward. Numbered Streets begin with Second Street, which is two blocks west of High Street, and Third Street, which is a block east of High Street, then progress eastward from there. Even-numbered addresses are on the north and east sides of streets, putting odd addresses on the south and west sides of streets. A difference of 700 house numbers means a distance of about one mile (along the same street). For example, 351 W 5th Avenue is approximately one-half mile west of High Street on the south side of Fifth Avenue. Buildings along north–south streets are numbered in a similar manner: the building number indicates the approximate distance from Broad Street, the prefixes ‘N’ and ‘S’ indicate whether that distance is to measured to the north or south of Broad Street and the street number itself indicates how far the street is from the center of the city at the intersection of Broad and High.

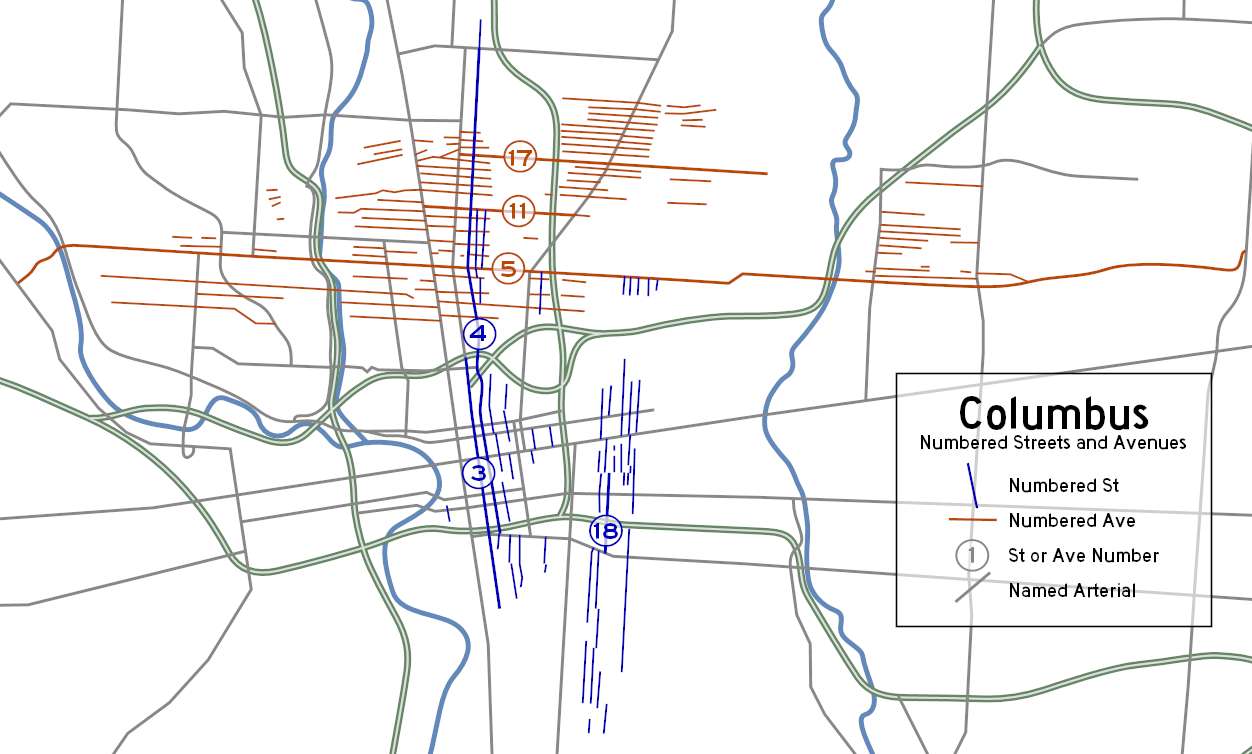
Locations of numbered streets and avenues

This street numbering system does not hold true over a large area. The area served by numbered Avenues runs from about Marble Cliff to South Linden to the Airport, and the area served by numbered Streets covers Downtown and nearby neighborhoods to the east and south, with only a few exceptions. There are quite few intersections between numbered Streets and Avenues. Furthermore, named Streets and Avenues can have any orientation. For example, while all of the numbered avenues run east–west, perpendicular to High Street, many named, non-numbered avenues run north–south, parallel to High. The same is true of many named streets: while the numbered streets in the city run north–south, perpendicular to Broad Street, many named, non-numbered streets run east–west, perpendicular to High Street.

The addressing system, however, covers nearly all of Franklin County, with only a few older suburbs retaining self-centered address systems. The address scale of 700 per mile results in addresses approaching, but not usually reaching, 10,000 at the county's borders.

Other major, local roads in Columbus include Main Street, Morse Road, Dublin-Granville Road (SR-161), Cleveland Avenue/Westerville Road (SR-3), Olentangy River Road, Riverside Drive, Sunbury Road, Fifth Avenue and Livingston Avenue.

=== Highways ===
Columbus is bisected by two major Interstate Highways, Interstate 70 running east–west, and Interstate 71 running north to roughly southwest. The two Interstates combine downtown for about 1.5 miles (2.4 km) in an area locally known as "The Split", which is a major traffic congestion point within Columbus, especially during rush hour. U.S. Route 40, a.k.a. National Road, runs east–west through Columbus, comprising Main Street to the east of downtown and Broad Street to the west. U.S. Route 23 runs roughly north–south, while U.S. Route 33 runs northwest-to-southeast. The Interstate 270 Outerbelt encircles the vast majority of the city, while the newly redesigned Innerbelt consists of the Interstate 670 spur on the north side (which continues to the east past the Airport and to the west where it merges with I-70), State Route 315 on the west side, the I-70/71 split on the south side, and I-71 on the east. Due to its central location within Ohio and abundance of outbound roadways, nearly all of the state's destinations are within a 2-hour drive of Columbus.

=== Airports ===
The area has several airports, most notably John Glenn International Airport on the east side of the city. John Glenn International provides service to a few foreign and dozens of domestic destinations, including all the major hubs except Los Angeles, San Francisco, and Seattle. Port Columbus was a hub for discount carrier Skybus Airlines and is for NetJets, the world's largest fractional ownership air carrier. Rickenbacker International Airport, in southern Franklin County, is a major cargo facility and is important to the Ohio Air National Guard. OSU Don Scott Airport and Bolton Field are significant general-aviation facilities in the Columbus area.

=== Rail ===
Columbus used to have a major train station downtown called Union Station, most notably as a stop along Amtrak's National Limited train service until 1977. The station itself was razed in 1979, and the Greater Columbus Convention Center now stands in its place. The station was also a stop along the Cleveland, Columbus and Cincinnati Railroad and the Pittsburgh, Cincinnati, Chicago and St. Louis Railroad. Columbus is now the largest metropolitan area in the U.S. without passenger rail service, after Phoenix introduced a light-rail system in December 2008; however studies are underway towards reintroducing passenger rail service to Columbus via the Ohio Hub project. A streetcar was planned in Downtown Columbus, and there was a plan for light rail service between downtown and the Polaris area. Plans to open a high-speed rail service connecting Columbus with Cincinnati and Cleveland were eliminated after Governor John Kasich was elected into office.

=== Bus ===
Columbus maintains a widespread municipal bus service called the Central Ohio Transit Authority (COTA).

=== Bicycle ===
Bicycling as transportation is steadily increasing in Columbus with its relatively flat terrain, intact urban neighborhoods, large student population, and off-road bike paths. The city has recently put forth the 2012 Bicentennial Bikeways Plan as well as a move toward a Complete Streets policy. Grassroots efforts such as Bike To Work Week, Consider Biking, Yay Bikes, Third Hand Bicycle Co-op, Franklinton Cycleworks, and Cranksters, a local radio program focused on urban cycling, have contributed to cycling as transportation.

Columbus also hosts urban cycling "off-shots" with messenger-style "alleycat" races as well as unorganized group rides, a monthly Critical Mass ride, bicycle polo, art showings, movie nights, and a variety of bicycle-friendly businesses and events throughout the year. All this activity occurs despite Columbus's lack of on-road cycling lanes and frequently inclement weather.
