= Worthington Presbyterian Church =

Historic church in Ohio, United States

- Worthington United Presbyterian Church
- U.S. National Register of Historic Places
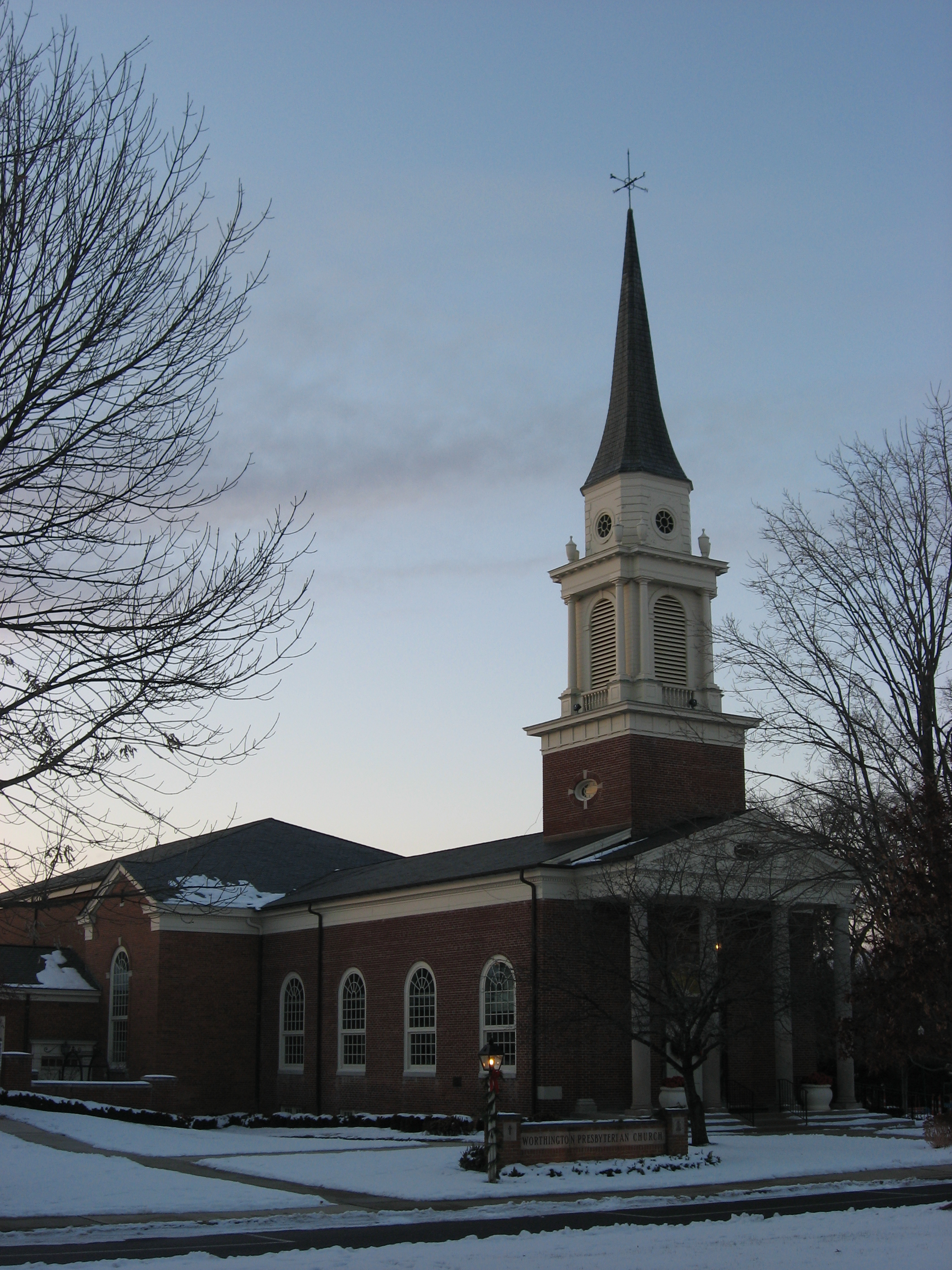
- Front of the church

- Location within Ohio Location within the United States
- Location: High St. and W. Granville Rd., Worthington, Ohio
- Coordinates: 40°5′22″N 83°1′8″W
- Area: less than one acre
- Built: 1830
- Architect: Martin, Orr and Martin
- Architectural style: Colonial Revival
- MPS: Worthington MRA
- NRHP reference No.: 80003023
- Added to NRHP: April 17, 1980

Worthington Presbyterian Church is a historic church in Worthington, Ohio, United States founded in 1805.

The congregation worships in a Colonial Revival church building that was built in 1927. Under the name of "Worthington United Presbyterian Church," it was listed on the National Register of Historic Places in 1980.

It was designed in Late Gothic Revival style by Columbus, Ohio architects Martin, Orr and Martin, who were in practice together from 1924 to 1927. They also designed the Late Gothic Revival First Baptist Church of Boulder, in Boulder, Colorado, which was built in 1925–26.
