= Short North Historic District =

Historic district in Ohio, United States

- U.S. National Register of Historic Places
- U.S. Historic district
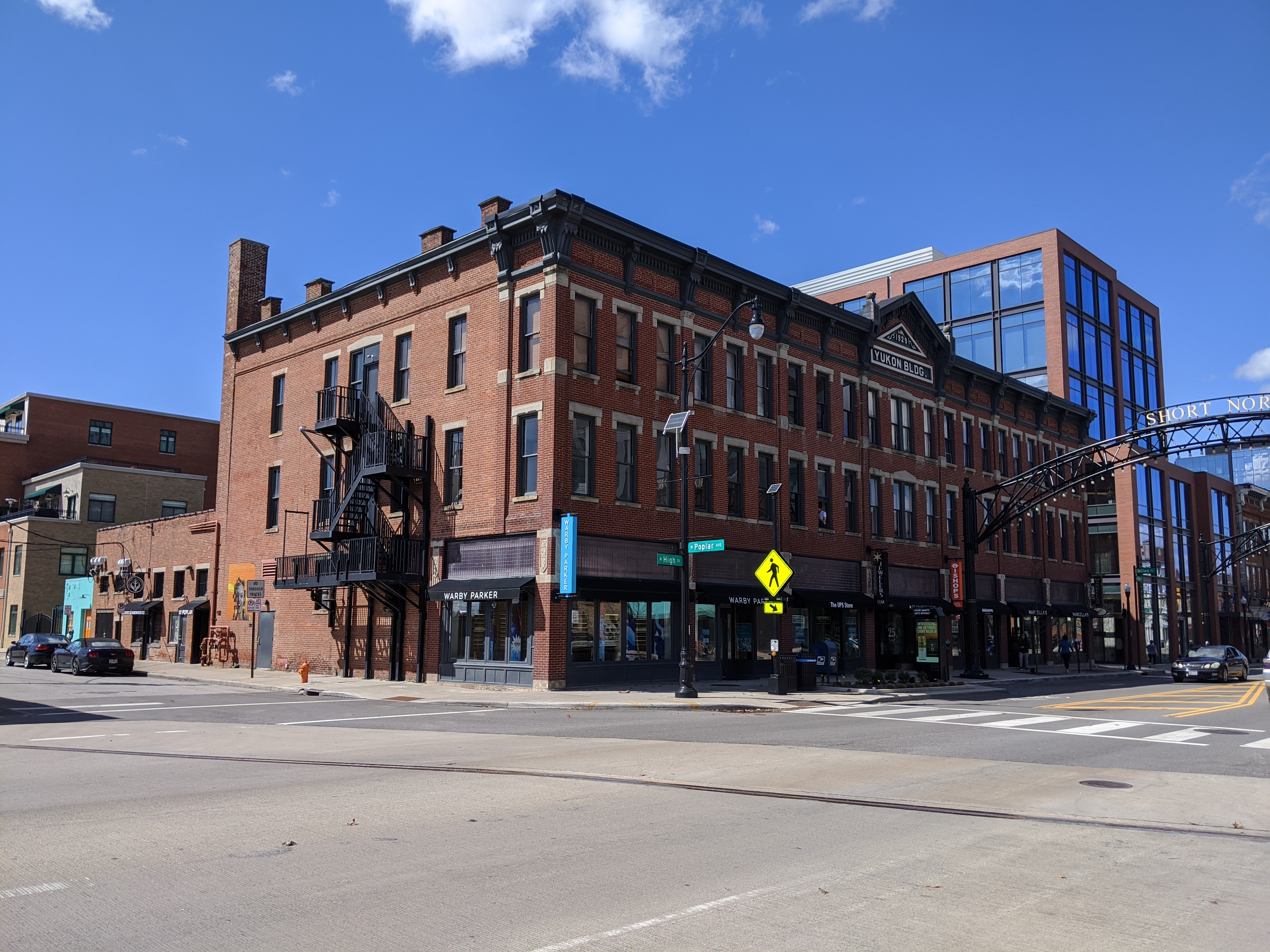
- The Yukon Building
- Interactive map
- Location: N. High St. roughly between W. Poplar Ave. and Warren St., Columbus, Ohio
- Coordinates: 39.976111°N 83.003333°W
- NRHP reference No.: 90000583
- Added to NRHP: April 19, 1990

The Short North Historic District is a historic district in The Short North neighborhood of Columbus, Ohio. The district was listed on the National Register of Historic Places in 1990.

== Gallery ==
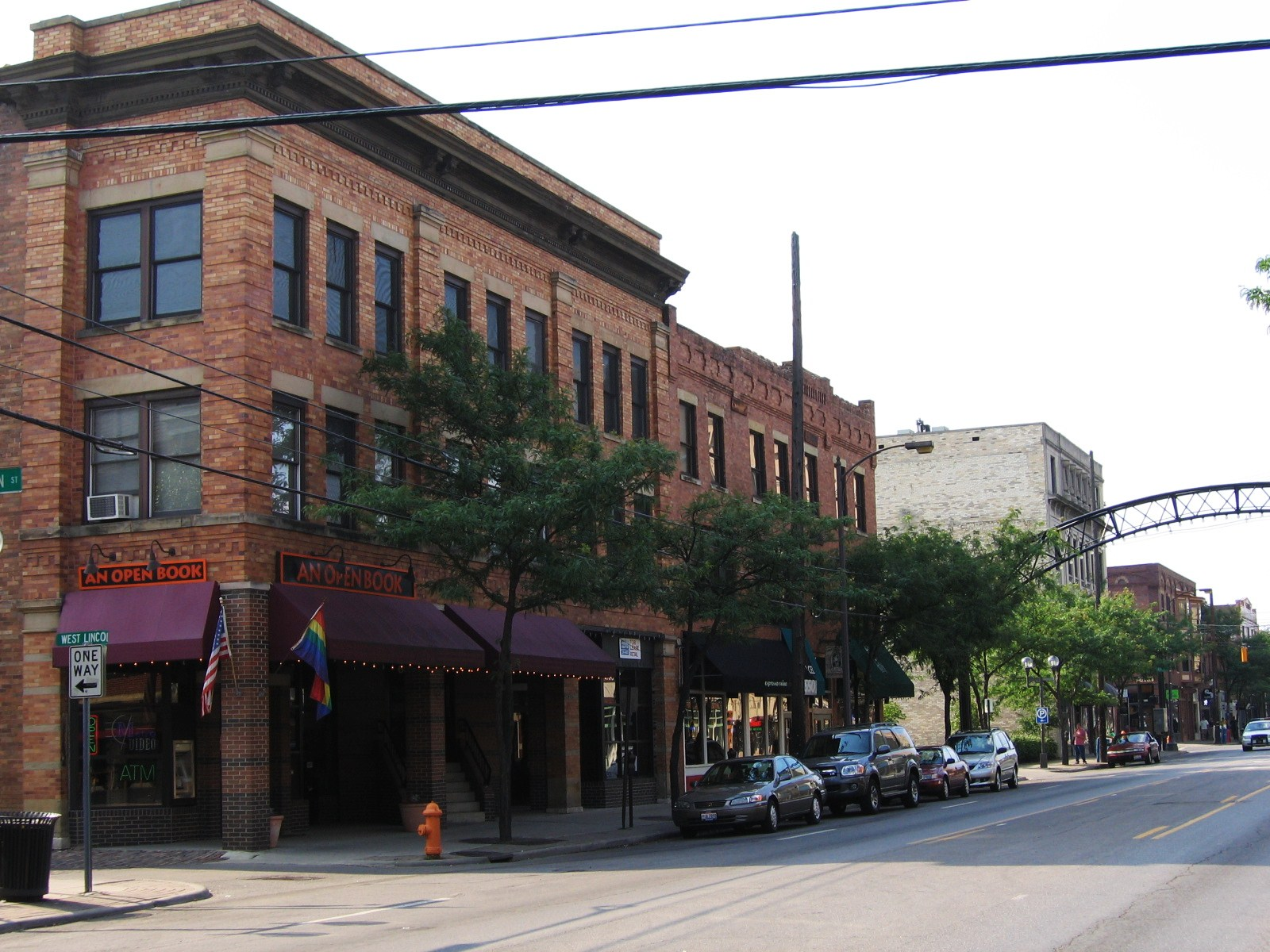
McKinley Building and 691 N. High

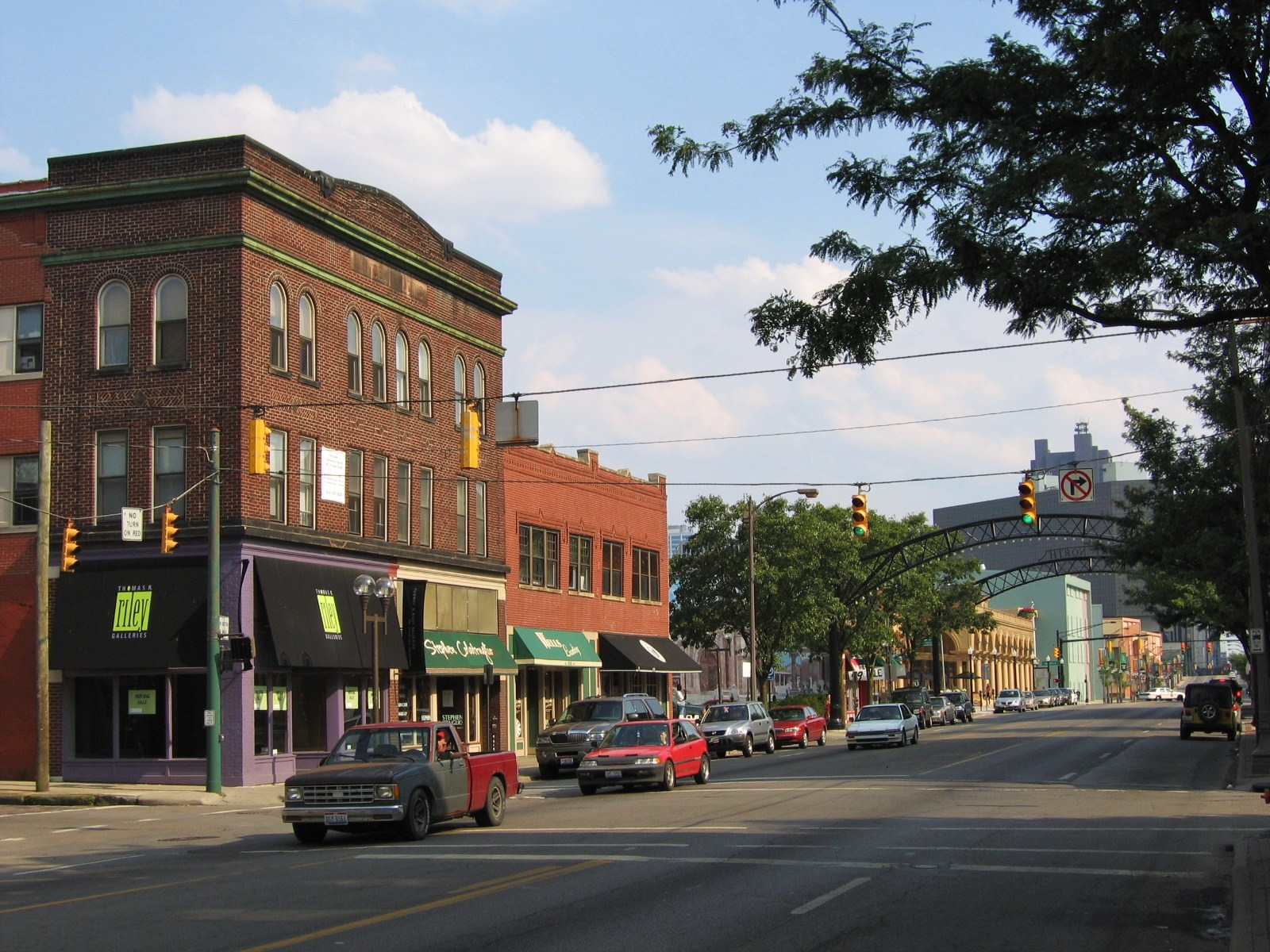
Joyce and Wallenheimer Building

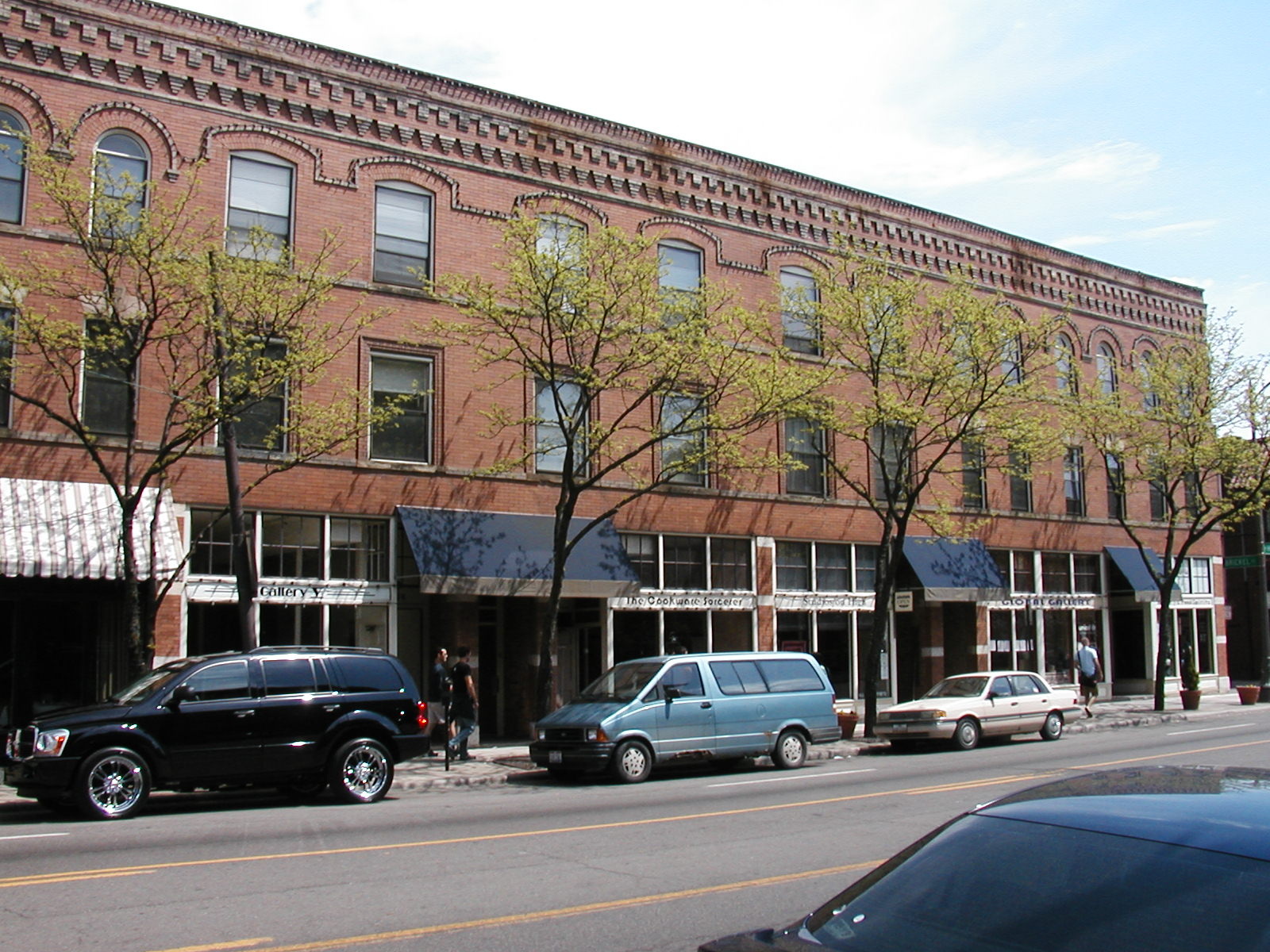
Lincoln and Maurice Buildings

== See also ==
- National Register of Historic Places listings in Columbus, Ohio
