= New England Lodge =

- U.S. National Register of Historic Places
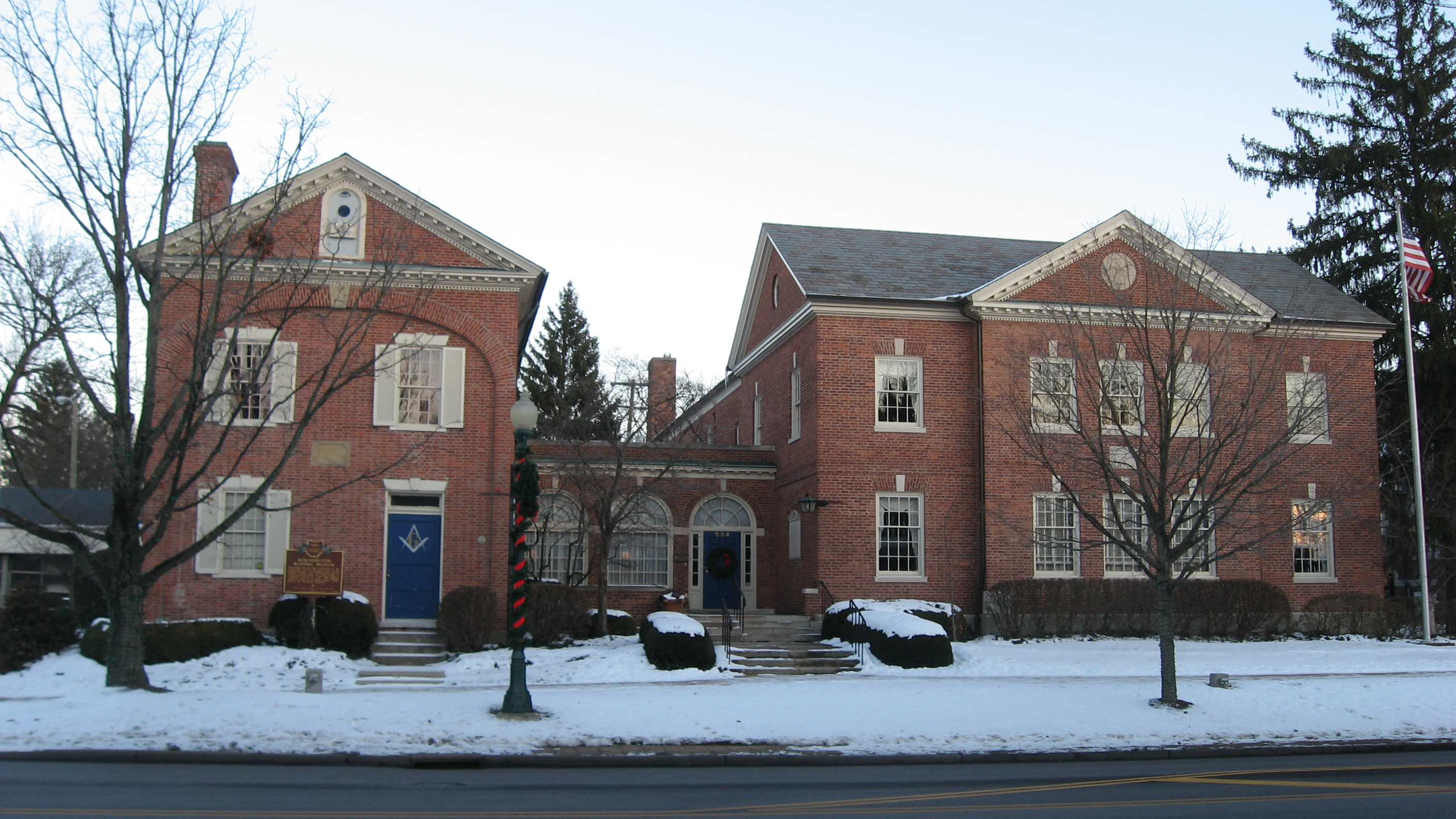

- Location within Ohio Location within the United States
- Location: 634 N. High St., Worthington, Ohio
- Coordinates: 40°05′10″N 83°01′04″W
- Area: 0.1 acres (0.040 ha)
- Built: 1820
- Architect: John Snow
- MPS: Worthington MRA
- NRHP reference No.: 73001444
- Added to NRHP: March 20, 1973

The New England Lodge, at 634 N. High St. in Worthington, Ohio, was built in 1820. As of 1999, the Masonic lodge was the longest in continuous use for Masonic purposes west of the Allegheny Mountains.

It was listed on the National Register of Historic Places in 1973.

In 2016, there were plans to convert much of the lodge building into condominiums, although reserving part to serve as a Masonic museum and offices.
