= Hartman Stock Farm Historic District =

Historic district in Ohio, United States

- Formerly listed on the U.S. National Register of Historic Places
- U.S. Historic district
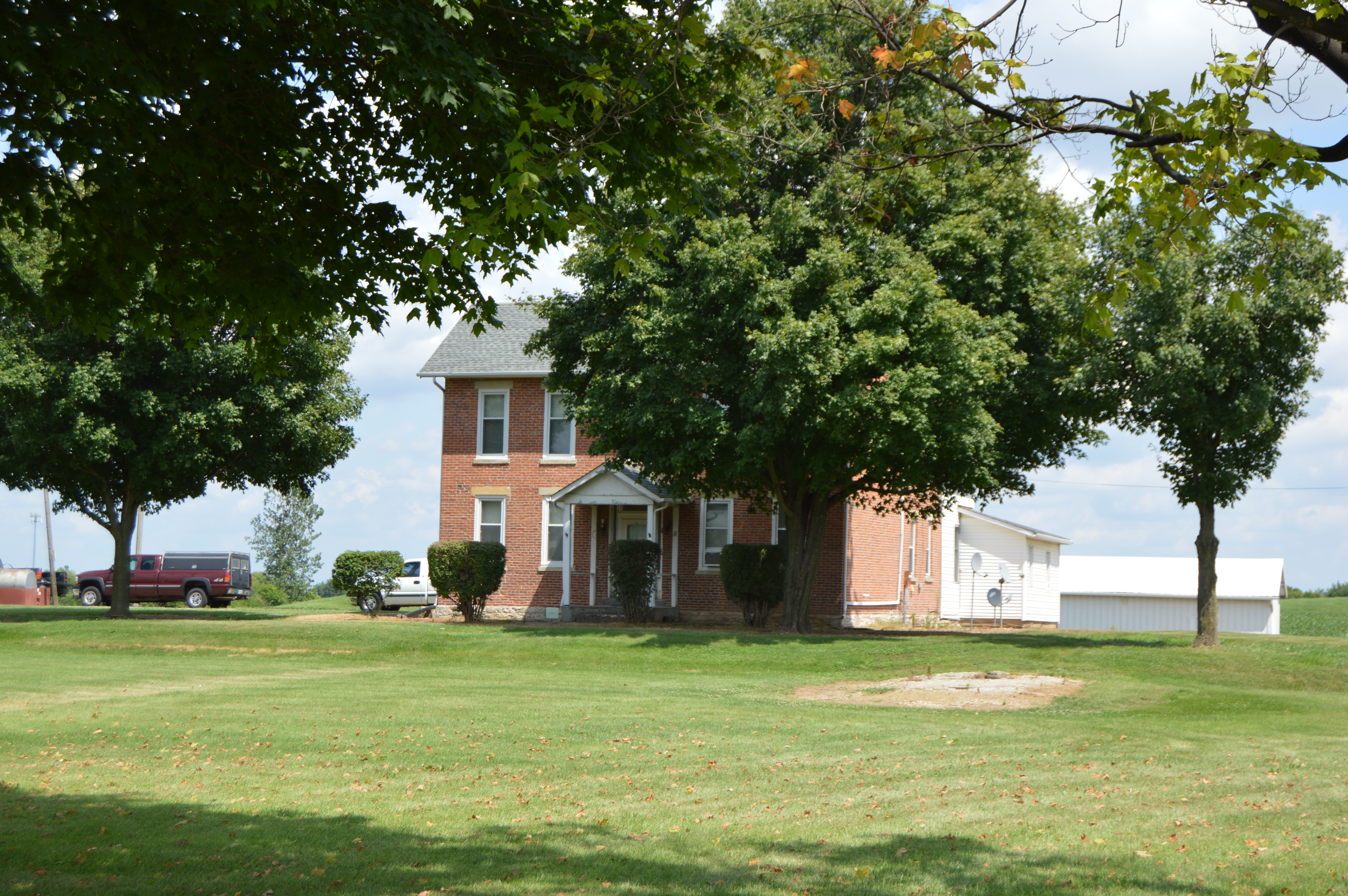
- The foreman's house
- Interactive map
- Location: South of Downtown Columbus on U.S. Route 23 (S. High St.), Columbus, Ohio
- Coordinates: 39.856667°N 83.002222°W
- NRHP reference No.: 74001492

Significant dates
- Added to NRHP: October 9, 1974
- Removed from NRHP: February 10, 2022

The Hartman Stock Farm Historic District was a historic district in Columbus, Ohio. The district was listed on the National Register of Historic Places from 1974 to 2022.

The district is the site of Hartman Farm, a 5,000-acre farm founded by Samuel B. Hartman in 1903. Hartman was known for his Peruna manufacturing business in downtown Columbus, but later began to acquire land for the farm. The Hartman Farm began with 2,400 acres, though Hartman increased its size to spanning four miles down South High St., with frontage along the Scioto River. After the farm's demise, many of its buildings were demolished, and the farm was reduced to about 2,200 acres. Today, the only remaining buildings include the foreman's house, one of the dairy barns, a one-room schoolhouse, and another home.

In 2021, Google proposed building a large data center on the site. Columbus City Council approved a zoning change and a $54 million tax abatement for the development, despite protests from local residents and the Columbus Landmarks Foundation. The site was removed from the National Register in 2022.

== See also ==
- National Register of Historic Places listings in Columbus, Ohio
