= Old North End Historic District (Columbus, Ohio) =

Historic district in Ohio, United States

- U.S. National Register of Historic Places
- U.S. Historic district
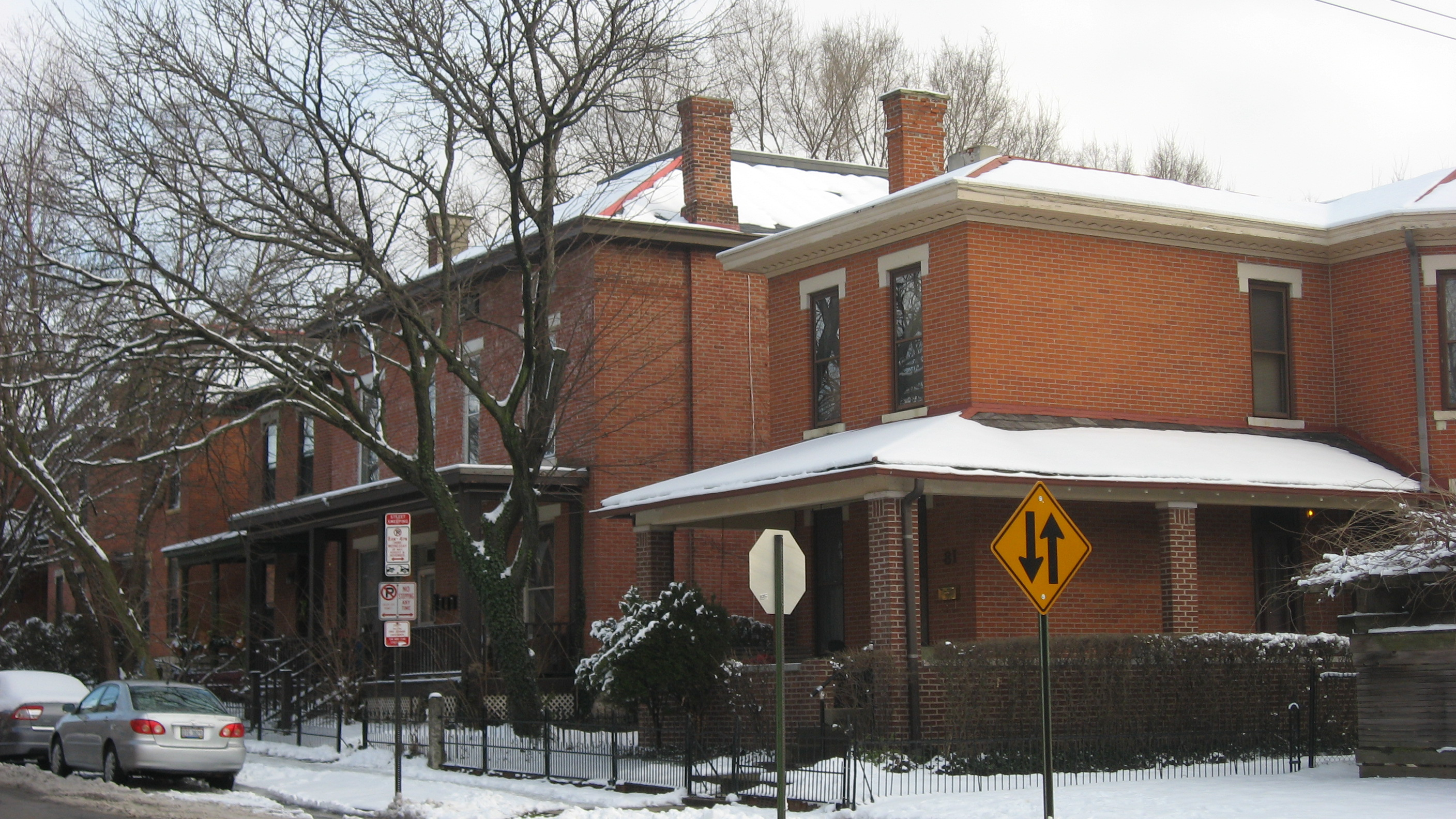
- Interactive map
- Location: Roughly bounded by Interstate 670, Pearl St., E. 2nd Ave., and N. 4th St.; also roughly bounded by W. 1st and E. 2nd Ave., N. Pearl St., E. 5th Ave., Summit St., and Beacon Alley, Columbus, Ohio
- Coordinates: 39.978889°N 83.000833°W
- NRHP reference No.: 96000964 (original); 99000702 (increase)

Significant dates
- Added to NRHP: August 30, 1996
- Boundary increase: June 10, 1999

The Old North End Historic District is a historic district in the Italian Village neighborhood of Columbus, Ohio. It was listed on the National Register of Historic Places in 1996. A boundary increase was approved to the register in 1999. District boundaries overlap with the city's Italian Village Historic District.

The historic district is primarily residential, dating to the 19th and early 20th centuries. The neighborhood primarily housed railroad workers employed at the nearby Union Station. The district is one of few remaining structures related to the rail industry in the city, as its stations, yards, and many of its warehouses have been demolished. Other rail worker neighborhoods like Flytown have since been demolished as well. The Old North End Historic District is also the earliest of the city's north side districts.

== See also ==
- National Register of Historic Places listings in Columbus, Ohio
