= COVID-19 pandemic in Columbus, Ohio =

- Disease: COVID-19
- Pathogen: SARS-CoV-2
- Location: Columbus, Ohio
- Index case: March 14, 2020
- Arrival date: February 27, 2020
- Confirmed cases: 69,244 city-wide (March 11, 2021)
- Suspected cases: 11,483 city-wide (March 11, 2021)
- Hospitalized cases: 2,768 city-wide (March 11, 2021)
- Deaths: 987 city-wide (March 11, 2021)

Government website
- www.columbus.gov/coronavirus/ www.columbus.gov/covid19resources/

The COVID-19 pandemic is an ongoing viral pandemic of coronavirus disease 2019 (COVID-19), a novel infectious disease caused by severe acute respiratory syndrome coronavirus 2 (SARS-CoV-2). The pandemic affected the city of Columbus, Ohio, as Ohio's stay-at-home order shuttered all nonessential businesses, and caused event cancellations into 2021. The shutdown led to protests at the Ohio Statehouse, the state capitol building.

The COVID-19 pandemic muted activity in Columbus, especially in its downtown core, from 2020 to 2022. By late 2022, foot traffic in Downtown Columbus began to exceed pre-pandemic rates; one of the quickest downtown areas to recover in the United States.

== History ==
=== Background ===
On March 9, Governor Mike DeWine reported Ohio's first 3 cases in Cuyahoga County, in northeast Ohio. Ohio restaurants and bars shuttered March 15, by 9 p.m., less than six hours before closures set to take place. first state. On March 18, DeWine ordered nail and hair salons, barbershops, and tattoo parlors closed. He also closed all but five Bureau of Motor Vehicles offices. On March 20, record-level rains led to flash flooding in Central Ohio. 61 people from Franklin and Licking County were placed in hotels due to house flood damage. The Red Cross stated it would normally open a shelter, but wouldn't due to the coronavirus threat.

=== Timeline ===
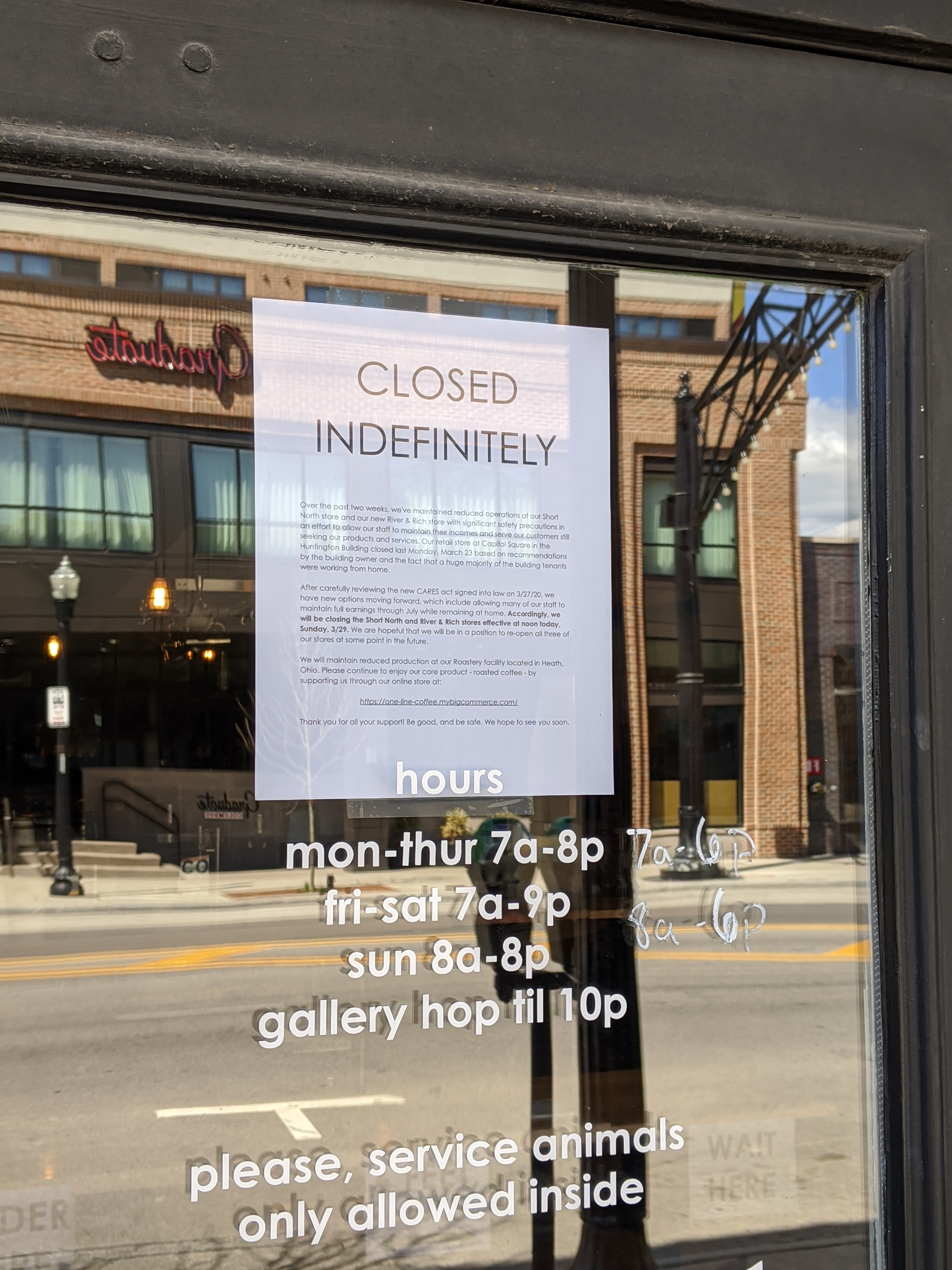
One of many business closure signs in the Short North

Events:

2020

- March 2: Columbus Public Health, the city's health department, issues tips to the public regarding coronavirus
- March 10: Ohio reports first cases, state of emergency declared in Ohio
- March 12: first cases of community spread in Ohio; DeWine orders limiting gatherings to fewer than 100 individuals
- March 13: the Columbus Board of Health declares a local public health emergency
- March 14: Columbus reports its first case of coronavirus
- March 16: DeWine limits gatherings to no more than 50 people; most county municipal court hearings are postponed; visitors prohibited from jails and correctional facilities
- March 17: second case of coronavirus reported in Columbus, suggesting community spread
- March 18: Mayor Andrew Ginther declares a local state of emergency; Columbus alters parking rules; Department of Building and Zoning Services closes its public office and cancels upcoming meetings; Area Commissions cancels two months of meetings
- March 20: first coronavirus-related death in Ohio; street sweeping delayed in Columbus
- March 22: DeWine gives a stay-at-home order for Ohio
- March 23: first coronavirus-related deaths in Franklin County
- March 24: DeWine outlines what is considered "essential businesses and industries" during the "Stay at home" order he conducted
- March 31: New homeless shelters have been opened for men, woman and families who have been diagnosed with COVID-19 or is showing symptoms of the virus
- April 2: DeWine has extended the stay at home order through May 1
- April 3: The Columbus-area Hocking Hills State Park has been closed due to COVID-19
- April 5: 416 confirmed cases of COVID-19 reported in Columbus and Worthington
- April 9: During a coronavirus briefing at the Ohio Statehouse, about 50 people protested Governor DeWine and Amy Acton, director of the Ohio Department of Health, in opposition to the stay-at-home order.
- April 10: Columbus Public Health begins weekly reports into Columbus and Worthington coronavirus cases.
- April 13: Protests were held again outside the Statehouse, with signs reading "Stop the tyranny", "Survival is not living", and "Quarantine worse than virus", among statements against DeWine and Acton.
- April 15: The City of Columbus announces plans to crack down on mass gatherings.
- April 16: DeWine announces plans to gradually reopen businesses on May 1.
- May 15: Columbus and all of Ohio's hair salons, barbershops, and nail salons reopen, along with restaurant and bar outdoor dining spaces. Restaurants and bars can reopen their indoor dining rooms beginning on May 21.
- July 2: Mayor Ginther orders the use of face masks in public in Columbus.
- September 1: A vaccine, developed by the University of Oxford and pharmaceutical company AstraZeneca, was going into clinical trials for 30,000 participants worldwide, with 500 participants at The Ohio State University Wexner Medical Center location.
- September 9: The trials at Ohio State for a potential COVID-19 vaccine were put on hold after a UK participant developed an unexplained illness.
- November 15: Columbus and Franklin County Metro Parks begins requiring masks in its parks, following an updated mask mandate in Ohio.
- November 16: The Columbus Zoo and Aquarium, following guidelines issued by the Metro Parks system, begins requiring masks in its outdoor spaces, after previously only requiring them inside its buildings.
- November 18: Columbus and Franklin County Public Health announce a stay-at-home advisory. The advisory urges people to only leave home for work or school, or for essential needs like medical care. The advisory is not set to be enforced.

2021

- January 13: Researchers at the Ohio State University in Columbus detect two new strains of the coronavirus, including one known as the "Columbus strain", predominant in infection in the city since late December and early January.
- March 19: A pop-up mass vaccination site will open at St. John Arena in Columbus. Later in the month, a long-term mass vaccination site will open at the Celeste Center in downtown Columbus, one of sixteen in Ohio.
- June 7: The Columbus City Council repeals the city's mask ordinance.
- September 10: Mayor Ginther signs an executive order requiring everyone, regardless of vaccination status, to wear a mask in public indoor spaces.

=== Advisory level timeline ===
Franklin County has been rated for COVID-19 severity under Ohio's Public Health Advisory System and the CDC's COVID-19 community transmission map.

2020

- July 2: The Ohio Public Health Advisory System is established. Franklin County is rated "Level 3" or "Red", the second-highest warning level in the advisory system.
- August 27: Franklin County is downgraded to "Level 2" or "Orange", the second-lowest warning level in the advisory system.
- October 15: Franklin County is elevated to "Level 3" or "Red".
- November 19: Franklin County is elevated to "Level 4" or "Purple", the highest of Ohio's COVID warning levels, and the first county to rise to the level.
- December 3: Franklin County is downgraded to "Level 3" or "Red".

2021

- April 15: Franklin County is elevated to "Level 4" or "Purple".
- April 29: Franklin County is downgraded to "Level 3" or "Red"
- May 27: Ohio retires the Public Health Advisory System.
- July 30: The CDC's COVID community transmission map indicates Franklin County has a substantial (orange) incidence of COVID-19 spread.
- August 9: Franklin County is elevated to show a high incidence of COVID-19 spread, indicated in red.

=== Ohio Statehouse protests and counter-protests ===
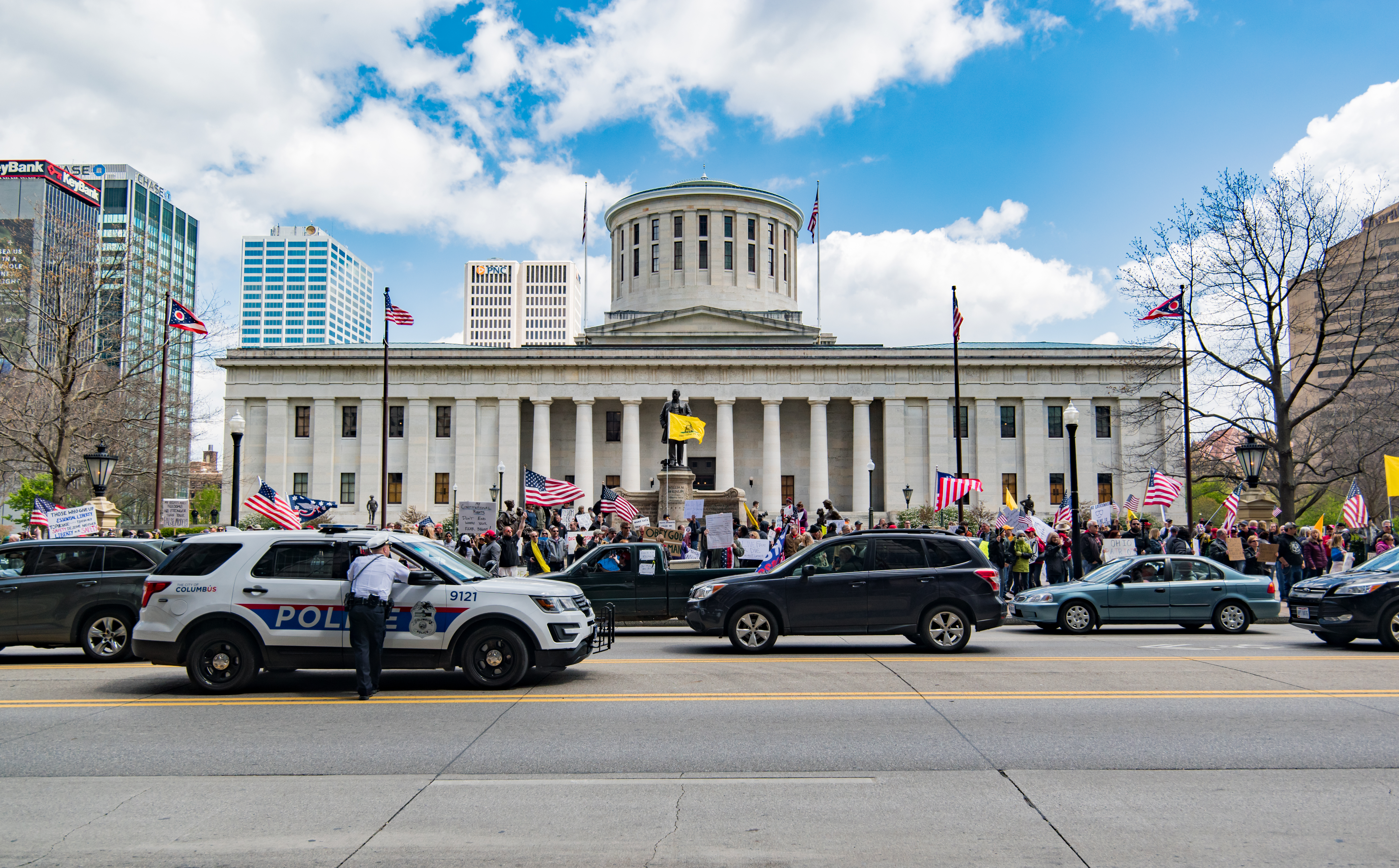
Protesting the shutdown and business closures at the Ohio Statehouse on April 18

Multiple protests over the state's handling of the pandemic have taken place in Columbus. Protesters from various groups gathered at the Ohio Statehouse for "Open Our Ohio" rallies on April 9, 13, and 18. On the 18th, hundreds protested the state "infringing on personal rights", with signs also against vaccinations, abortions, postponing Ohio's primaries, and closing businesses. Cars and trucks circled the Statehouse while honking, and protesters lined High Street for about one and a half hours.

On April 24, the Ohio Organizing Collaborative protested at the Statehouse. The group pushed for 20,000 prisoners to be released from Ohio prisons to stop the virus's spread. Two of the largest outbreaks in the U.S. have been in Ohio prisons. Like past protests, the participants circled the statehouse in cars honking their horns, although some protesters staged a die-in, lying beside the Statehouse steps. On April 25, the Toledo Tea Party resumed shutdown protests at the state capitol. Another stay-at-home order protest took place on May 1, the day Ohio's order was set to expire. On May 3, about 35 physicians, wearing face masks and lab coats, quietly stood in support of Amy Acton. The event was organized by the Physicians Action Network, with participants following social distancing, standing 6 feet apart. Another protest against the stay-at-home order took place May 9, by the group Free Ohio Now.

The only protests outside of the Statehouse took place May 2, at Amy Acton's house in Bexley, an enclave of Columbus. There about 25 people stood on the sidewalk with Ohio and US flags and protest signs, a quieter demonstration than those at the Statehouse. About 10 counterprotesters also arrived, many wearing face masks.

On July 18, several groups protested outside of the Statehouse including anti-mask protesters and Black Lives Matter (BLM) supporters.

=== Reopening efforts and further shutdowns ===
Following Governor Mike DeWine's reopening guidelines in early May, businesses began to reopen. Bars and restaurants could reopen their outdoor dining rooms on May 15. The reopening caused some crowds at the businesses. Unlike many large cities in Ohio and elsewhere, Columbus has not shut down any streets for outdoor dining or otherwise, with the mayor deeming it irresponsibly increasing the likelihood of further coronavirus spread. The Friday, May 15 reopenings caused nine bars and restaurants to violate social distancing requirements, causing each of the businesses to be issued warnings. Standard Hall, a bar in the Short North, was issued multiple citations, after Columbus Public Health received 10 complaints, gave a warning, and returned with Columbus police, to find more violations. The owner refused to sign the citation. The owner commented that he was not given time to break up the crowds before the second citation. His business will remain closed to avoid it being given city-ordered shutdown.

Cases and positivity rates spiked in mid-to-late November, with multiple days of a record-breaking number of cases reported in Ohio. Franklin County issued a 28-day stay-at-home advisory on November 17, warning residents to only leave their homes for work, school, or essentials. Following news of the advisory, the Columbus Metropolitan Library system returned to only offering curbside and walk-up services. The COSI science museum announced it will delay its reopening efforts on November 17. On the same day, Governor DeWine issued a three-week curfew for all Ohioans, from 10 p.m. to 5 a.m. beginning November 19. On November 20, the Columbus Museum of Art and National Veterans Memorial and Museum announced temporary closures due to the increase in cases.

== Cases ==
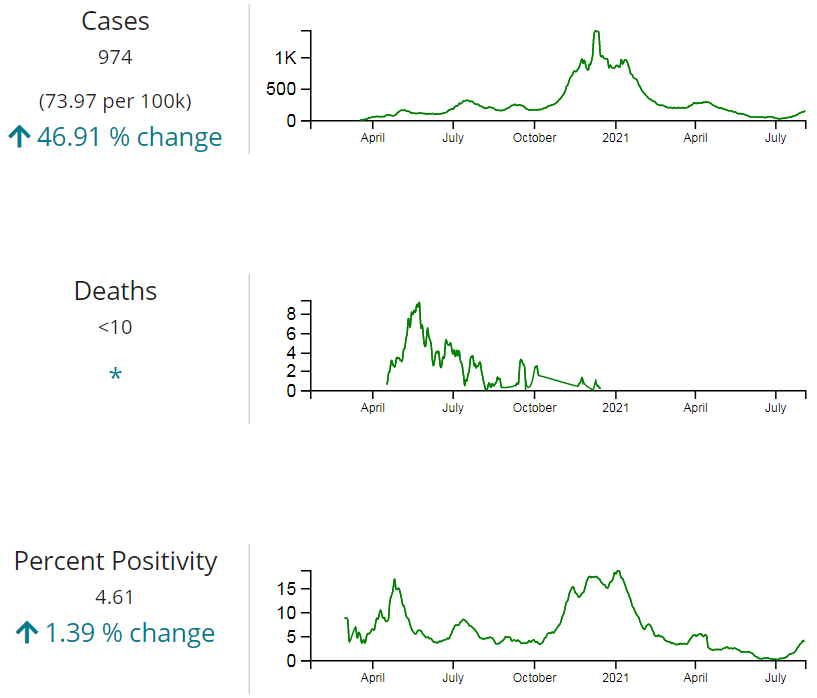
Graph of cases, deaths, and percent positivity change; the left column shows 7-day totals, rates, and percent change

The first case of an infected Columbus resident was reported on March 14. The resident tested positive after returning from a cruise.

On May 12, Columbus was included in a White House Coronavirus Task Force list of cities to watch in a potential spike in coronavirus cases. The city's health commissioner explained that the data used was for all of Central Ohio, including large outbreaks in prisons outside Franklin County.

== Government response and aid efforts ==
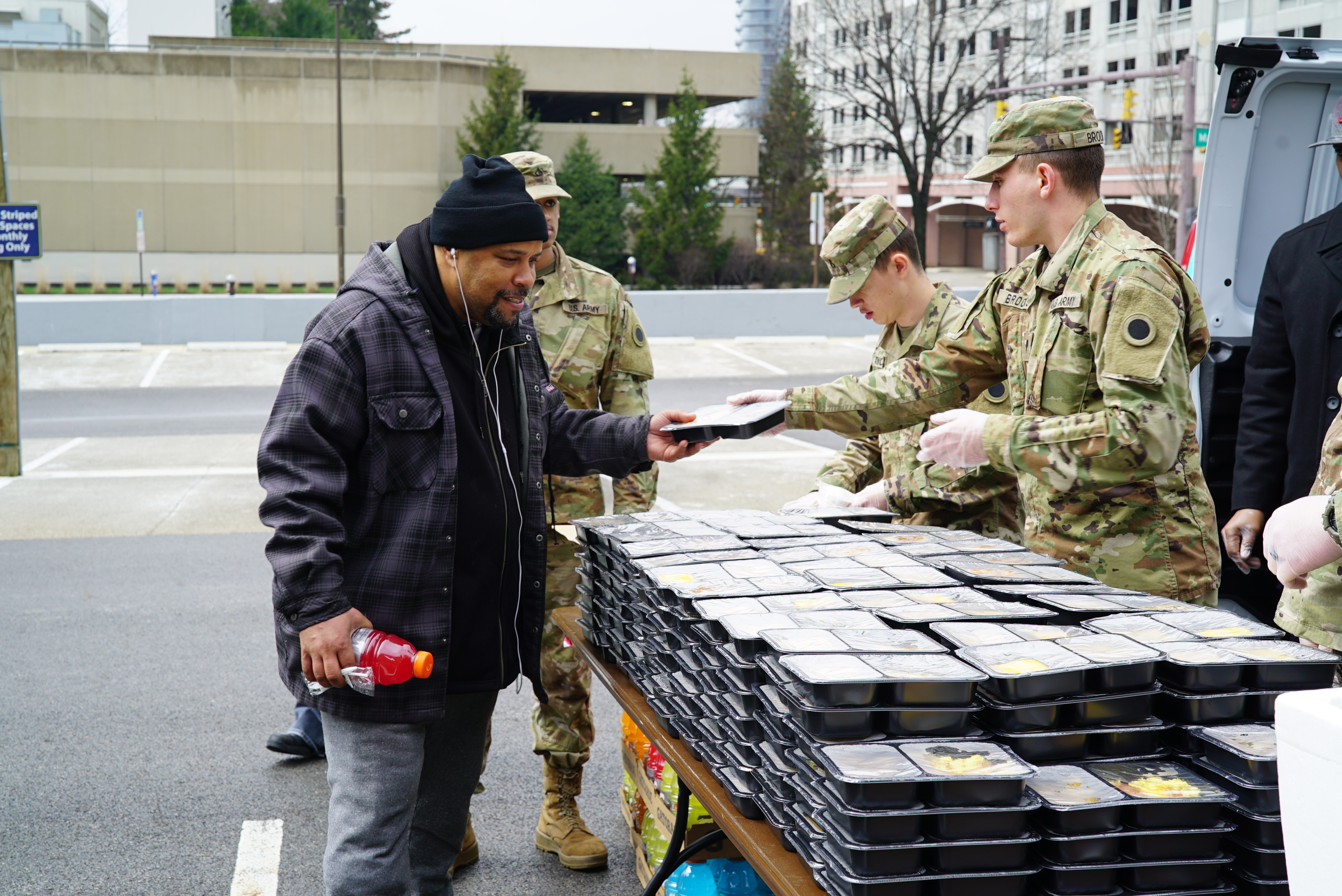
The Ohio National Guard passing out Mid-Ohio Food Bank meals, March 23

2020

- March 13: Columbus's utility department suspends water and power shutoffs to April 15
- March 15: Ohio Department of Job and Family Services expands flexibility for unemployment applications
- March 16: Columbus City Schools creates a map for locations children and teenagers can receive free meals funded by the U.S. Department of Agriculture
- March 17: City Council commits $1 million to support families in need of food or housing
- March 19: City Council expedites funds to local service organizations
- Early April: The City of Columbus, along with the YMCA and Community Shelter Board, open a COVID-19-specific homeless shelter in the city, to house those who are infected and help prevent the spread of the virus.
- November 18: Columbus and Franklin County Public Health announce a stay-at-home advisory. The advisory urges people to only leave home for work or school, or for essential needs like medical care. The advisory is not set to be enforced.
- December 17: Columbus Public Health and Franklin County Public Health extend the Stay-at-Home Advisory until January 2, 2021.

=== Outside sources ===
2020

- March 12: the Columbus Foundation activates a fund for nonprofit organizations
- March 16: local utilities including AEP and Columbia Gas suspend disconnections over nonpayments
- March 17: United Way of Central Ohio launches a fund for local nonprofits
- March 20: Middle West Spirits begins producing hand sanitizer for local EMS and shelters
- April 30: Kroger is beginning drive-through testing at Franklin Park Conservatory, to continue daily until May 2 and twice weekly until May 21
- May 11–15: The Ohio State University Wexner Medical Center is distributing thousands of community-donated care packages to communities in the county. The kits, containing masks, soap, sanitizer, water, dental hygiene supplies, and educational materials, will be passed out in the county's most vulnerable neighborhoods, lower in socioeconomic status and health conditions, making them disproportionately impacted by the coronavirus.

== Economic impact ==
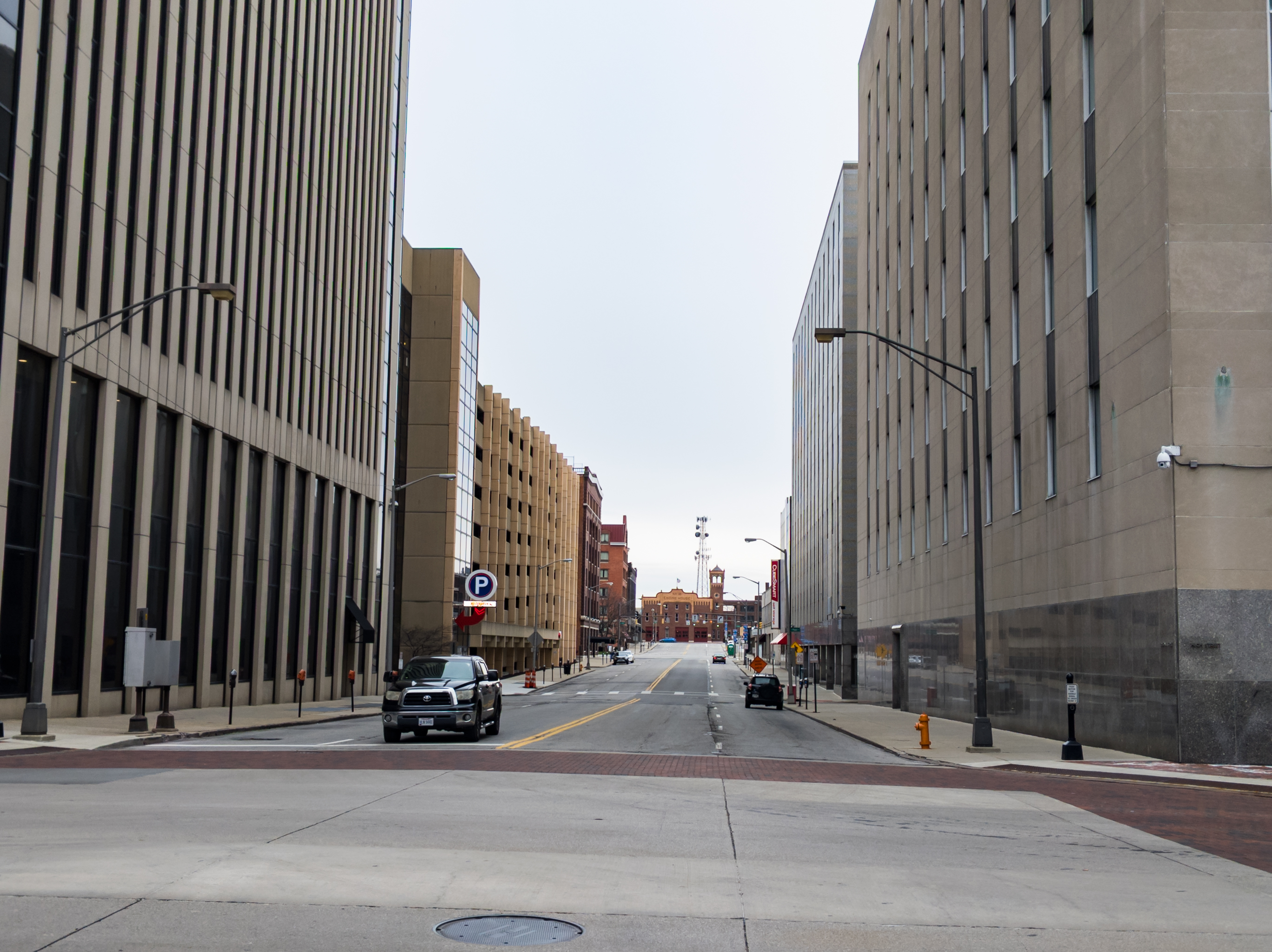
Chestnut Street in Downtown Columbus during the stay-at-home order, March 22

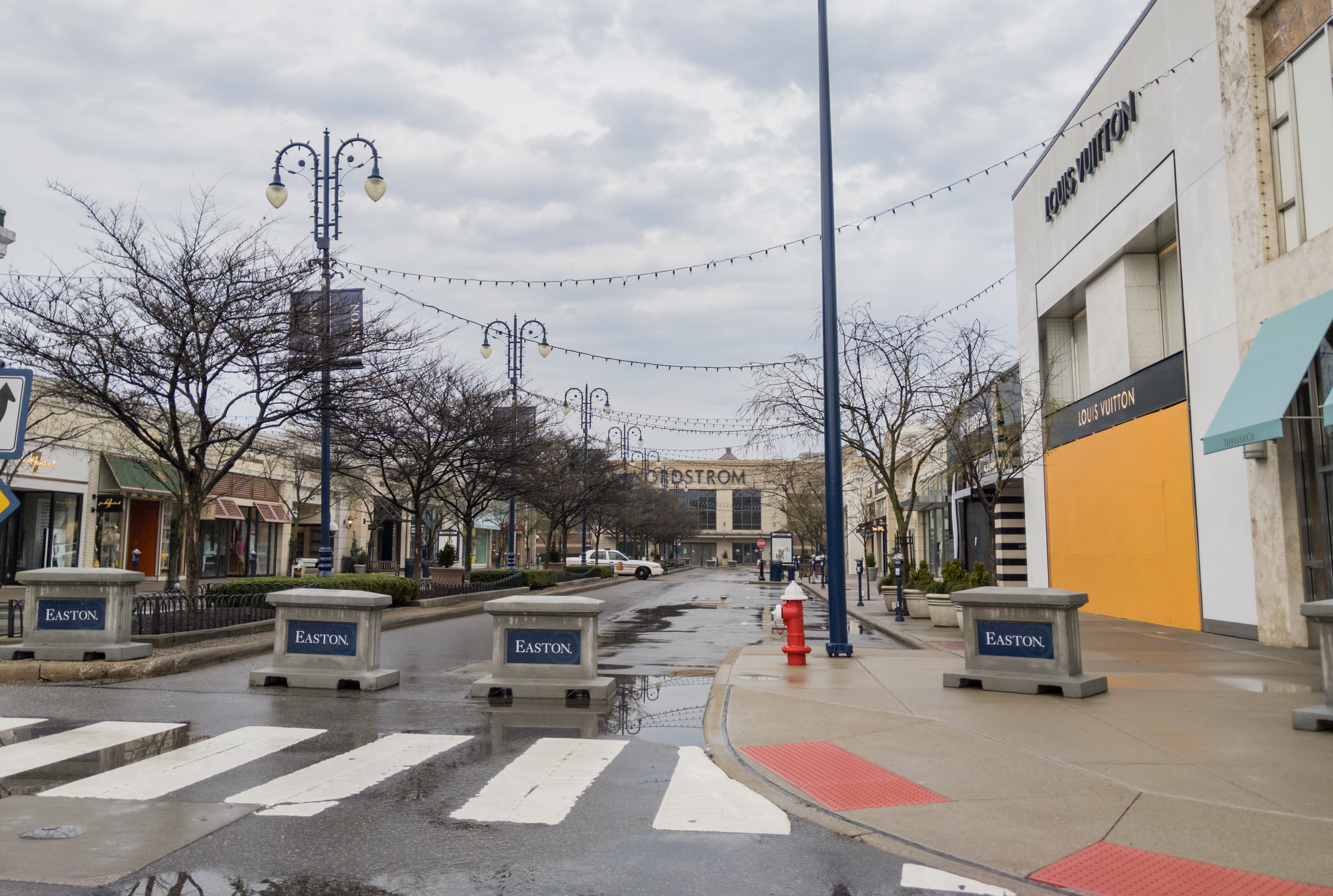
Easton Town Center, a major mall complex during the stay-at-home order in March

Due to the COVID-19 outbreak schools were closed on March 17 and will remain close until May 1. All of Ohio's state playgrounds, cabins, marinas, golf courses and campgrounds have been closed.

Governor Mike DeWine issued a stay at home order for all Ohio's citizens until May 1 with the exception of citizens who provides essential services and has closed all non-essential indoors business like arcades and laser tag.

The COVID-19 outbreak has caused record-breaking levels of unemployment which has caused 187,784 citizens to file for unemployment and by the end of the week ending on March 27 was followed by 272,117.

=== Business closures and event cancellations ===
Cancelled, rescheduled, or made-virtual events in 2020:

- Sonic Temple Art + Music Festival – cancelled
- Columbus Asian Festival – cancelled
- Ohio Black Expo – hosting virtually
- Wicked production in Columbus – postponed, date TBD
- Chris Stapleton concert – postponed, date TBD
- Komen Race for the Cure – postponed, date TBD
- Columbus International Film Festival (April 15–19) – hosted virtually
- Memorial Tournament (June 1–7) – delayed to July 13–19
- Sundays at Scioto (June 7) – cancelled
- WWE Friday Night SmackDown (June 12) – delayed to December 28
- Columbus Arts Festival (June 12–14) – cancelled
- Stonewall Columbus Pride Parade (June 19–20) – cancelled, some virtual activities
- Creekside Blues & Jazz Festival (June 19–21) – cancelled
- Buckeye Country Superfest (June 20) – cancelled
- ComFest at Goodale Park (June 26–28) – delayed to September
- Red, White & Boom! (July 3) – cancelled, some virtual activities
- Columbus Doo Dah Parade (July 4) – delayed to September
- Dublin Fourth of July (July 4) – cancelled
- Journey and The Pretenders concert (July 10)
- Summer Jam West festival (July 11) – cancelled
- Jazz & Rib Fest (July 24–26) – cancelled
- Ohio State Fair (July 29-August 9) – cancelled
- Pelotonia (August 7) – cancelled, some virtual activities
- Dublin Irish Festival (July 31–August 2) – cancelled
- Festival Latino (August 8–9) – cancelled, some virtual activities
- Columbus Food Truck Festival (August 14–15) – cancelled
- Columbus Oktoberfest (September 11–13) – cancelled
- Taste of Italy (October 5) – cancelled
- Columbus Italian Festival (October 9–11) – cancelled
- Columbus Marathon (October 18) – cancelled
- 2021 Columbus Arts Festival (June 11–13) – cancelled
- 2021 Jazz & Rib Fest (July 23–25) – cancelled

==== Film industry and the performing arts ====
Movie theaters, including drive-ins, were ordered closed on March 17. Drive-ins were allowed to reopen on May 12, earlier than most businesses, as they do not carry a risk of spreading the virus.

==== Food service and restaurant industry ====
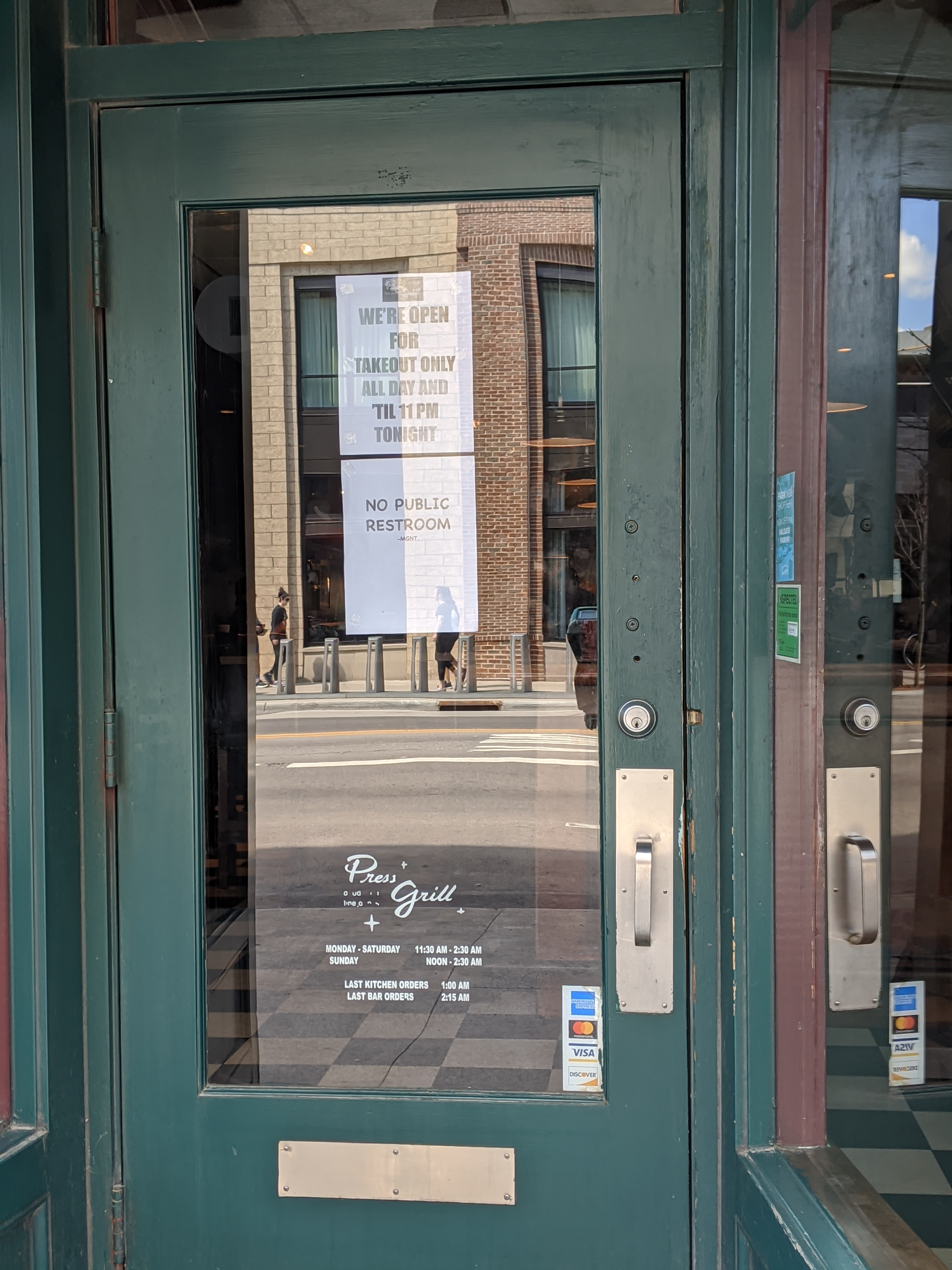
Restaurant open for takeout only, March 29

The city's restaurant industry was impacted by the state's bar and restaurant ban. With all restaurants and bars closed to dining in, many in the area have stayed open for carryout and delivery services. About 175 businesses have been added to "SupportColumbusEats", a website listing restaurant service options and tipping options for unemployed workers. On April 14, FoodFirst Global Restaurants, founded in Columbus and operating a Brio Tuscan Grille in Easton, announced it was filing for bankruptcy and may not reopen any restaurants. The restaurants had been struggling even before the pandemic began. In May, it was reported that most downtown restaurants, though reopen, were suffering from low business volumes. Downtown Columbus still has a small residential population of under 10,000, while upwards of 100,000 people regularly commuted to around the Statehouse for office work. Closed and work-from-home offices have led to significantly reduced foot traffic, causing the downtown location of Jack and Benny's to permanently close, with Andes Bar and Grill considering permanently closing as well.

Other permanently closed foodservice operations include Juniper in the Smith Bros. Hardware Building, The Sycamore, Cosecha Cocina, Little Eater in North Market, Phenix Bistro, Plantain Cafe, Belly Burger, Winking Lizard, two White Castle locations, and three locations of the Max & Erma's chain. Restaurants up for sale include The Table and Elevator Brewing Co. (the brewery and taproom, not the separately-owned restaurant). Several restaurants have ceased expansion plans, including many in the North Market expansion in Dublin, Ohio planned for 2020. By December 2020, over two dozen restaurants in Columbus had permanently closed during the pandemic.

The pandemic has also caused temporary restaurant and bar closures in the city as employees have tested positive for the virus.

One bar, Threes Above High, raised $43,000 to donate to local bar employees.

==== Hospitality industry ====
The hospitality industry also experienced a wave of guest cancellations followed by a decline in bookings. Dock 580, a Columbus-based wedding and event company, permanently closed due to losses in the pandemic.

==== Impact on university and professional sports ====
On August 12, 2020, the Big Ten Conference cancelled its football season, which would have included all of the popular Ohio State Buckeyes football games. This decision was reversed on September 16 when the Big Ten Conference announced that each team would play eight games in eight weeks beginning on October 24.

On November 19, 2020, the Columbus Crew granted 1,500 fans to attend its November 21 soccer game, though hours later, it rescinded the announcement, only allowing family and guests of the staff, coaches, and players to attend. This is the first restriction on fans since September 6.

== Impact on education ==
Due to the pandemic, The Ohio State University and other colleges and universities in the city canceled in-person classes, moving to remote learning for the remainder of the semester. Additionally, with Governor Mike DeWine ordering all K-12 schools across the state to close through May 1, Columbus City Schools moved to remote learning during the closure. Columbus City Schools, along with other area school districts, began meal programs to provide to students under the age of 18.

== Impact on public transport ==
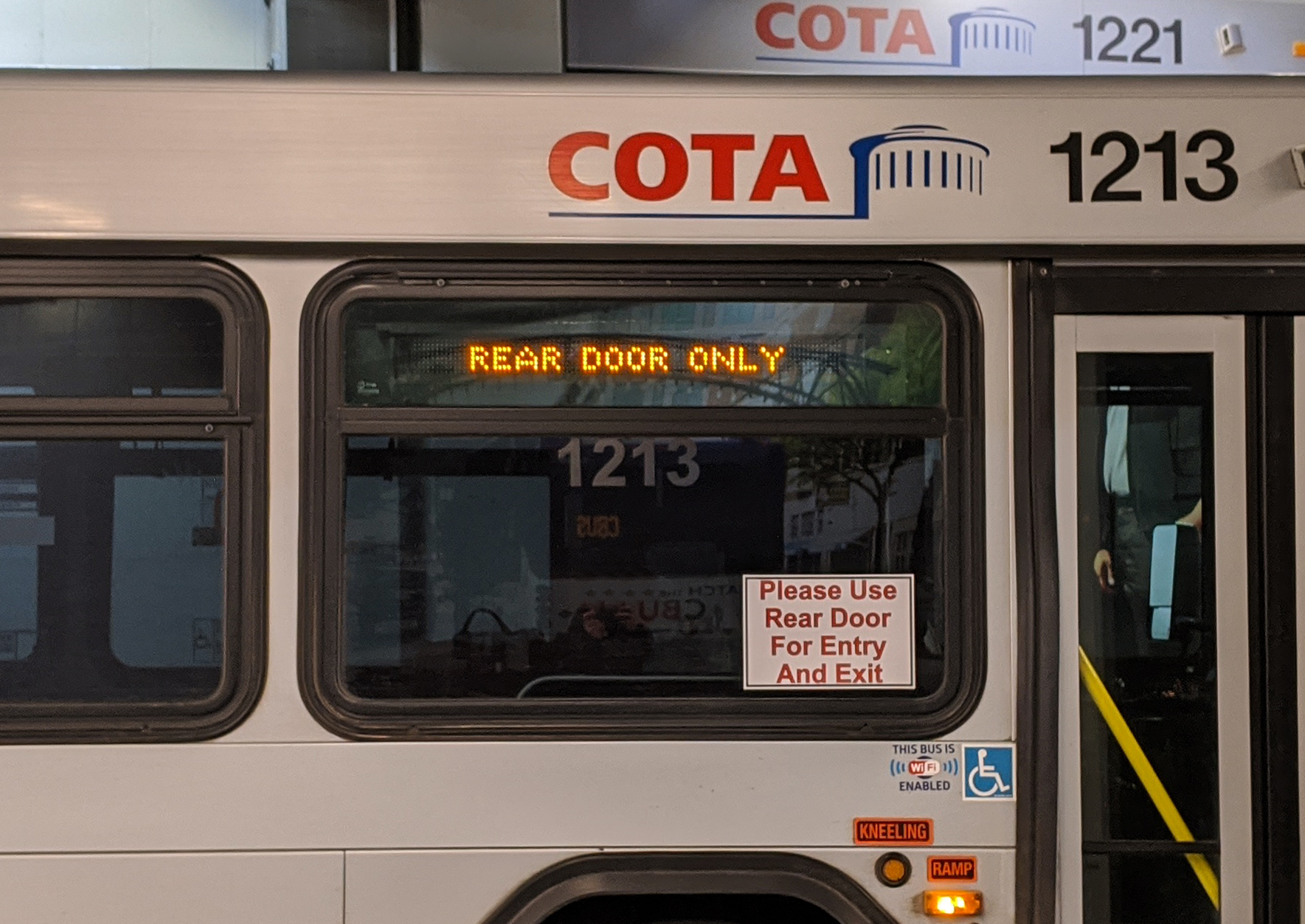
COTA buses notify riders to board using rear doors only

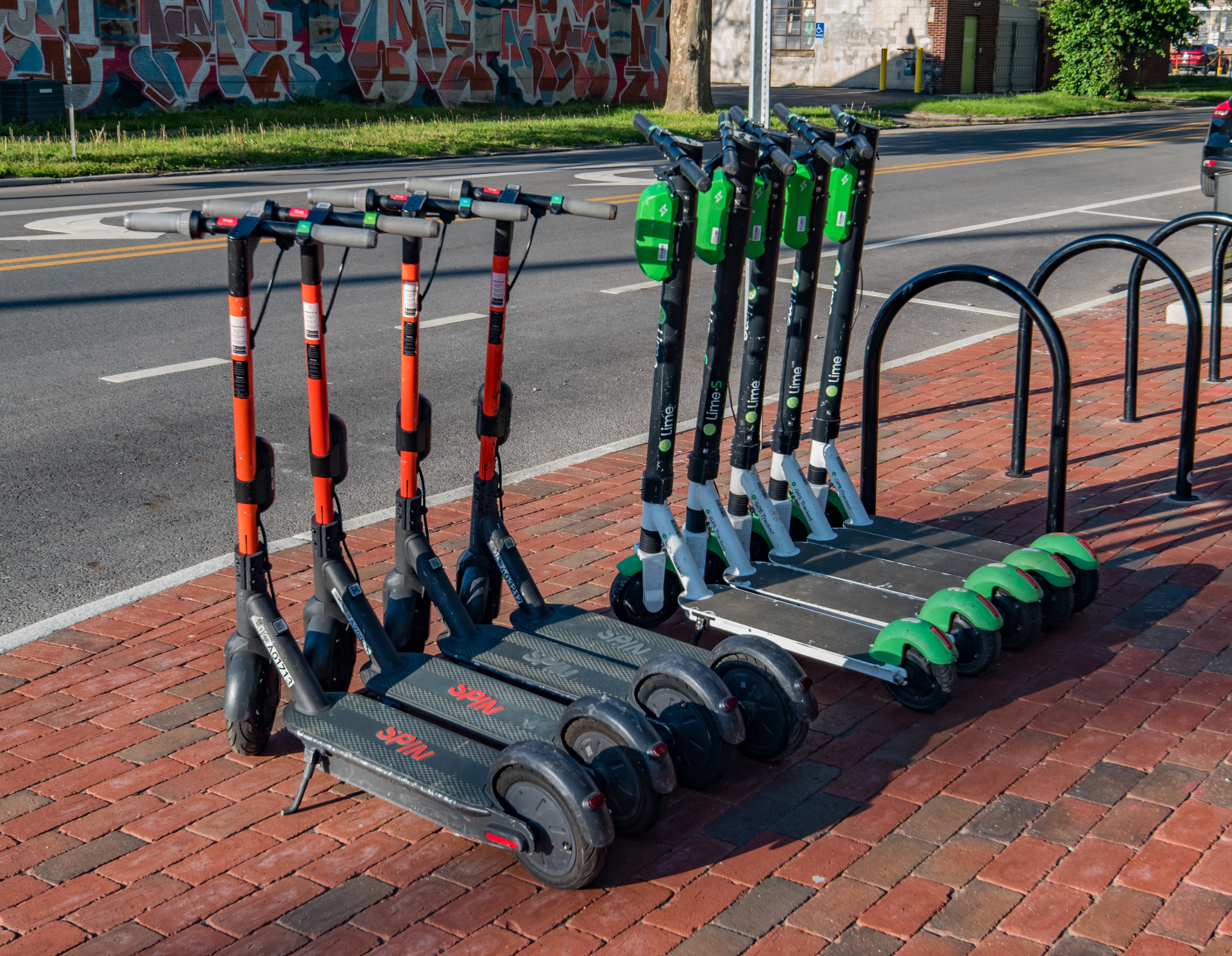
Lime and Spin scooters returned to Columbus streets in late April

In early March, as the pandemic began affecting Ohio, the city's public transit ridership began dropping, approximately 40 percent. Its public transit agency COTA began by introducing thorough cleaning measures, followed by reducing several rush-hour services on March 17. On March 19, it suspended fare collection, making all rides temporarily free, and required passengers to board and depart buses from the rear doors. On the same day, it also modified all rush-hour lines and suspended its AirConnect and Night Owl services. On March 20, the agency recommended only using its services for essential travel; two days later it shut down several rush-hour services and reduced frequencies of nine crosstown lines. On March 24, it stopped all rush-hour services until further notice. On March 26, the agency began "dynamic service" to pick up customers left at bus stops by too-full buses; the agency's current policy is for a maximum of 20 passengers per bus. On March 28, a COTA bus operator tested positive for the disease. On March 30, COTA suspended service on routes 21, 25, and 35. On April 7, a second driver tested positive for the disease. On April 11, the agency announced it will require passengers to wear face masks. On April 27, following further route reductions and a third COTA worker testing positive, it announced all late-night and early hours would be cut, making all services only run from 7 a.m. to 9 p.m. Ridership is down about 65 percent from before the virus. On May 2, as a portion of businesses began to reopen, COTA announced it will resume some early-morning services on May 5.

Columbus's bikeshare program CoGo has continued to operate, with increased cleaning. On May 14, its operator Lyft announced that the bikes will become free to healthcare workers, until at least the end of June.

Bird, Spin, and Lime removed their electric scooters from Columbus streets in mid-March, but Lime scooters returned in late April, with Spin bikes returning about a week later. Lime and Spin's operators are also giving free rides to healthcare workers.

== Impact on religion ==
Churches, along with all other houses of worship, were closed in Ohio as nonessential businesses. Many churches and some synagogues are choosing May 31, the Pentecost, as their first day to reopen. The city synagogues are following national guidelines from the Orthodox Union. Services at most houses of worship will require registering online, wearing masks, and social distancing. Although some houses of worship led virtual services, an Orthodox Jewish synagogue expressed that it was not possible for their congregation, as Orthodox Jews cannot use electricity, including computers and cell phones, on Shabbat.

== Closures ==
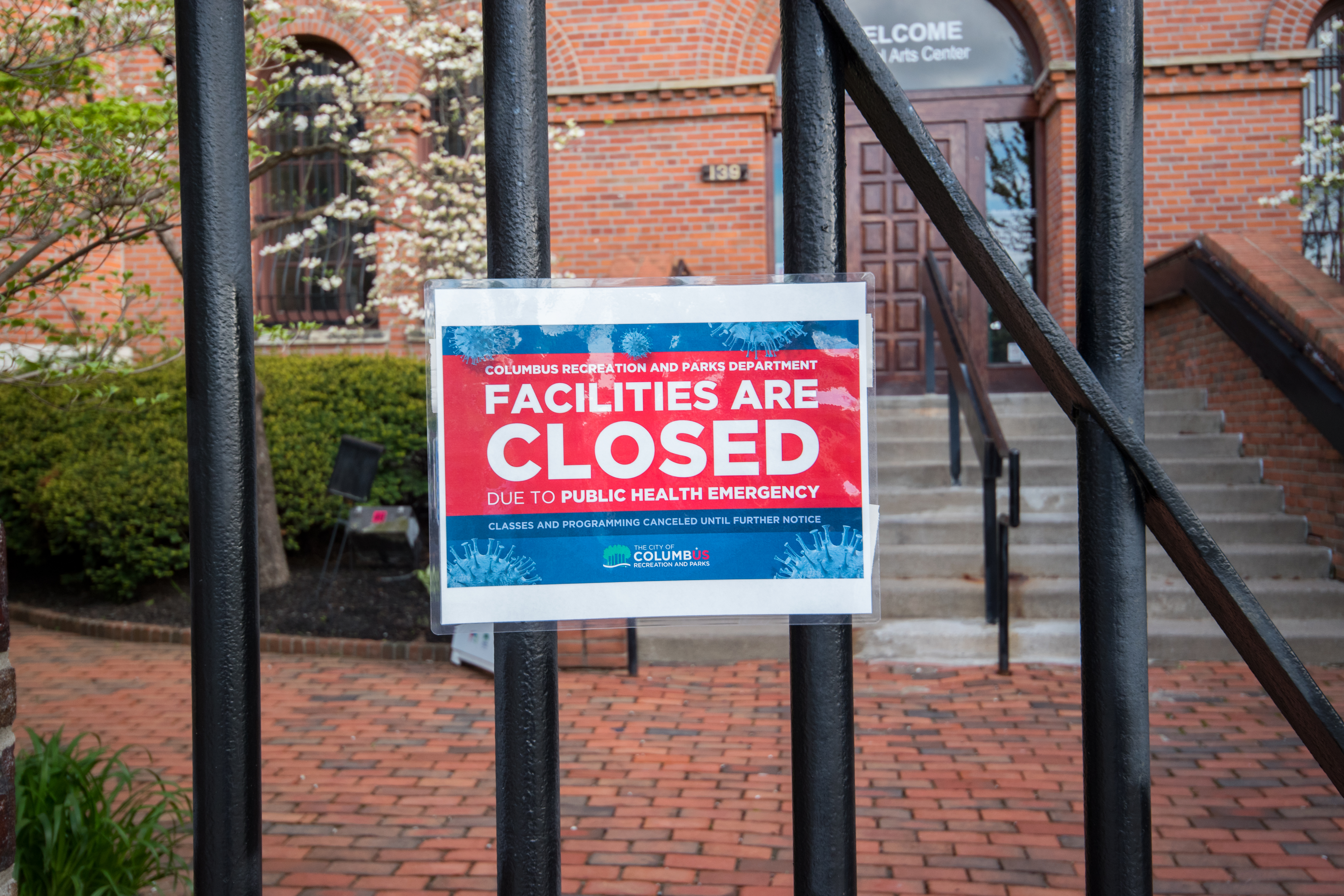
Columbus Recreation and Parks facilities, including the Cultural Arts Center, were closed

2020

- On March 13, Columbus Recreation and Parks closed all locations through April 3, followed by Columbus Metropolitan Library and Columbus Zoo and Aquarium closing all of their locations through April 6.
- Columbus Museum of Art, Franklin Park Conservatory, COSI (Center of Science and Industry), and National Veterans Memorial and Museum also shut their doors with COSI closing through April 3 and the National Veterans Memorial and Museum closing through April 8.
- On March 16, All gyms, fitness centers, movie theaters, bowling alleys, public recreation centers, indoor water parks and trampoline parks followed by Hollywood Casino are closed.
- On March 18, BMV closes a majority of its locations (180 locations) but still operating 5 of its locations. Salons, spas, barbershops, nail salons, and tattoo parlors are closed as well.
- On March 20, Columbus Idea Foundry lays off all of its workers, including CEO Casey McCarty.
- On March 25, Gateway Film Center lays off a majority of workers due to COVID-19.
- On April 1, the YMCA also lays off a majority of its workers.
- On April 3, Hocking Hills State Park became the first Ohio state park to close due to COVID-19.

== Notable cases ==
- Franklin County Commissioner Kevin Boyce – hospitalized
- State Senator for Ohio District 3 Tina Maharath – twice infected
- State Representative for Ohio District 68 Rick Carfagna

== See also ==
- George Floyd protests in Columbus, Ohio, happening during the pandemic
