= Columbus Pride =

LGBTQ festival in Columbus, Ohio, US

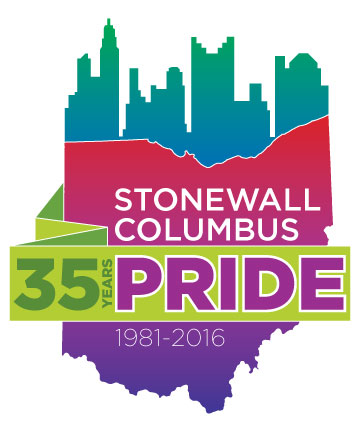
- 2016 logo
- Status: Active
- Genre: Festivals
- Frequency: Annually
- Location: Columbus, Ohio
- Country: United States
- Years active: 44–45
- Inaugurated: 1981
- Website: columbuspride.org

Columbus Pride (or Stonewall Columbus Pride Parade) is an LGBTQ festival in Columbus, Ohio, hosted by Stonewall Columbus. The event first took place in 1981, and has grown into the second largest LGBT pride event in the Midwest, behind Chicago. The pride parades typically include marching bands, firetrucks, motorcycles, and floats covered in rainbow flags or balloons.

== History ==
The city's first pride parade took place in 1981, and it drew roughly 200 people. Several of the attendees were afraid of marching so publicly, and they wore bags over their heads, so they could hide their identities.

Early pride parades in Columbus were met with anti-LGBTQ protesters. This includes the 1983 event, when demonstrators attributed HIV/AIDS to homosexuality. Additionally, two protesters tore down a pride flag from the Ohio Statehouse and burned it in 1999. The two were charged with riot and disorderly conduct and criminal damaging. In 2001, one of them subsequently returned and burned another pride flag during Columbus Pride.

In 2017, a controversy arose when four protesters were arrested during the Columbus Pride parade. Members of the community called for the organization's leadership to resign. Instead, the executive director of Stonewall Columbus retired in the following year.

In 2014, Stonewall Columbus estimated the event had over 300,000 participants. By 2018, the event rivaled Chicago in attendance. In 2019, Columbus Pride hosted roughly 500,000 people, which at the time made it the city's largest pride festival to date. During the COVID-19 pandemic, the 2020 parade was postponed and ultimately canceled. Organizers moved to virtual events that took place later in the year. In 2023, the event hosted over 700,000 people, becoming the largest Columbus Pride parade to date.

== Notable appearances ==
Several notable people have appeared at this event in recent years. For instance, organizers hosted actor George Takei in 2014 and Jim Obergefell, of Obergefell v. Hodges, in 2015. More recently, Carmen Carrera, who is a transgender actress, was the event's "Patron of Pride" in 2022. Transgender rights activist Rhea Debussy was one of the "Icons of Pride" for the event in 2023. In 2023 musical artist Trey Pearson performed at the event.
