= Fifth Avenue and North High Historic District =

Historic district in Ohio, United States

- U.S. National Register of Historic Places
- U.S. Historic district
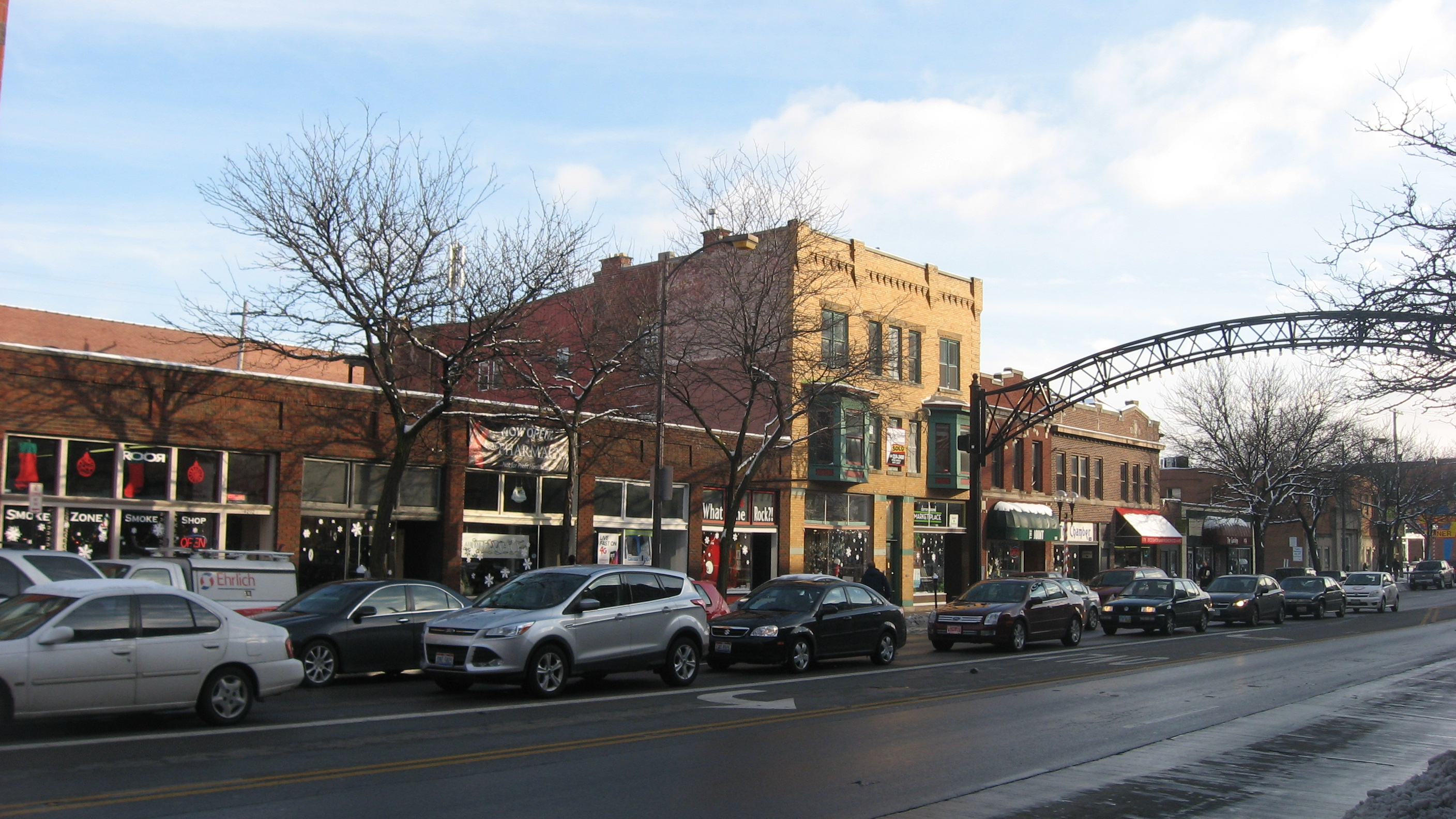
- Interactive map
- Location: N. High St. roughly between 4th Ave. and Clark Pl., Columbus, Ohio
- Coordinates: 39.986944°N 83.005°W
- Architectural style: Late 19th and early 20th century American movements
- MPS: Short North MPS
- NRHP reference No.: 90000584
- Added to NRHP: April 19, 1990

The Fifth Avenue and North High Historic District is a historic district in the Short North neighborhood of Columbus, Ohio. It was listed on the National Register of Historic Places in 1990. The site consists of 24 buildings, including three that are non-contributing. Most are two-to-three story commercial brick buildings built between 1888 and 1930.

== See also ==
- National Register of Historic Places listings in Columbus, Ohio
