= Third Avenue and North High Historic District =

Historic district in Ohio, United States

- U.S. National Register of Historic Places
- U.S. Historic district
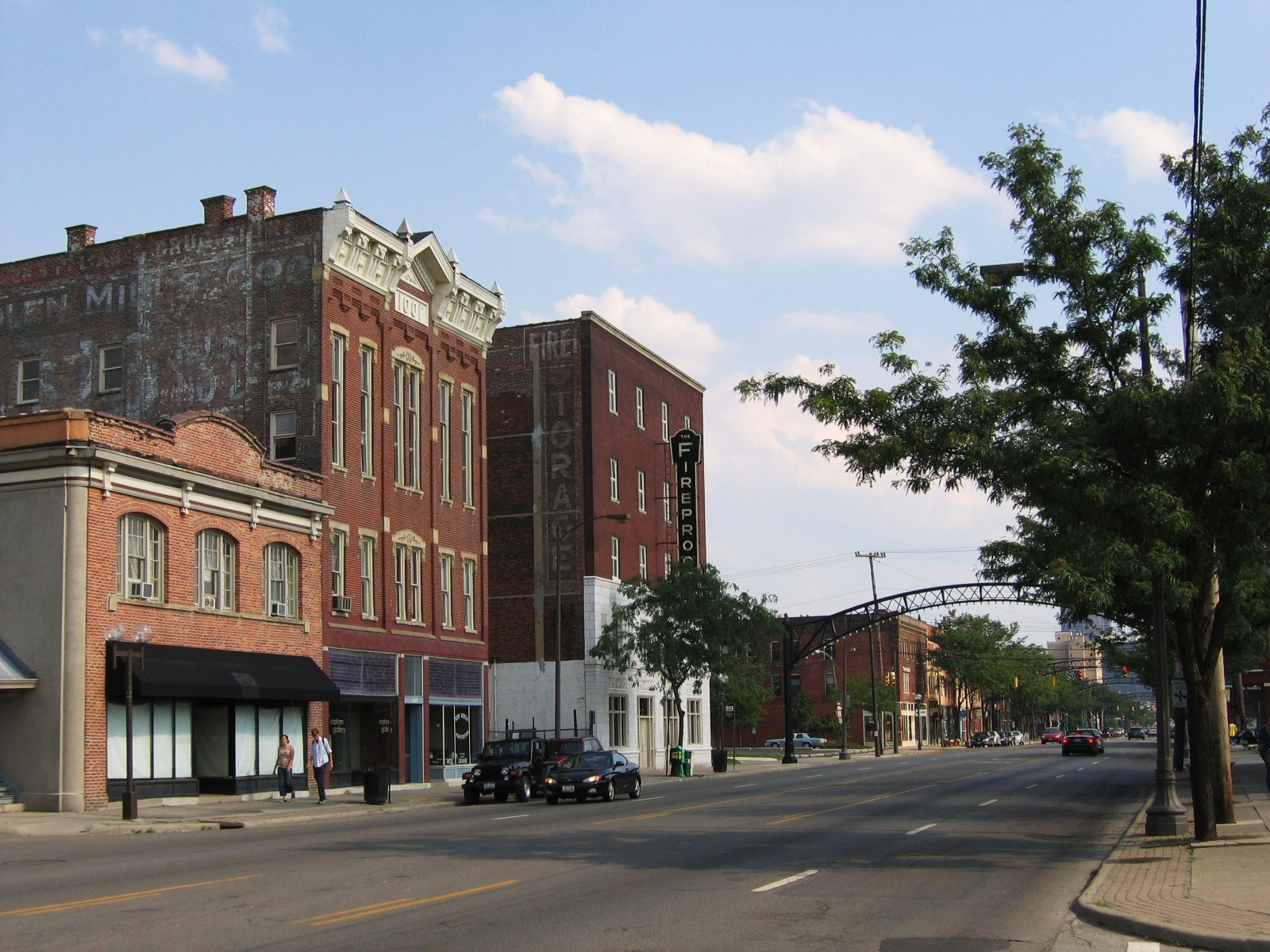
- Interactive map
- Location: N. High St. in the vicinity of 2nd and 3rd, Columbus, Ohio
- Coordinates: 39.983056°N 83.004722°W
- Architectural style: Late 19th and early 20th century American movements
- MPS: Short North MPS
- NRHP reference No.: 90000585
- Added to NRHP: April 19, 1990

The Third Avenue and North High Historic District is a historic district in the Short North neighborhood of Columbus, Ohio. It was listed on the National Register of Historic Places in 1990. The site consists of 24 buildings, including six that are non-contributing. Most are commercial or multifamily residential brick buildings built between 1900 and 1920.

== Gallery ==
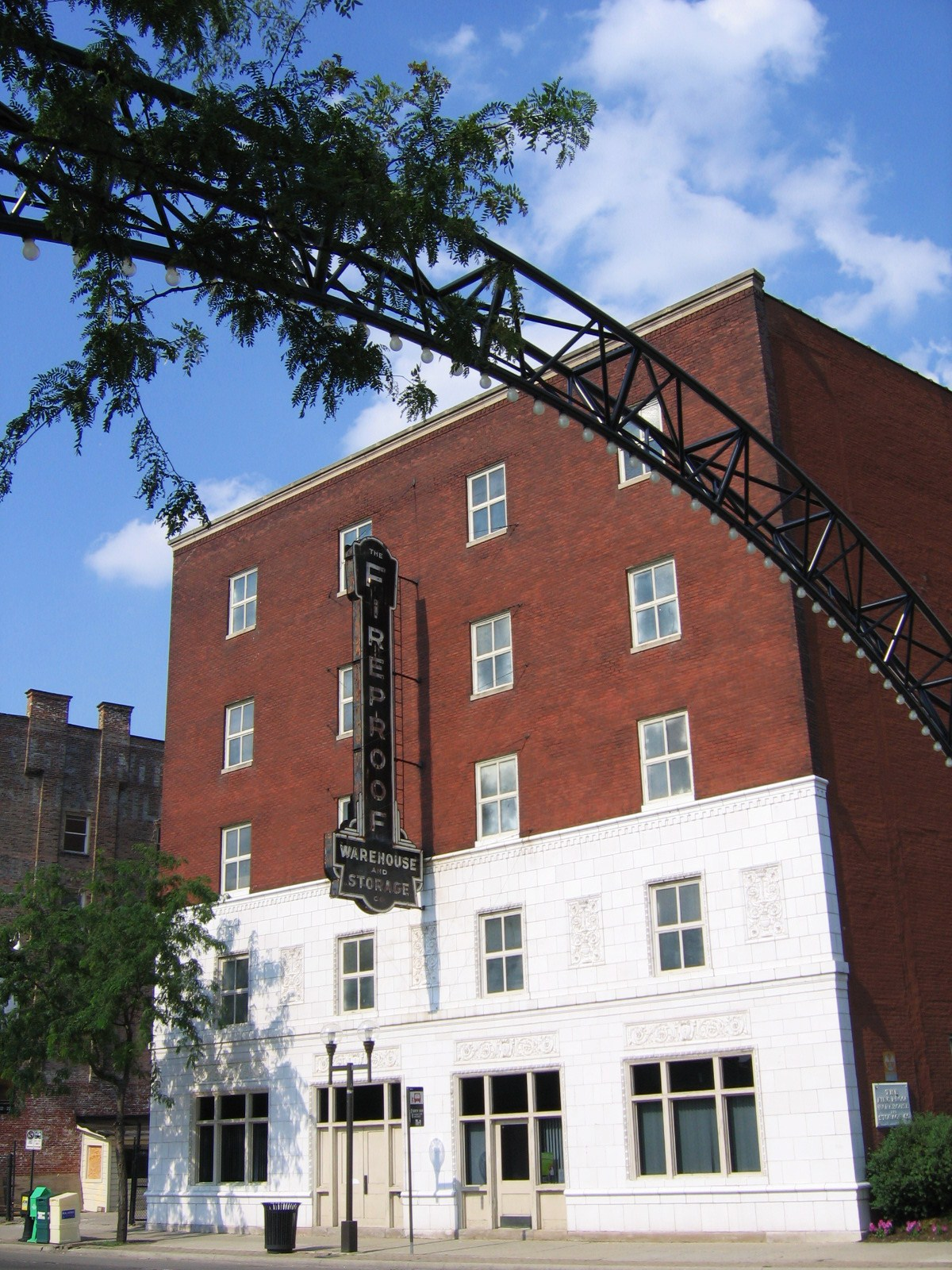
1024 N. High

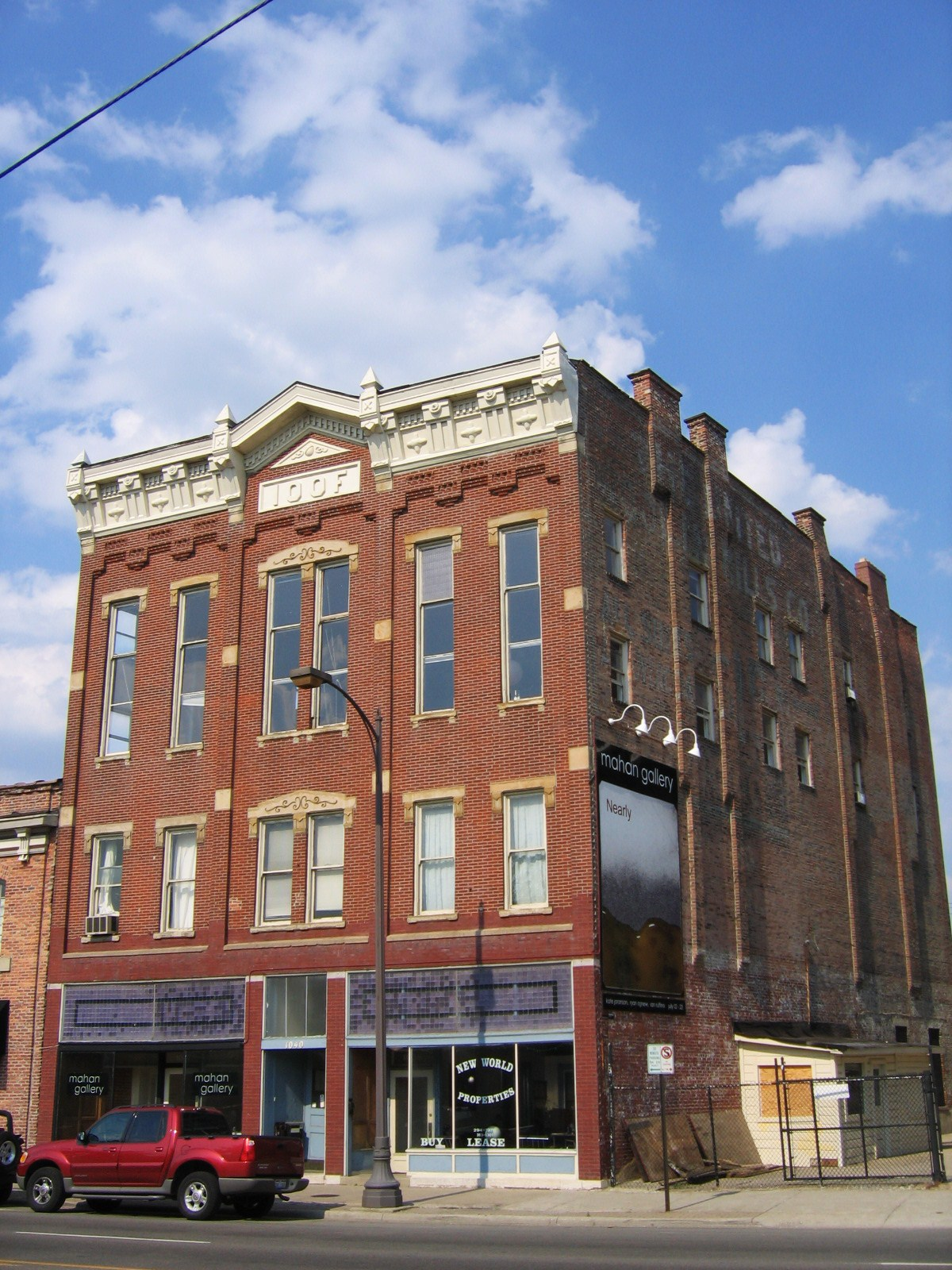
1040 N. High

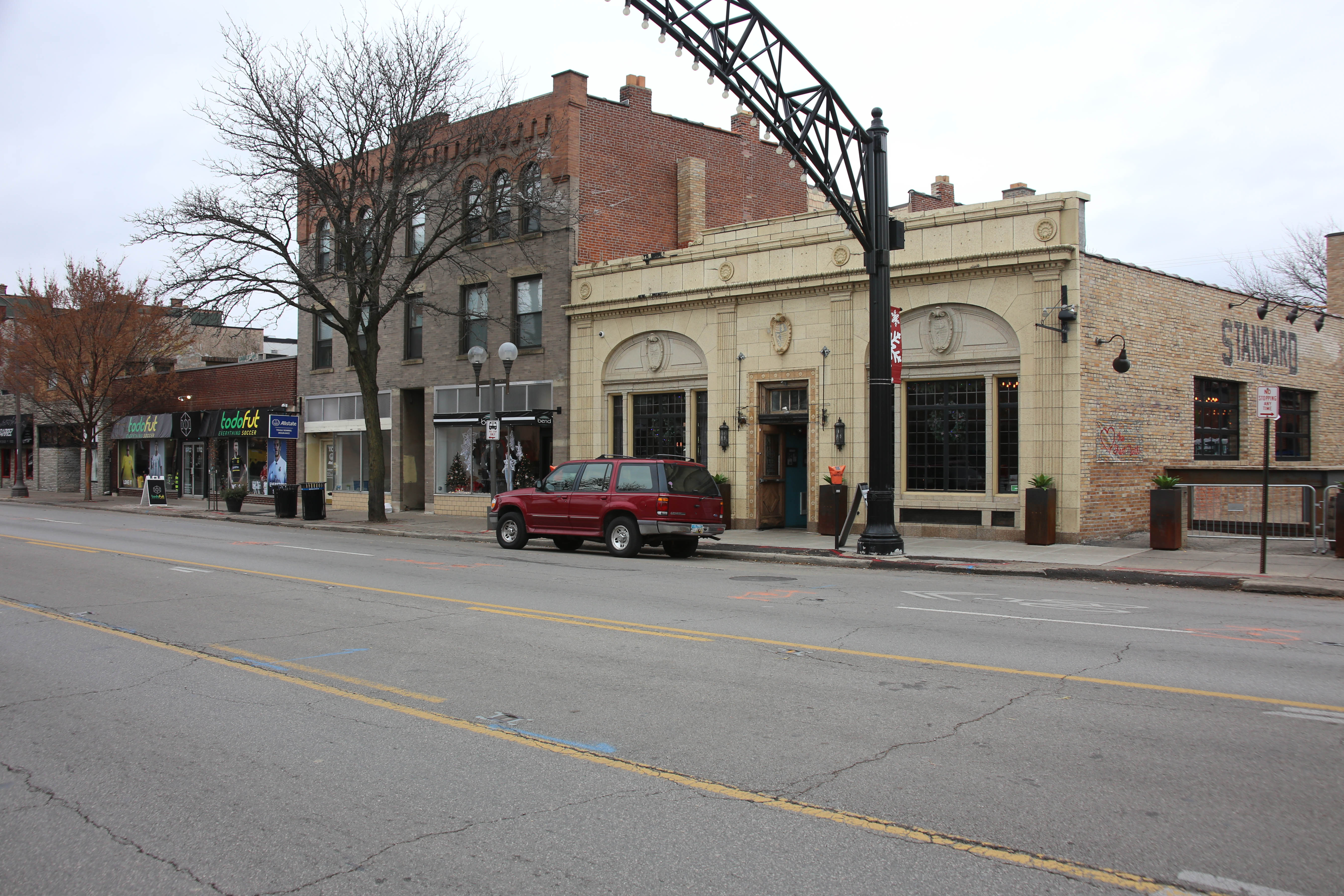
1100 and 1108 N. High

== See also ==
- National Register of Historic Places listings in Columbus, Ohio
