= Columbus streetcar arches =

Street arches used in Columbus, Ohio

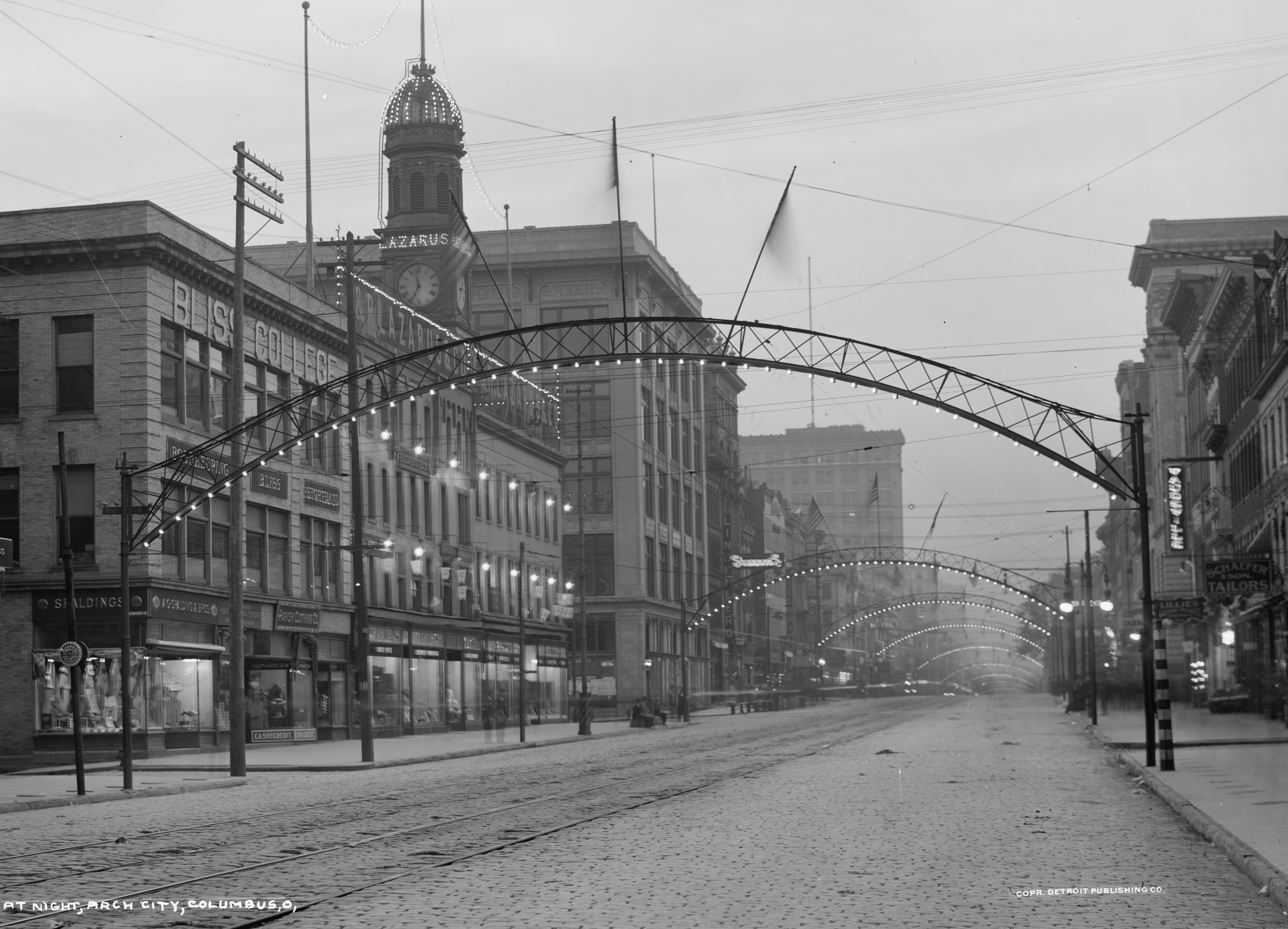
Streetcar arches at night on South High Street in Columbus, early 20th c.

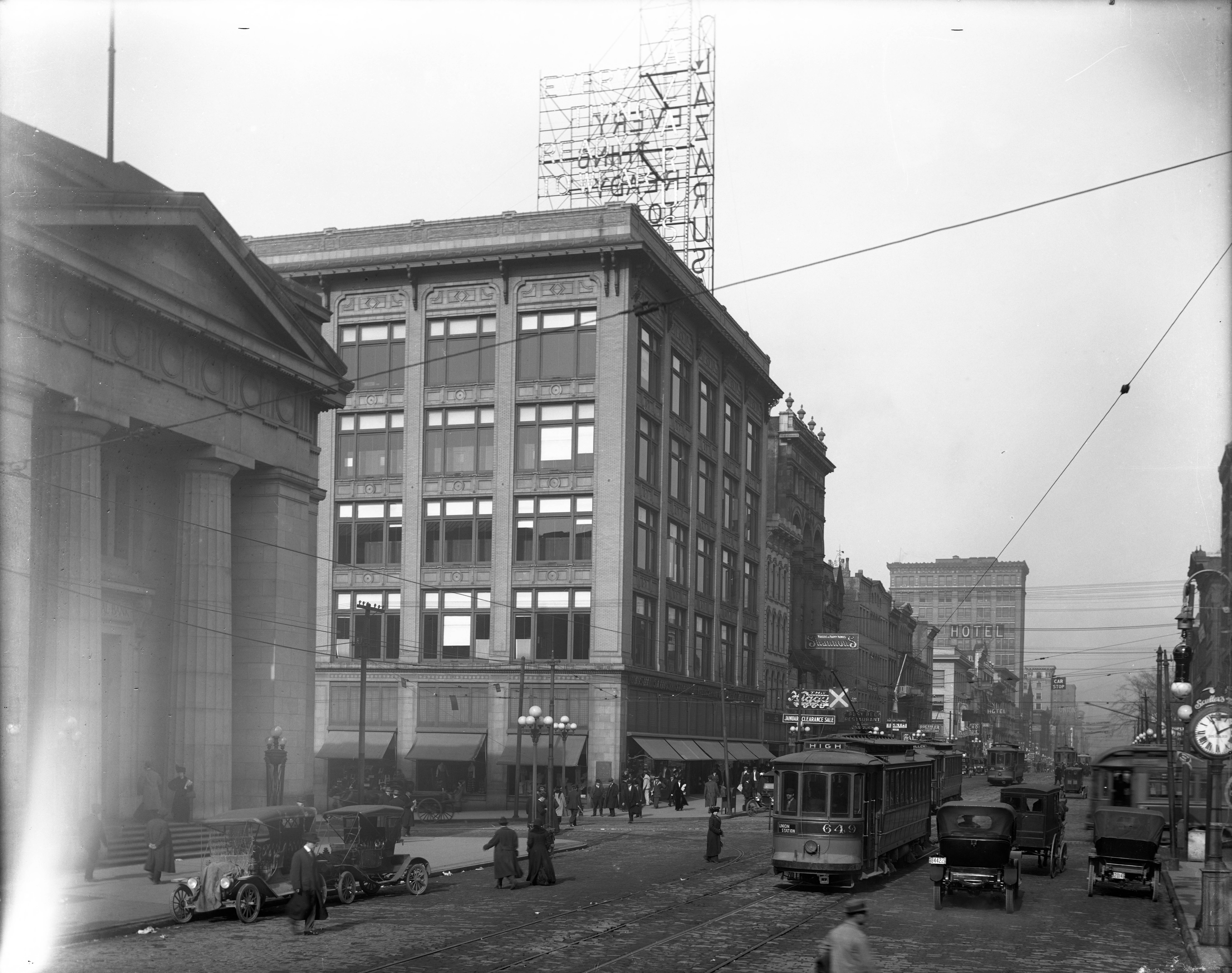
A similar view, c. 1913, after arches were removed from South High Street

Columbus, Ohio has a legacy of using wooden and metal arches on its urban streets. Initially installed in 1888 for lighting during a national Grand Army of the Republic convention, the arches or more permanent replacements were placed on city streets until around 1914, used as overhead lines for electric streetcar wires, until more conventional poles became more favorable. Modern-day arches were installed in the city's Short North neighborhood in 2002, in an effort to unify the district, draw visitors, and increase business sales.

== History ==
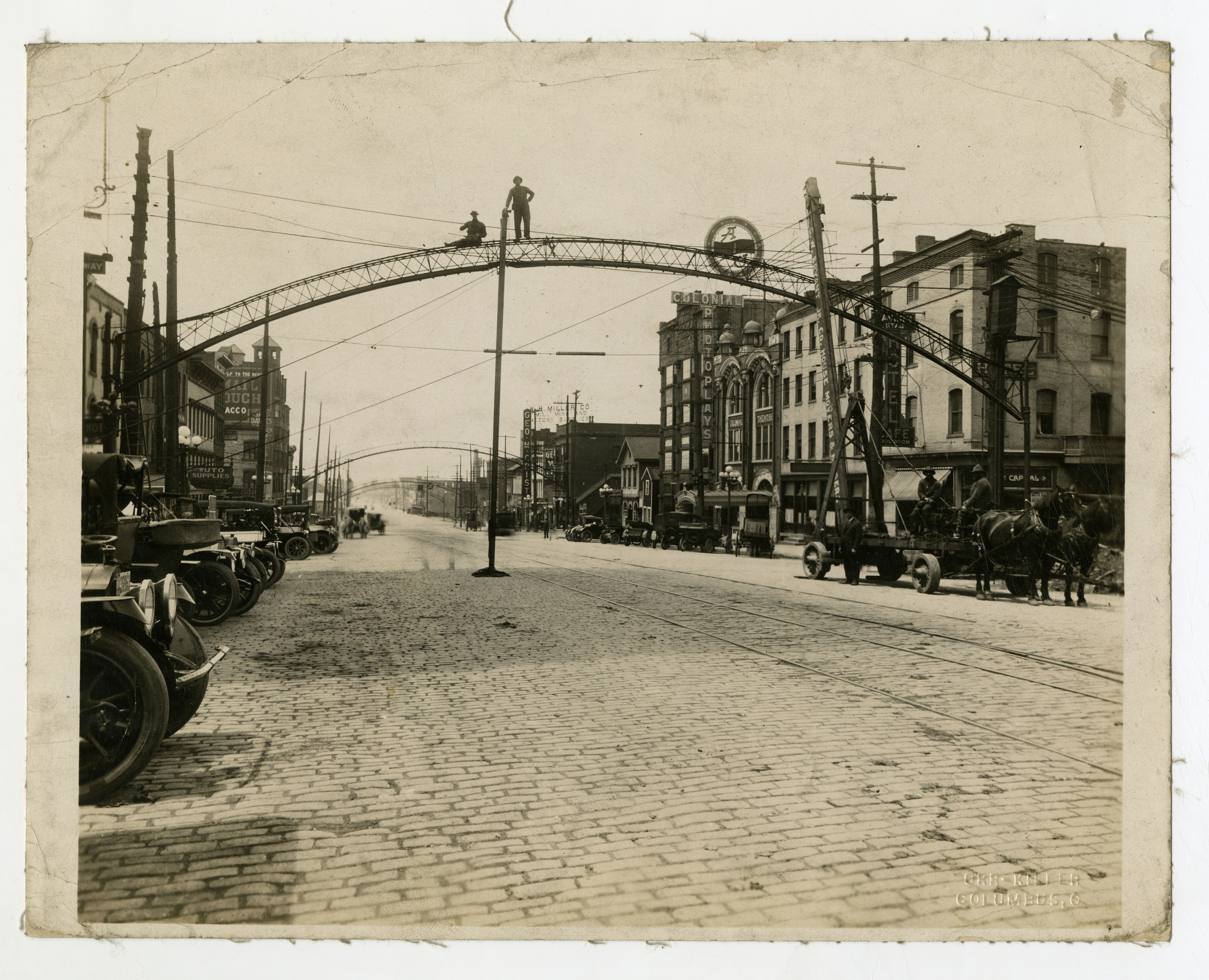
Taking down a streetcar arch at Broad and Wall streets, 1915

Arches were first used on streets in Columbus in 1888. The Grand Army of the Republic (G.A.R.), a national veterans organization, held its 22nd annual convention in the city that year, bringing about 250,000 people to the city that had held a population of about 90,000. Tent cities were put up around Columbus, so the city erected 25 wooden arches, gas-lit, to support their safety and security at night. The arches spanned High Street for about 7,400 ft (2,300 m), from Union Station south to Livingston Avenue. The event also included a parade of 90,000 veterans down High Street, the largest for Union soldiers since the Civil War. The parade route passed under numerous of these arches on High Street.

After the G.A.R. convention, the arches remained installed on city streets to memorialize the significant event. Within several years, the city's prominent horse-driven streetcar companies consolidated. The new Columbus Railway, Power & Light Company looked for a way to power new electric streetcars, and constructed a network of arches in Downtown Columbus in 1896. One section of the city, "the Hub" around Fourth and Main Streets, had a smaller system of arch lighting.

By the early 1900s, the city became known as "Arch City" due to the streetcar arches' popularity and prevalence, as defined as the "Twin Cities" of Minneapolis-St. Paul and the "City of Brotherly Love", Philadelphia.

Initially, the arches were only used in high-traffic areas, mostly in Downtown Columbus, with other areas using freestanding wires. Residents of other neighborhoods soon wished to have streetcar arches, as they had become the single clearest identifier for the city, something other neighborhoods wanted to partake in. The electric company to say it would provide power so long as the residents provide the arches. Efforts to raise money for arches in Columbus neighborhoods were often unsuccessful, but businesses in the Short North raised enough from 1907 to 1908 to place arches along High Street for a stretch. Within one year, businessmen on Broad Street west from High to the Toledo & Ohio station raised funds for their own arches. These were dedicated in a ceremony of parades, speeches, and fireworks on July 7, 1909.

As early as 1911, city residents began to favor more conventional street lights, and so most streetcar arches were removed from Downtown Columbus by 1914.

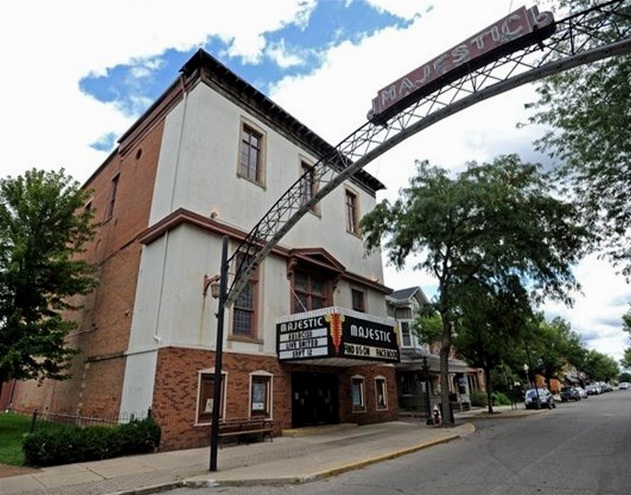
Early Columbus streetcar arch preserved at the Majestic Theatre in Chillicothe

In the 1990s, in an attempt to unify the Short North district and draw customers to the area, a real estate executive proposed the installation of new streetcar arches resembling the historical set. Seventeen were built, lining High Street from I-670 north to just past Fifth Avenue, with a cost of $2.2 million. The first of the new arches were lit on December 4, 2002. These were complemented by similar arches elsewhere in the city, including at the Lennox Town Center shopping complex.

One arch remains from the metal series installed on High Street in 1896, intact on Second Street outside the Majestic Theatre in Chillicothe, Ohio. The theater owner purchased and installed the arch in 1907.

== Attributes ==
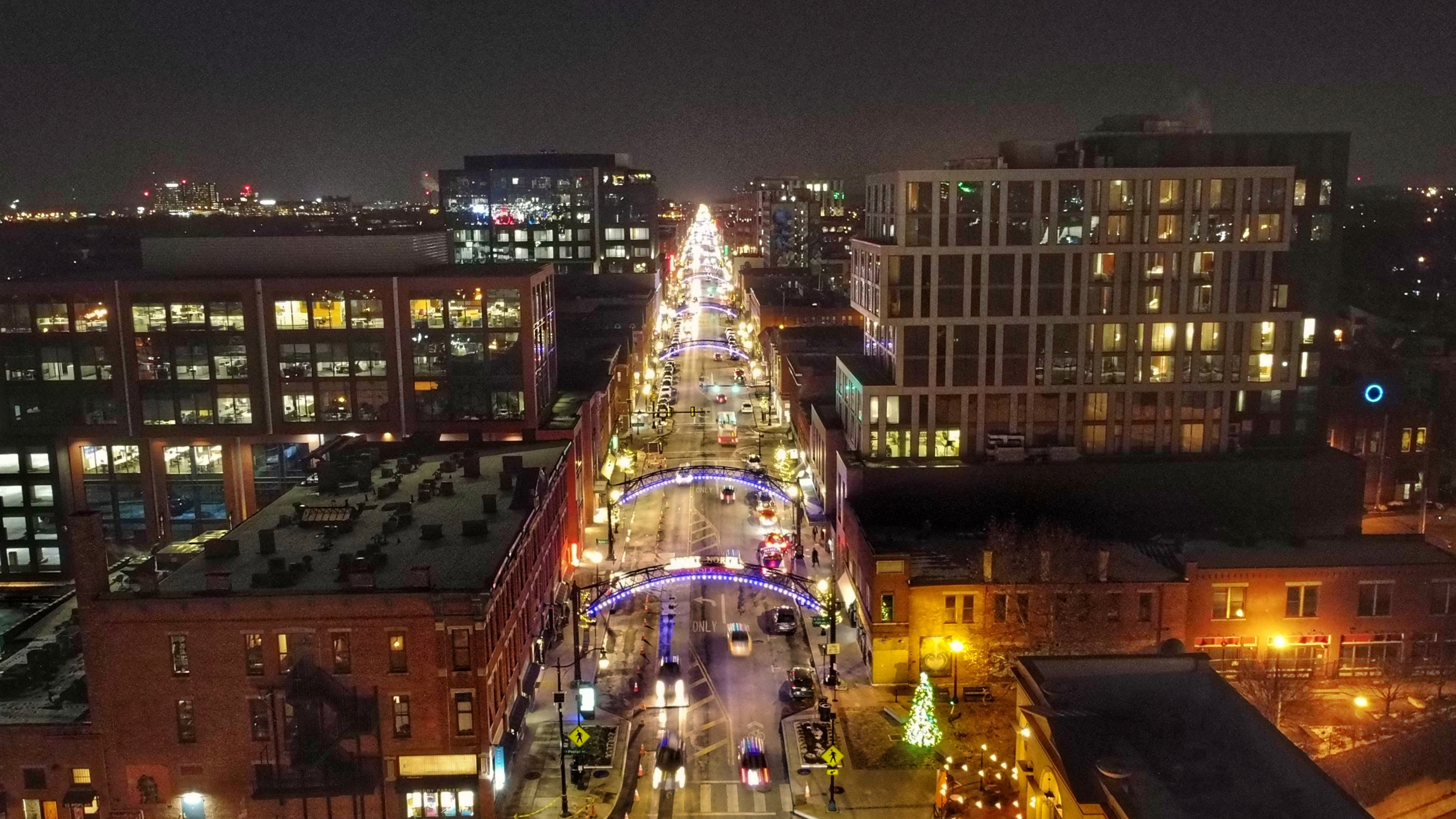
Modern-day arches lit in the Short North at night in 2020

The first arches, used to light areas during the Grand Army of the Republic convention, were made of wood and used gas lighting. The arches installed in 1896 were of metal, with electric lights. They became used to support electric streetcars' overhead lines. They were illuminated at night, providing a luminous glow especially in wet or icy conditions.

The modern arches in the Short North line High Street from I-670 north to just past Fifth Avenue. They are 28 feet tall and 57 to 69 feet wide, depending on the street width. They have optical fibers to transmit lights to their glass globes, rather than using individual light bulbs. The modern method prevents individual burn-outs and allows for even lighting.
