= Rhea Debussy =

American academic and transgender activist

- Born: 1991/1992; Columbus, Georgia, U.S.
- Other name: Dorian Rhea Debussy
- Known for: Transgender rights activism

Academic background
- Education: Columbus State University (BA), University of Oxford (Certificate), University of Connecticut (MA), and University of Connecticut (PhD)

Academic work
- Discipline: Political Science, Women's Studies
- Sub-discipline: American politics, American foreign policy, security studies, LGBTQ history
- Institutions: Ohio State University (current), formerly Kenyon College and University of Connecticut
- Notable works: The Lavender Bans: A Century of Anti-LGBTQ+ Policies in the US Military from Columbia University Press

Rhea Debussy, usually cited as Dorian Rhea Debussy, is an American academic and transgender rights activist. She is best known for work related to LGBTQ health, transgender people and military service, and transgender people in sports.

In 2022, she gained national attention for resigning from the NCAA in protest to an updated transgender participation policy. In 2026, Debussy's book, The Lavender Bans: A Century of Anti-LGBTQ+ Policies in the US Military, was published by Columbia University Press.

== Early life and education ==
Debussy grew up in a military family in Columbus, Georgia, near Fort Benning. As an undergraduate, she attended Columbus State University and studied abroad at the University of Oxford. She earned her master's degree and PhD in political science at the University of Connecticut.

After completing her doctorate in 2018, Debussy accepted a position leading LGBTQ work at Kenyon College. She came out as transgender during this time.

== Career ==
=== Kenyon College ===
In 2018, Debussy began working for the Office of Diversity, Equity, and Inclusion at Kenyon College, leading LGBTQ programs and initiatives. While there, Debussy organized the college's inaugural queer and transgender studies conference in spring 2019. With more than 15 academic institutions participating, it was the largest LGBTQ+ student conference in the state of Ohio.

=== NCAA ===
While at Kenyon College, Debussy became one of the first people to be trained as a facilitator for the NCAA LGBTQ OneTeam Program. By fall 2019, Debussy had led several training sessions, including at Denison University and Kenyon College.

In spring 2021, a group of NCAA Division III coaches — led by Debussy and along with the Human Rights Campaign — published an open letter advocating for the rights of transgender people in sports. In 2022, Debussy critiqued changes to the NCAA's transgender policy. Through a statement with Athlete Ally, she, in protest, publicly resigned from her role with NCAA Division III athletics. Following an interview with Sports Illustrated, this drew national and international attention.

=== Equitas Health ===
Currently, Debussy leads public policy and advocacy work for Equitas Health, an LGBTQ community health center. Debussy has spoken publicly about access to HIV/AIDS focused care, the Food and Drug Administration's blood donation policy for gay and bisexual men, the federal government's distribution of monkeypox vaccines, reproductive rights, and birth control.

Debussy criticized the Ohio General Assembly, after the passage of a gender affirming care ban for youth. Following Governor Mike DeWine's proposed restrictions on gender affirming care for adults in Ohio, Debussy publicly criticized the proposal and the governor. More recently, Debussy has critiqued changes to the Suicide and Crisis Lifeline and attempts to restrict transgender rights.

=== Other LGBTQ activism ===
Debussy's transgender rights activism has continued both in Ohio and nationally. In 2022, the Ohio General Assembly debated bills to ban transgender athletes, and Debussy has opposed these bills. Nationally, Debussy joined GLAAD and other LGBTQ activists in signing a letter that criticized transgender coverage at The New York Times in 2022.

More recently, she has spoken about the national rise in anti-trans legislation, including attempts to restrict gender affirming care for adults and to discharge transgender personnel in the United States military.

== Honors and recognition ==
When affiliated with the North Coast Athletic Conference of the NCAA, Debussy was a finalist for the NCAA Division III's inaugural LGBTQ Staff/Administrator/Coach of the Year Award in 2021. In 2022, Debussy was announced as a finalist for the same NCAA award.

In 2024, Debussy was recognized as an Innovator in Healthcare and Life Sciences by Columbus Business First.

In 2026, Debussy's book, The Lavender Bans: A Century of Anti-LGBTQ+ Policies in the US Military, was praised by former United States Secretary of the Army Eric Fanning and Assistant Secretary of Defense for Readiness Shawn Skelly.

== Personal life ==
Originally from the Deep South, Debussy now lives in the Midwest. Debussy previously underwent transgender voice therapy at the Ohio State University Wexner Medical Center.

== Selected publications ==
=== Books ===
- The Lavender Bans: A Century of Anti-LGBTQ+ Policies in the US Military. 2026. New York, NY: Columbia University Press.

=== Chapters and Guidebooks ===
- "Queer Careers: LGBTQ+ Advocacy on Campus and Beyond" in Higher Education Careers Beyond the Professoriate. 2024. Co-authored with Kimberly Creasap. Eds. Karen Cardozo, Katherine Kearns and Shannan Palma. West Lafayette, IN: Purdue University Press.
- Freedom to Serve: The Definitive Guide to LGBTQ+ Military Service. 2023. 3rd edition. Eds. Jennifer Dane and Emily Starbuck Gerson. Washington, D.C.: Modern Military Association of America.

=== Articles ===
- "LGBTQ+ Voters in 4 States Could Swing the 2024 Presidential Election." 2024. The Advocate (magazine).
- "LGBTQ+ Workers Want More Than Just Pride Flags in June." 2024. Yahoo News. Republished from The Conversation (website).
- "What We Can Learn From “Mrs. America” — And Why The ERA Fight Must Continue." 2020. Bust (magazine).

=== Podcast ===
- "LGBTQ+ Workers Want More Than Pinkwashing." 2024. Inside Higher Ed. Distributed by the American Association of Colleges and Universities and WAMC Public Radio.
