= The Short North =

- Neighborhood
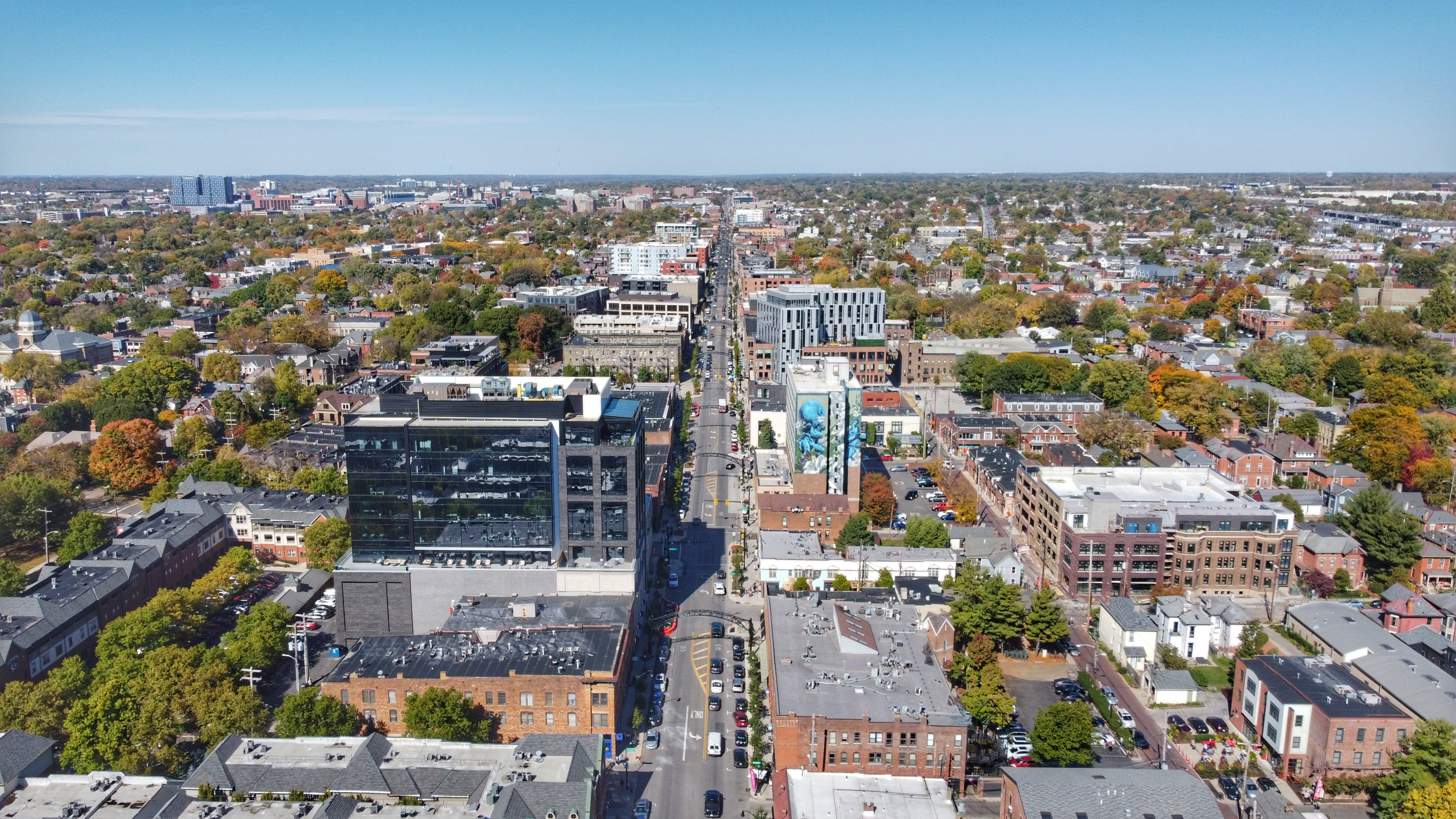
- Interactive map of the neighborhood
- Coordinates: 39°58′47″N 83°00′17″W
- Country: United States
- State: Ohio
- County: Franklin
- City: Columbus
- ZIP Code: 43215, 43201
- Area code: 614/380

The Short North is a neighborhood in Columbus, Ohio, United States, centered on the main strip of High Street immediately north of the Arena District and extending until just south of the University District and Ohio State University. It is an easy walk from the convention center or Nationwide Arena district to the south, spanning the length of High Street from the north side of Goodale Street to the south side of 7th/King Avenue. It is flanked by Victorian Village to the west and Italian Village to the East. The Short North is a densely populated commercial and residential district, with especially high pedestrian use during its monthly "Gallery Hop" and other local and downtown events.

The Short North has been described as "colorful", "offbeat", and "trendy". The district is heavily populated with art galleries, specialty shops, pubs, nightclubs, and coffee shops. Most of its tightly packed brick buildings date from at least the early 20th century, with traditional storefronts along High Street (often with brightly painted murals on their side walls), and old apartment buildings and rowhouses and newer condominium developments in the surrounding blocks. The city installed 17 lighted metal arches extending across High Street throughout the Short North, reminiscent of such arches present in the area in the early 1900s.

== History ==
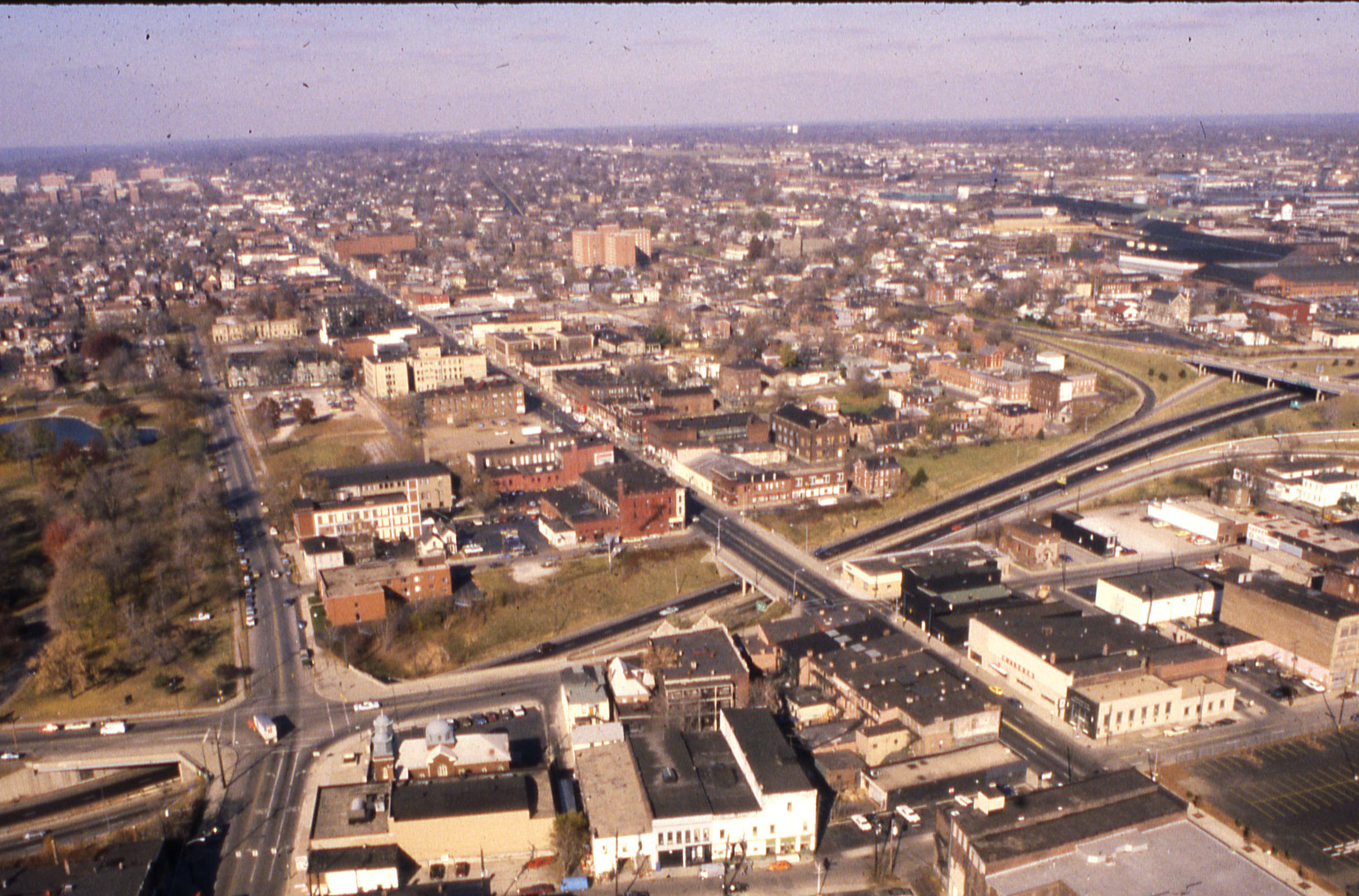
The Short North in 1980

Originally known as part of the "near north side", a common origin story for the name "Short North" has been that it originated as part of vernacular used by police and taxi drivers in the 1980s. Alongside this story was that from a suburban commuter's perspective, the area had fallen 'just short' of the central business district's north end—both physically and economically. In reality, "Short North" as a moniker for the area first appeared in the Columbus Dispatch in 1962 as a location for a secretarial job. By the mid to late 1960s numerous real estate ads in the Dispatch list the area as the Short North. Given the use in print by the 1960s the name may have originated even earlier. In 1981, the Short North Tavern opened in this area, the first business to use this new name.

A reputation for diversity and an artistic, Bohemian atmosphere has marked the Short North, with land prices and local rents rising steadily from the humble beginnings as a squatter's neighborhood in the 1980s. Prior to this gentrification of the neighborhood which originated from artists, it had suffered prolonged decay and from latent, street-level crime and gang violence as affluent Columbus residents followed the economic bubble outward—into the suburbs—during the 1960s and 1970s.

The 1980s saw the neighborhood's rebirth enter into full gear as galleries began to open up and started to flourish. As Maria Gallowy (owner of PM gallery, formerly the oldest gallery in the Short North) once put it "It was one of those neighborhoods that artists love to move into because the possibilities are there." In 1984 two Short North area galleries — the now defunct Art Reach and PM gallery — began opening new exhibits on the first Saturday of every month to help cross-promote their businesses and build a more unified community. This loose coordination later evolved into the Gallery Hop which is still held every first Saturday of the month. The Gallery Hop today features most businesses keeping their doors open late into the night, jam-packed streets, and sidewalks populated with street musicians and other performers.

Since 1983, the Short North has also hosted the annual Doo Dah Parade, a parody of typical Fourth of July parades that includes politically slanted paraders and floats as well as absurdities such as the "Marching Fidels," a band of Fidel Castro lookalikes. The parade starts in neighboring Victorian Village, at Goodale Park, and winds north to finish coming south down High Street.

== Development ==
The City of Columbus has designated the Short North, along with portions of Italian and Victorian Villages as a "market ready" Community Reinvestment Area, with available 15-year, 100 percent tax abatements if projects include 10 percent affordable housing, with options to buy out of the requirement.

Beginning around the turn of the millennium, the Short North has gone under a major period of construction and development. Major construction has turned previously small lots into ten-story buildings, sometimes taller, often with mixed residential, commercial, and office use. A construction at the 800 block of High Street completed in 2019 now houses the US headquarters for Swedish fintech Klarna, as well as two restaurants and a hotel operated by Marriott's Moxy brand.

Some developers, such as the Wood Companies, have been active in the region for many years, and continuing to propose new buildings, such as a fifteen-story residential complex between Hubbard Ave and Wall Street. Further north, Stonewall Columbus has also involved itself in the redevelopment of the Short North, partnering with Black Gold Capital to propose a multi-story complex on the site of Stonewall's current parking lot.

On June 23, 2023, 10 people were shot and injured in a mass shooting on North High Street.

By 2024, as part of a study commissioned by an alliance of local businesses, two consulting firms, JS&A Economic Development Consulting and Metris Arts Consulting, valued the entire Short North to have a total revenue of around US$3.8 billion annually. The study further found that the entire neighborhood is valued at US$954.9 million, generating just over $10 million in tax revenue per year.

== Gallery ==
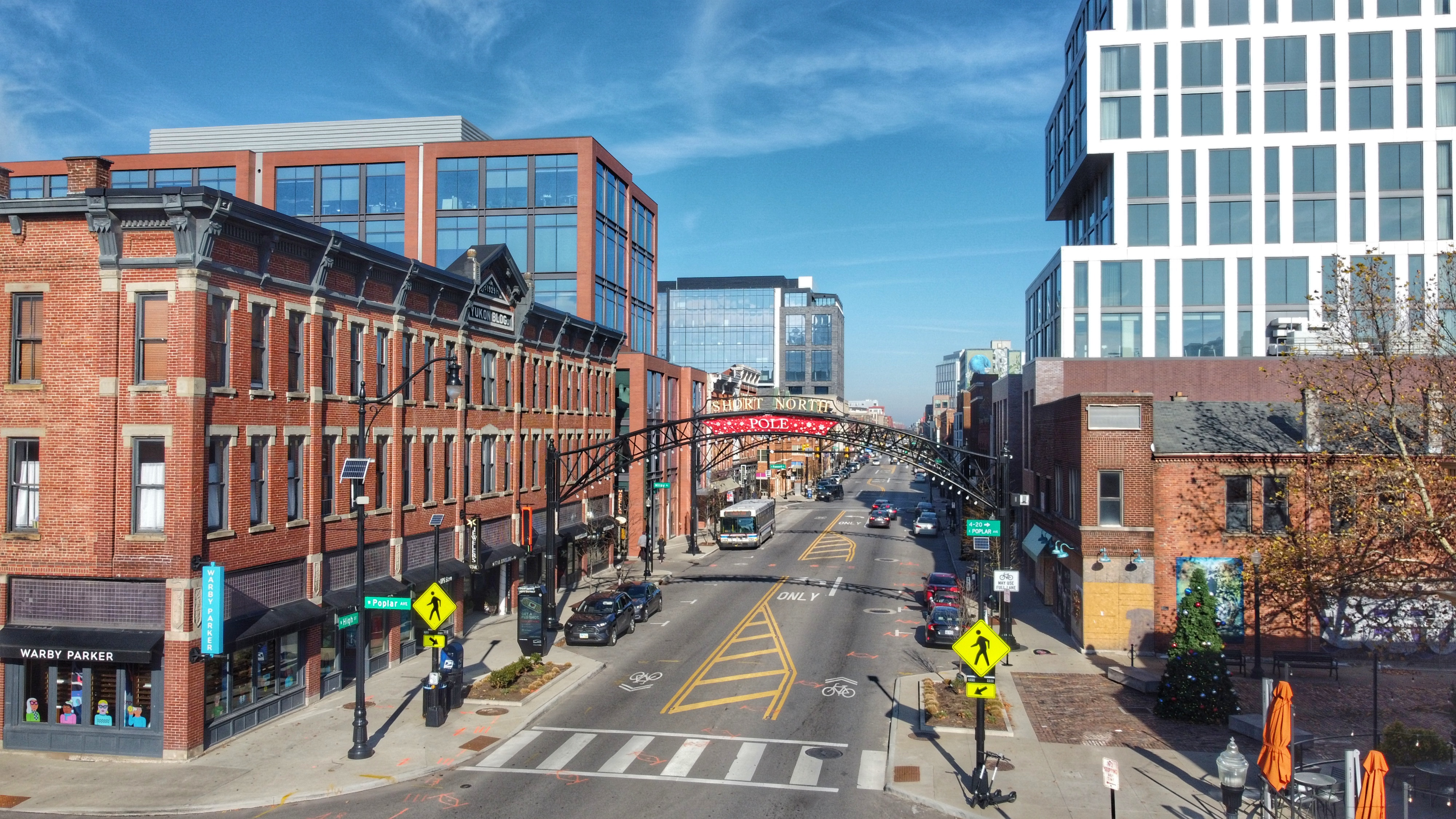
High Street

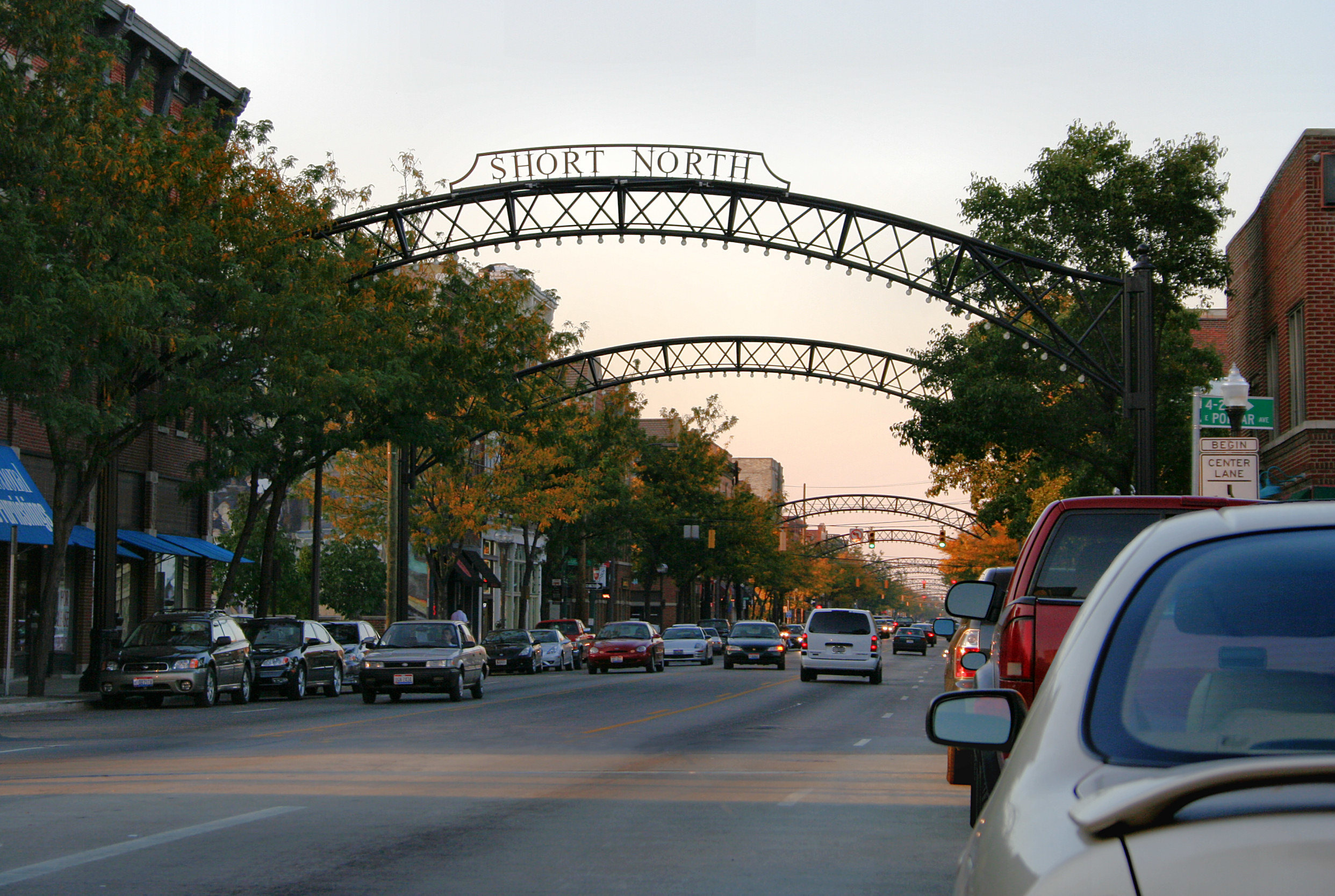
The iconic arches of the Short North

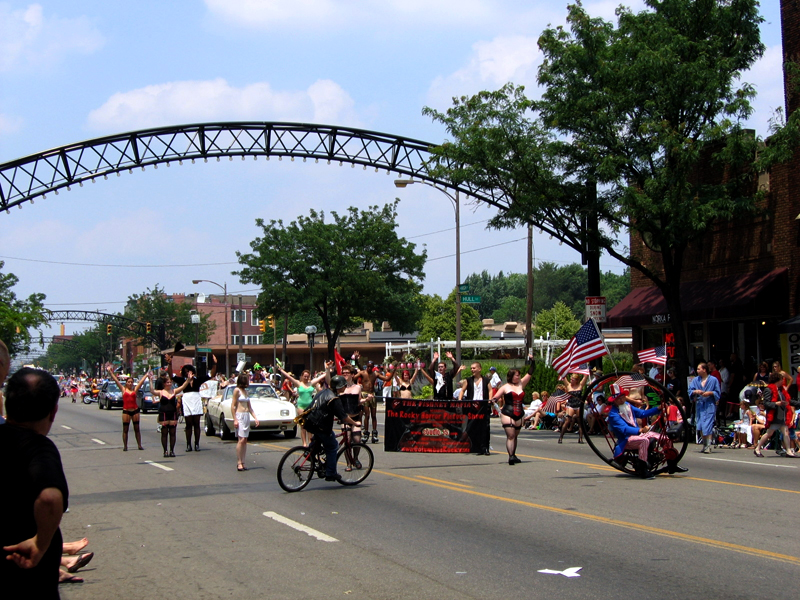
The Short North's Doo Dah Parade, 2005

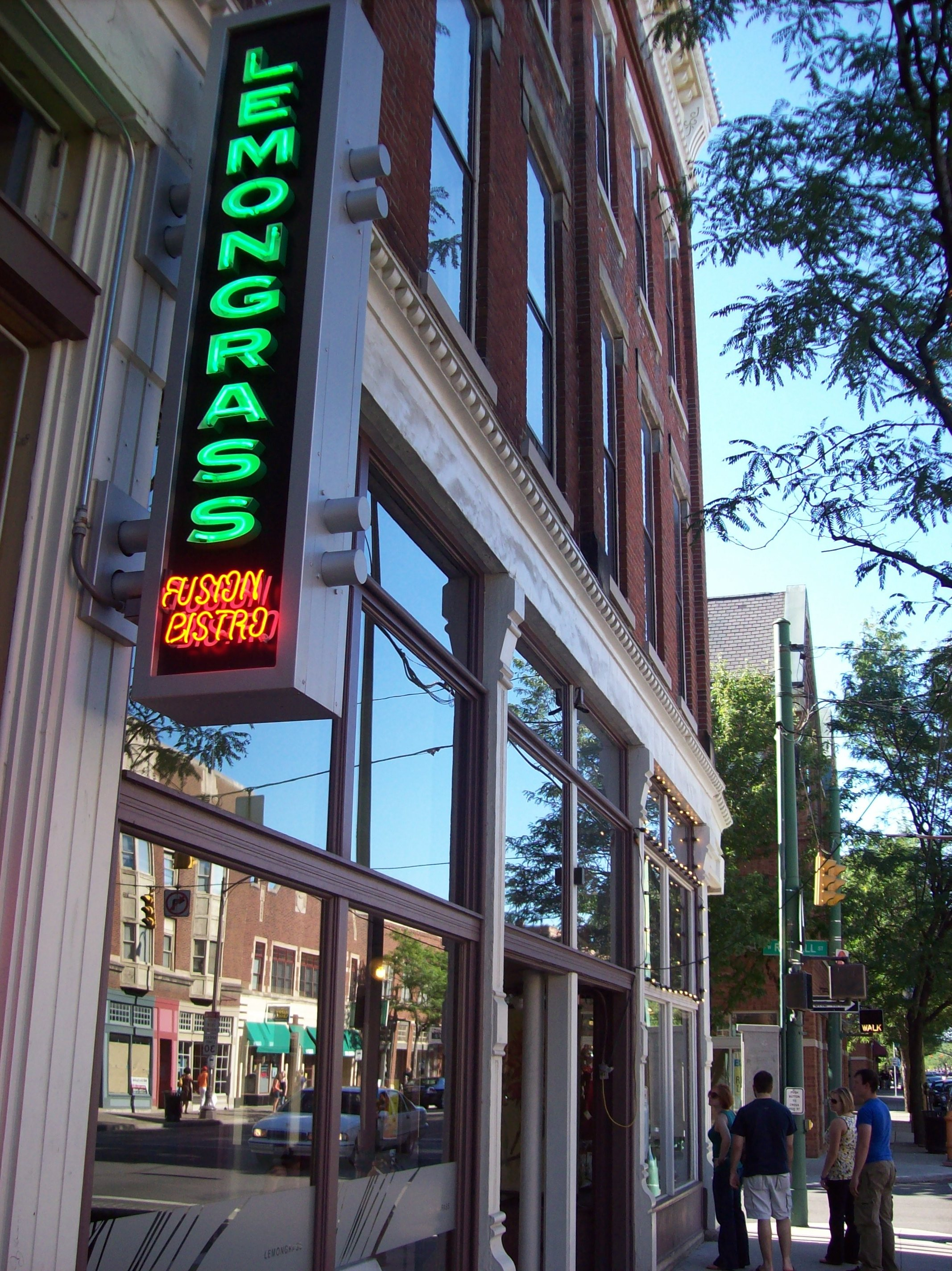
A restaurant in the Short North

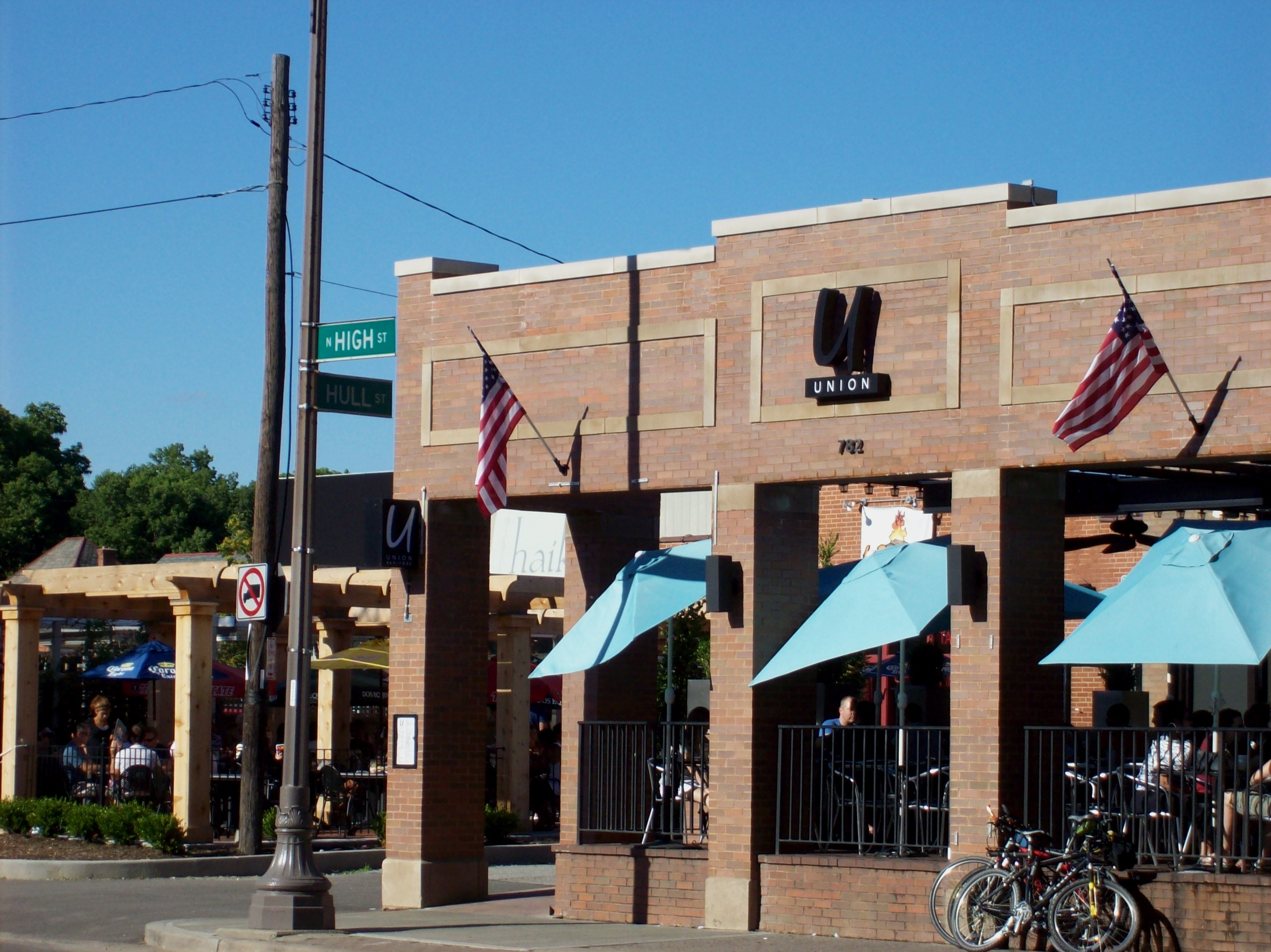
A Short North gay bar

== See also ==
- Short North Historic District
- Fifth Avenue and North High Historic District
- Third Avenue and North High Historic District
