= Stonewall Columbus =

LGBT organization in Columbus, Ohio

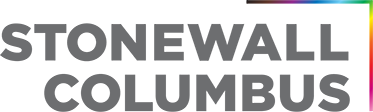

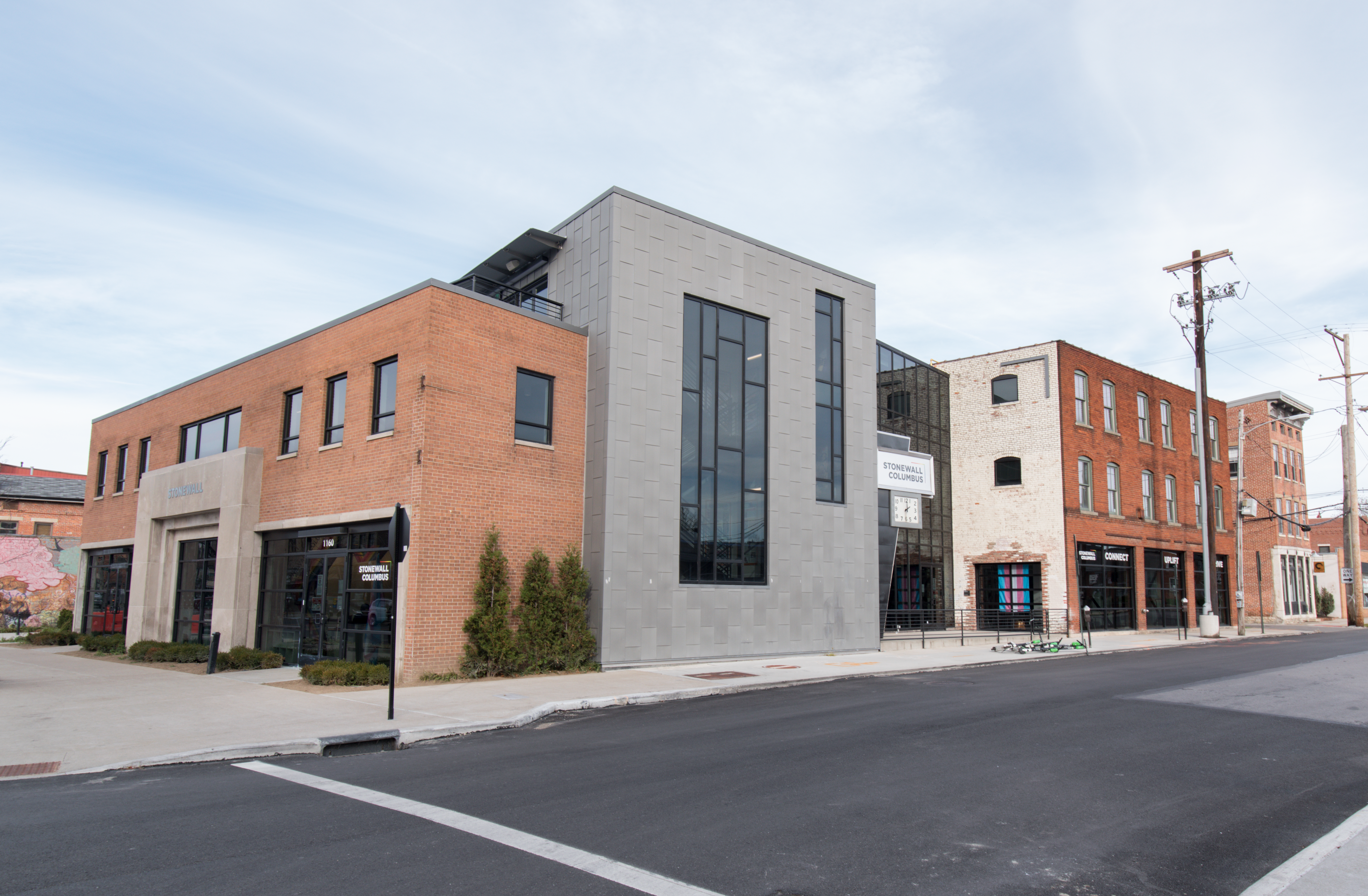
- Named after: Stonewall riots, Stonewall Inn
- Established: 1981; 45 years ago
- Founded at: Columbus, Ohio
- Legal status: 501(c)(3)
- Headquarters: 1160 N. High St., Columbus, Ohio
- President/Board Chair: K. Terry Smith
- Executive Director: Densil R. Porteous (2020-current)
- Board of directors: stonewallcolumbus.org/about/boardoftrustees/
- Website: stonewallcolumbus.org
- Formerly called: Stonewall Union

Stonewall Columbus is a nonprofit organization serving the lesbian, gay, bisexual, transgender, and queer (LGBTQ) population of Columbus, Ohio. The organization is located in the Short North district of Columbus.

Stonewall Columbus is the organizer of the annual Columbus Pride.

The organization operates the Stonewall Columbus Community Center, a 15,000 sq ft (1,400 m^{2}) building in the Short North. The community center was funded with $3.8 million in donations and opened in 2019. It expanded upon their previous center, known as the Center on High.

== History ==
Stonewall Columbus was founded as Stonewall Union in 1981.

Stonewall Union was incorporated by local Columbus, Ohio gay activists (Craig Covey, Steve Wilson, Rick Rommele, Craig Huffman, Dennis Valot, Val Thogmartin and Keith McKnight) in 1981, in response to Jerry Falwell's attempt to establish a Columbus-based Moral Majority headquarters.

It held its first pride parade in 1982, following a small parade in 1981. Since then, the group's annual event, Columbus Pride, has become the second largest pride event in the Midwestern United States.

In 1995, Stonewall Columbus moved into a facility on North High Street in the Short North area of Columbus. The organization purchased the building in 2005 and later expanded into an adjacent structure. Beginning in 2017, Stonewall Columbus undertook a major renovation of the site, reopening the space in 2018 as the Stonewall Columbus Community Center.

== Stonewall Columbus Pride Festival and March/Parade ==
The Stonewall Columbus Pride Festival and March is an annual LGBTQ+ celebration held in downtown Columbus, Ohio, organized by Stonewall Columbus. The Pride march in Columbus started in 1982, with around 200 people participating in the inaugural event. The event includes a public march, festival programming, live entertainment, and community resource engagement. In 2018, an Associated Press report noted that nearly 10,000 people marched with an even larger crowd watching along the streets of downtown Columbus, highlighting the event's community presence and cultural significance. According to local media reporting, the 2025 festival and march drew over 650,000 attendees across its two days.

=== Controversy: 2017 Parade ===
In 2017, a controversy arose when four protesters were arrested during the Stonewall Columbus pride parade. The protesters were blocking the parade from proceeding, and protesting Stonewall's lack of intersectionality and the large volume of police at the event. The protesters, known as the Black Pride 4, ignored police orders to clear the street and were then arrested. Three of the protesters were sentenced to community service and probation. The controversy prompted a dispute over Stonewall Columbus's view of racial minorities. Amid calls for the organization's director to step down, the pride festival coordinator resigned, admitting the group [wa]s unsympathetic to gay and transgender people of color. Stonewall's director retired the following year. Also in 2018, Black Queer & Intersectional Collective hosted Columbus Community Pride, as an alternative to Stonewall Columbus's event, on the same day. The group hired a black, trans-owned security company to monitor their festival, and refused any corporate sponsors.

== Public Art Installation ==
Pride Circles - 2021

In December 2021, Stonewall Columbus unveiled "Pride Circles," the first permanent public art installation in the public right-of-way in the City of Columbus, OH. Created by local visual artist Lisa McLymont, this installation features representations of various LGBTQ+ pride and identity flags arranged in the form of ripples on a pond. The artwork, made of thermoplastic, symbolizes the impact of individual efforts in creating broader societal change, akin to the queer rights movement. The ripples coalesce around the entrance of the Stonewall Columbus Community Center.

== Recognition ==
Ohio Historical Marker - 2025

Stonewall Columbus received local and state recognition for its contributions to LGBTQ+ history and community development. In 2025, the organization was awarded an Ohio Historical Marker recognizing its role in advancing LGBTQ+ visibility and rights in Columbus.

== See also ==
- Stonewall Riots
- Stonewall Inn
- List of LGBT-related organizations and conferences
- List of LGBT community centers
