= Schlee-Kemmler Building =

- U.S. National Register of Historic Places
- U.S. Historic district – Contributing property
- Columbus Register of Historic Properties
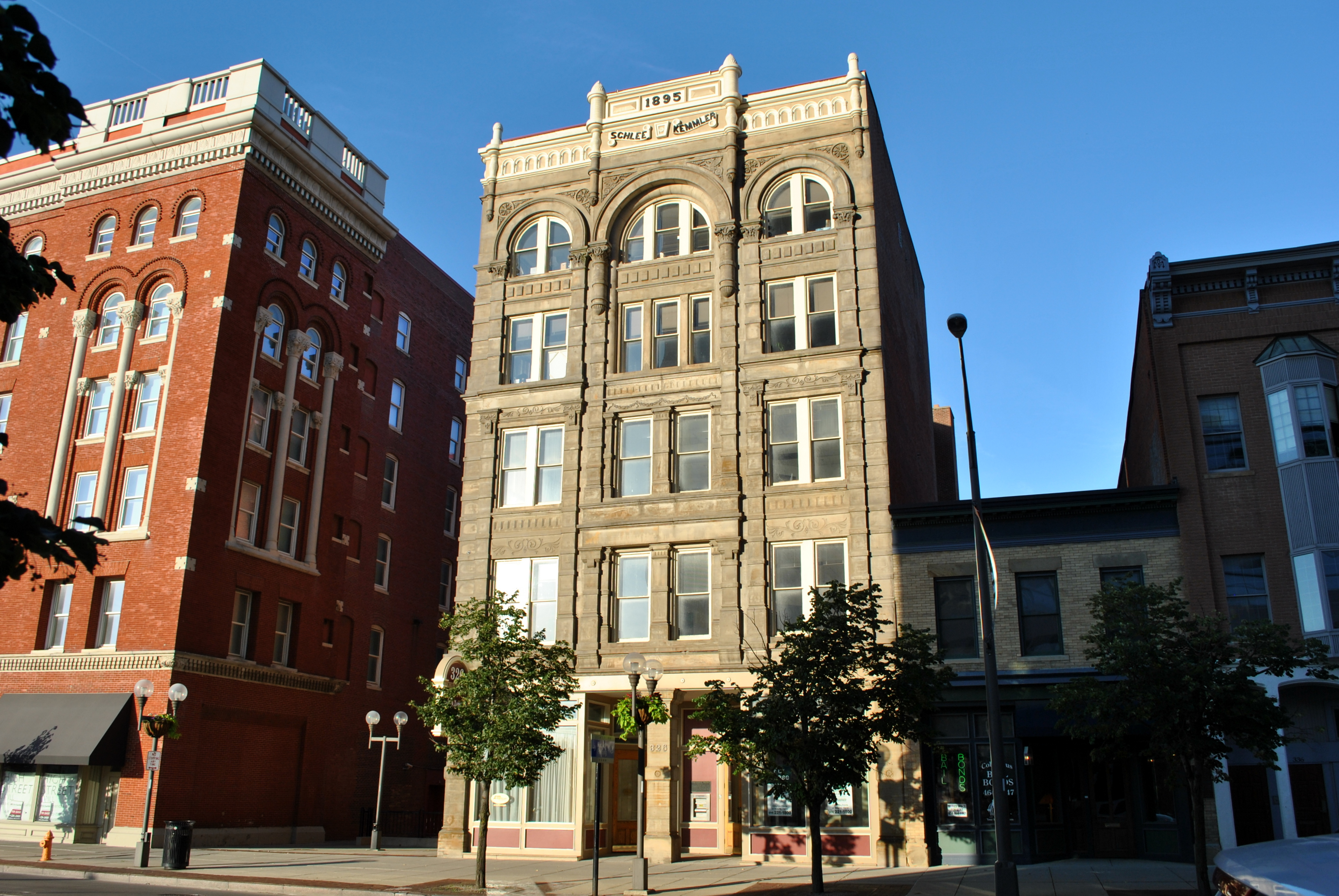
- Interactive map highlighting the building's location
- Location: 328 S. High Street, Columbus, Ohio
- Coordinates: 39.955408°N 82.999056°W
- Built: 1895
- Architect: Dauben, Krumm & Riebel
- Architectural style: Romanesque Revival
- Part of: South High Commercial Historic District
- NRHP reference No.: 82001461
- CRHP No.: CR-15

Significant dates
- Added to NRHP: December 2, 1982
- Designated CRHP: January 10, 1983

The Schlee-Kemmler Building is a historic building in Downtown Columbus, Ohio, United States. The building was listed on the National Register of Historic Places in 1982 and the Columbus Register of Historic Properties in 1983. It was also included in the South High Commercial Historic District, added to those registers in 1983 and 1987, respectively.

The building was constructed in 1895 and was designed for a brewer’s office and insurance agency. In 1986, it was renovated by Lincoln Construction Co. into offices. By 2019, the building was vacant and in 2022, architecture firm BBCO and Day Companies purchased the building. Renovations were completed in 2024.

The building was nominated to the National Register for its significance as one of few 19th century commercial buildings with stone facades left in Columbus, and the most ornamental of those that remain.

== See also ==
- National Register of Historic Places listings in Columbus, Ohio
