= South High Commercial Historic District =

Historic district in Ohio, United States

- South High Street Commercial Grouping
- U.S. National Register of Historic Places
- U.S. Historic district
- Columbus Register of Historic Properties
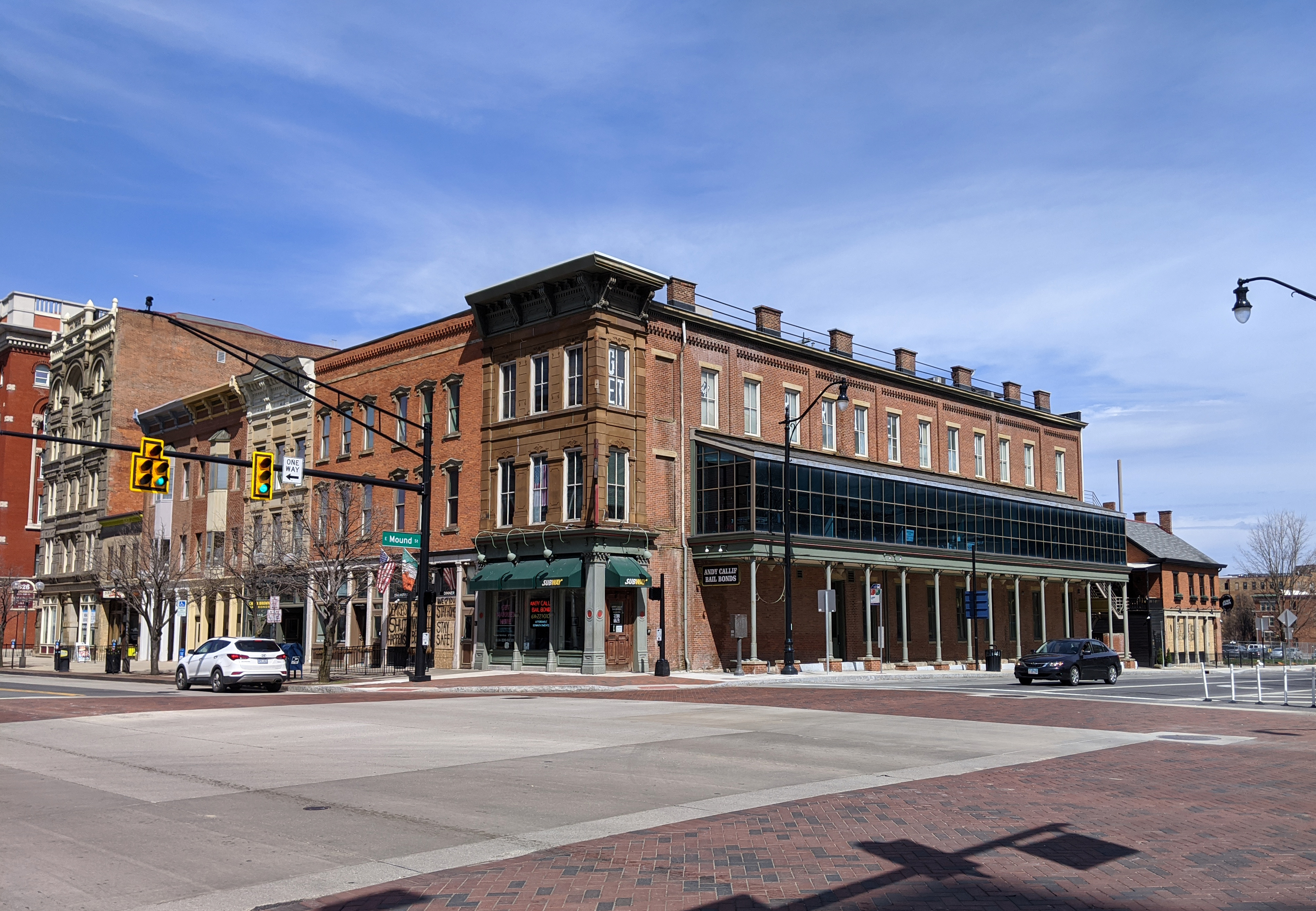
- Southern block
- Interactive map highlighting the district's boundaries
- Location: Downtown Columbus, Ohio
- Coordinates: 39.955187°N 82.998976°W
- NRHP reference No.: 83004301
- CRHP No.: CR-47

Significant dates
- Added to NRHP: December 29, 1983
- Designated CRHP: December 8, 1987

The South High Commercial Historic District is a historic district on High Street in Downtown Columbus, Ohio. The site was listed on the National Register of Historic Places in 1983 and the Columbus Register of Historic Properties in 1987.

The district includes 11 contributing commercial buildings, spanning two city blocks. The northern block includes the Great Southern Hotel and Theatre and the Schlee-Kemmler Building, both already individually listed in the Columbus and National Registers. The southern block includes nine commercial buildings from the late 19th century, mostly 2-3 stories in height, featuring a variety of architectural details. The blocks are among the last remaining cohesive streetscapes left in downtown Columbus.

== Gallery ==
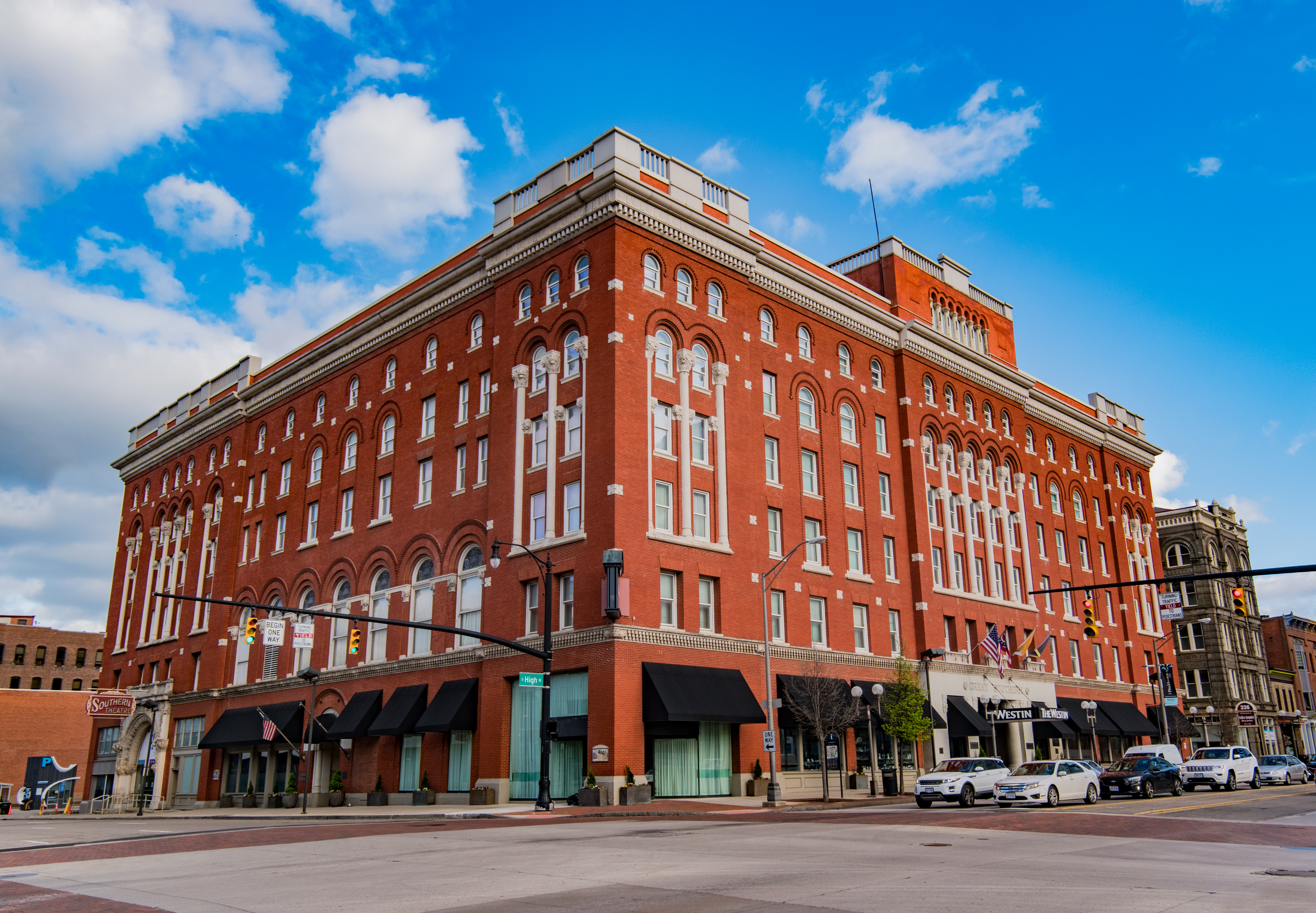
The Great Southern Hotel & Theatre

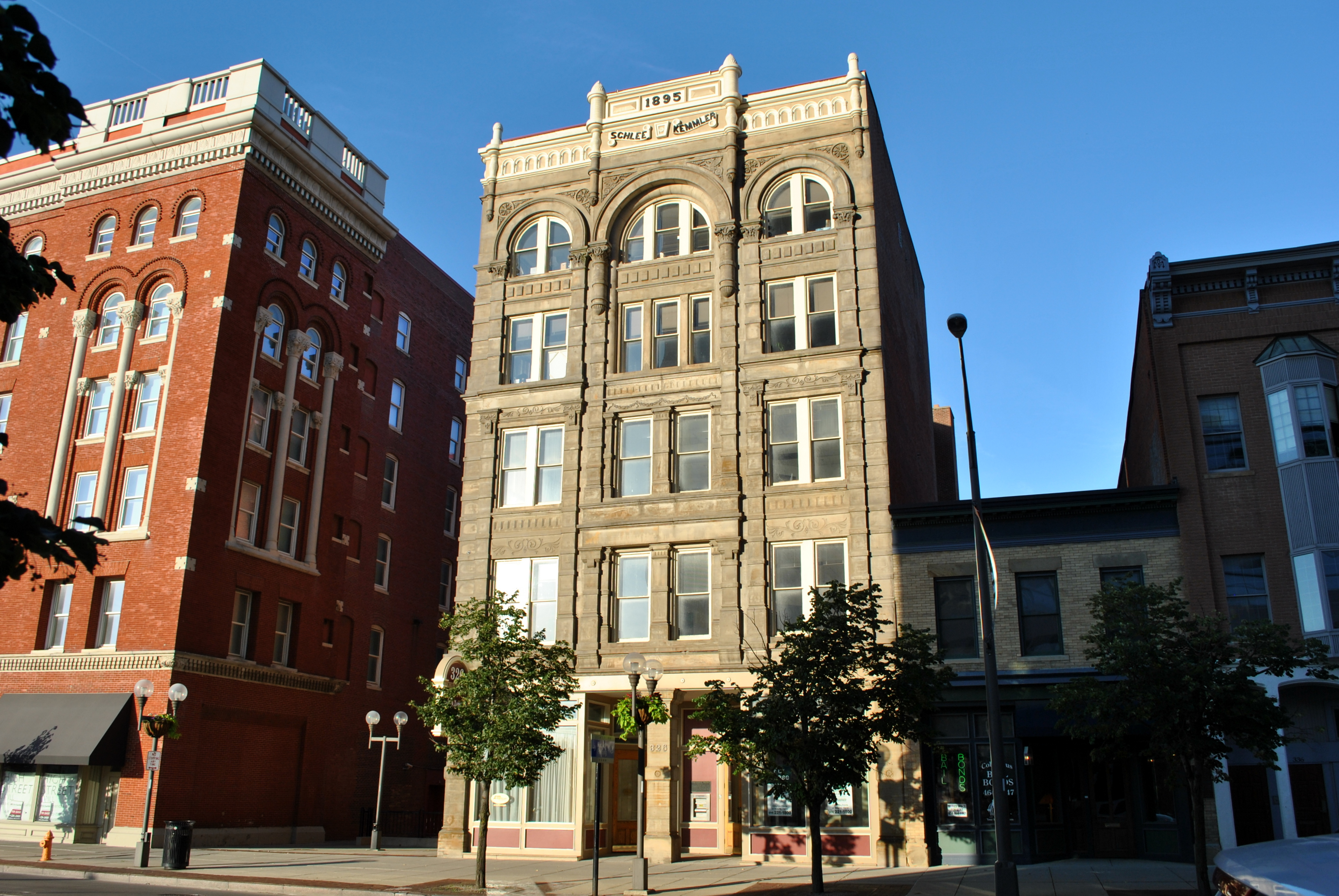
The Schlee-Kemmler Building

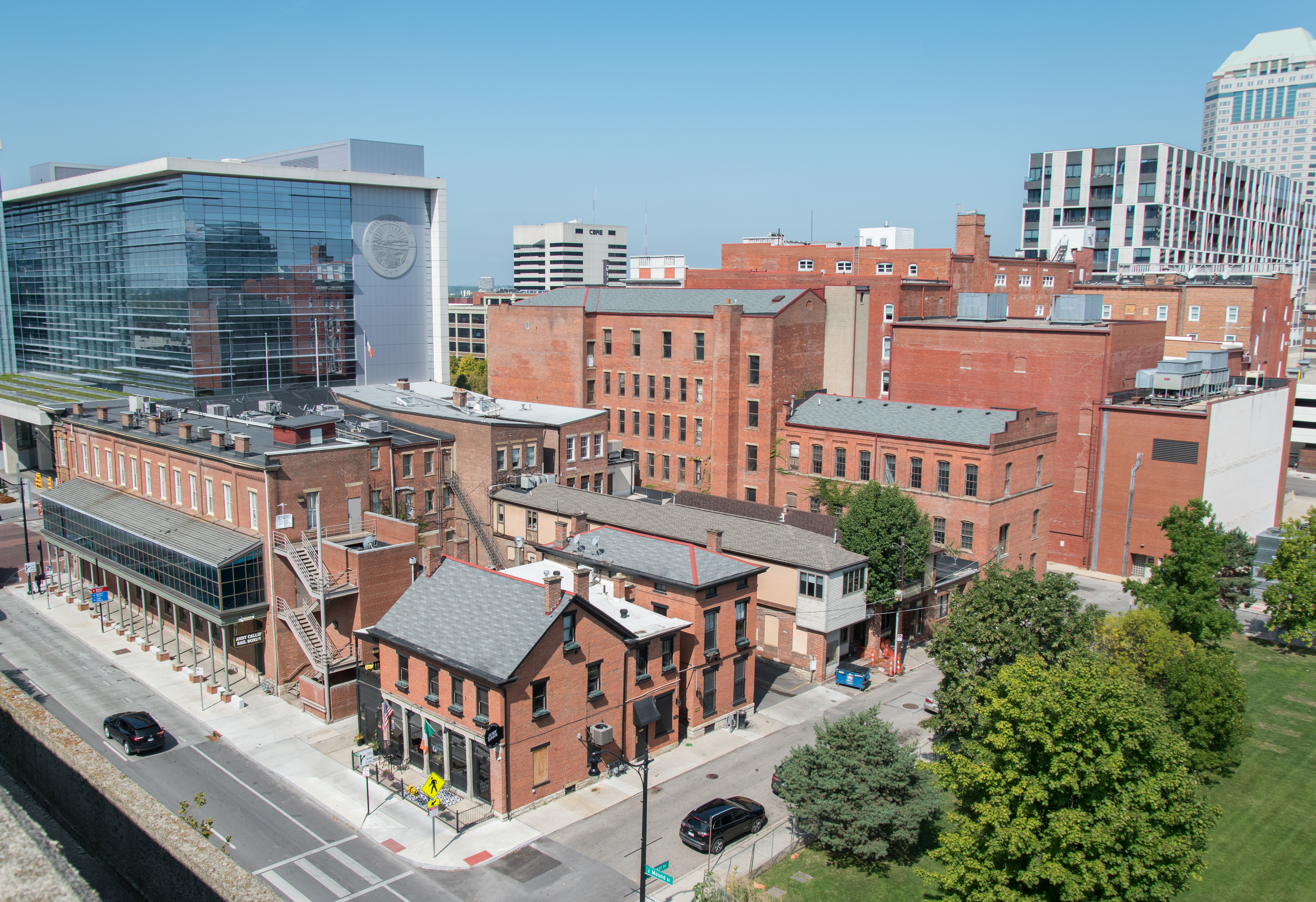
View of the district blocks from the southeast

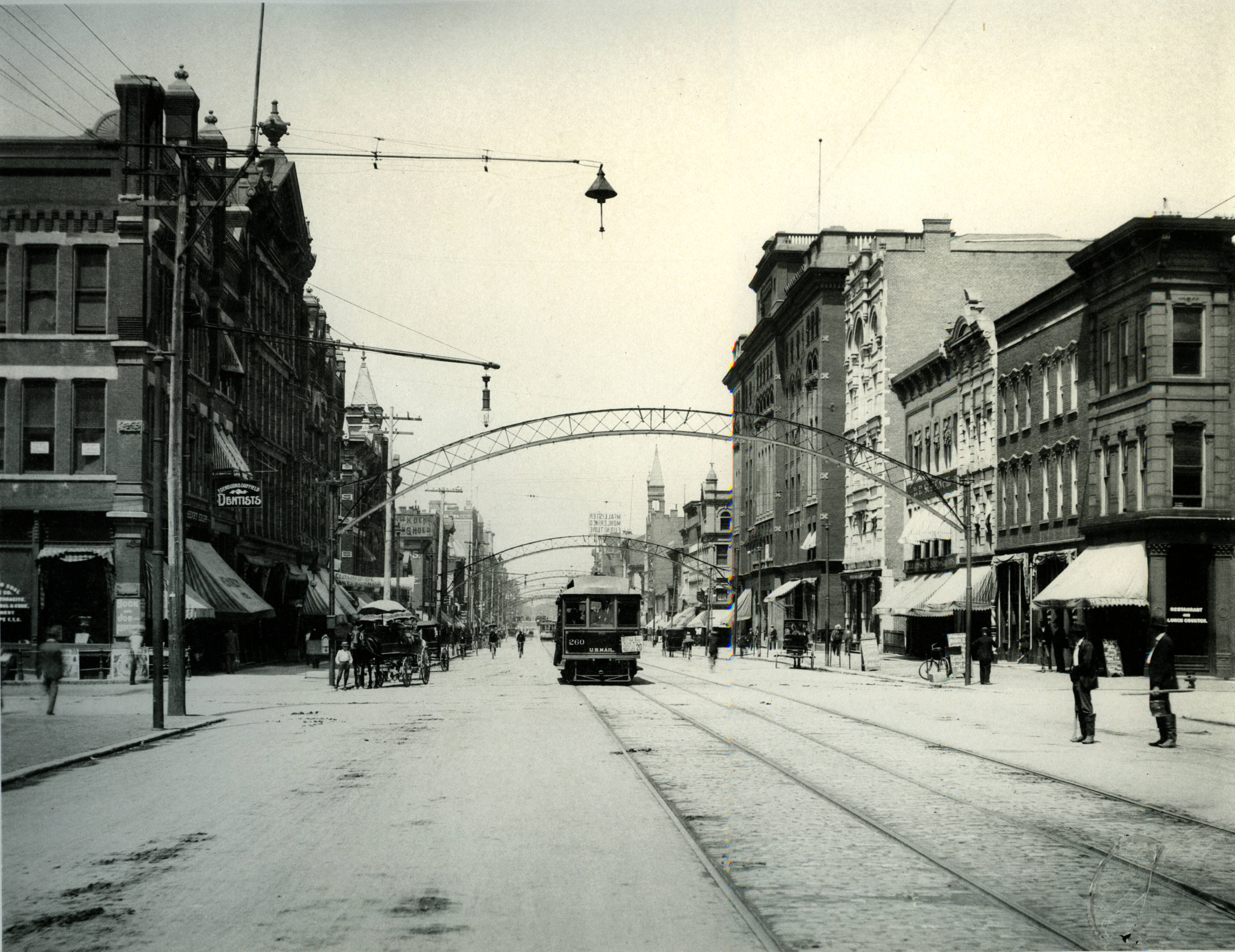
District buildings
(right side) c. 1897

== See also ==
- National Register of Historic Places listings in Columbus, Ohio
