= 2015 Columbus, Ohio mayoral election =

- November 3, 2015
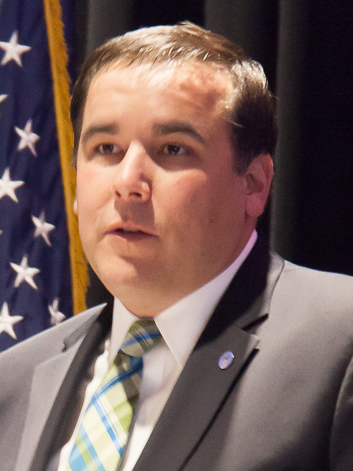

Candidate	Andrew Ginther	Zach Scott
Party	Nonpartisan	Nonpartisan
Popular vote	88,822	60,686
Percentage	59%	41%
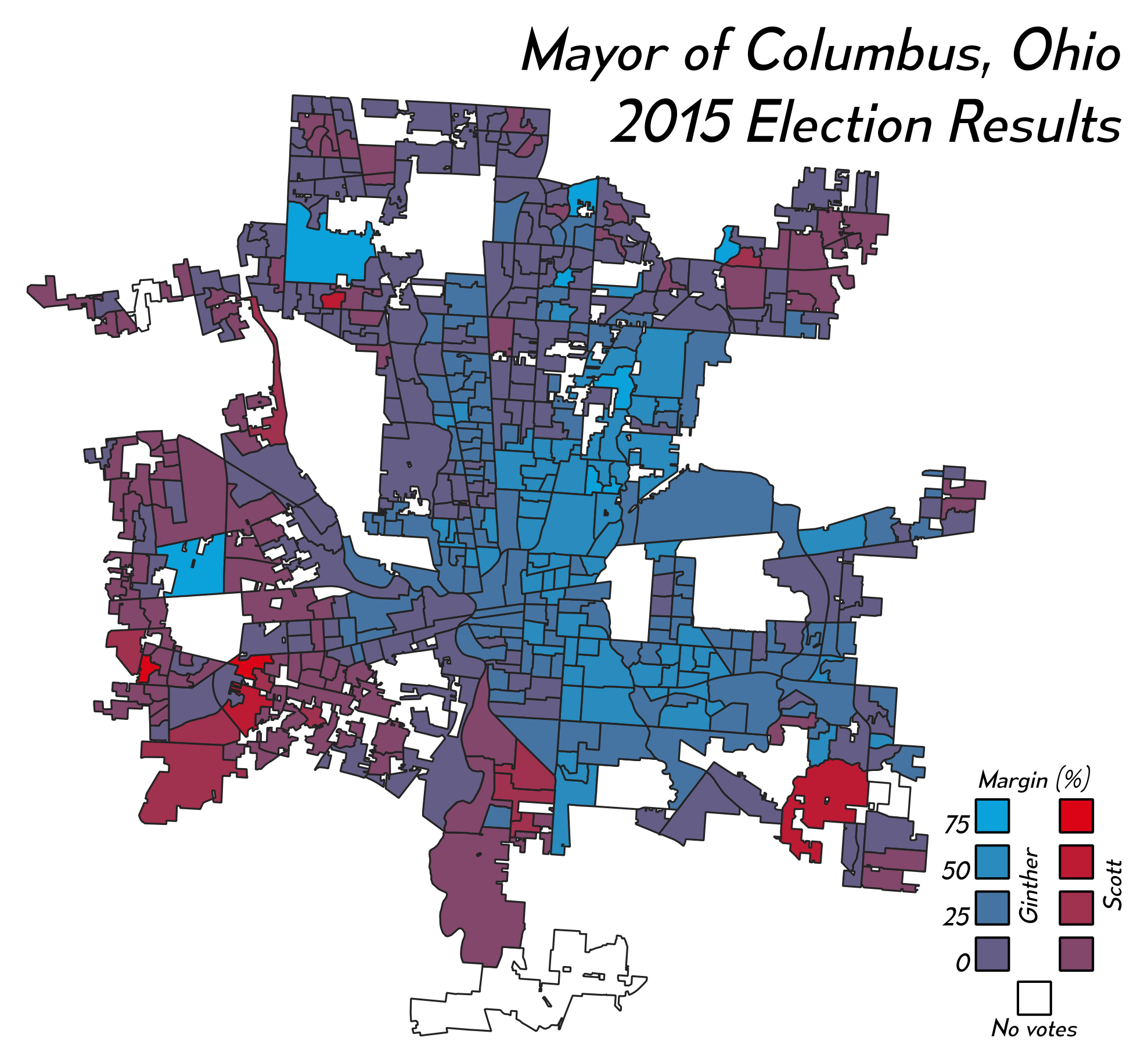
Mayor before election
Michael B. Coleman
Democratic
Elected mayor
Andrew Ginther
Democratic

The 2015 Columbus mayoral election took place on November 3, 2015, to elect the Mayor of Columbus, Ohio. The election was officially nonpartisan, with the top two candidates from the May 5 primary advancing to the general election, regardless of party.

Incumbent Democratic Mayor Michael B. Coleman was not running for re-election to a fifth term in office.

== Candidates ==
=== Democratic Party ===
==== Declared ====
- Andrew Ginther, President of the Columbus City Council
- James Ragland, development director at the Cristo Rey Columbus High School and former State Central Committeeman for the Ohio Democratic Party
- Zach Scott, Franklin County Sheriff

==== Declined ====
- Joyce Beatty, U.S. Representative (endorsed Ginther)
- Kevin Boyce, State Representative and former Ohio State Treasurer (endorsed Ginther)
- John Patrick Carney, State Representative and nominee for Ohio State Auditor in 2014
- Michael B. Coleman, incumbent mayor (endorsed Ginther)
- Tracy Maxwell Heard, Minority Leader of the Ohio House of Representatives
- Michael C. Mentel, attorney and former Columbus City Council President
- Michelle Mills, Columbus City Councilmember
- Charleta Tavares, State Senator

=== Republican Party ===
==== Declared ====
- Terry Boyd, former President of the Columbus Board of Education

==== Declined ====
- Jim Hughes, State Senator
- Ron O'Brien, Franklin County Prosecuting Attorney

== Primary results ==
The Columbus Mayoral primary was nonpartisan, but candidates were endorsed by their parties. The two candidates who received the most votes advanced to the general election in November regardless of party.

Primary election result
Party	Candidate	Votes	%
Nonpartisan	Andrew Ginther	24,227	51.8
Nonpartisan	Zach Scott	8,560	18.3
Nonpartisan	Terry Boyd	8,461	18.1
Nonpartisan	James Ragland	5,552	11.9

== General election results ==
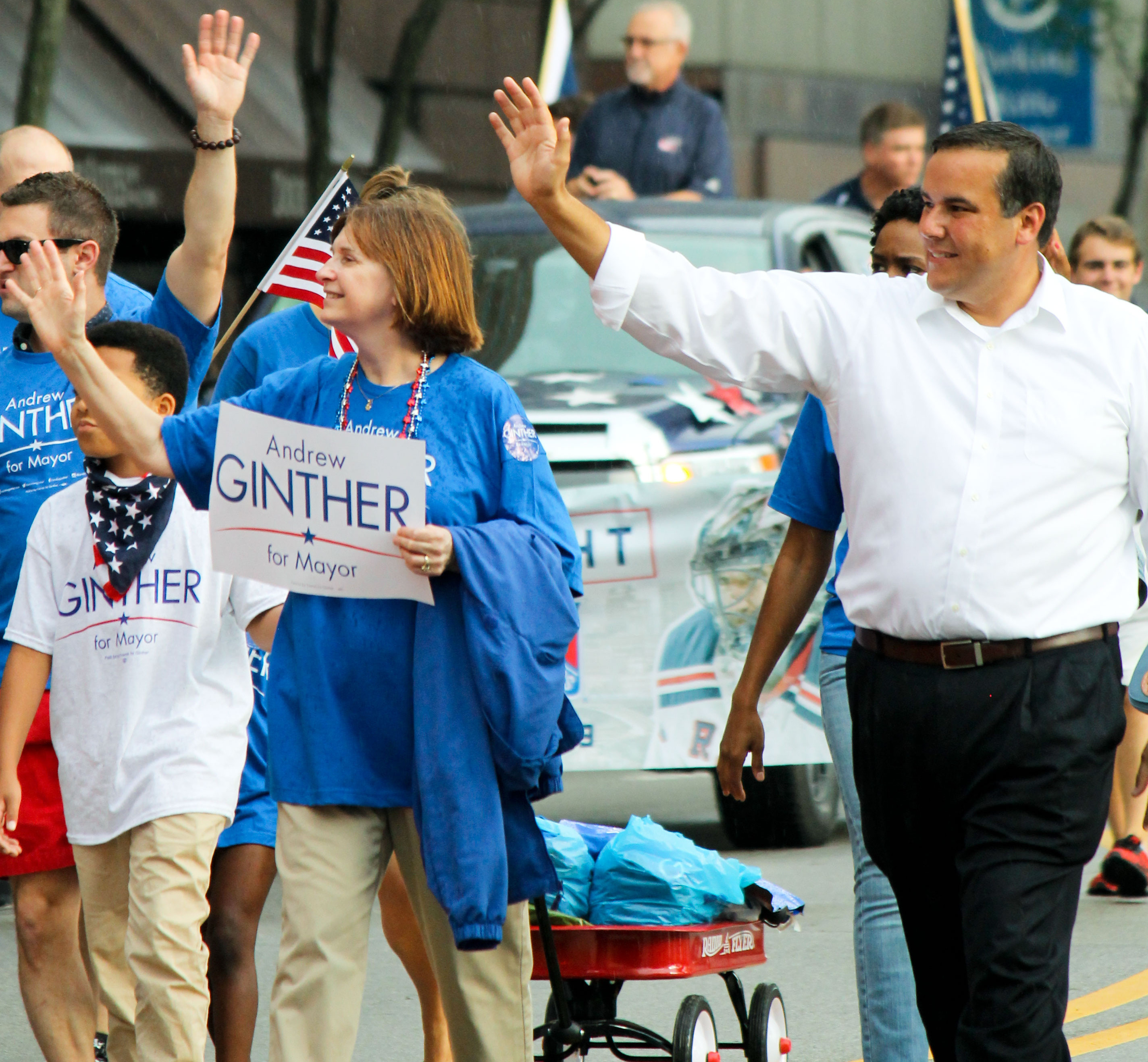
Ginther Marching in Columbus' Independence Day parade during his campaign

General election result
Party	Candidate	Votes	%
Nonpartisan	Andrew Ginther	88,822	59
Nonpartisan	Zach Scott	60,686	41
