= Topiary Park =

Park and garden in Columbus, Ohio, U.S.

- Old Deaf School Park
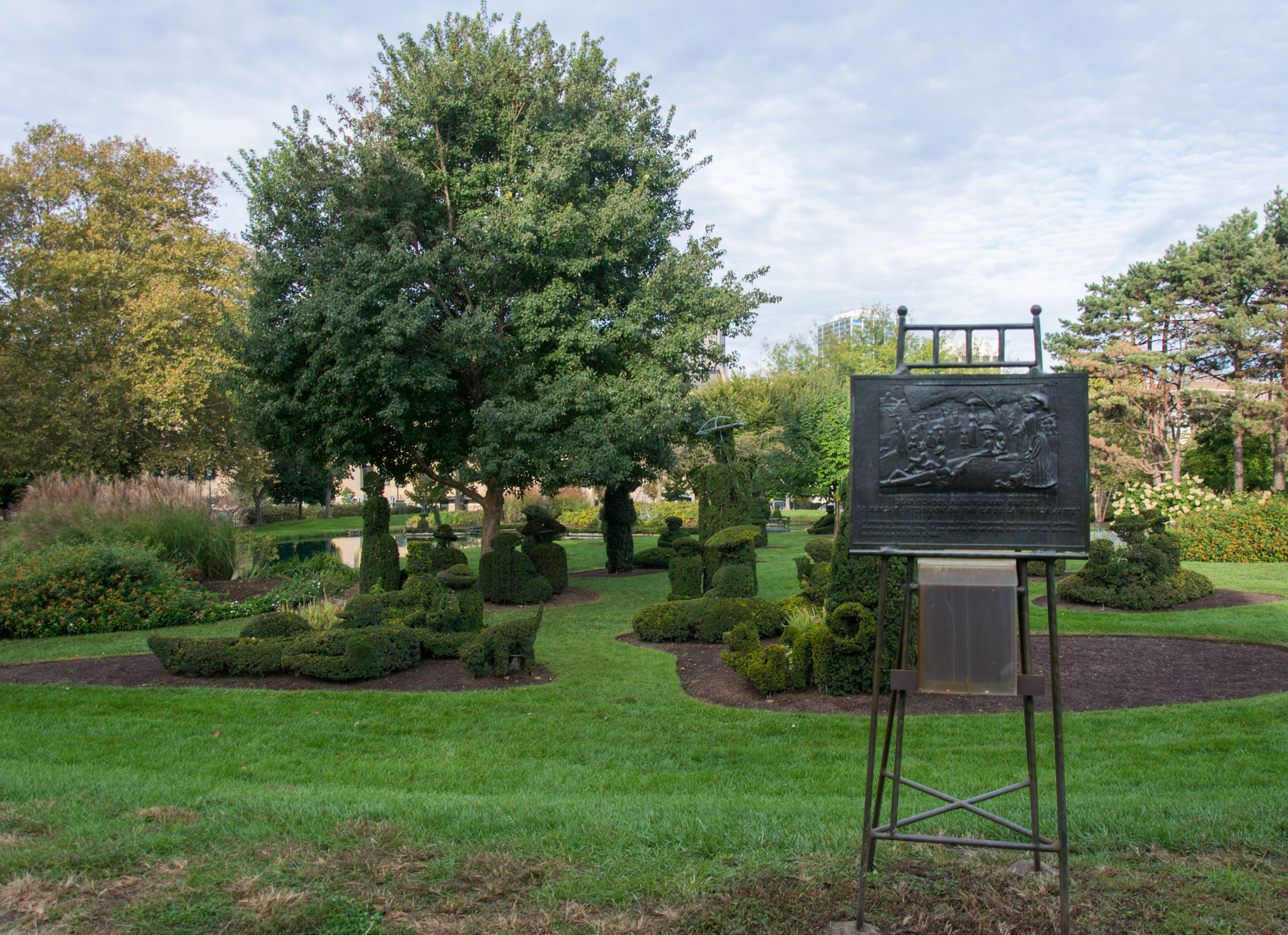
- The park's central design, replicating A Sunday Afternoon on the Island of La Grande Jatte
- Interactive map of Topiary Park
- Type: Urban park
- Location: Columbus, Ohio, U.S.
- Coordinates: 39°57′40″N 82°59′15″W
- Area: 9.182 acres (3.716 ha)
- Opened: 1980s
- Designer: James T. Mason; Elaine Mason
- Administrator: Columbus Recreation and Parks Department
- Public transit: 10, 11; CoGo
- Website: Official website

Topiary Park is a 9.2-acre (3.7 ha) public park and garden in Columbus, Ohio's Discovery District. The park's topiary garden, officially the Topiary Garden at Old Deaf School Park, is designed to depict figures from Georges Seurat's 1884 painting, A Sunday Afternoon on the Island of La Grande Jatte. It is the only park based entirely on a painting.

The park is officially named Old Deaf School Park, as it was part of the campus of the Ohio Institution for the Deaf and Dumb, known today as the Ohio School for the Deaf. It is owned by the city of Columbus and maintained by the Columbus Recreation and Parks Department.

== Description ==
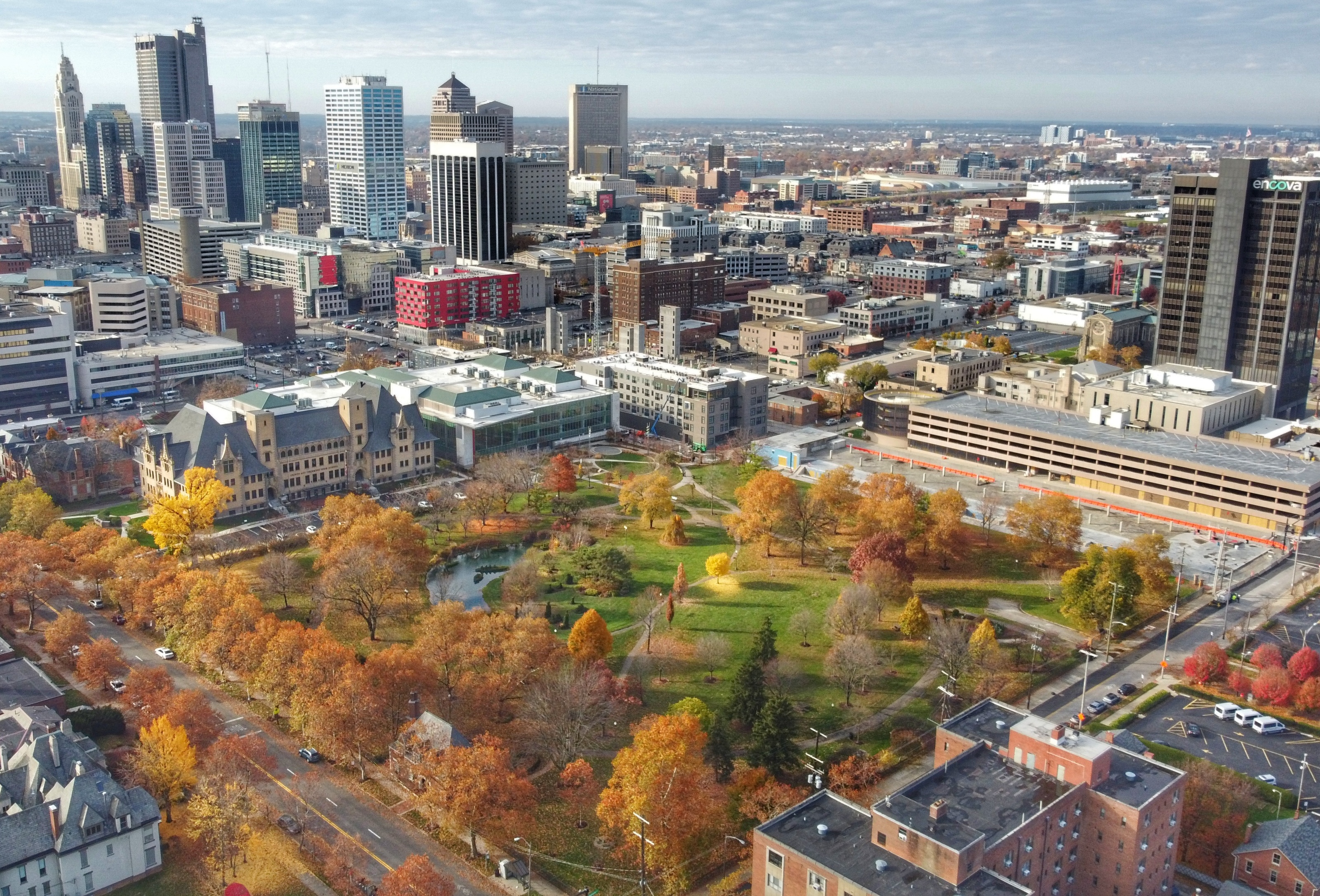
Aerial view in autumn

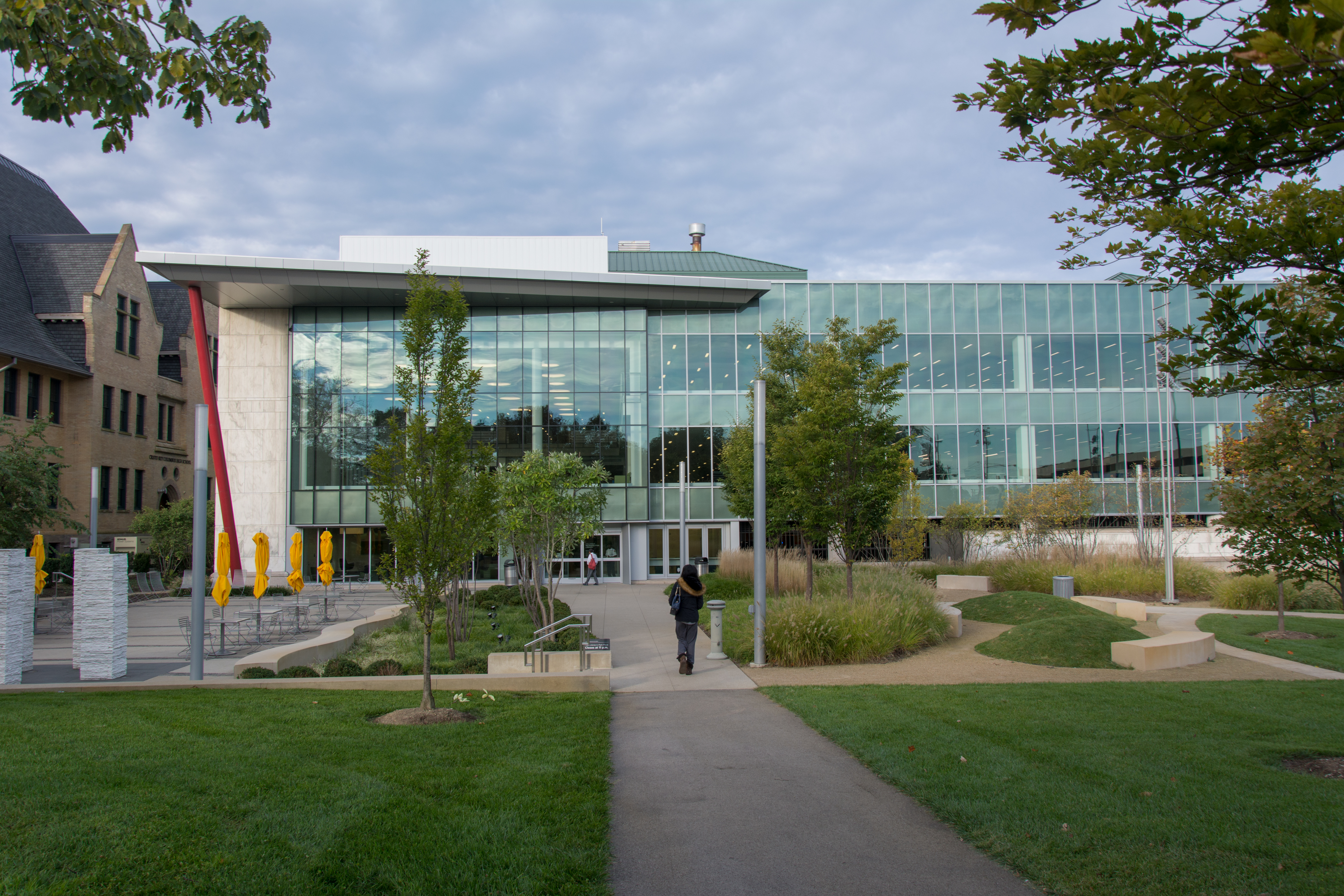
Parkland and seating adjoining the Columbus Metropolitan Library to the park

The park is located in downtown Columbus. It features topiaries trimmed into life-size shapes of men, women, children, animals, and boats and arranged to resemble the painting A Sunday Afternoon on the Island of La Grande Jatte. Specifically, there are topiaries of 54 people, eight boats, three dogs, a monkey, and a cat. It also hosts 220 trees, including 35 different species. A cast-iron fence surrounds the space. The park hosts jazz concerts.

The park is adjacent to the Main Branch of the Columbus Metropolitan Library system. The branch was renovated around 2015, with one of the architect's goals being to join the library to the park.

The gatehouse, near the southeast corner of the park, is the park's main entrance. The 2,400-square-foot (220 m^{2}) building holds offices, restrooms, and an information desk and gift shop. It was constructed in 1998, designed in brick and resembling a French countryside house to match the park's theme. The building was funded by the City of Columbus, Motorists Mutual Insurance, and the Friends of the Topiary Park.

== History ==
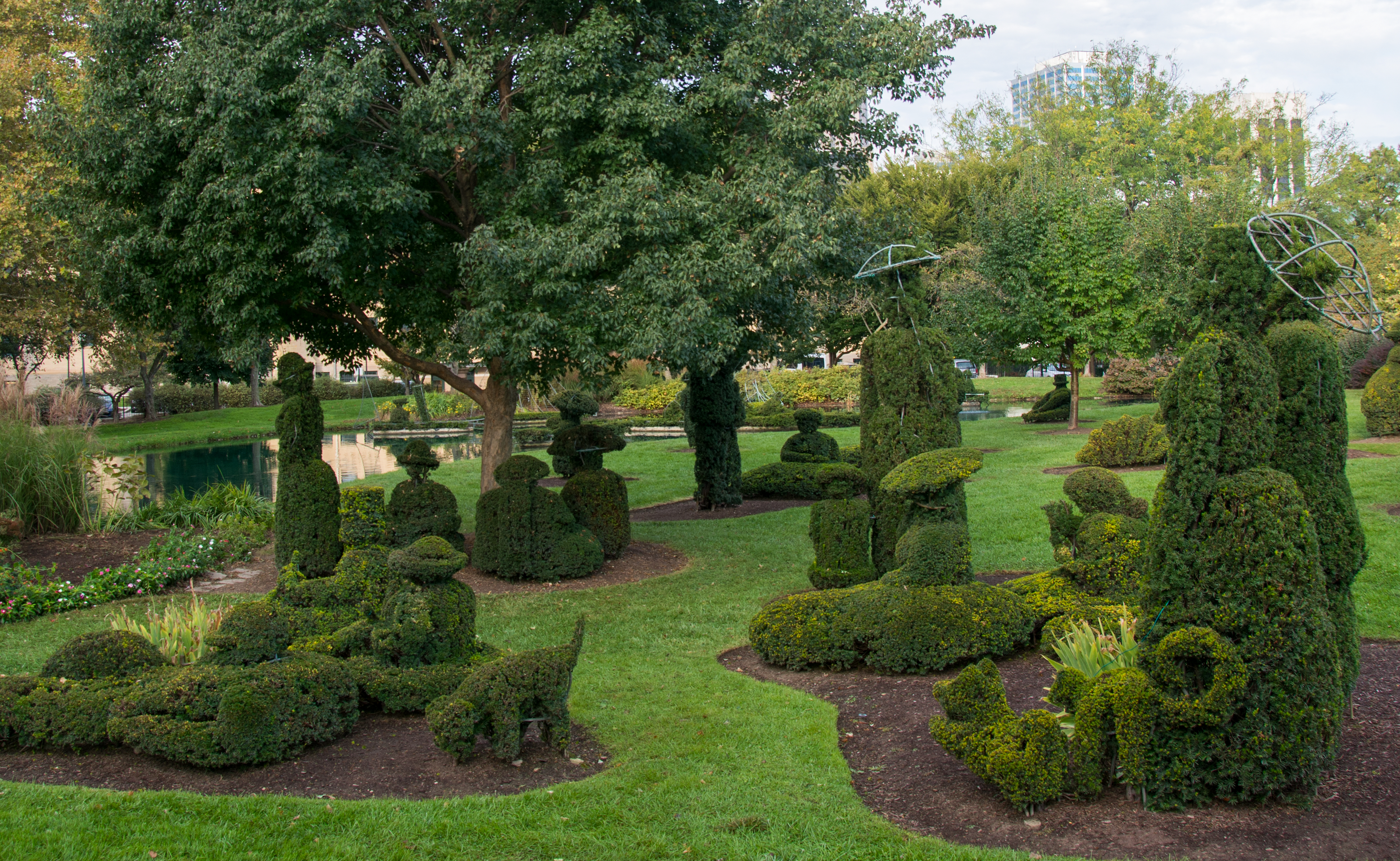
A section of the park

The land was formerly part of the 10-acre (4 ha) grounds purchased in 1829 for the Ohio Institution for the Deaf and Dumb. When the school moved locations in 1953, the neighborhood began to decline. Most of the school's buildings burned down in 1981, leading to the development of the park, which helped revitalize the area.

In 1984, one of the remaining school buildings, the modern-day Cristo Rey Columbus High School, was added to the National Register of Historic Places. The nomination includes all 10 acres of the former campus grounds.

The park was first developed in the mid-1980s as Old Deaf School Park. Topiary Park and its garden was conceived by Columbus artists James and Elaine Mason. It was built as a garden exhibit for the AmeriFlora exhibition that took place in Columbus in 1992, and was sculpted in 1989, along with installation of hills and a small pond, meant to represent the River Seine.

== Gallery ==
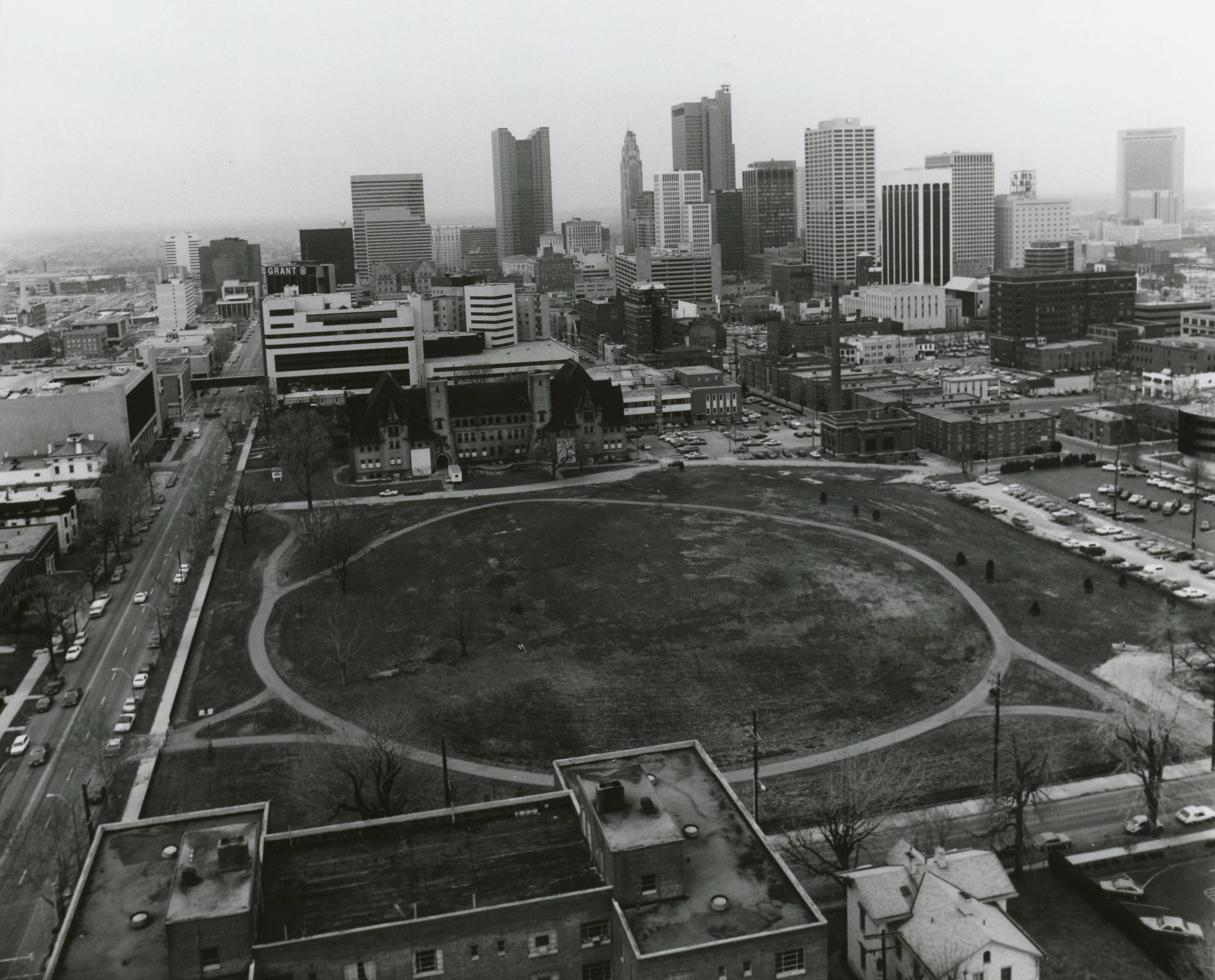
The park pre-1989

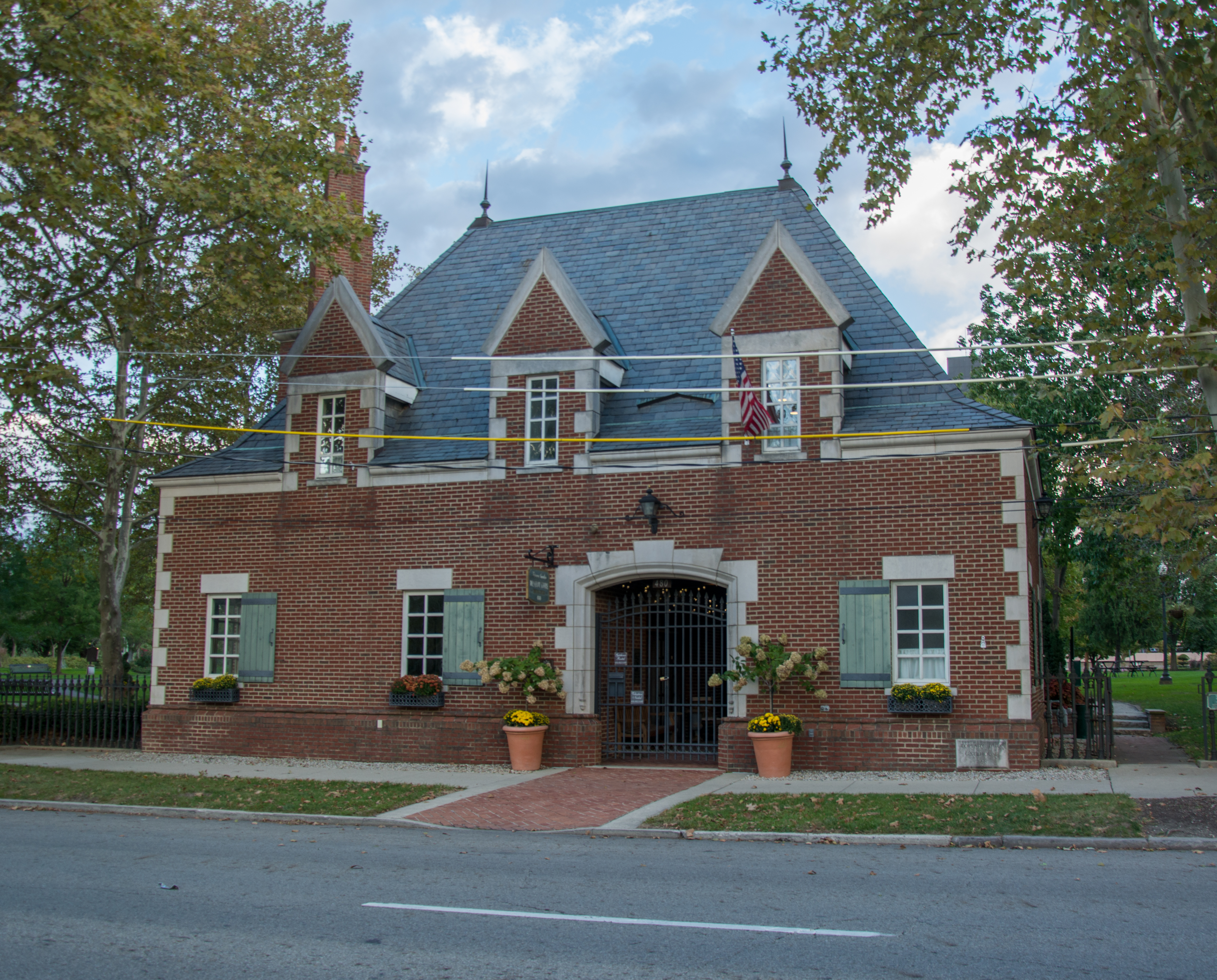
The park's gatehouse

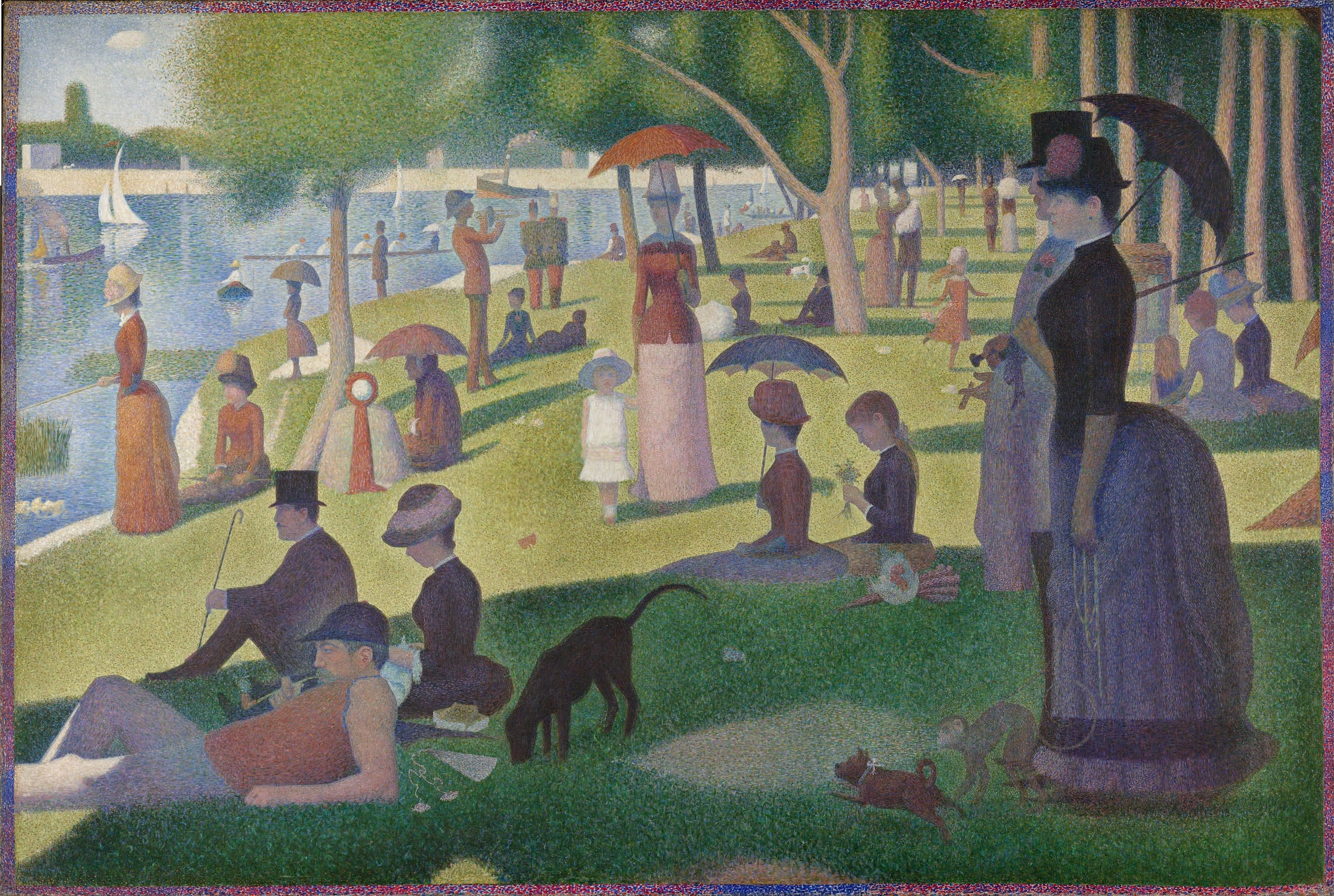
A Sunday Afternoon on the Island of La Grande Jatte

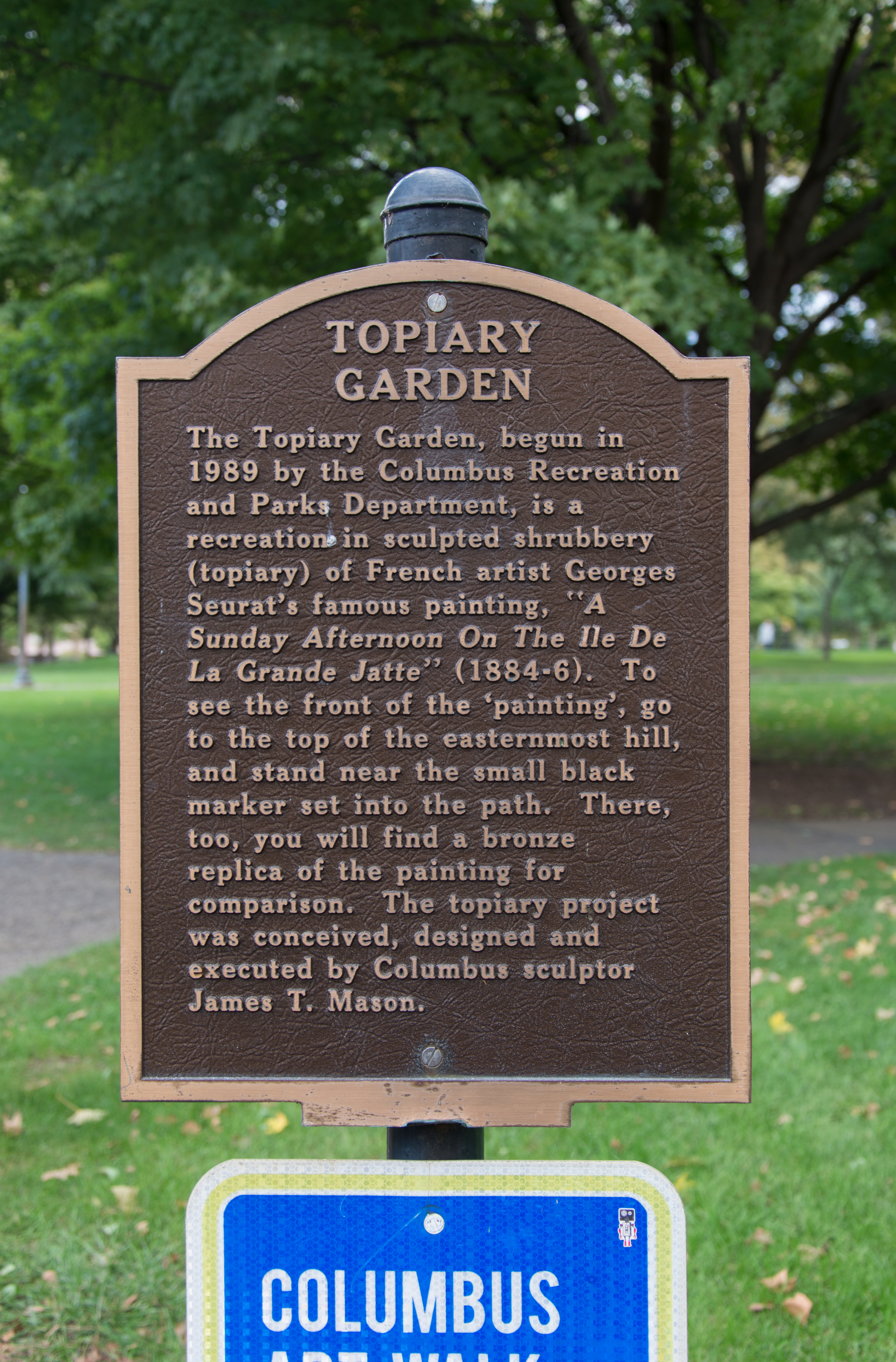
Informational sign

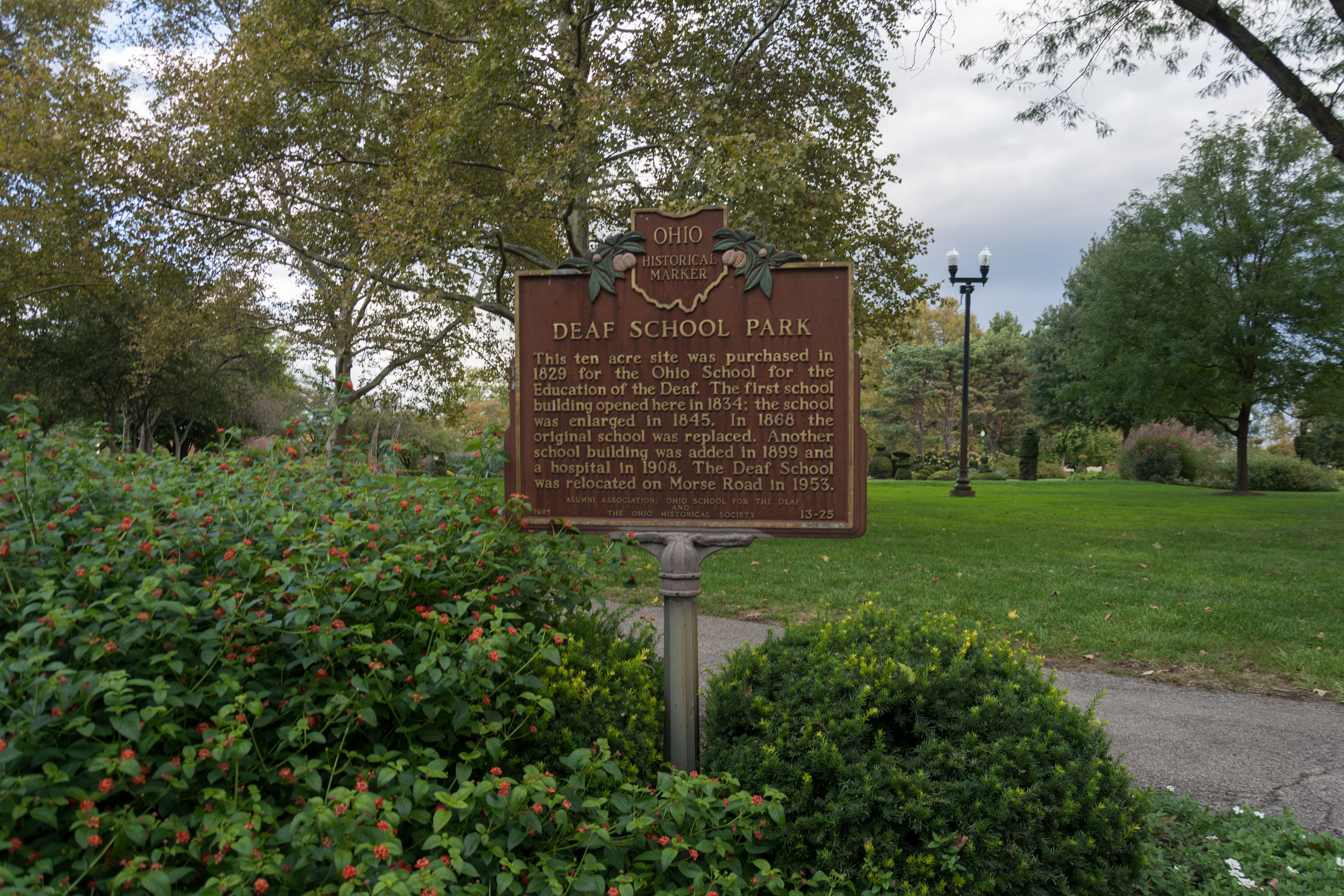
Historical marker

== See also ==
- East Town Street Historic District
- List of parks in Columbus, Ohio
