= Elaine Mason =

Elaine Mason may refer to:

- Elaine Mason, nurse and wife of physicist Stephen Hawking
- Elaine Mason, co-designer of Topiary Park in Columbus, Ohio
