= Ohio Institution for the Deaf and Dumb =

Former school campus in Columbus, Ohio

Coordinates: 39.961219°N 82.987727°W

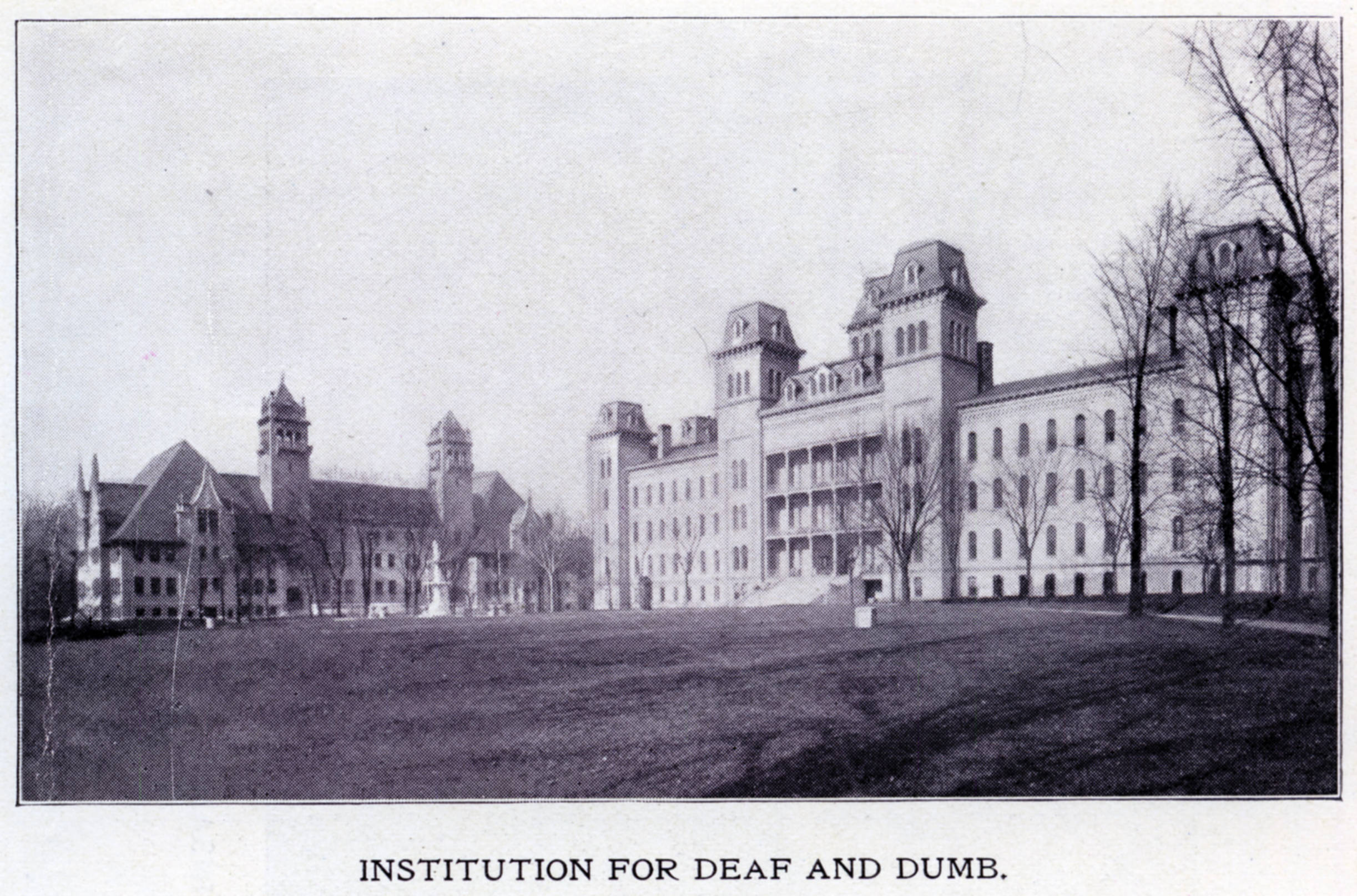
The school and main buildings c. 1900

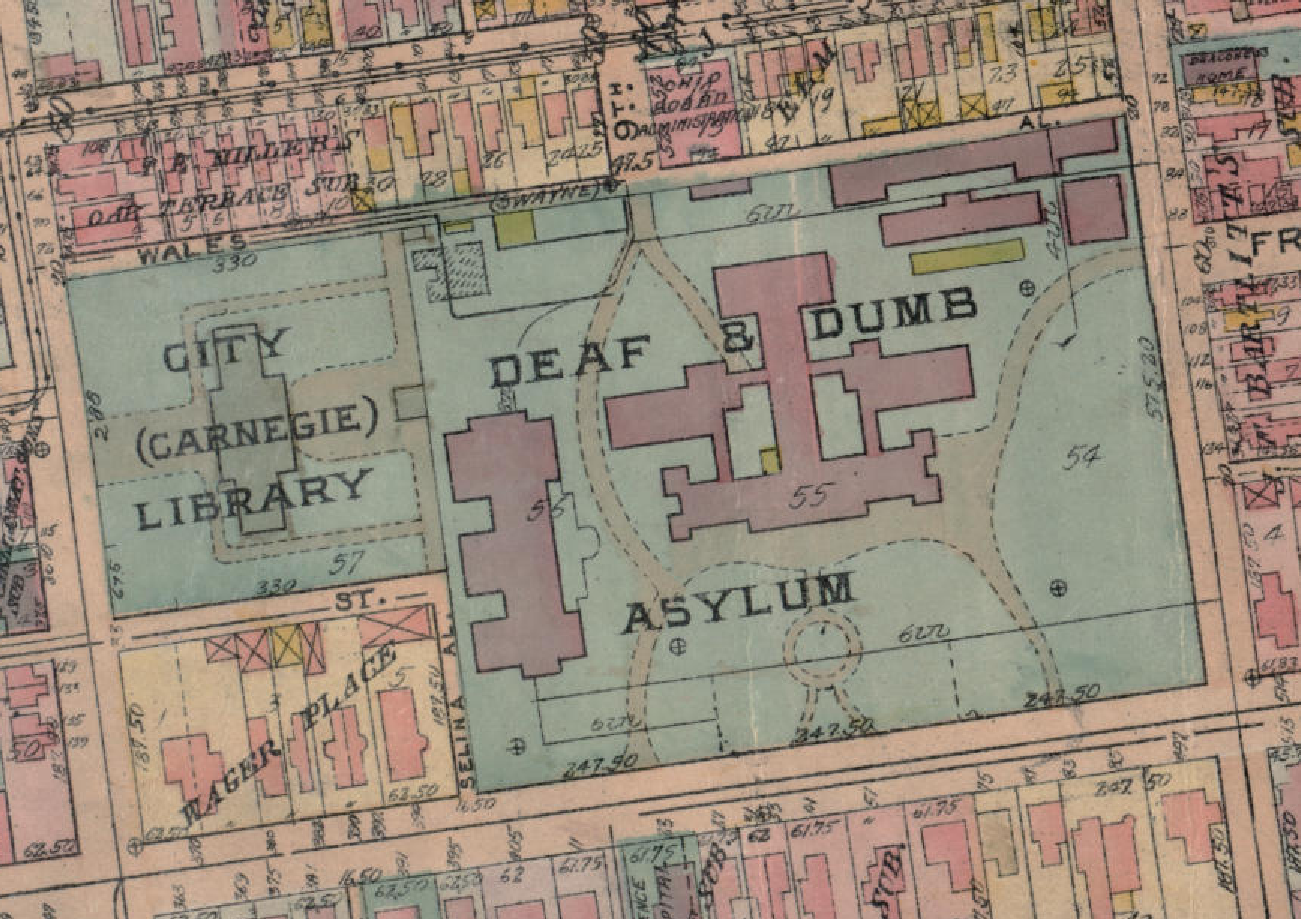
1920 map of the campus; the Main Library is at the left

The Ohio Institution for the Deaf and Dumb was a deaf school campus in Downtown Columbus, Ohio. The school, today known as the Ohio School for the Deaf, sat on the present-day Topiary Park grounds in the modern-day Discovery District. The main school building was gutted by a fire on October 2, 1981, though an existing building still stands as Cristo Rey Columbus High School. That remaining building is listed on the National Register of Historic Places and Columbus Register of Historic Properties.

The school was founded in 1829 as the Ohio Institution for the Education of the Deaf and Dumb. Within a few decades, the school purchased 10 acres (4 ha) on East Town Street. Small buildings housed the school in numerous locations, with no funds to build, and finally a new three-story building was constructed on the East Town Street property in 1832. The school moved into the space in 1834. Several additions were made to the structure in the following years. In 1868, a new building was constructed on the property and the former main building was taken down. An additional building, the current Cristo Rey Columbus High School, was completed in 1899. By 1941, with the buildings in disrepair, school administrators purchased the deaf school's current campus, and moved there in 1953. By September 1981, at least fifteen fires had taken place at the old main building, prompting fire officials to recommend demolishing the structure. The school, art, and gymnasium building was also slated for demolition; two holes had been made into it amid demolition of the main building. Preservationists saved the school building from demolition by entering and refusing to leave; architects and officials agreed it could be saved.

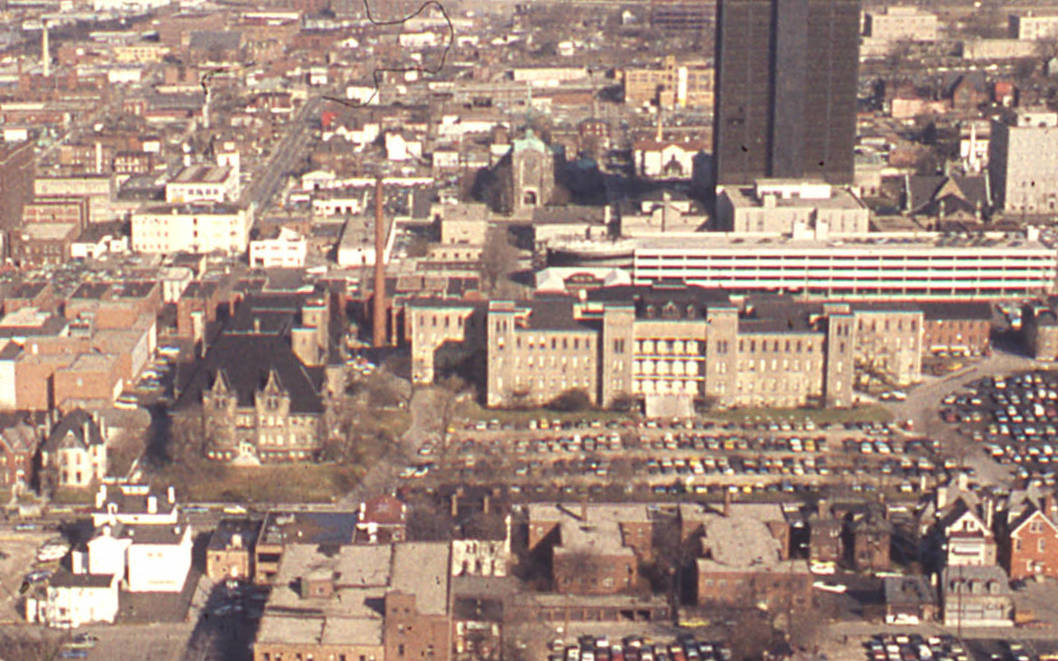
The site in 1974; roof towers were removed in 1970
