= 2011 Columbus, Ohio mayoral election =

- November 8, 2011
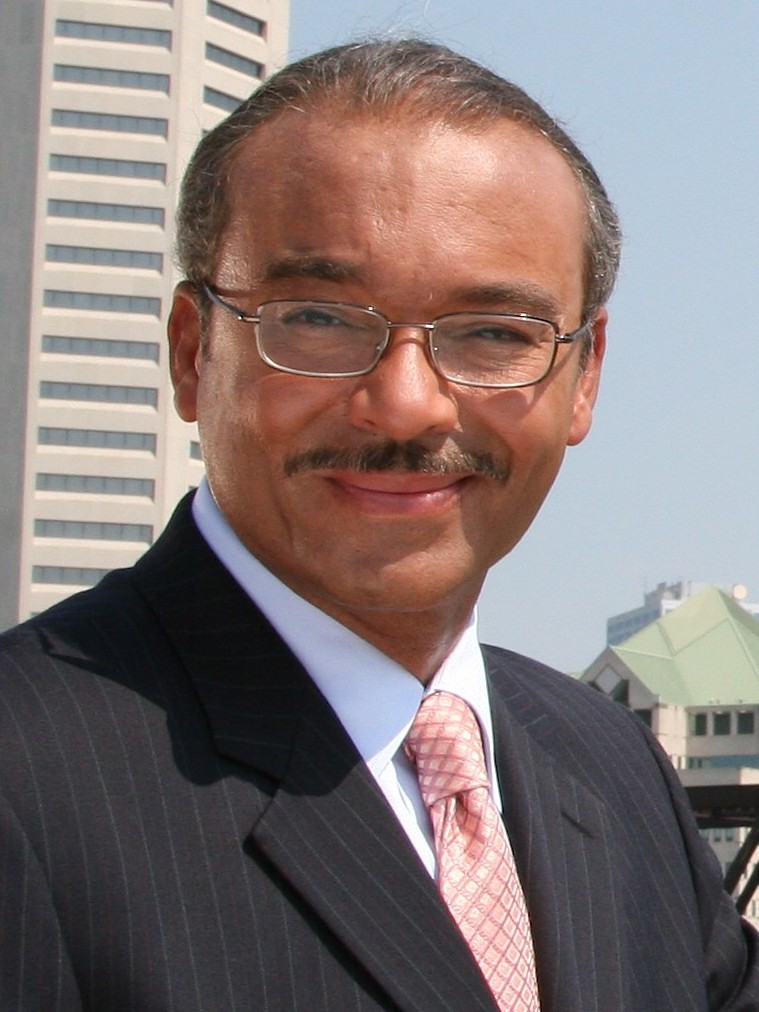

Candidate	Michael B. Coleman	Earl W. Smith
Party	Nonpartisan	Nonpartisan
Popular vote	125,273	52,945
Percentage	70.25%	29.69%
Mayor before election
Michael B. Coleman
Democratic
Elected mayor
Michael B. Coleman
Democratic

The Columbus mayoral election of 2011 was the 84th mayoral election in Columbus, Ohio. It was held on Tuesday, November 8, 2011. Incumbent mayor Michael B. Coleman defeated challenger Earl W. Smith. The scheduled nonpartisan primary was canceled because only two candidates were able to make the ballot. While the election was formally nonpartisan, Coleman was affiliated with the Democratic party while Smith was affiliated with the Republican party. Coleman was re-elected to a fourth term and became the longest-serving mayor of Columbus.

== Candidates ==
=== Michael B. Coleman ===
Michael B. Coleman (born November 18, 1954) is an American politician of the Democratic Party, the 52nd mayor of Columbus, Ohio. He is the first African-American mayor of Ohio's capital.

Coleman was born in Indianapolis, but moved to Toledo at an early age. After growing up in the Toledo area, Coleman earned a Bachelor of Arts degree in political science from the University of Cincinnati and a Juris Doctor from the University of Dayton School of Law. Coleman was a member of the Columbus City Council from 1992 to 1999, and served as president of this city council from 1997 to 1999. In 1998, Coleman was the running mate for gubernatorial candidate Lee Fisher. Coleman ran for and won the Columbus mayoralty in 1999 and was re-elected unopposed November 4, 2003.

In February 2005, Coleman announced that he would run for the Democratic nomination for governor of Ohio in the 2006 gubernatorial race, but subsequently dropped out of the race on November 29, 2005, citing heavy work and family obligations. In 2007, Mayor Coleman won a third term as mayor of Columbus.

=== Earl W. Smith ===
Earl W. Smith, a Republican, was a retired Columbus Division of Police sergeant, and the principal of E.W. Smith and Associates, a security education and consulting firm.

A 32-year police veteran, Smith held a number of high-profile positions with the Division of Police. He served as the Division's spokesperson as the uniformed supervisor for the Public Information Unit. During his years with the Crime Prevention Unit, and later as a supervisor with the Community Liaison Section within the Strategic Response Bureau, Smith represented the Division in virtually all of Columbus's neighborhoods and came to know many of the city's local community leaders. Additionally, he developed and presented crime prevention and safety programs to civic organizations, neighborhood associations and business groups.

=== Jeffrey E. Brown (write-in) ===
Jeff Brown is a native of Findlay Ohio, who moved to Columbus in 1978 to attend the Ohio State University and majored in photography and cinema. He served 12 years as a civil servant for Columbus City Schools as a video production coordinator. Brown filed in August 2011 to run as a write-in candidate in the 2011 Columbus mayoral race, but as a write-in Brown was not listed on the ballot.

== Official Results ==
Columbus mayoral election, 2011
Party	Candidate	Votes	%
Nonpartisan	Michael B. Coleman (incumbent)	125,273	70.25
Nonpartisan	Earl Smith	52,945	29.69
Write-in	Jeffrey E. Brown	106	0.06
Total votes		178,324	100
