= 2007 Columbus, Ohio mayoral election =

- November 6, 2007
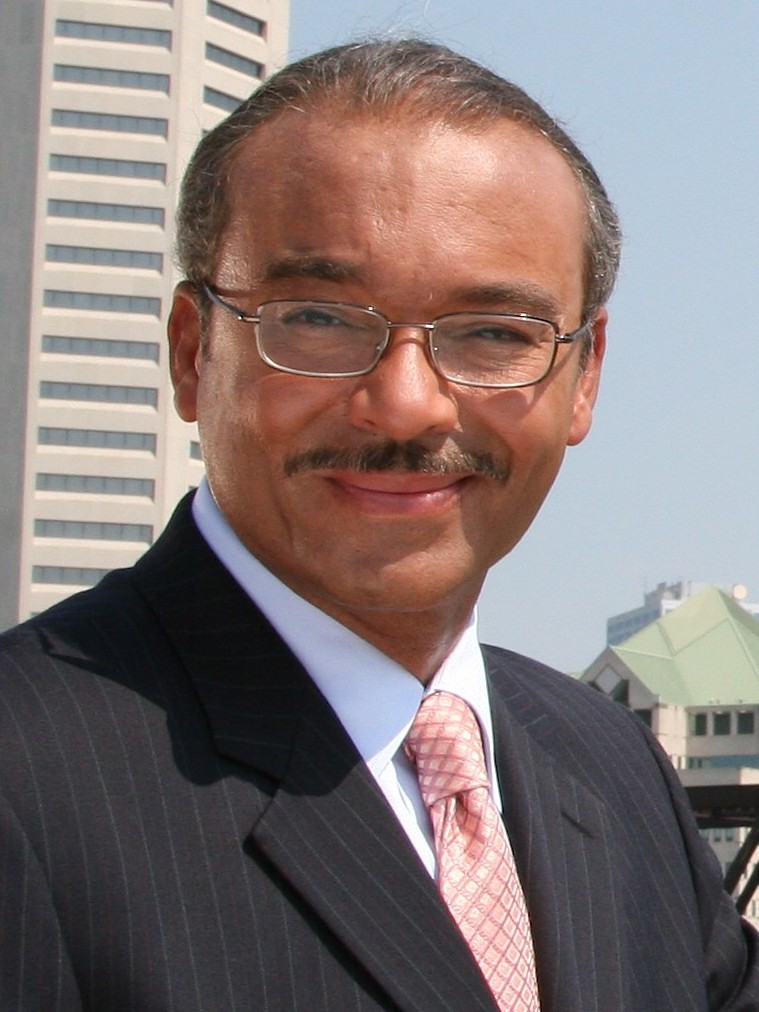

Candidate	Michael B. Coleman	Earl W. Smith
Party	Nonpartisan	Nonpartisan
Popular vote	73,758	31,838
Percentage	69.72%	30.10%
Mayor before election
Michael B. Coleman
Democratic
Elected mayor
Michael B. Coleman
Democratic

The 2007 Columbus mayoral election took place on November 6, 2007, to elect the mayor of Columbus, Ohio. The election was officially nonpartisan. Since there were fewer than three candidates, no primary was necessary.

Incumbent mayor Michael B. Coleman was reelected.

== Results ==
General election result
Party	Candidate	Votes	%
Nonpartisan	Michael B. Coleman (incumbent)	73,758	69.72
Nonpartisan	Bill Todd	31,838	30.10
Write-in	Write-ins	196	0.19
Total votes		105,792	
