= 2019 Columbus, Ohio mayoral election =

Local government in Ohio

- November 5, 2019
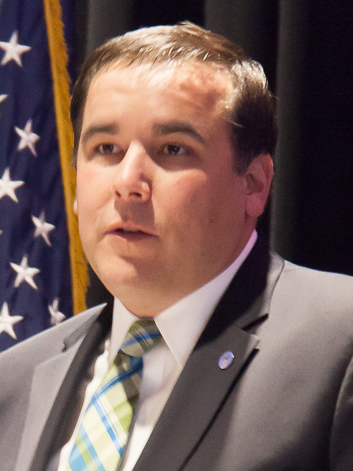

Candidate	Andrew Ginther	Write-Ins (Note: These are write-in votes cast for candidates who were not certified by the Franklin County Board of Elections.)	Jeff Leopard (write-in)
Party	Nonpartisan	Nonpartisan	Nonpartisan
Popular vote	77,096	4,845	451
Percentage	93.57%	5.89%	0.54%
Mayor before election
Andrew Ginther
Democratic
Elected mayor
Andrew Ginther
Democratic

The 2019 Columbus mayoral election took place on November 5, 2019, to elect the Mayor of Columbus, Ohio. The election was officially nonpartisan. Since there were fewer than three candidates, no primary was necessary.

Incumbent mayor Andrew Ginther ran unopposed for reelection to a second term. However, write-in votes were allowed.

== Results ==
General election result
Party	Candidate	Votes	%
Nonpartisan	Andrew Ginther (incumbent)	77,096	93.57
Write-in	Not Assigned (Note: These are write-in votes cast for candidates who were not certified by the Franklin County Board of Elections.)	4,845	5.89
Nonpartisan	Jeff Leopard (write-in)	451	0.54
