= Andrew Ginther =

53rd mayor of Columbus, Ohio, US

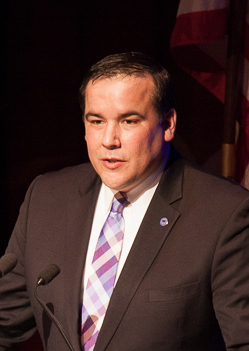
- Ginther in 2016

53rd Mayor of Columbus
- Incumbent
- Assumed office January 1, 2016
- Preceded by: Michael B. Coleman

82nd President of the United States Conference of Mayors
- In office 2024–2025
- Preceded by: Hillary Schieve
- Succeeded by: David Holt

President of Columbus City Council
- In office January 3, 2011 – December 31, 2015
- Preceded by: Michael Mentel
- Succeeded by: Zach Klein

Personal details
- Born: Andrew James Ginther; April 27, 1975 (age 51) Columbus, Ohio, U.S.
- Party: Democratic
- Spouse: Shannon Ginther
- Children: 1
- Education: Earlham College (BA)
- Website: Official website

Andrew James Ginther (born April 27, 1975) is an American politician who has served as the 53rd mayor of Columbus, Ohio since 2016. A member of the Democratic Party, he previously served as President of the Columbus City Council from 2011 until 2015.

== Early life and education ==
Ginther was born at Riverside Methodist Hospital in Columbus, Ohio. Ginther's mother was a social worker and his father was an attorney specializing in adoption and foster law. His family lived in Tallmadge, Ohio, later moving to a house on Charleston Avenue in the Clintonville neighborhood of Columbus. Ginther is one of three biological children of the couple, who fostered about 50 children over many years.

After graduation from Whetstone High School, Ginther attended Earlham College in Richmond, Indiana, where he earned a BA in Political Science in 1997. As part of Earlham's foreign study program, Ginther traveled to Northern Ireland to study peace and conflict resolution at the University of Ulster and Queen's College. He also taught at public schools in Belfast and Derry. Ginther served internships at the Carter Center in Atlanta, where he taught nonviolence and dispute resolution to children.

== Career ==
Ginther served as a legislative aide to Ohio state Senator Dan Brady. He then served as coordinator of violence prevention programs for the local nonprofit organization Strategies Against Violence Everywhere (SAVE).

=== 2001–2007: Columbus Board of Education ===
In 1999, Ginther ran unsuccessfully for a seat on the Columbus Board of Education. In 2000, Ginther worked for then-City Councilmember Maryellen O'Shaughnessy's congressional campaign for Ohio's 12th congressional district. He worked as the chief fundraiser during her unsuccessful run for Congress. In 2001 his second campaign was successful, and he served as a member of the school board for six years, being reelected in 2005. Ginther also worked for 10 years as community outreach coordinator for Triumph Communications, a central Ohio company providing public relations and political campaign management services.

=== 2007–2015: Columbus City Council ===
In February 2007, Ginther was appointed to the Columbus City Council to fill an unexpired term after the resignation of Matt Habash. He was elected to a new term as a member of City Council in November 2007, was reelected as a member in 2009, and on January 3, 2011, was selected to replace Michael C. Mentel as Council president, becoming the youngest City Council president in the history of Columbus at age 35. In 2011 Ginther accepted a new position as vice president of Community Affairs and Outreach for nonprofit Children's Hunger Alliance. He remained City Council president through the end of 2015.

=== 2016–present: Mayor of Columbus ===
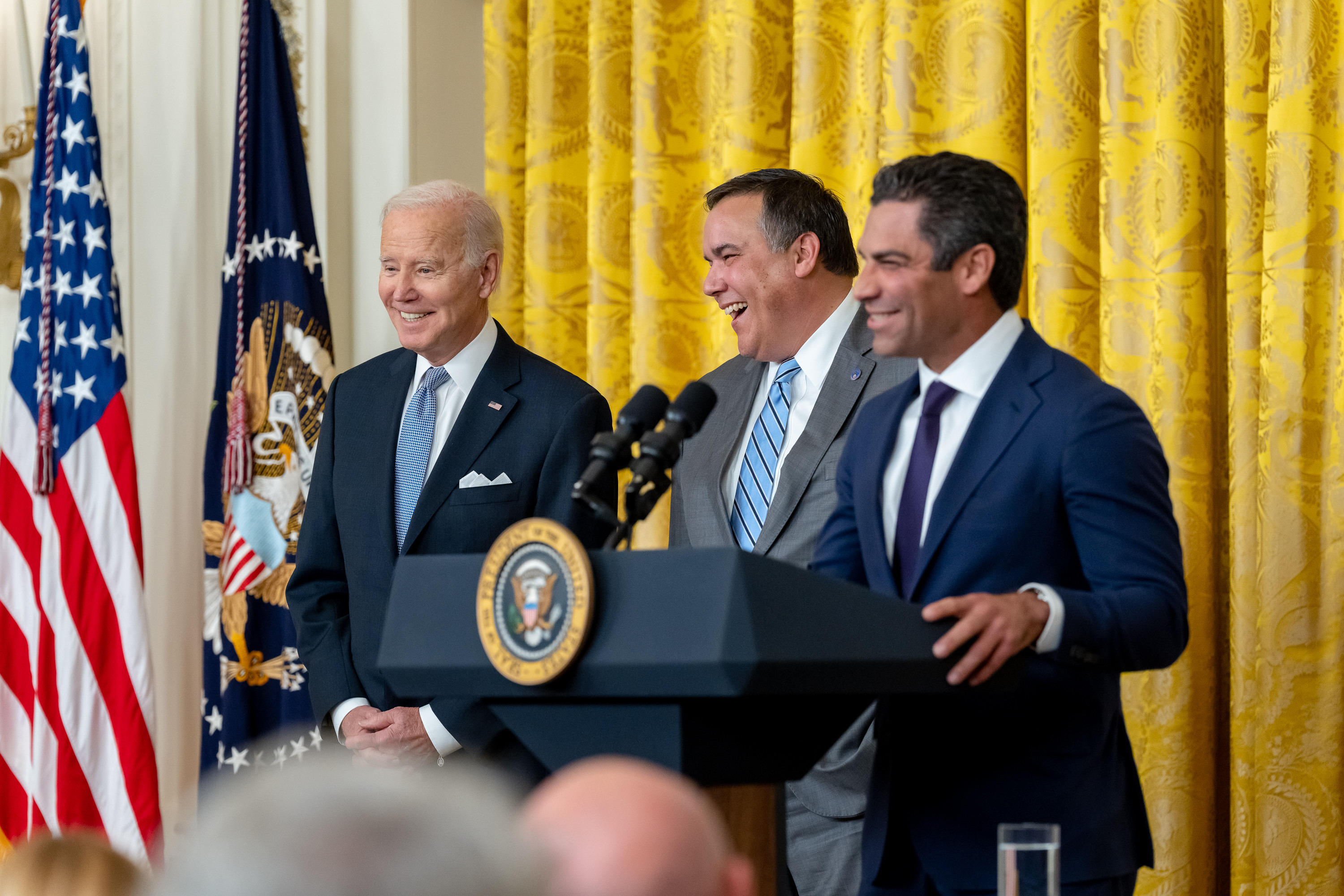
President Joe Biden, Ginther, and Francis Suarez (mayor of Miami) at a January 2023 U.S. Conference of Mayors event in the East Room of the White House

==== Elections ====
In March 2015, Ginther and fellow Democrat Zach Scott, the former Franklin County, Ohio Sheriff, were selected in a primary election by Columbus voters to compete in the November 2015 general election to replace retiring Columbus Mayor Michael B. Coleman (D). Ginther, endorsed by Coleman, was the projected frontrunner to be elected but faced controversy over issues with Redflex Traffic Systems when an executive of the company was found guilty of bribery charges in dealings with the city of Columbus. Although Ginther was never mentioned in the court documents for participating in this, Scott used the controversy to attack his campaign. Ginther beat a previous record for fundraising and spending during his campaign by raising $3 million. In the general election on November 3, 2015, Ginther defeated Scott with 59% of the vote.

In 2019, Ginther was re-elected unopposed as mayor of Columbus. When he first submitted his bid to run, he spoke about continuing and expanding the work he had done for the city during his first term. During his State of the City address in February 2020, he announced initiatives to improve the city's Sullivant Avenue corridor in Franklinton and the Hilltop.

After Ginther announced he was running for re-election for a third term in 2023, he was soon opposed by independent Joe Motil. Ginther ran his campaign based on his accomplishments in the last two terms, while Motil based his campaign on attacking Ginther for his lack of leadership, the housing crisis, rising crime rates within the city. Ginther was re-elected defeating Motil with 64% of the vote. Ginther once again outspent his opponent but received a few thousand fewer votes in this election than his previous two. In 2024, he was elected as the 82nd president of the United States Conference of Mayors, succeeding Hillary Schieve.

===== 2024 Cyberattack =====
In July 2024, the city of Columbus was the victim of a citywide cyberattack. As a result, hundreds of thousands of private citizen's information would be released on the dark web. Two separate class-action lawsuits have also been filed against the city, in order to improve security and safeguards to prevent future incidents. Since the attack, Ginther had explained that most of the stolen data was unusable. Ginther has also revealed that the city has spent $12 million on cybersecurity with plans to invest more in the future.

===== Budget =====
In November 2024, Ginther proposed a $1.23 billion general fund budget for 2025. This budget would allow plans to improve neighborhood safety, housing, and transportation. Of the $1.23 billion, $774 million would be allocated to neighborhood safety.

Ginther's Past Budgets
| Year | General Fund Budget |
|---|---|
| 2016 | $835,291,000 |
| 2017 | $872,713,000 |
| 2018 | $894,018,000 |
| 2019 | $914,153,000 |
| 2020 | $969,528,000 |
| 2021 | $970,263,958 |
| 2022 | $1,037,363,125 |
| 2023 | $1,162,941,386 |
| 2024 | $1,211,579,657 |

== Policies as Mayor ==
=== Gun Control Efforts ===
Columbus, Ohio had a dramatic increase in fatal shootings since the COVID pandemic in 2020. Forty-one percent of Columbus residents live within a quarter mile of a fatal shooting location, which is an increase from 28% pre-pandemic. Regarding gun violence, Ginther believes that this should be the city's and state's top priority. Ginther promoted more background checks and adoption of Safety Protection Orders for the city. A couple of those orders are:

- Protections for victims of domestic violence
- Initiatives for firearms off the streets and away from minors
- Violent felonies to the nuisance code of Columbus
- Prohibited firearm sales in residential zones
- Gun violence is declared a Public Health Crisis in Columbus
- Implementation of the Real Time Crime Center and Office of Violence Prevention

In November 2022, along with other Columbus leaders, Ginther proposed new legislation addressing gun safety. The proposal included several key measures, such as banning high-capacity magazines capable of holding more than 30 rounds. It also sought to penalize unsafe gun storage practices and outlaw straw purchases of firearms. Columbus City Council reviewed and approved the legislation in December 2022.

=== Climate Action ===
In 2021, Mayor Andrew Ginther and the City of Columbus released a Climate Action Plan designed to address environmental challenges and reduce the city's carbon footprint. The plan set two major goals: cutting greenhouse gas emissions by 45% by the year 2030 and achieving full carbon neutrality by 2050. To accomplish these objectives, the plan outlined several strategic initiatives.

One major focus was the expansion of solar power infrastructure, with a target of reaching 2 gigawatts (GW) of commercial on-site solar energy generation by 2050. Another priority was the electrification of transportation. The plan included the installation of numerous electric vehicle (EV) charging stations across the city and an aim to transition 100% of personal vehicle use to electric models by 2050. Additionally, the plan included making all city-owned vehicles electric by 2030, while gradually converting medium and heavy-duty vehicles to electric power by 2050.

== Administration and cabinet ==
The Ginther Cabinet
| Office | Name | Term |
|---|---|---|
| Mayor | Andrew Ginther | 2016–present |
| Chief of Staff | Greg Davies | 2016–2018 |
| Chief of Staff | Ken Paul | 2018–2024 |
| Chief of Staff | Elon Simms | 2024–present |
| Director of Development | Michael Stevens | 2019–present |
| Director of Public Utilities | Tracie Davies | 2016–2022 |
| Director of Public Utilities | Kristen Atha | 2022–present |
| Director of Public Service | Jennifer L. Gallagher, P.E. | 2016–2024 |
| Director of Public Service | Kelly Scocco | 2024–present |
| Director of Public Safety | Robert W. Clark | 2021–2023 |
| Director of Public Safety | Kate Pishotti | 2023–present |
| Director of Public Health | Teresa Long | 2016–2017 |
| Director of Public Health | Mysheika Roberts | 2017–present |
| Director of Finance & Management | Kathy Owens | 2022–2025 |
| Director of Human Resources | Nichole Brandon | 2016–2022 |
| Director of Human Resources | Chris Moses | 2022–2026 |
| Director of Technology | Sam Orth III | 2016–present |
| Director of Education | Rhonda Johnson | 2016–2019 |
| Director of Education | Matt Smydo | 2019–Present |
| Director of Recreation & Parks | Tony Collins | 2015–2019 |
| Director of Recreation & Parks | Paul Rakowsky (Interim) | 2019–Present |
| Director of Building & Zoning Services | Scott Messer | 2016–present |
| Director of Civil Service | Amy DeLong | 2016–2024 |
| Director of Civil Service | Jennifer Shea | 2024–present |

== Personal life ==
Since 2019, Ginther and his family have lived in The Knolls, a subdivision in the northwest side of Columbus.

== See also ==
- Columbus, Ohio mayoral election, 2015
- List of mayors of the 50 largest cities in the United States

Political offices
| Preceded by Michael B. Coleman | Mayor of Columbus; 2016–present | Incumbent |
