= Discovery District (Columbus, Ohio) =

Neighborhood in Columbus, Ohio

- Neighborhoods of Columbus, Ohio
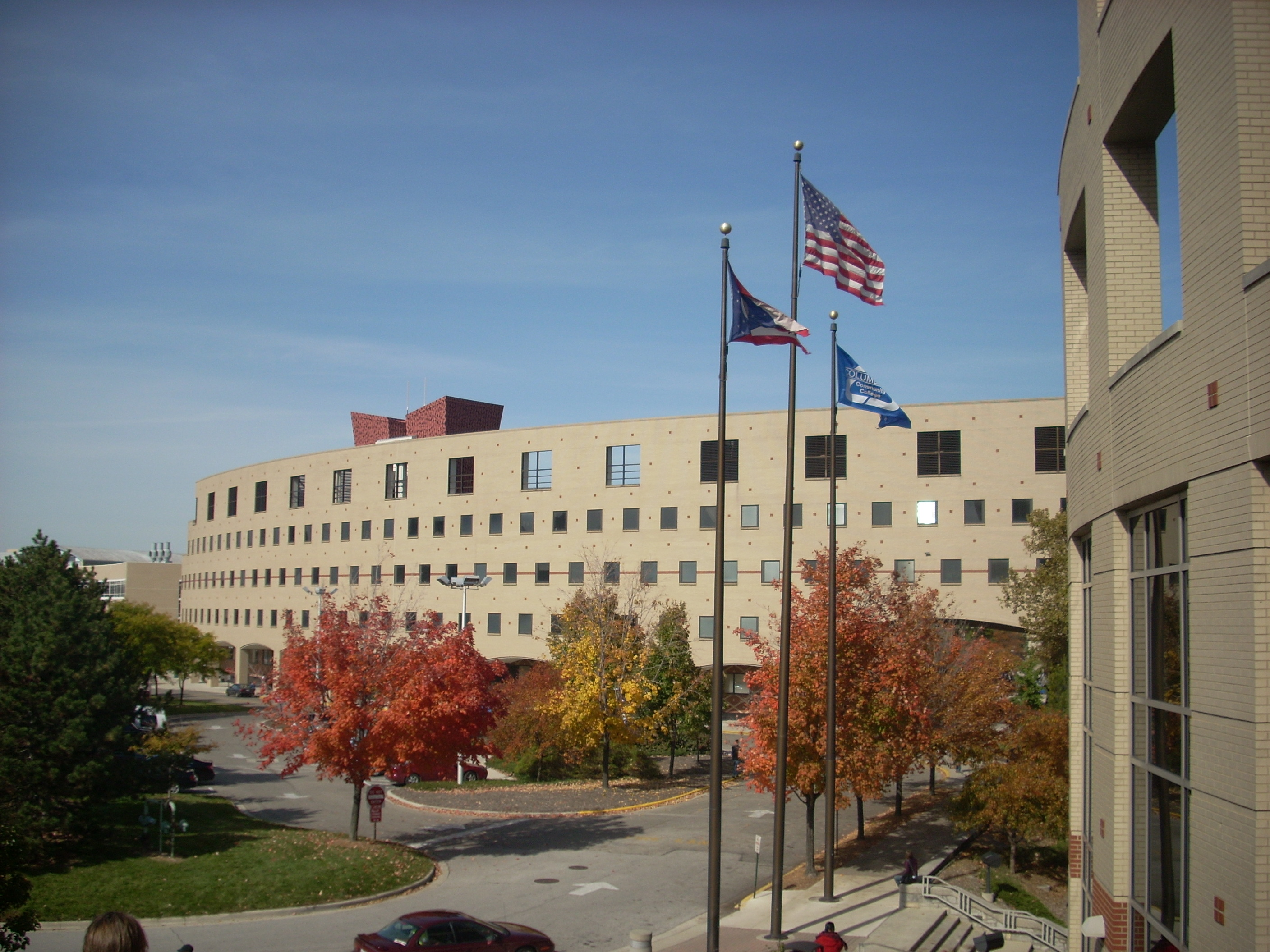
- Columbus State Community College in the Discovery District
- Interactive map of Discovery District
- Coordinates: 39.963500°N 82.989977°W
- ZIP Code: 43215
- Area code: 614

The Discovery District is a special improvement district in downtown Columbus, Ohio, the home of Columbus State Community College, Columbus College of Art and Design, Columbus Museum of Art, and Columbus Metropolitan Library. It is considered a cultural district because of its close proximity to higher educational campuses and art destinations. It was named to imply that the area is full of possibility due to the number of learning and creative campuses in this small area. "Culture, art, and academia converge and present the Discovery District." While not typically viewed as the most prominent Columbus neighborhood, the density of academic and arts-based institutions in this area are what make this creative campus unique.

== History ==
The Discovery Special Improvement District was created in 2007. As a special improvement district (SID), its property owners have agreed to pay a special tax to help maintain the area and keep it clean and safe. The services they are paying for include employing safety ambassadors, a homeless outreach specialist, and a safety coordinator. They also pay to have first-floor graffiti removed and to promote the area through PR and communications publications in various outlets throughout the city, to promote visitors and make the area a downtown Columbus destination. Before the Discovery District was an SID, it was considered an unsafe area of the city, and officials recognized the need for something to be done, especially with a large student demographic in the area attending either Columbus State Community College or the Columbus College of Art and Design.

In 2007, a board of directors overseeing two private, non-profit organizations, the Columbus Downtown Development Corporation (CDDC) and the Capitol South Community Urban Redevelopment Corporation (Capitol South), made this area their new project. These two organizations have backed multiple special improvement districts in the Columbus area, including the Discovery District and the Capitol Crossroads Special Improvement District. The CDDC was formed in 2002 in order to implement the Downtown Strategic Plan while Capitol South was formed earlier, in 1974, to redevelop the area south of Capitol Square.

Other buildings in the area remain historic landmarks and were in place long before the Discovery District was given its name. These include the Kelton House, the First Congregational Church on Broad Street, and the Broad Street United Methodist Church.

== Special Improvement District ==
The main priorities of the Discovery Special Improvement District are to eliminate disorder and prevent crime. Around 80% of revenue raised from the district is directed towards these goals. Some safety improvements made to the district include creation of safety ambassadors, the hiring of a specialty police force, and the establishment of a full-time outreach program. Through the safety ambassadors program, security guards from the major institutions in the district have joined forced to "close the gaps" in the district. The ambassadors created a security network in which they can easily communicate with each other. The security guards also meet every two months to check up with each other and make sure that the correct pathways of communication are in place. The specialty police force also enhances security in the district. This police force consists of a number of beat cops focused on crime solely within the Discovery District. The force is extremely effective and guarantees a quick response to any safety threats. Lastly, the Discovery's outreach program has provided support to the homeless in the area. This program connects the homeless with jobs and rehabilitation centers that are necessary to those requiring help.

Some common crime occurrences before the creation of the SID included camping, panhandling, defecation, and auto theft. Now, the district experiences limited crime due to the heightened security. The safety improvements were so revolutionary that the SID received the Homeland Security Award in 2014.

The remaining 20% of revenue is dedicated to marketing for the district and for seasonal events.

== Geography ==
=== Boundaries ===
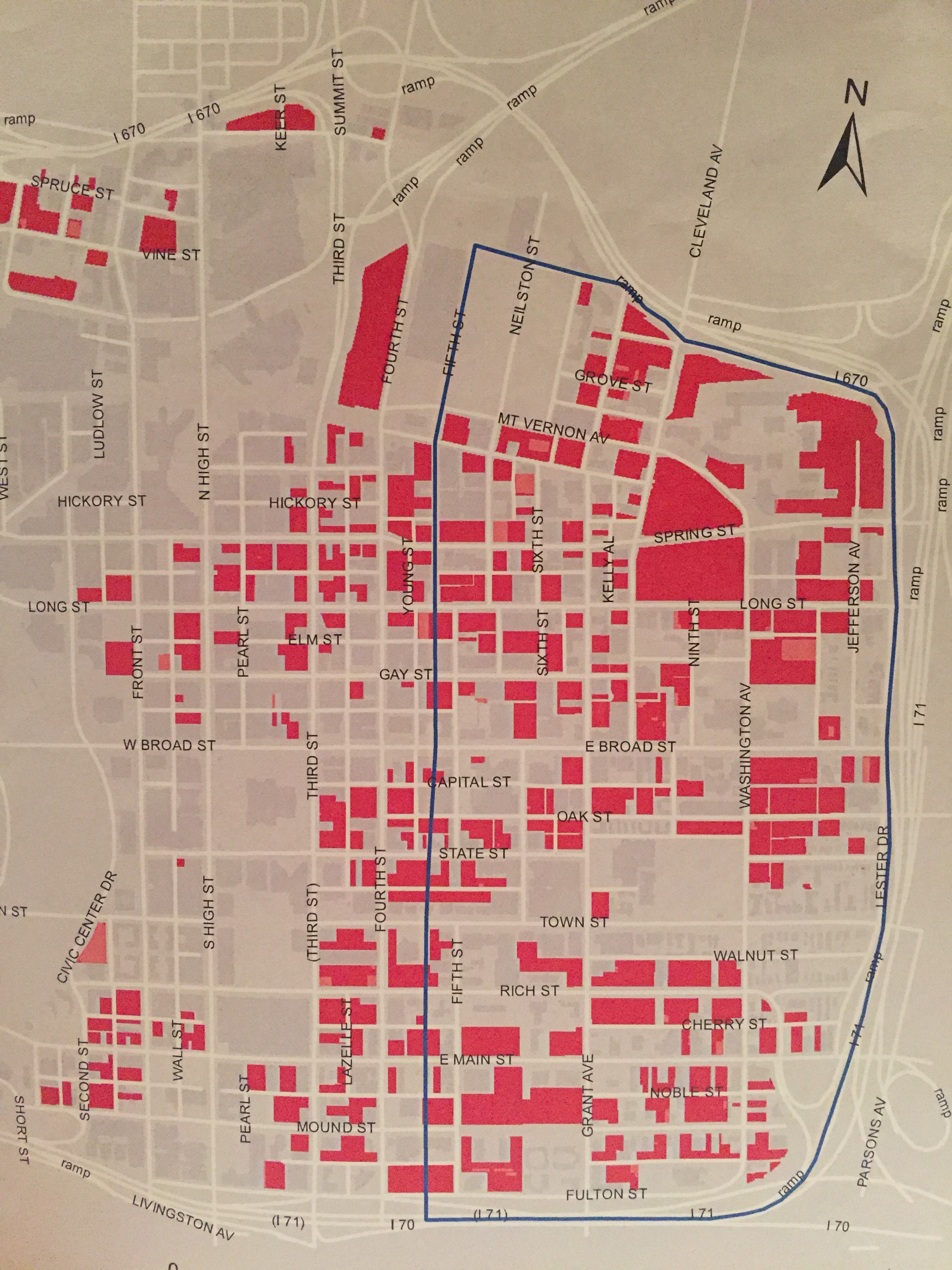
An outline of the Discovery District with red areas as an indication of parking lots located in the district in 2015

The Discovery District has slightly varying boundaries depending on the source. The Discovery District is bounded to the north by I-670, to the east by Jefferson Avenue and Lester Drive, to the south in a zig-zag pattern until it reaches I-70, and then to the west by South Grant Avenue.

=== Buildings and landmarks ===
This district is home to various cultural and educational institutions. The Columbus Metropolitan Library, one of the highest-ranking large-city libraries in the nation, is an example of this. Its main branch location is within the bounds of the Discovery District. The Columbus Museum of Art is another example and is home to a wide array of American and European Art, as well as many contemporary and photographic collections.

Among its educational institutions are the Columbus College of Art and Design, Columbus State Community College, Franklin University, and Capital University Law School. The Columbus College of Art and Design is a nationally ranked school for the arts, while Columbus State Community College is a community college in the area, with many of its students beginning there and then transferring through to a four-year school in Columbus, such as Ohio State University, Otterbein University, or Ohio Dominican University, or another school in Ohio.

The Kelton House is a Greek Revival and Italianate mansion in the Discovery District that was converted to a museum by the Junior League of Columbus "to promote an understanding of daily life, customs, and decorative arts in 19th century Columbus and to educate visitors about the Underground Railroad."

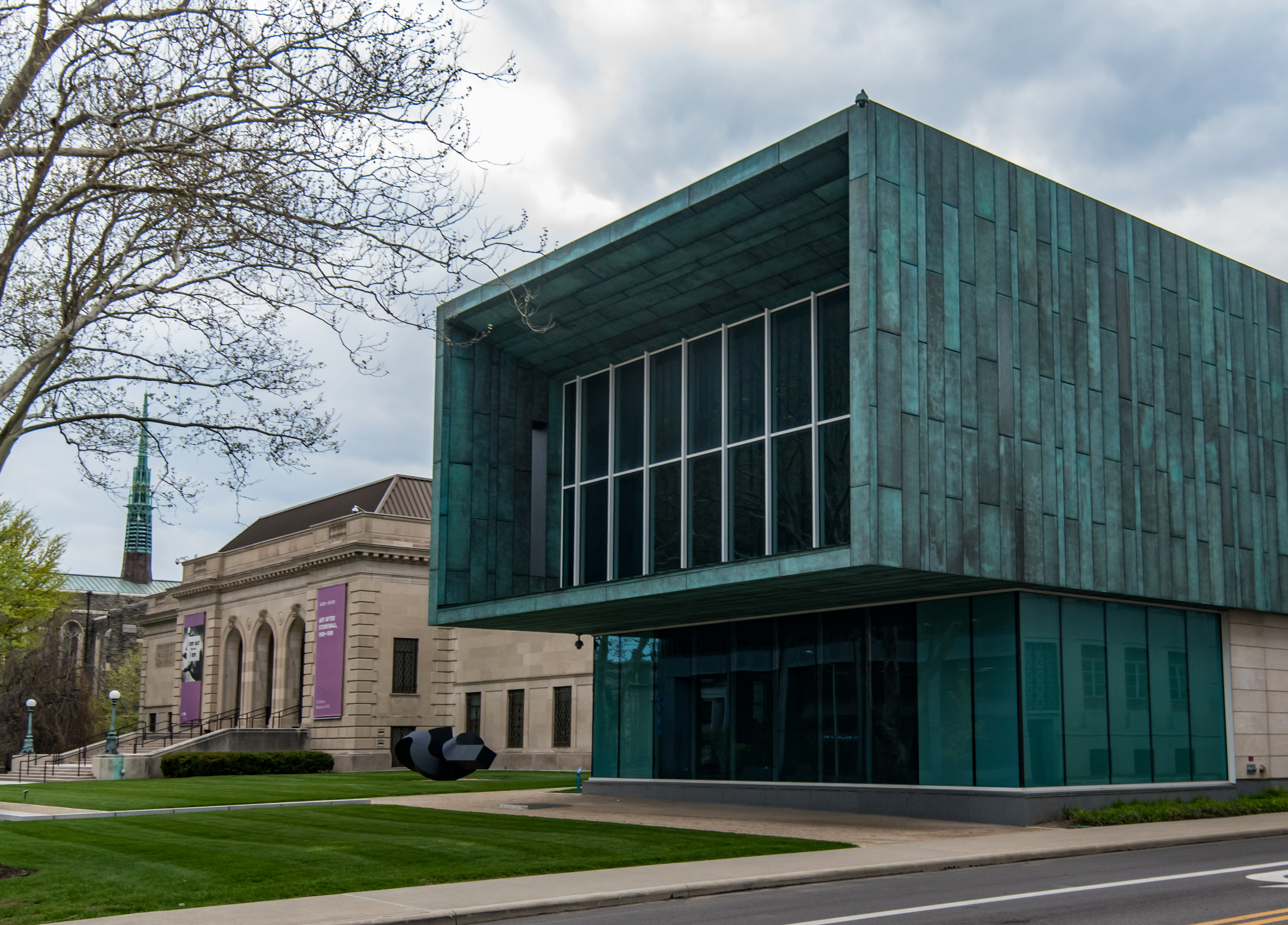
The Columbus Museum of Art

The area also contains several religious institutions including The First Congregational Church on Broad Street and Broad Street United Methodist Church.

=== Residential ===
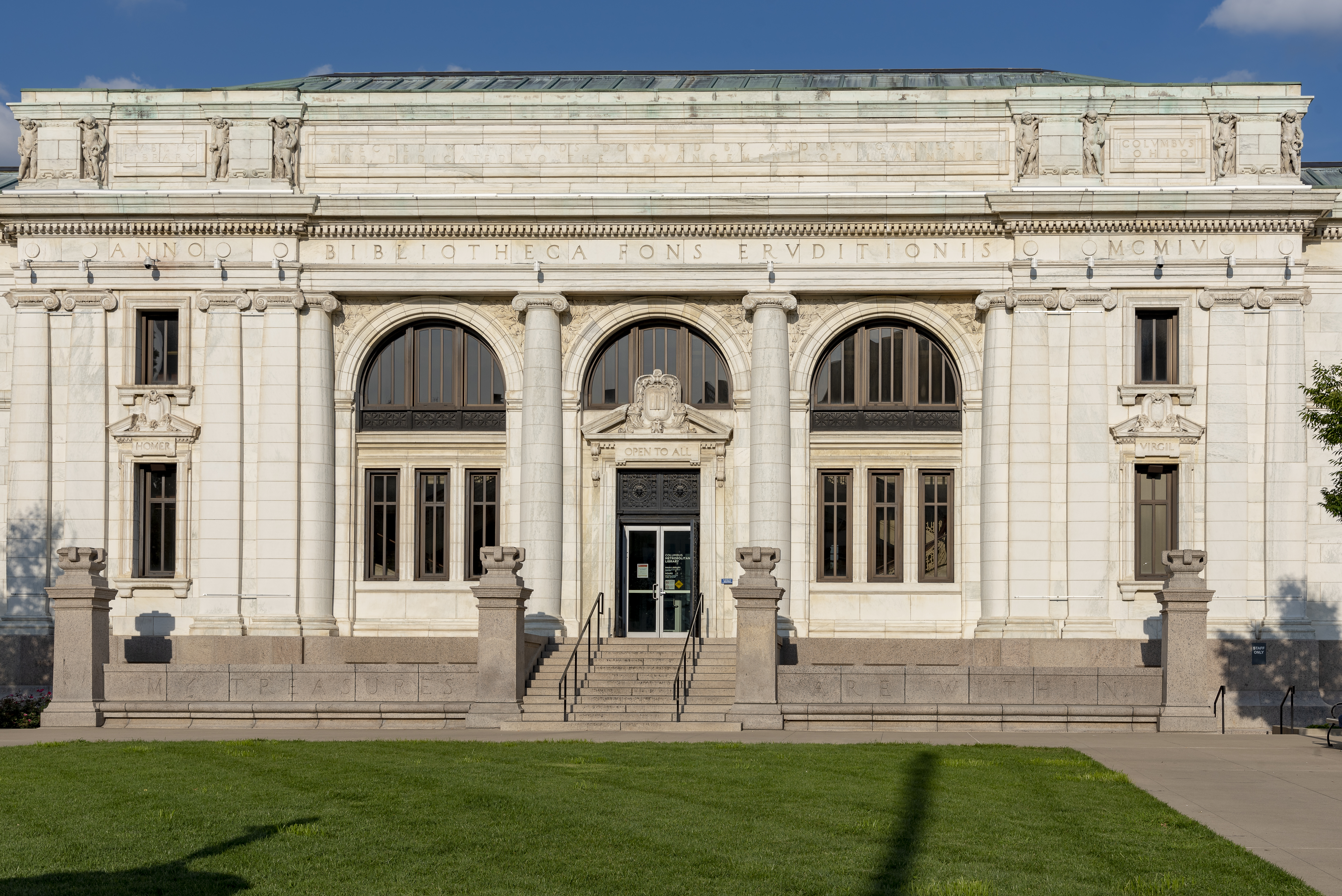
The Columbus Metropolitan Library's main branch

The majority of residents in the Discovery District reside in apartment-style buildings. This is due to the urban setting and the student-heavy population; many of these apartments are listed online as "luxury student housing." These include more than ten buildings, each multiple stories.

Another large portion of land in the Discovery District goes towards parking lots for the many apartment buildings, as well as those servicing many of the higher education buildings, Columbus State Community College, Columbus College of Art and Design, Franklin University, Capital University Law School, or the Columbus Museum of Art.

=== Parks ===
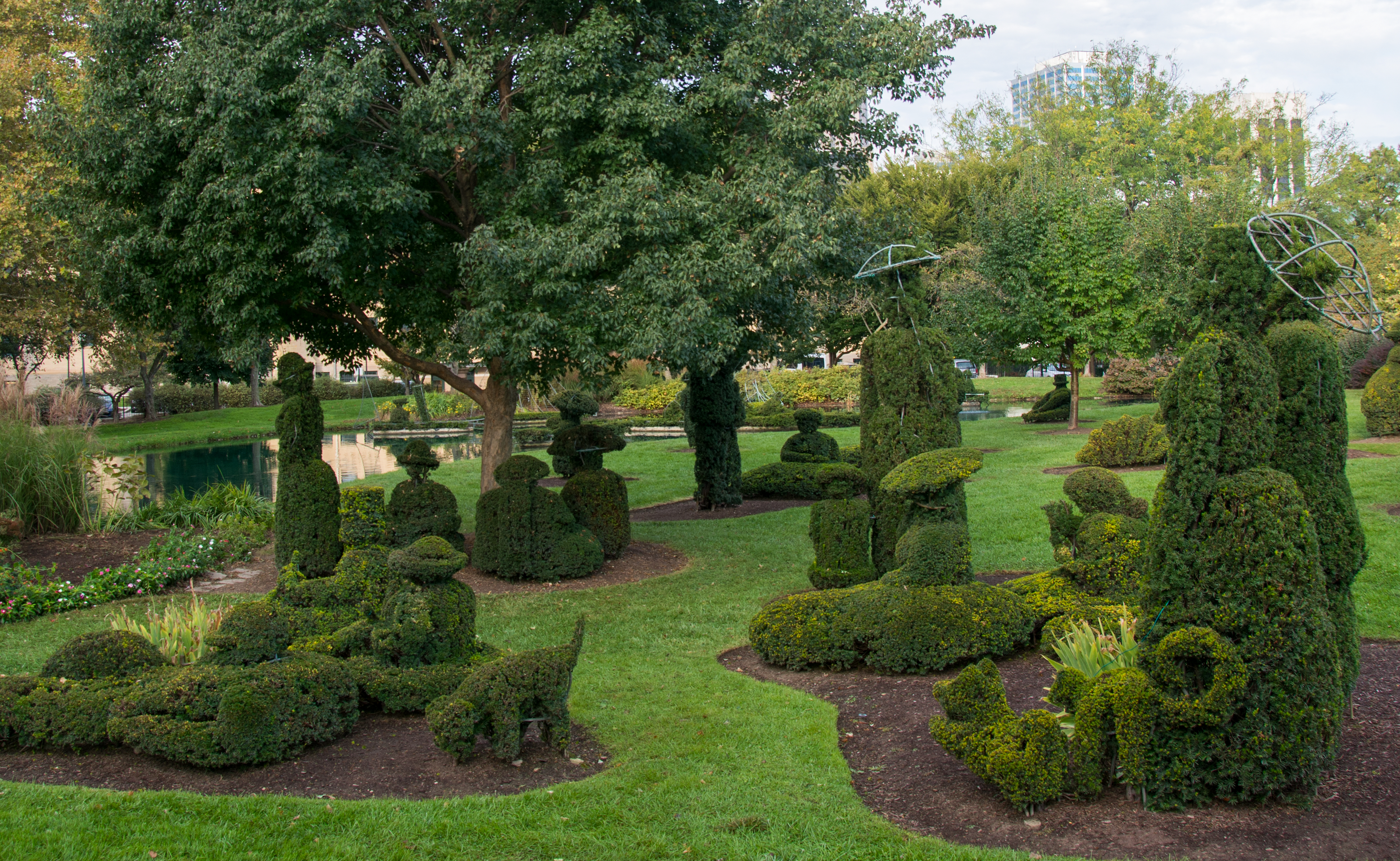
Topiary Park in Discovery District

The Discovery District is home to the Topiary Park and Thurber Park. Topiary Park, otherwise known as The Old Deaf School Park, began construction in 1988 and uses topiaries to represent Georges Seurat's painting, A Sunday Afternoon on the Island of La Grand Jatte. The park is seven acres and is home to 67 separate topiary figures, more than 220 trees, and a pond. The Thurber Park is an oval piece of grass set across from the Thurber House, temporary residence of James Thurber, on Jefferson Street. The park is half an acre and contains a gazebo, walkways, and trees.

== Commercial ==
=== Dining ===
The Discovery District is home to multiple restaurants, including a variety of cuisines. These dining options have helped to keep people in the area after business hours to eat dinner, whereas without these amenities, the district was formerly a "ghost town" after the Columbus Metropolitan Library and Columbus Art Museum closed for the day.

== Events and entertainment ==
The district is one of the many hosts to the annual Columbus Art Walks, a series of self-guided walking and audio tours through Columbus's downtown districts. Among its many destinations are the locations listed above. According to the Columbus Art Walks website, "The Discovery District Art Walk will lead you through the Northeastern portion of Downtown Columbus. Experience Columbus' Creative Campus where Columbus State Community College, Columbus College of Art and Design, and several downtown arts and cultural institutions all converge. You will find hidden murals on buildings, artistic surprises in parks, historic architectural landmarks, and much more!"

The district also hosts seasonal events to bring people to the area around the winter holiday season, including one called the Holiday Trolley Hop, a tour of the district by trolley in the evening, with stops for activities, crafts, tours, and shopping. One year, the Hop took visitors to Topiary Park, Kelton House, Bosco Center, Columbus Museum of Art, Hills Market Downtown, Thurber House, and the State Auto Nativity Display.

The district hosts the Topiary Theater Summer Movie Series. The district partners with the Columbus Metropolitan Library and the Gateway Film Center to put on a book-to-film series in Topiary Park, next to the Ohio School for the Deaf.

The Discovery District also creates sand volleyball courts in the summer as a part of "Discovery Beach". The beach is located at 100 N. Grant Avenue and is open and free to volleyball players all summer long. The YMCA hosts a spring and summer volleyball league at the beach as well.
