= Michael G. Morris =

American businessman

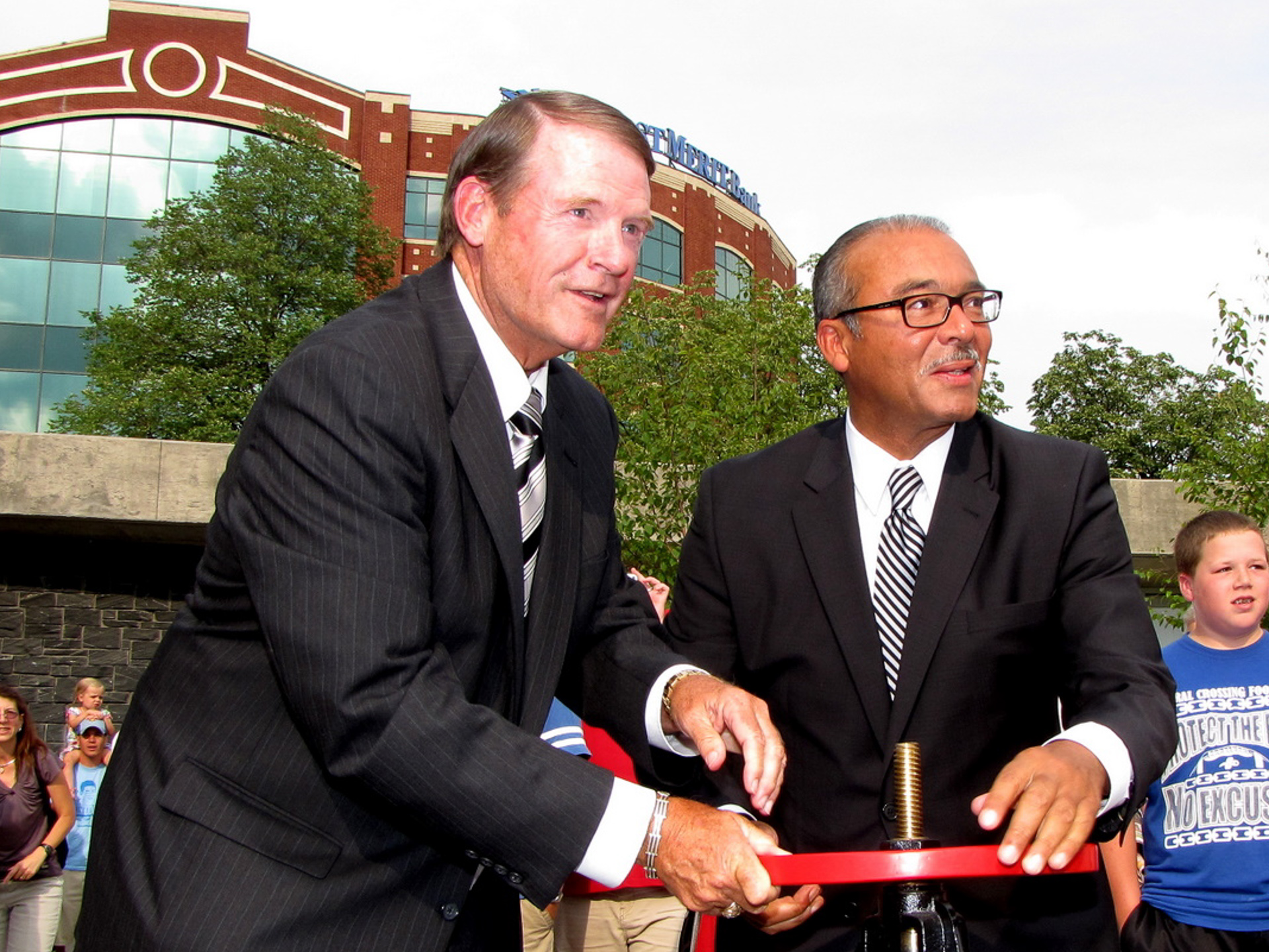
Michael Morris (left) and Columbus, Ohio Mayor Michael B. Coleman (right) open the valve to inaugurate the new AEP Fountain at the reopening of Bicentennial Park in Columbus on July 7, 2011.

Michael G. Morris (born 1947 in Fremont, Ohio) is a former president, chief executive officer, and chairman of Columbus, Ohio-based American Electric Power, one of the USA's largest generators of electricity, from 2004 to November 2011, and continued as AEP's chairman until 2013. As of November 2015, he remains a member of the Board of Directors of Alcoa.

Morris received both his undergraduate degree and his M.S. degree in Biology from Eastern Michigan University. He followed this with a J.D. degree from the Detroit College of Law.

Morris' first major executive positions were as executive vice president of marketing, transportation and gas supply for Jackson, Michigan-based Consumers Energy, and as president of Colorado Interstate Gas Company (CIG). Morris also founded and served as president of ANR Gathering Company, one of the first natural gas marketing companies in the United States.

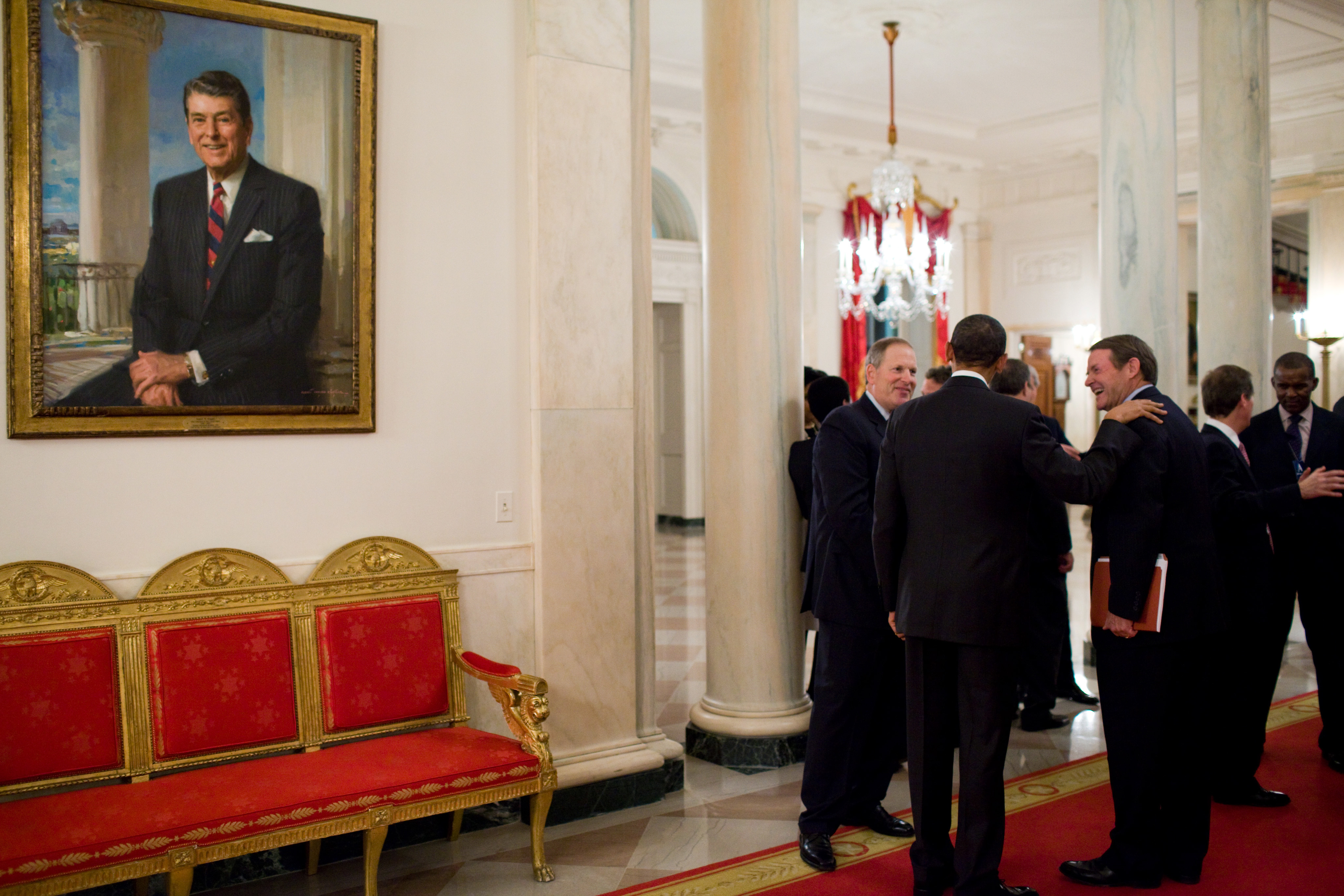
President Barack Obama talks with Michael G. Morris, right, of American Electric Power Company, and David Cote, of Honeywell International Inc., in the Cross Hall of the White House, before a dinner with CEOs, February 24, 2010.

From 1997 until taking the chairmanship of AEP, Morris served as the chairman, president and chief executive officer of the Hartford, Connecticut-based Northeast Utilities, the largest utility system in New England. .

In December 2010, Morris was succeeded as president of AEP by Nicholas K. Akins. Morris remained CEO and chairman of AEP's board. In November 2011, Akins also succeeded Morris as CEO, on Morris' retirement as an officer of the company. In January 2014, Akins was elected chairman of the board, bringing Morris' service to the company to a close.

Morris has served on the boards of several major corporations and government advisory groups. He has also served on the Board of Regents of Eastern Michigan University from 1997-2004.

== Compensation ==
While CEO of American Electric Power in 2009, Michael G. Morris earned a total compensation of $7,092,788, which included a base salary of $1,254,808, stocks granted worth $5,265,750, as well as $572,230 in other compensation.
