= Ohio School for the Deaf =

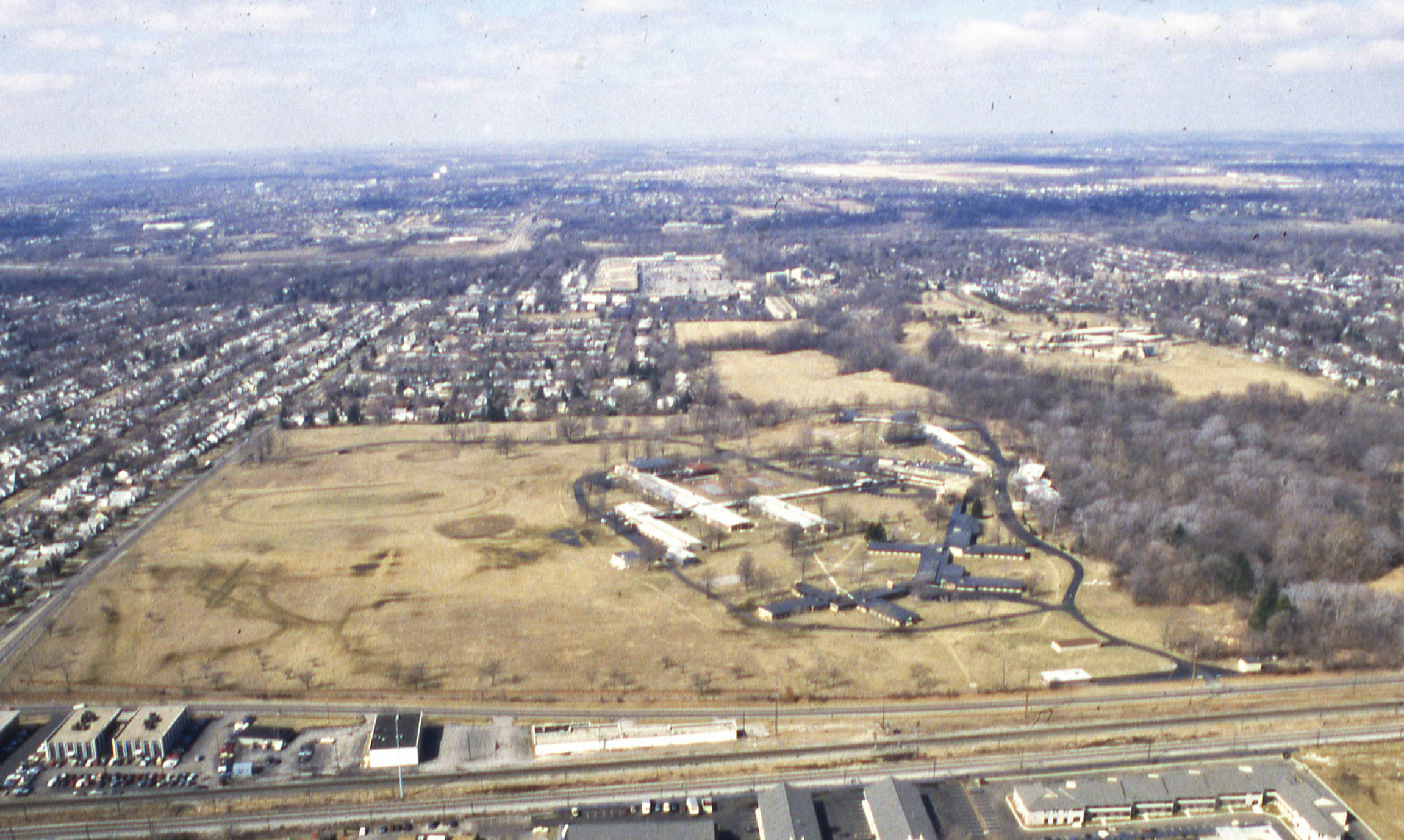
- Aerial view of the campus, 1988

Location
- 500 Morse Road; Columbus, Ohio 43214; United States; 40°3′58″N 83°0′17″W

Information
- Type: Public high school
- Established: October 16, 1829; 196 years ago
- Superintendent: Lou Maynus
- Director: Joshua Doudt
- Grades: Pre-K–12-(4 plus) after graduate
- Colors: Royal Blue and White
- Slogan: the ultimate in total education since 1829...
- Athletics conference: Eastern Schools for the Deaf Athletic Association
- Mascot: Spartan
- Team name: Spartans
- Accreditation: North Central Association of Colleges and Schools
- Website: osd.ohio.gov

The Ohio School for the Deaf is a school located in Columbus, Ohio. It is run by the Ohio Department of Education for deaf and hard-of-hearing students across Ohio. It was established on October 16, 1829, making it the fifth oldest residential school in the country. OSD is the only publicly funded residential school for the deaf in Ohio.

The mission of the Ohio School for the Deaf, an educational facility and resource center on deafness, is:

- to provide comprehensive education for Ohio's Deaf and Hard-of-Hearing students which encourages independence and lifelong learning to promote social development and cultural awareness
- to prepare students to attain their potential and become contributing members of their communities
- to collaborate with schools and other educational programs serving Deaf and Hard-of-Hearing students and their families to meet the individual needs of each student
- all via a barrier-free communication environment using American Sign Language (ASL) and English.

Before moving to the school's current location in Clintonville's Beechwold-Sharon Heights area, the school campus was in Downtown Columbus, and was known as the Ohio Institution for the Deaf and Dumb. The school's main building there was demolished in 1981, though another still stands, now used as Cristo Rey Columbus High School.

Ohio School for the Deaf helped spark small cottage industries in Ohio to meet the needs of the deaf community, including Keepsake Theme Quilts.

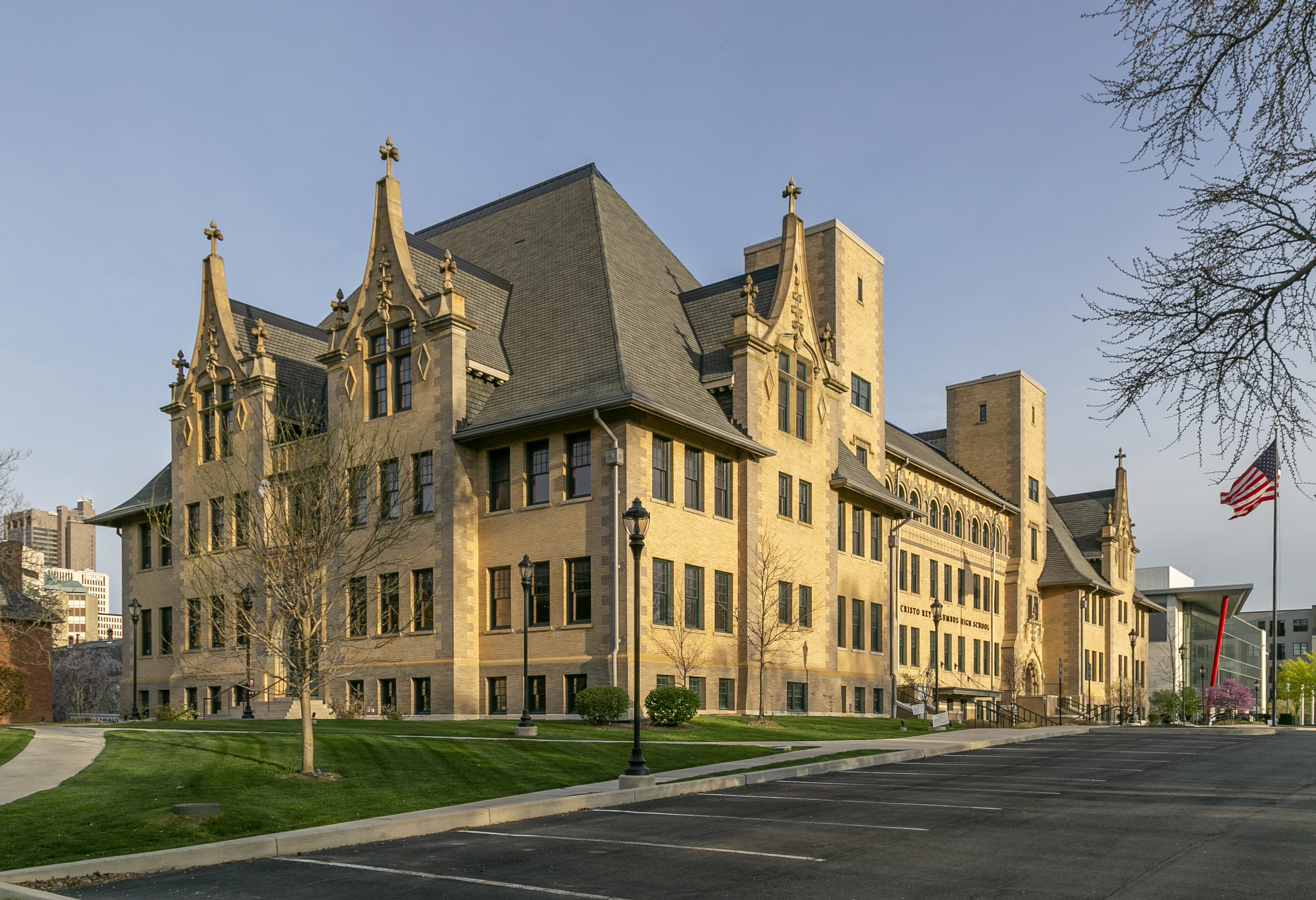
Part of the previous location of the school, now Cristo Rey Columbus High School

== See also ==
- Kohs block design test
- Ohio State School for the Blind
