= Keepsake Theme Quilts =

Deaf-employing quilting non-profit

- Keepsake T-shirts Quilts & Blankets
- Formation: 1998; 28 years ago
- Founder: Meredith Crane
- Type: Nonprofit
- Legal status: 501(c)(3) organization
- Purpose: Provide funds, employment and autonomy for deaf and hard-of-hearing individuals
- Location: Bexley, Ohio, United States
- Region served: United States
- Products: hand-quilt patchwork quilts
- Affiliations: Campus Quilt Co.
- Website: www.tshirtquilts.com

Keepsake Theme Quilts is an American non-profit business located in Bexley, Ohio founded with the intention of giving more jobs and autonomy to deaf workers. They hand-quilt patchwork quilts using t-shirts, towels, or other old mementos from road races, alma mater logos, and just anything people would like to save in quilt form.

As of 2021, they had made over 15,000 quilts and blankets, and employed over 125 deaf and hard-of-hearing individuals.

== History ==
Meredith Crane founded Keepsake Theme Quilts in 1998 as a way to earn money for her nonprofit organization Deaf Initiatives. Crane had two sons who were born deaf who encountered frequent discrimination, so it became her mission to employ deaf individuals.

"I wanted to have a business where people could come in and communicate without any barriers," Crane said. "I wanted a process, where it had a beginning, an end, where it was hands-on." T-shirt quilts seemed to fit, as they require a specific skill and attention to detail to make, and the finished product is tangible and meaningful. The quilts have now become popular for graduation and holiday gifts.

As of 2011, they had 23 deaf employees who work as seamstresses and production assistants and two certified ASL interpreters who work primarily with customers. Three quilters outside Keepsake Theme Quilts bind the pieces together with machines that wouldn't fit in the house. They have developed a system tailored to those who can't hear, like using pictures in place of numbers and words, or instructions that are drawn instead of written.

There are multiple employees who've said that working at Keepsake Theme Quilts changed their lives. For instance, office manager Shonna Collins had only been able to find work stocking shelves at Kmart, working third shift, where she said she felt alone and left out. "Now, Collins-who graduated valedictorian from the Kentucky School for the Deaf before attending the all-deaf Gallaudet University in Washington, D.C.-practically runs the business, managing fabric inventory, placing orders, handling shipments, hiring new employees and inspecting finished products before they're sent home to customers. She has her own office with two computers. She says she's proud of her career and that this job, which she earned after several internal promotions, has helped her realize her potential," reports journalist Michelle Sullivan for the Columbus Monthly.

There has been room for promotion. For instance, seamstress Judy Bryant became a supervisor.

Keepsake Theme Quilts also offers classes to members of the public interested in learning more about quilting.

During the 2020 COVID-19 pandemic, demand grew as more people with more time at home cleaned out their closets.
