= Michael B. Coleman =

American politician (born 1954)

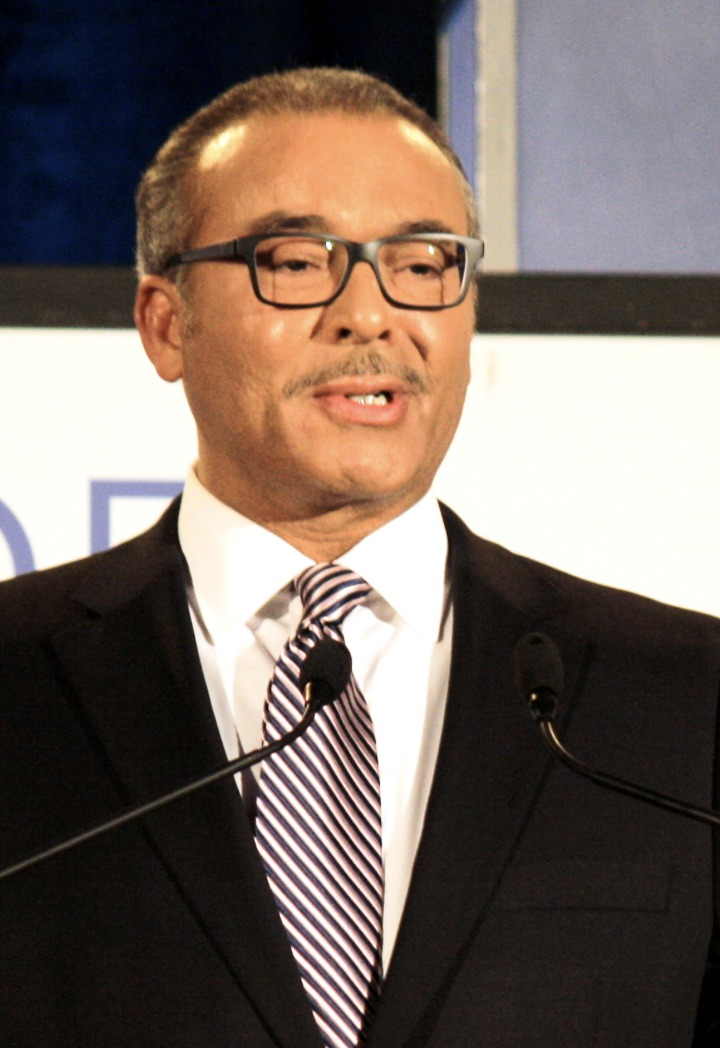

52nd Mayor of Columbus
- In office January 1, 2000 – January 1, 2016
- Preceded by: Greg Lashutka
- Succeeded by: Andrew Ginther

Personal details
- Born: November 18, 1954 (age 71) Indianapolis, Indiana, U.S.
- Party: Democratic
- Spouses: Frankie Coleman (m. 1984; dissolved 2011) Janelle Simmons (m. 2016)
- Education: University of Cincinnati (BA); University of Dayton (JD)

Michael B. Coleman (born November 18, 1954) is an American politician of the Democratic Party who served as the 52nd mayor of Columbus, Ohio. He was the first African-American to serve as the mayor of Ohio's capital city.

Coleman was a member of the Columbus City Council from 1992 to 1999, serving as its president from 1997 to 1999. In 1998, Coleman was the running mate for gubernatorial candidate Lee Fisher. Coleman ran for and won the Columbus mayorship in 1999 and was re-elected unopposed November 4, 2003.

In February 2005, Coleman announced that he would run for the Democratic nomination for Governor of Ohio in the 2006 gubernatorial election, but subsequently dropped out of the race on November 29, 2005, citing heavy work and family obligations. In 2007, Mayor Coleman won a third term as mayor of Columbus. In 2011, he was re-elected for a fourth term.

In January 2014, as he began his 15th year in office, Coleman became the longest-serving mayor in Columbus' history. On November 25, 2014, Coleman announced that he would not run for reelection. His final term in office ended on January 1, 2016, when he was succeeded by Columbus City Council President and fellow Democrat Andrew Ginther.

== Early life and education ==
Michael B. Coleman was born in Indianapolis, Indiana on November 18, 1954, and moved to Toledo at an early age. After growing up in the Toledo area, Coleman earned a Bachelor of Arts degree in political science from the University of Cincinnati and a Juris Doctor from the University of Dayton School of Law.

== Career ==
=== Attorney ===
From 1984 to 1999, Coleman was an attorney in the business practice of Columbus law firm Schottenstein, Zox & Dunn Co. LPA, eventually becoming a partner.

=== Columbus City Council ===
Michael B. Coleman began his career in public office when he was appointed to Columbus City Council in 1992. He was subsequently re-elected to two terms in office. Coleman served as Columbus City Council President from 1997 until his election as mayor in 1999.

=== 1998 and 2006 gubernatorial races ===
Coleman was selected as the 1998 Democratic nominee for lieutenant governor of Ohio, on the same ballot as Lee Fisher. Fisher and Coleman lost a heavily contested race to Bob Taft and Maureen O'Connor.

In 2005, Michael B. Coleman was the first Democrat to announce in the Democratic primary for governor of Ohio. But on November 29, 2005, he withdrew from the race, citing family concerns and also that the city of Columbus needed him in his current role as mayor.

Coleman later endorsed fellow Democrat Ted Strickland for governor. After Strickland's victory in November 2006, Coleman was selected as chair for Strickland's transition team.

=== Mayor of Columbus ===
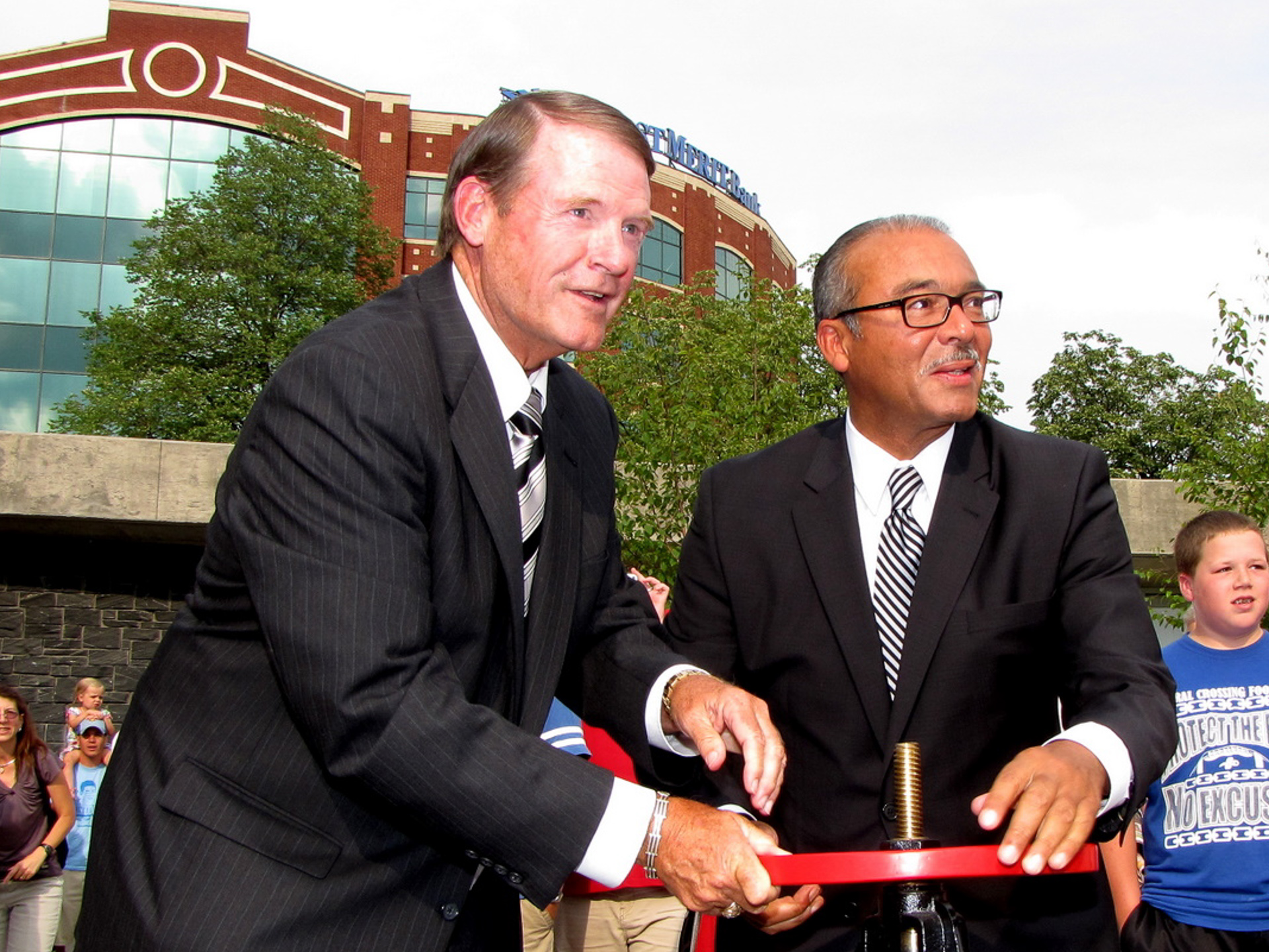
American Electric Power CEO Michael G. Morris (left) and Columbus Mayor Michael B. Coleman (right) open the valve to inaugurate the new AEP Fountain at the reopening of Bicentennial Park in Columbus on July 7, 2011.

After winning election in 1999, Coleman was re-elected as mayor of Columbus in 2003, 2007 and 2011.

Since 2000, under Mayor Coleman, the city of Columbus has spent $54 million less than budgeted. At the same time, he helped boost the city's spending on police and fire services from 63 percent of the city operating budget to 71 percent in 2005. Under Coleman, the city has also cut more than $190 million from continuation budgeting levels since 2000, despite increases in costs for medical insurance, wages and workers compensation. As of 2013, bonds issued by the city of Columbus received a AAA bond rating from all three major rating services, the highest possible rating.

As of June 2007, Coleman was a member of the Mayors Against Illegal Guns Coalition (now known as Everytown for Gun Safety), a bi-partisan group with a stated goal of "making the public safer by getting illegal guns off the streets." The coalition was then co-chaired by Boston Mayor Thomas Menino and New York City Mayor Michael Bloomberg.

Coleman was a long-list finalist for the 2008 World Mayor award.

==== 2007 mayoral campaign ====
During the 2007 mayoral campaign, Coleman was opposed by lawyer William Todd, a Republican. Todd claimed Coleman was soft on crime and ineffective on economic development. Coleman was re-elected, with the certified results showing he received more than 69 percent of 105,792 votes cast to Todd's 30 percent.

==== 2010 immigration debate ====
In the spring of 2010 Mayor Coleman banned city workers from traveling to Arizona in a boycott over an Arizona law allowing police officers to demand documentation of citizenship of anyone suspected of being in the United States illegally. Coleman compared the Arizona measure to 19th-century laws that required freed slaves to carry emancipation papers. He said his boycott was intended to show Arizona that its law enforcing illegal immigration measures is not the American way. While travel by city workers to Arizona is prohibited, police officers will be able to travel for the purpose of criminal extradition. Contracts with Arizona companies will be reviewed on a case-by-case basis by the Mayor. Redflex Traffic Systems, which is based in Arizona, operates 20 red-light cameras in Columbus. The red-light cameras issue tickets to red-light runners, the program will not be rescinded as a result of the ban, and in fact the number of red-light cameras will double as recently approved by city council.

==== Columbus Mayoral election, 2011 ====
Mayor Coleman ran in 2011 for a fourth term as mayor of Columbus against Republican challenger Earl W. Smith. On November 8, 2011, Coleman won re-election, receiving just under 70 percent of 179,032 votes cast.

==== Longest-serving mayor ====
On January 2, 2014, Coleman began his 15th year in office and became the city's longest-serving mayor. He surpassed the tenure of M.E. "Jack" Sensenbrenner, who served a total of 14 years as mayor in separate tenures from 1954 to 1960 and 1964 to 1972. Coleman was also the country's longest-serving black mayor.

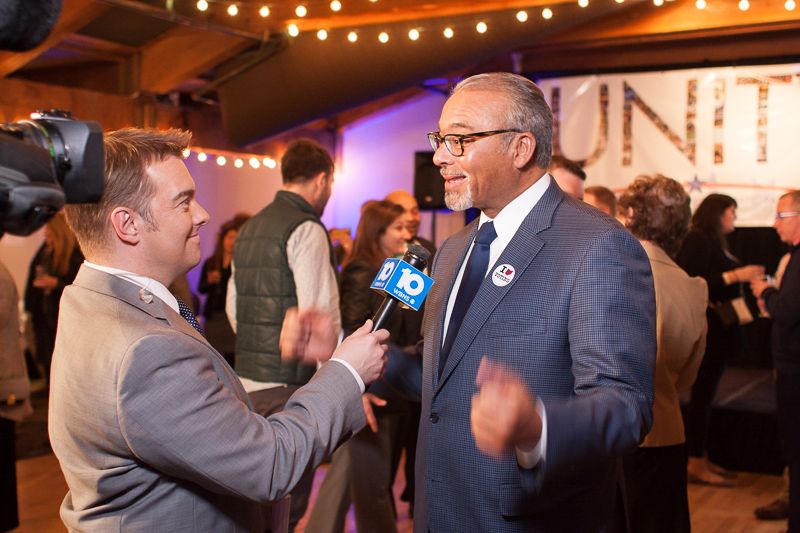
Coleman in March 2016

=== Return to private practice ===
On November 25, 2014, Coleman formally announced that he would not seek a fifth term as mayor of Columbus in the 2015 election. In November 2015, Coleman announced that he would return in 2016 to the practice of law with Indianapolis-based law firm Ice Miller LLP, which merged with his old Columbus law firm Schottenstein, Zox & Dunn Co. LPA in 2012. Coleman serves as director of business and government strategies and a partner in the firm's Arena District office.

In March 2018, the City of Columbus dedicated its new municipal office building to Coleman. The Michael B. Coleman Government Center houses the Building and Zoning, Public Service and Development departments and some Public Utility offices.

== Personal life ==
In 1984, Coleman married his wife Frankie; it was the second marriage for both. The Colemans have three adult children: Kimberly; Justin, who is an officer with the Columbus Division of Police; and John-David, who served as a sergeant in the United States Marine Corps. In October 2009, Mayor and Mrs. Coleman announced that they were in the process of divorcing. In early 2011 the Colemans filed for a dissolution, which was subsequently granted.

In September 2016, Coleman married longtime companion and president of the L Brands Foundation Janelle Simmons.

Coleman is a member of Kappa Alpha Psi as well as a Prince Hall Freemason. He belongs to St. Mark's Lodge #7 in Columbus, Ohio.

== See also ==
- List of Ohio lieutenant gubernatorial elections

Party political offices
Preceded by Peter Lawson Jones	Democratic nominee for Lieutenant Governor of Ohio; 1998	Succeeded by Charleta Tavares
Political offices
Preceded by Greg Lashutka	Mayor of Columbus, Ohio; 2000–2016	Succeeded by Andrew Ginther
