= Cristo Rey Columbus High School =

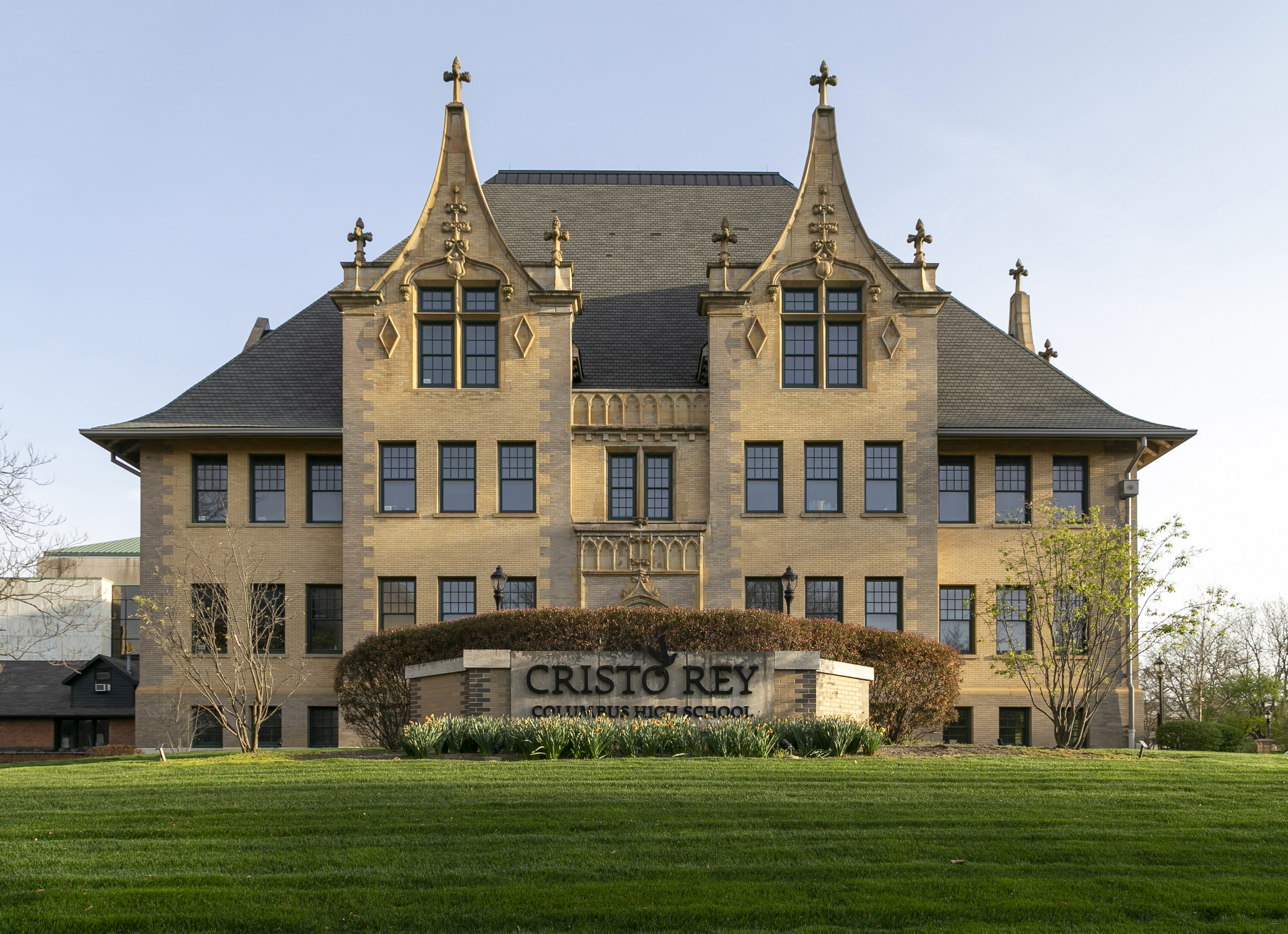

Location
- 400 East Town Street; Columbus, Ohio 43215; United States

Information
- Other names: CRCHS; CRC
- Type: Private high school
- Religious affiliation: Roman Catholic
- Established: 2013
- Oversight: Roman Catholic Diocese of Columbus
- NCES School ID: A1502835
- President: Jim Foley
- Teaching staff: 27.8 (on an FTE basis)
- Grades: 9–12
- Gender: Co-educational
- Enrollment: 382 (2017-2018)
- Student to teacher ratio: 13.7
- Affiliation: Cristo Rey Network
- Website: www.cristoreycolumbus.org
- Ohio Institution for the Education of the Deaf and Dumb
- U.S. National Register of Historic Places
- Columbus Register of Historic Properties
- Interactive map highlighting the building's location
- Coordinates: 39°57′28″N 83°1′22″W
- Architect: Richards, McCarty & Bulford
- NRHP reference No.: 84000107
- CRHP No.: CR-32

Significant dates
- Added to NRHP: October 25, 1984
- Designated CRHP: November 19, 1984

Cristo Rey Columbus High School (CRCHS or CRC) is a private, Roman Catholic, co-educational high school in Columbus, Ohio, United States. It was established in 2013 and is located in the Roman Catholic Diocese of Columbus. It follows the Cristo Rey work-study model of education for students from low-income families.

== History ==
The school building was built in 1899 as part of the Ohio Institution for the Deaf and Dumb (today the Ohio School for the Deaf). It was listed on the National Register of Historic Places on October 25, 1984, and the Columbus Register of Historic Properties on November 19, 1984.

Cristo Rey Columbus was established in 2013 as a part of the Cristo Rey Network of high schools. The building underwent an $18 million restoration to accommodate the new school. Renovations included motion-sensor lights in all classrooms, wi-fi, and built-in projectors that connect to students' tablets and display their work on whiteboards, all of which become smart boards.

The school serves students from families of limited means. Students work five days a month at entry-level jobs at four dozen businesses in the metro area.

== See also ==
- National Register of Historic Places listings in Columbus, Ohio
