= Peter Pan =

Peter Pan commonly refers to:

- Peter Pan (character), a fictional boy who refuses to grow up, created by Scottish author J. M. Barrie
- Peter Pan (play and novel) (1904), the play that first popularised the character

Peter Pan may also refer to:

== Works featuring the character Peter Pan ==
=== Books ===
- Peter Pan in Kensington Gardens (1906), originally a chapter in The Little White Bird about the character's origin and infancy
- Peter and Wendy (1911), the novel based on the play
- Peter Pan (1928), the first published edition of the play:
  - Peter Pan in Scarlet (2006), an authorised sequel

=== Plays and musicals ===
- Peter Pan (1950 musical), the Leonard Bernstein Broadway stage adaptation of the play, never filmed
- Peter Pan (1954 musical), the Broadway musical adaptation of the play featuring Mary Martin. Telecast live on TV twice, and afterwards videotaped for future telecasts
- Peter Pan (Three Sixty Entertainment), an updated version of the original play presented in its own theatre pavilion using 360 degree video

=== Film and television ===
- Peter Pan (1924 film), the silent film based on the play
- Peter Pan (1953 film), the animated film by The Walt Disney Company based on the play
- Peter Pan (1976 musical), a TV film by Dwight Hemion
- Peter Pan (2003 film), the first live-action sound film based on the play, directed by P. J. Hogan
- Peter Pan no Boken, the anime adaptation and extension of the Peter Pan story
- Peter Pan and the Pirates, the 1990s animated TV show
- Peter Pan Live!, a live television special and production of the 1954 musical adaptation of Peter and Wendy, broadcast on NBC in 2014
- Pan (2015 film), a prequel film by Joe Wright
- Peter and Wendy (film), a 2015 TV film by Diarmuid Lawrence
- Peter Pan & Wendy (film), a 2023 live-action film

=== Sculpture ===
- Peter Pan statue, 1912 bronze in Kensington Gardens, London, England, with copies elsewhere
- Peter Pan (Columbus, Ohio), 1927 fountain and sculpture in Columbus, Ohio, US
- Paul Montfort's 1925 statue in Melbourne, Australia
- Charles Andrew Hafner's 1928 sculpture in Carl Schurz Park in New York City
- Alex Proudfoot RSA's 1949 statue at the Mearnskirk Hospital for children in Glasgow
- Ivan Mitford-Barberton's 1959 sculpture at the Red Cross Children's Hospital in Cape Town, South Africa
- Cecil Thomas's 1965 sculpture in Dunedin Botanic Garden, New Zealand
- Alistair Smart's 1972 statue in Kirriemuir in Scotland
- Catherine Marr-Johnson's 1988 drinking fountain statue in the park of Blenheim Palace

=== Other works ===
- Peter Pan's Flight, a dark ride attraction at Walt Disney Parks and Resorts
- Peter Pan (video game), 1984 game

== Animals ==
- Peter Pan (American horse) (1904–1933), a US thoroughbred racehorse
- Peter Pan (Australian horse) (1929–1941), an Australia thoroughbred racehorse

== Music ==
- Peter Pan Records, a record label of the 1950s–70s, specialising in children's records
- Petar Pan, Serbian rock band
- Peterpan (band), former name of Indonesian alternative pop band, now known as Noah
- Peter Pan (album) by Dutch rockband Peter Pan Speedrock
- "Peter Pan" (Kelsea Ballerini song), 2016
- "Peter Pan" (Brent Faiyaz song), 2025
- "Peter Pan", first published song by Noël Coward, later recorded by Bessie Jones in 1918
- "In Search of Peter Pan", a song by Kate Bush from the album Lionheart
- "Peter Pan", a song by Exo from XOXO
- "Peter Pan", a song by (G)I-dle from I Feel

== People ==
- Peter Pan (singer) (born 1984), Taiwanese pop singer
- Randy Constan, Peter Pan impersonator
- Peterpan, born José Fernandes de Paula, composer

== Transportation ==
- "Peter Pan", a Kerr Stuart Wren narrow gauge locomotive belonging to the Leighton Buzzard Light Railway, Bedfordshire, England
- Peter Pan Bus Lines, based in the northeastern US
- Several passenger ships operated by TT-Line, including:
  - Peter Pan (1986–1993), now MS Princess Seaways
  - MS Peter Pan (2023) (IMO 9880946), a LNG-powered "Green Ship"

== Other ==
- Peter Pan (peanut butter)
- Peter Pan collar, style of clothing collar, flat in design with rounded corners
- Peter Pan Cup, swimming trophy for a Christmas-day race, first awarded by Barrie in 1904
- Operation Peter Pan, in which children of Cuba were flown to the US
- DDT Peter Pan, an annual professional wrestling event

== See also ==
- Peter Pan syndrome (disambiguation)
