= Mary Elizabeth Cook =

American artist

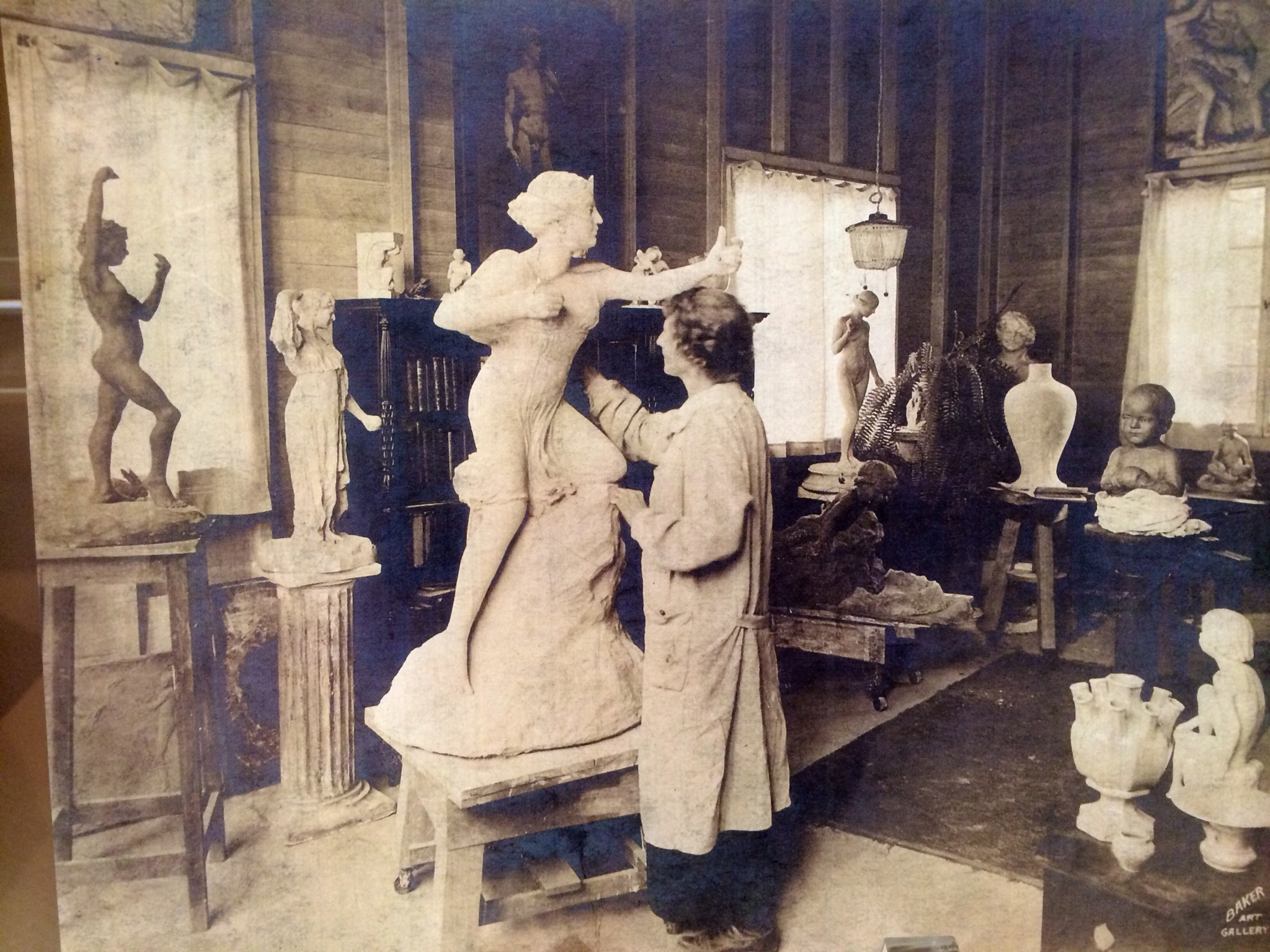
- Mary Elizabeth Cook in her studio, 1916
- Born: 31 December 1863; Chillicothe, Ohio
- Died: 4 April 1951 (aged 87); Columbus, Ohio
- Education: Ohio State University
- Known for: Ceramic art, sculpture, reconstructive surgery

Mary Elizabeth Cook, also known as Mae or May Elizabeth Cook, was an American artist primarily known for her sculptural and ceramic works.

== Early life ==
Cook was born in Chillicothe, Ohio, to Anna Sappington Cook and William Alexander Cook. Her father was a financier and bank president, and Cook was encouraged to follow her passion for art and music.

She would often make sketches and sculptures of things and people she found interesting, and spent a lot of time practicing painting and coloring. In addition to her art she became skilled at playing the piano and by the age of 10 she performed duets with her family physician, who played the violin.

Cook's father died when she was 6 years old, and her family moved to Columbus, Ohio.

== Career ==
=== Artwork ===
In the early 1900s, Cook taught sculpture at the Columbus Art School. Around the same time, she worked as a lithographer and designer for Roseville Pottery, though no records survive showing which pottery lines she was involved or how long she worked with the company.

In 1910, at age 46, she enrolled at Ohio State University and was the first woman to study in Edward Orton Jr.'s pioneering ceramic engineering course, however she was not awarded a degree due to her gender. Shortly afterwards, she traveled to Paris, France, and studied sculpture under Paul Wayland Bartlett.

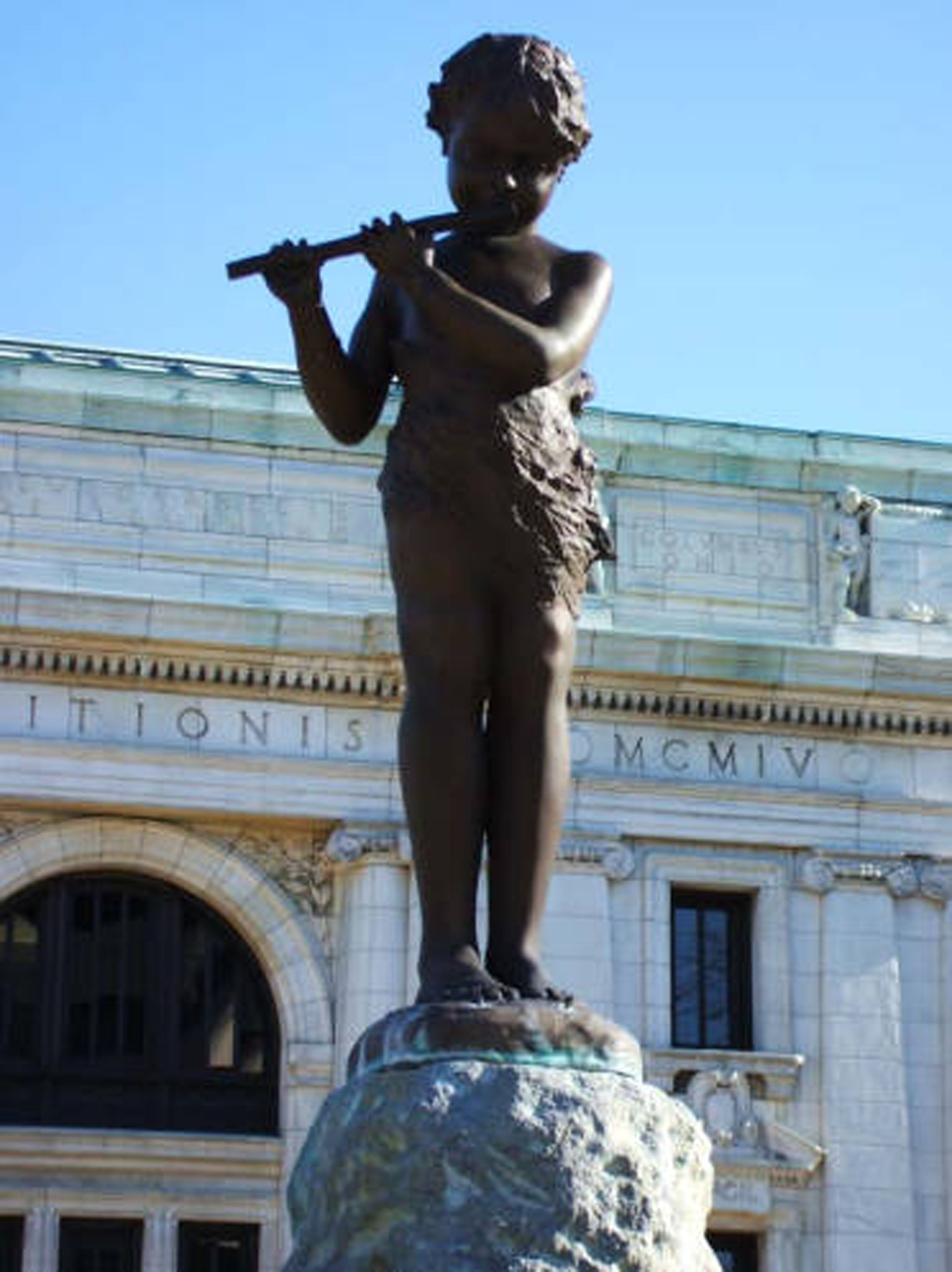
Cook's 1927 Peter Pan statue outside the Main Branch of the Columbus Metropolitan Library

Cook returned to the United States in 1914 and proceeded to exhibit her work in various exhibitions around the country. In a 1915 exhibition overview, she was described as the first and only female member of the American Ceramic Society. She operated her own studio in Columbus, personally handling the clay selection, sculpting, drying, and firing of her large-scale ceramic sculptures. Cook described the range of her studio in a 1916 article:

I am afraid I could hardly be classed as a potter, though I am making lamps, urns (some of them four feet in height with figures in relief), sun dials, fountains, and portraits in terra cotta.

=== World War I ===
Cook joined the Women's Army Corps in October, 1918. She traveled to Paris shortly after, where she served as a relief worker in a Red Cross hospital at 4 Rue de Chevreuse.

She was invited by U.S. Army Surgeon General William C. Gorgas to serve in a facial reconstruction unit at Fort McHenry Hospital in Baltimore, Maryland, traveling there in early 1919. For 15 months, Cook helped sculpt the likeness of soldiers who were undergoing maxillofacial surgery.

Between 1918 and 1921, Cook produced over 1300 models, molds, and casts for wounded soldiers during the war, including life masks, plaster casts, and sketches. She used photographs, descriptions, and anatomical standards to recreate facial features prior to injury in sculpted or modeled form. These provided surgeons with a visual reference for plastic surgery.

Cook spoke highly of the soldiers in a 1919 interview:

No one can appreciate the patience of those fellows, their fortitude and courage nor the suffering they have endured. Just imagine 23 operations to rebuild a lower jaw and chin with a dozen more in prospect before the man can be discharged. But despite the mini operations and long months of confinement in hospital wards, their spirit is wonderful.

In addition to her work assisting with surgery, Cook gave vocational training in sculpture, pottery, and clay firing to soldiers. She strongly advocated for the use of ceramics as a vocational art for recuperating patients.

== Later life ==
After the war, Cook returned to her studio practice in Columbus. She remained active through the next decades, producing work in the form of statues, fountains, terra cotta panels, and bas reliefs.

In 1927 she produced her most widely-known work, a statue of Peter Pan commissioned by businessman Charles E. Munson in memory of his six-year-old son. The statue was set on a marble base in front of the Main Branch of the Columbus Metropolitan Library.

Cook suffered a hip injury in 1943 and was forced to relearn how to walk. At the time she said that she hoped to leave the hospital and travel to resume her earlier wartime work, but her injuries proved more serious than originally thought and she spent much of the rest of her life hospitalized at Saint Anthony's Hospital in Columbus. Cook died on April 4, 1951 at the age of 87.
