= Peter Pan syndrome (disambiguation) =

Peter Pan syndrome is an inability to grow up or engage in behaviour usually associated with adulthood.

Peter Pan Syndrome may also refer to:

- Puer aeternus, a pop-psychology concept of a male or female adult who is socially immature
- Peter Pan Syndrome (album), a 2013 album by J-Zone
- Peter Pan Syndrome (manga), a Japanese manga by Mayu Sakai
- "The Peter Pan Syndrome", a 1974 episode of British television series Bachelor Father

== See also ==
- Peter Pan (disambiguation)
