= Columbus Metropolitan Library =

Library system in the Columbus metropolitan area

Coordinates: 39.961238°N 82.989516°W

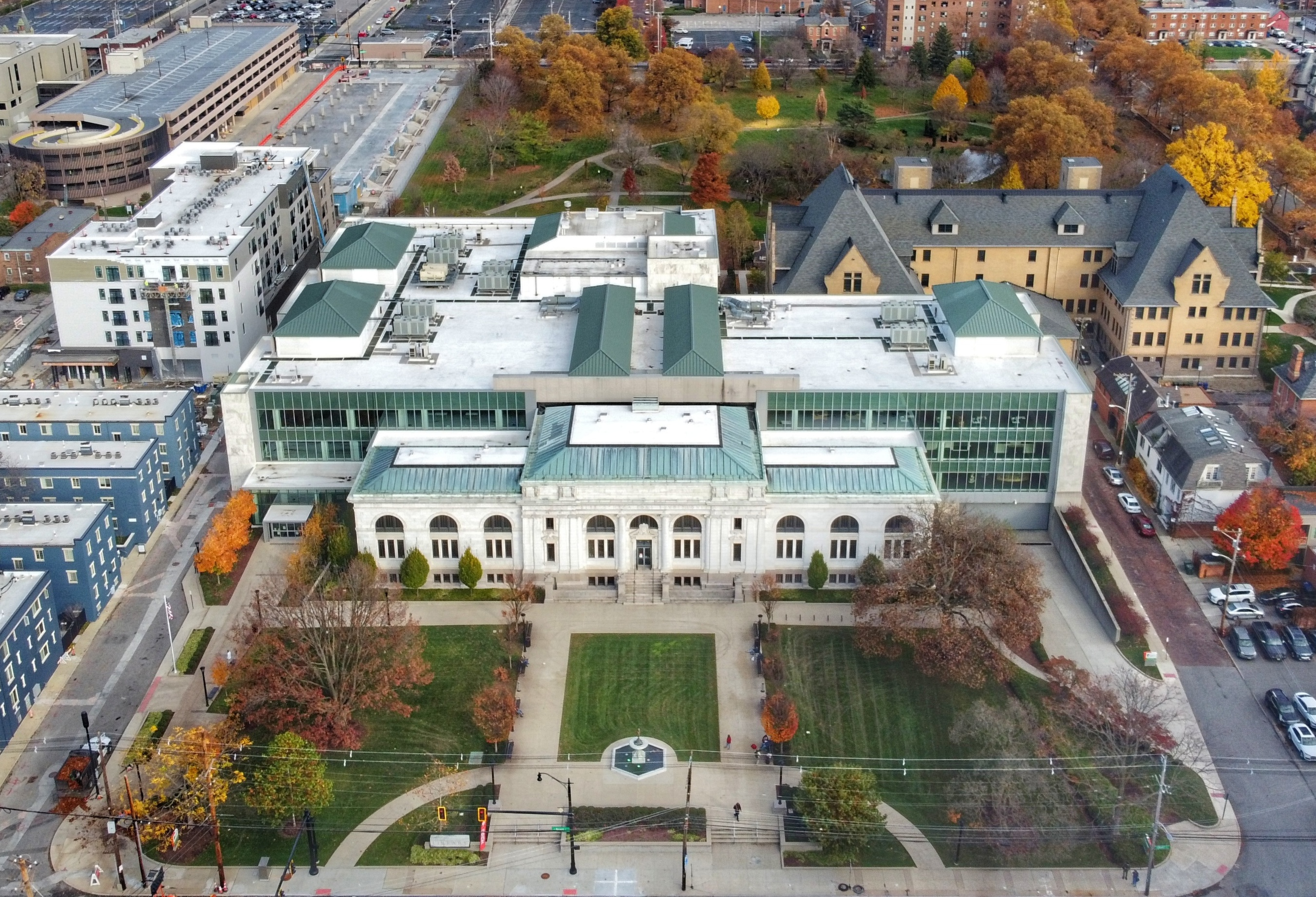
- Main branch of the library system
- Location: Columbus, Ohio
- Type: Public library
- Established: 1873; 153 years ago
- Branches: Main Library and 22 branches

Collection
- Size: 1,483,433

Access and use
- Circulation: 13.1 million
- Population served: estimated 1 million

Other information
- Budget: $87,249,000
- Director: Lauren Hagan
- Employees: 846 (pre-pandemic numbers)
- Website: www.columbuslibrary.org

The Columbus Metropolitan Library (CML) is a public library system in Franklin County, Ohio, in the Columbus metropolitan area. The library serves an area of approximately 1 million residents, has a collection of 1,483,433 volumes, and circulates 17,262,267 items per year.

The library consists of the Main Library and 22 branches located in neighborhoods throughout Franklin County. The branches are Barnett, Canal Winchester, Driving Park, Dublin, Franklinton, Gahanna, Hilliard, Hilltop, Karl Road, Linden, Marion-Franklin, Martin Luther King, New Albany, Northern Lights, Northside, Parsons, Reynoldsburg, Shepard, South High, Southeast, Whetstone, and Whitehall. CML also jointly operates the Northwest Library in cooperation with Worthington Libraries. Columbus Metropolitan Library is a member of the Central Library Consortium, which enables its 18-member library systems to share a catalog.

== History ==
=== Early history ===
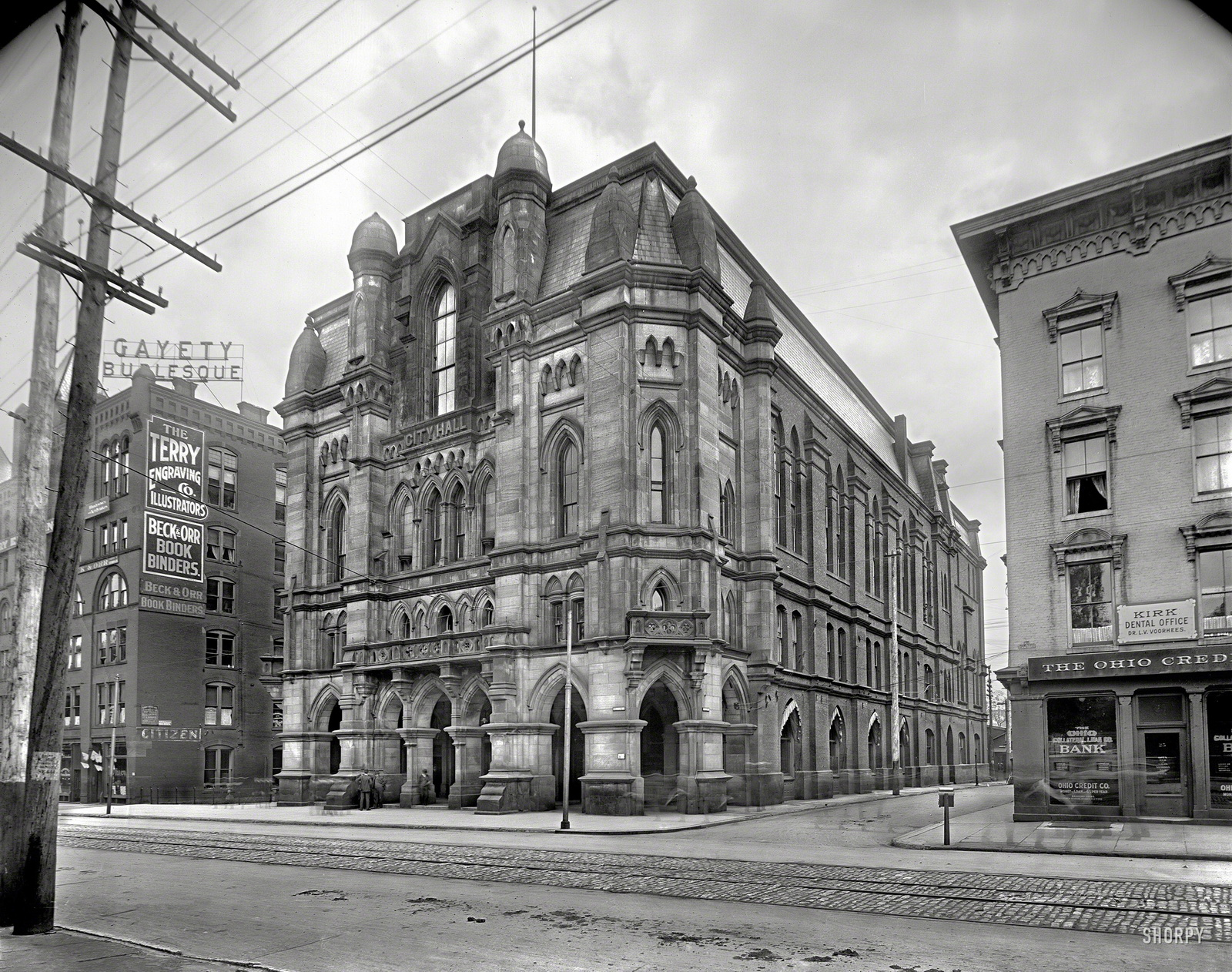
Columbus City Hall (1872–1921), location of the city's first public library

Following the founding of Columbus in 1812, the people of the city struggled to establish a public library. While several attempts were made with private funds, such as the 1835 Columbus Reading Room and Institute and the 1853 Columbus Athenium, these were all short-lived. On January 1, 1872, John J. Janney introduced an ordinance to the Columbus City Council which would allocate public funds for the construction of a library. The Columbus Public Library and Reading Room was opened on March 4, 1873, in the reading room on the first floor of City Hall, with a collection of 1,500 books. These included 1,200 from the Columbus Athenaeum (1853-1872), 358 from Columbus's high school library, and 33 from its horticultural society. In 1906, the reading room moved to a separate building across from the Ohio Statehouse. James L. Grover served as the first director of the library, for a period of six years beginning in 1872.

=== Construction of the Main Library ===
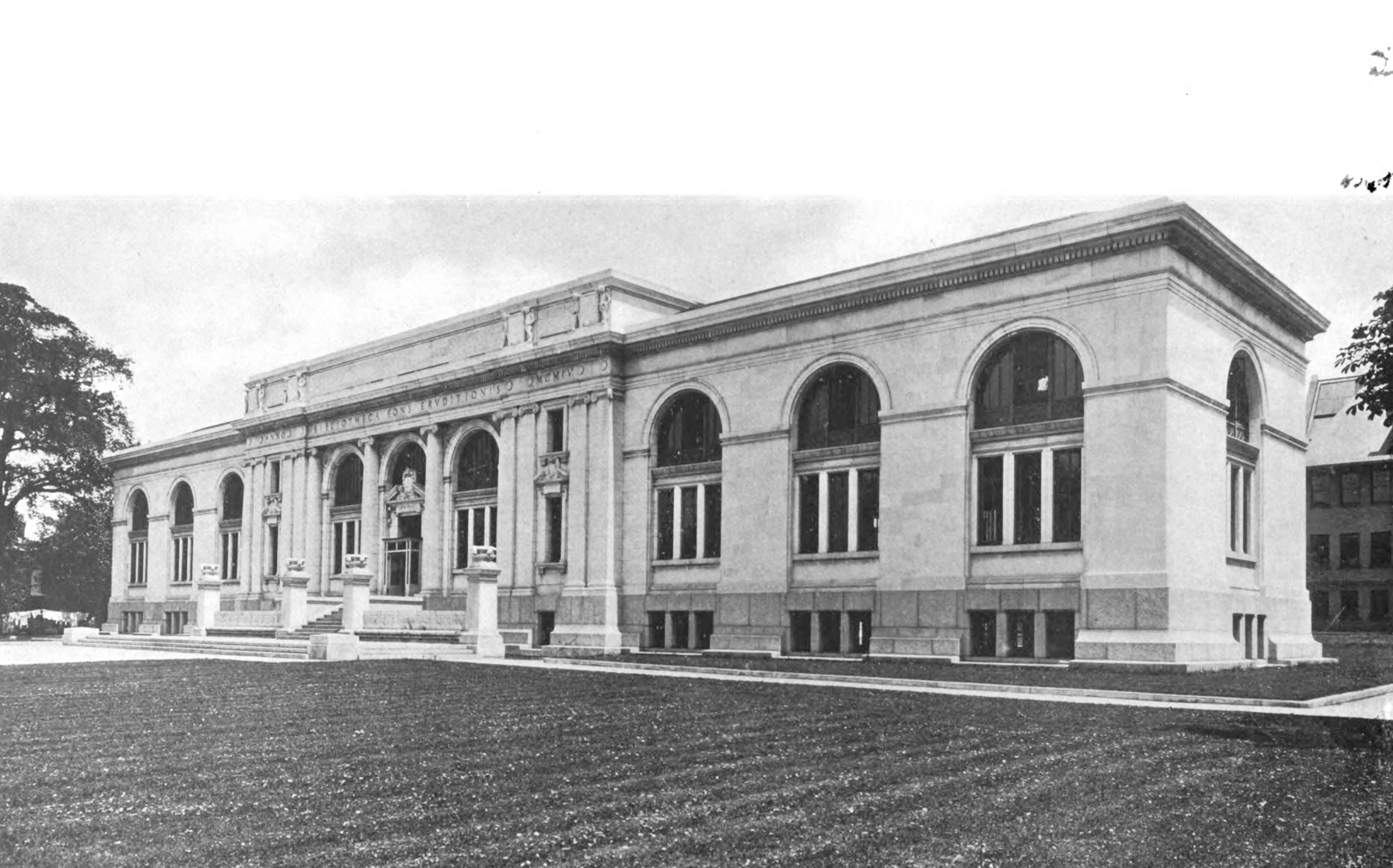
The Carnegie Public Library as originally built, c. 1907

The system's Main Library was built to replace the reading rooms. It was constructed from 1903 to 1906 primarily using funds donated by Andrew Carnegie. Columbus was initially passed over by Carnegie for funds to build a large main library, as it was against his preference for smaller branches accessible to local working class residents. Library director John Pugh traveled to New York City and secured Carnegie's $150,000 donation after bonding over their similar heritage; Carnegie was Scottish and Pugh was Welsh. Carnegie's secretary composed a letter stating that, “not more than one hundred and fifty thousand dollars would be spent upon the main building,” on the condition that the city fund the library for, “at least twenty thousand dollars a year.” The City Council approved the offer and used the initial funds to purchase the $40,000 estate of Thomas Ewing Miller at 96 S. Grant Avenue. With cost of construction exceeding initial estimates, Carnegie agreed to fund an additional $50,000, bringing his full donation to $200,000. A construction contract was awarded to James Westwater & Company, and the building was ready for occupancy in the fall of 1906. The building had a cost of $310,000; the city covered the remaining amount and agreed to pay at least $20,000 per year in maintenance and growth; a stipulation of Carnegie's gift. Carnegie's library was dedicated on April 4, 1907.

=== Expansion ===
On January 23, 1928, the City Council approved $30,000 to fund the first four branch libraries. The Clintonville, Linden, Parsons, and Hilltop branches opened on October 4 of the same year. Additional branches included Linden, Northside, Franklinton, Hilltop, Whitehall, Eastside, Beechwold, Parsons, Northern Lights, Hilliard, Livingston, Reynoldsburg, Bolivar Arms, Morse Road, Gahanna, Clintonville, Martin Luther King, Dublin, South High, Driving Park, House of Knowledge, Channingway, Hilltonia, and Shepard, opened between 1935 and 1980. All branches were converted for accessibility beginning in June 1980. On June 28, 1989, library trustees voted to change the name of the library from Public Library of Columbus and Franklin County to Columbus Metropolitan Library. Since it initially opened, the Main Library has undergone four major renovations and expansions to accommodate the city's increasing population, in the 1950s, 1961, 1990–1991, and 2015–2016.

== Staffing ==
Staffing at CML consisted of 846 employees in April 2020, of whom 42 were fully accredited librarians, plus volunteers. The annual expenditures for the library collection totals $7.97 million. In 2017, CML had 5.8 million visits and loaned out 15.7 million items.

== Past Directors ==
Larry Black was appointed Director on November 21, 1984 and his new position was announced by then Board President, Newell Gilmour. Black, a native of Alabama, received his bachelor's degree and a masters degree in library science from the University of Alabama. He was awarded a masters in public administration from Ohio State University in 1981. Black had served as the assistant director of the J.L. Bedsole library at Mobile (Alabama) College, director of the Baldwin County Library System in Summerdale, Alabama and director of library services at Troy State University at Bay Minette, AL.

== Services ==
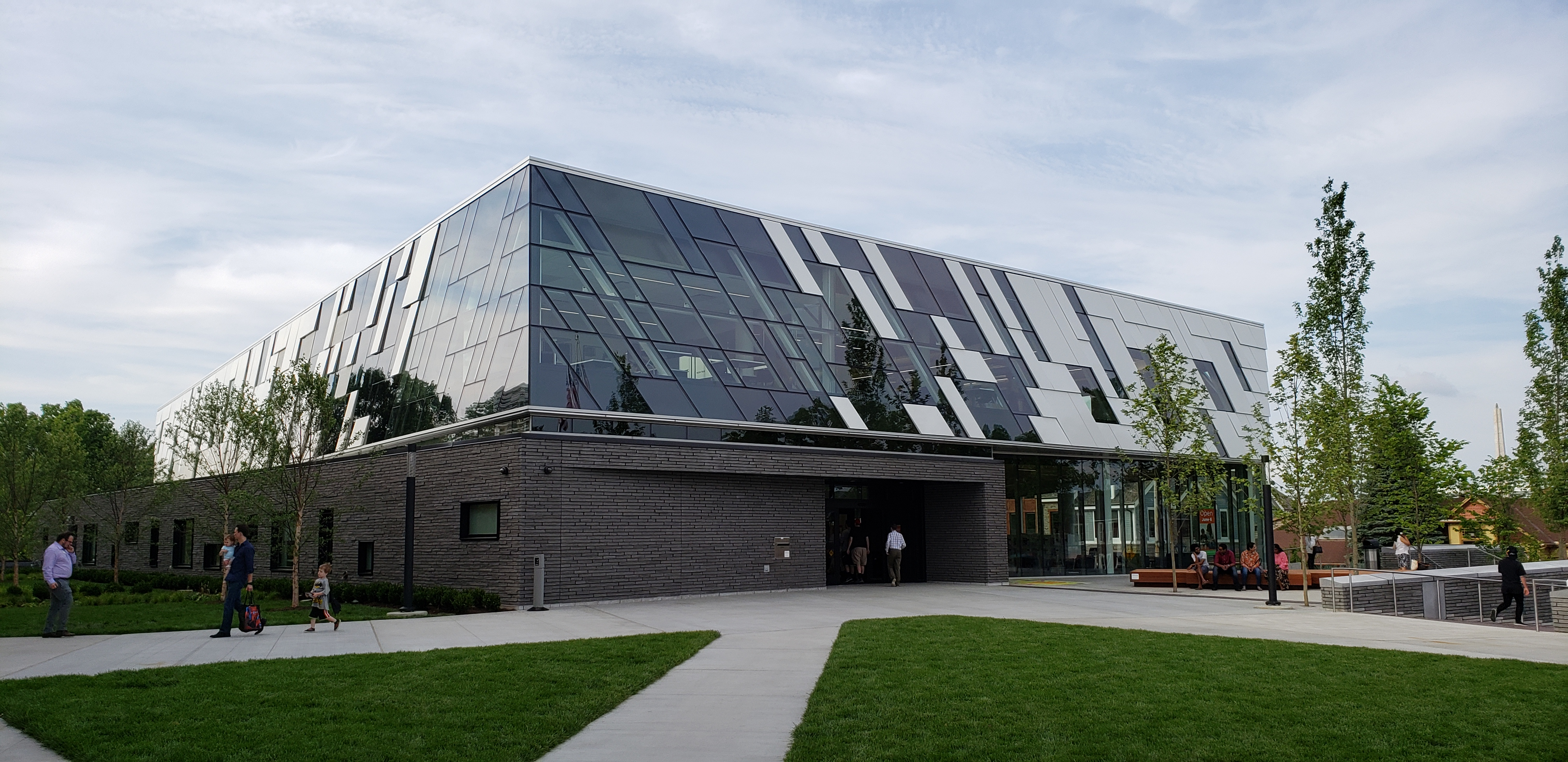
The Dublin branch

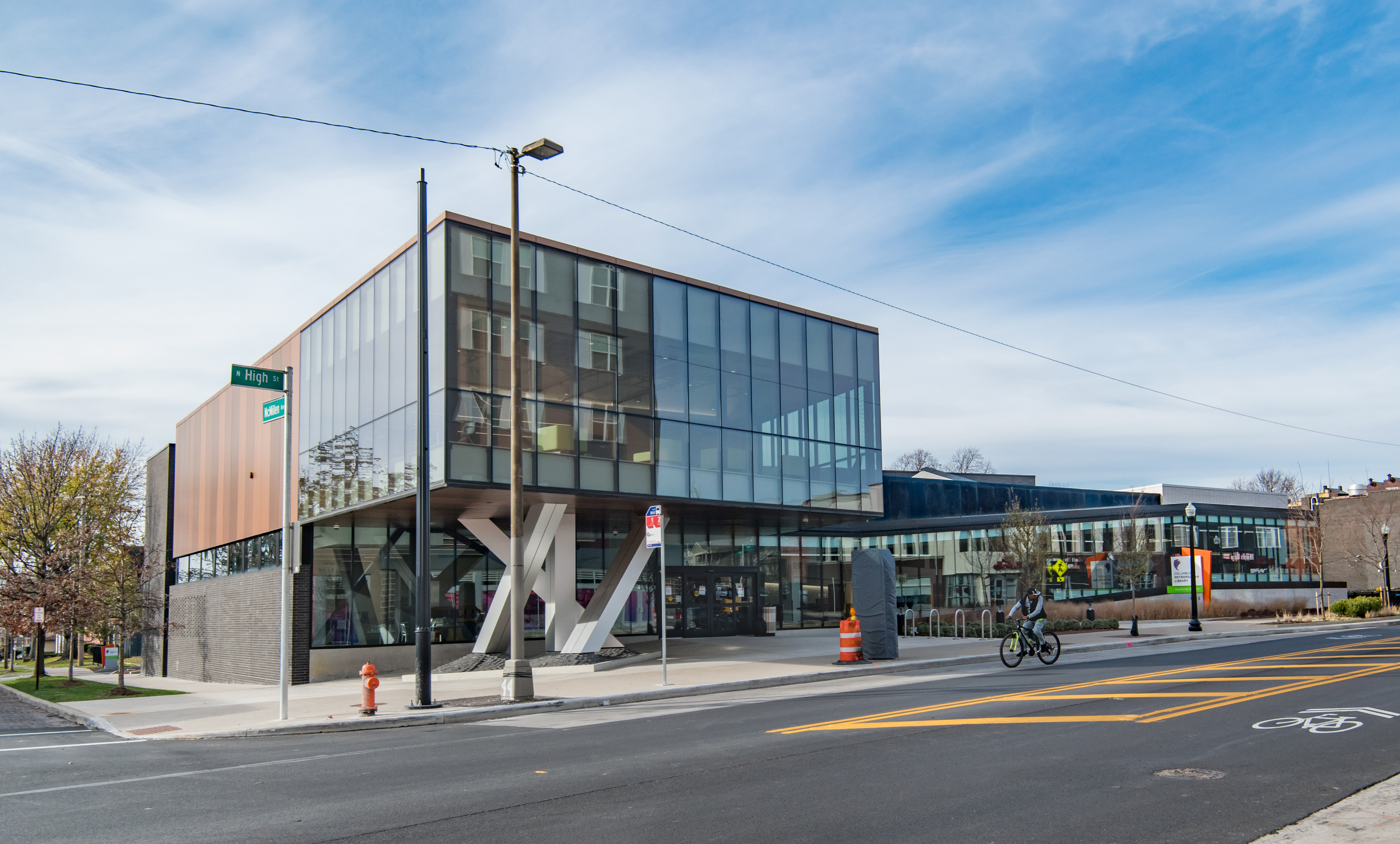
The Northside branch

The Columbus Metropolitan Library (CML) system aims to inspire reading, share resources and connect people through their numerous programs and activities. Those services target various groups among its diverse patronage. CML provides help for adults with General Educational Development (GED) classes, technology training for basic computer knowledge, adult basic learning classes, an introductory class on the use of Microsoft Word, Job Help Centers, and classes on basic internet skills. To attract young children and adolescent patrons to the library, CML provides Homework Help Centers at all 24 CML locations. There is also help for children who are home schooled. They also have several teen gaming nights and book groups - such the Summer Reading Challenge, "Comic Book Café," and the Manga & Anime club. Due to the growing population of Hispanics and Somalis, the library has an extensive English as a Second Language (ESL) program at several branch libraries. There is also Spanish reading time and technology classes taught in Spanish.

The Ready for Kindergarten program is for preschoolers and their parents or caregivers. The library coordinates with teachers and schools to provide Ready for Kindergarten Storytimes and Classes. Story time is also provided to children with special needs. The Lobby Stop program is for senior citizens in retirement apartments. It utilizes a specially designed truck to transport book carts with large print books, DVDs and other materials and set up a temporary library in the common areas. The Book by Mail program, which started in 1977, is for the homebound. Large print books and other materials are mailed monthly or bi-monthly through the US postal system.

The Library offers a unique Dial-A-Story services that provides 24/7 access to recorded content. Patrons can call 614-924-1800 from any phone and use the menu to navigate to various recordings.

== Innovation ==
CML first offered its patrons a public computer in 1977 and internet access in 1997. CML now has computers at all library locations and is WiFi enabled. In 2004 CML started the program "Know-It-Now", a 24/7 virtual reference service. The library also practices what it calls the "proactive reference" approach- having the librarians interact with patrons throughout the library instead of at a reference desk.

== Awards ==
Hennen's American Public Library Ratings listed CML as the top library system serving populations of 500,000 or greater in 1999, 2005, and 2008. These rankings were first published in the American Libraries magazine in 1999. Since that time, CML has been listed within the top four libraries for its population size every year (note: no rankings were published in 2003 or 2007; Hennen ceased to produce this content after 2010). CML was also named Library of the Year by the Library Journal in 2010.

== See also ==
- King-Lincoln Bronzeville § Martin Luther King Jr. Library
