= Main Library (Columbus, Ohio) =

Library in Ohio, US

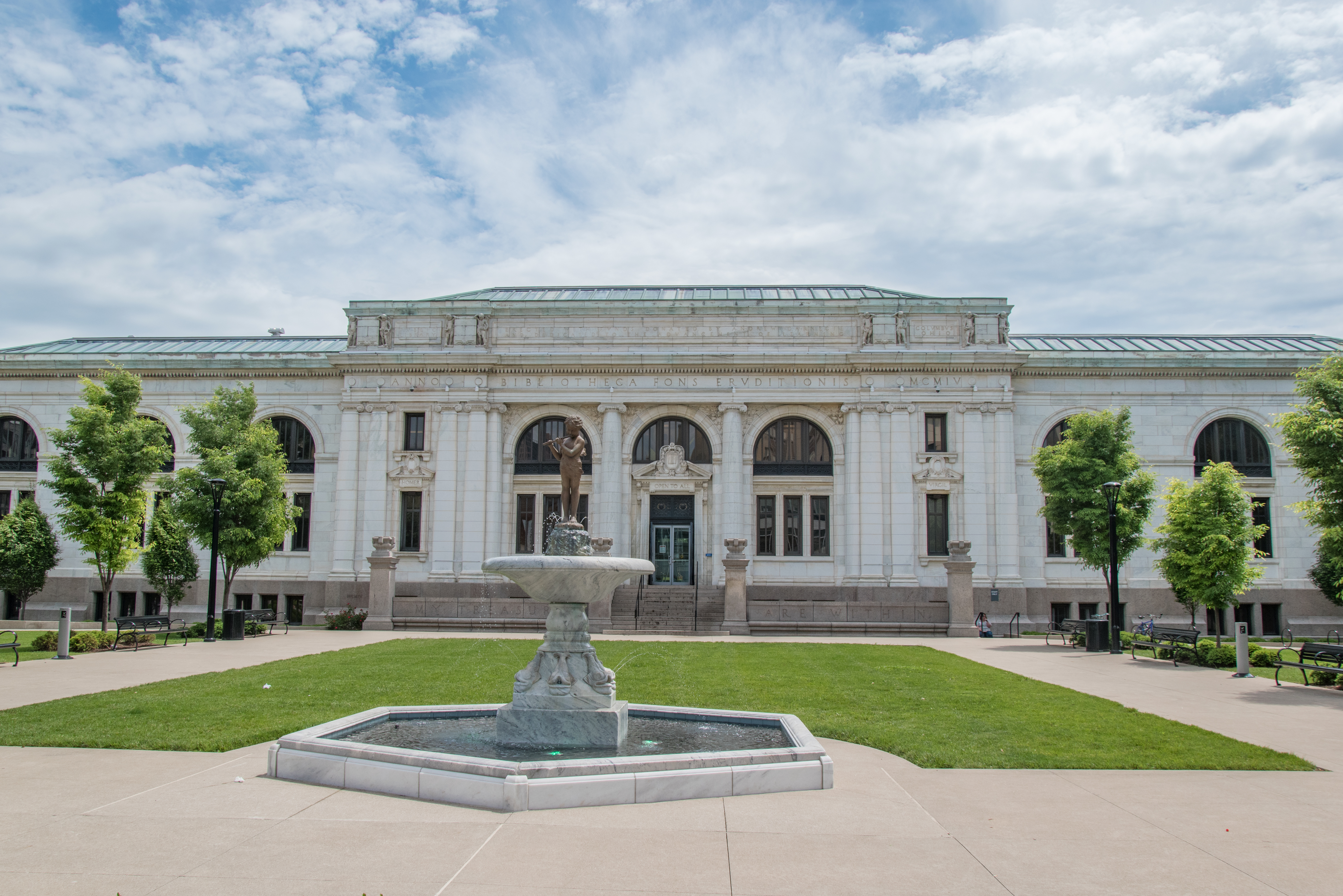
- West facade plaza and Peter Pan fountain
- 39.961238°N 82.989516°W
- Location: 96 S. Grant Avenue; Columbus, Ohio, United States
- Type: Public library
- Branch of: Columbus Metropolitan Library

Collection
- Size: 300,000 items

Other information
- Public transit access: 10, 11; CoGo
- Website: Official website

Architecture

History
- Built: 1903–1906, dedicated April 4, 1907

Site notes
- Architect: Albert Randolph Ross
- Architectural style: Beaux-Arts

The Main Library of the Columbus Metropolitan Library (CML) system is located in Downtown Columbus, Ohio, United States. The public library is the largest in the library system and holds approximately 300,000 volumes. It includes numerous rooms, including separate spaces for children, teens, an adult reading room, newspaper room, auditorium, gallery, gift shop, and a cafe. The third floor includes a computer lab and houses the Franklin County Genealogical & Historical Society.

The library building was proposed as early as 1901 when the public used a reading room in Columbus's city hall. In 1903, Andrew Carnegie largely funded its construction, making it a Carnegie library. The library was designed by Albert Randolph Ross in the Beaux-Arts style, using white Vermont marble. The building opened in 1907. It was first expanded in 1953 and 1961, followed by a 1991 addition and the demolition of the two prior structures; the process tripled the building's size. In 2015 and 2016, another renovation took place to increase reader space, add to its west lawn, join the building to Topiary Park at its east, and clad most of the 1991 building in glass.

== History ==
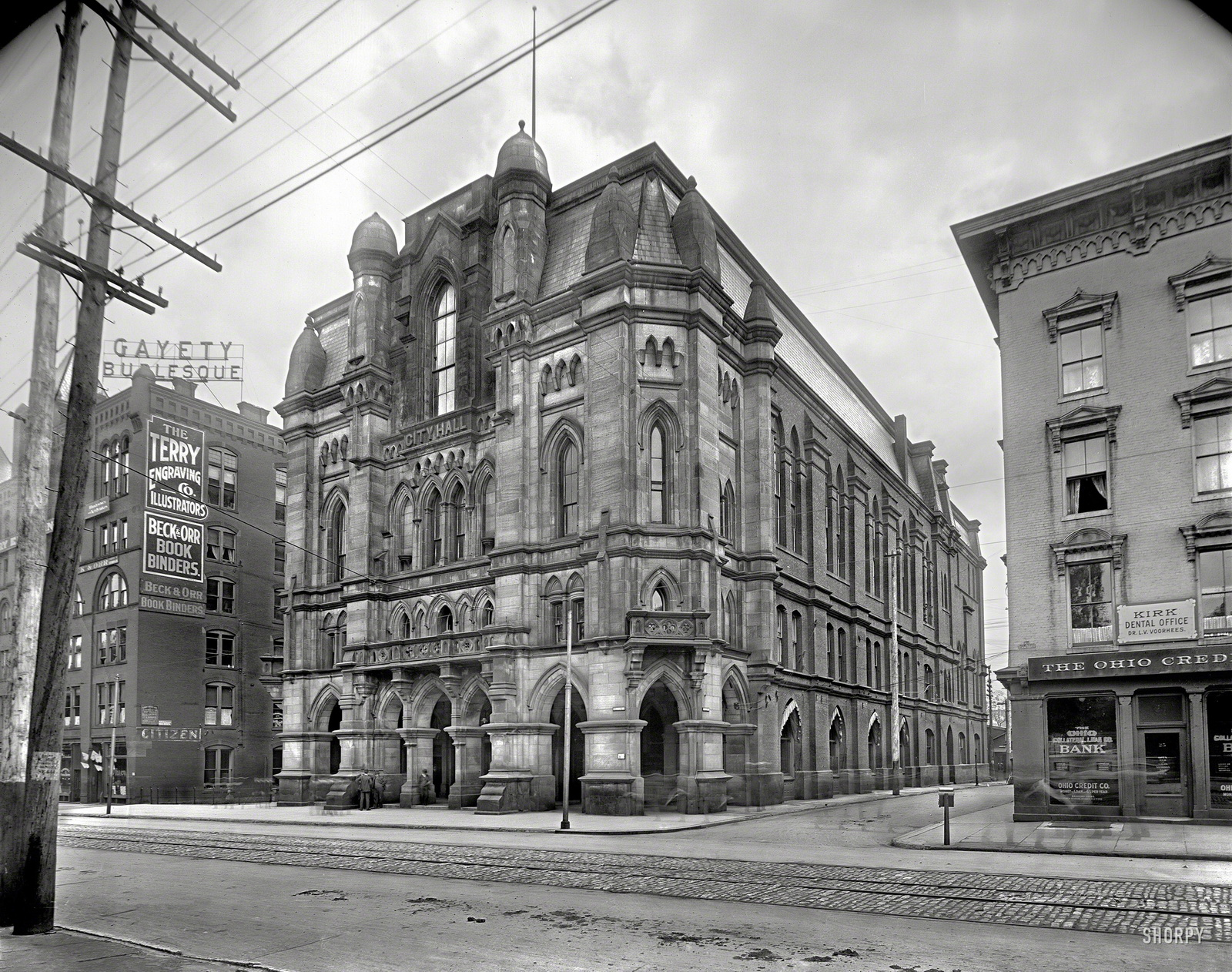
Columbus City Hall (1872–1921), location of the city's first public library

=== Predecessors and planning ===
The first public library in Columbus, the downtown reading room on the first floor of City Hall, opened on March 4, 1873, and contained 1,500 books. These included 1,200 from the Columbus Athenaeum (1853-1872), 358 from Columbus's high school library, and 33 from its horticultural society. In 1906, the reading room moved to a separate building across from the Ohio Statehouse.

Columbus was initially passed over by Carnegie for funds to build a large main library, as it was against his preference for smaller branches accessible to local working class residents. Library director John Pugh traveled to New York City and secured Carnegie's $150,000 donation after bonding over their British heritage; Carnegie was Scottish and Pugh was Welsh. The donation was later increased to $200,000 in 1903.

=== Construction and opening ===
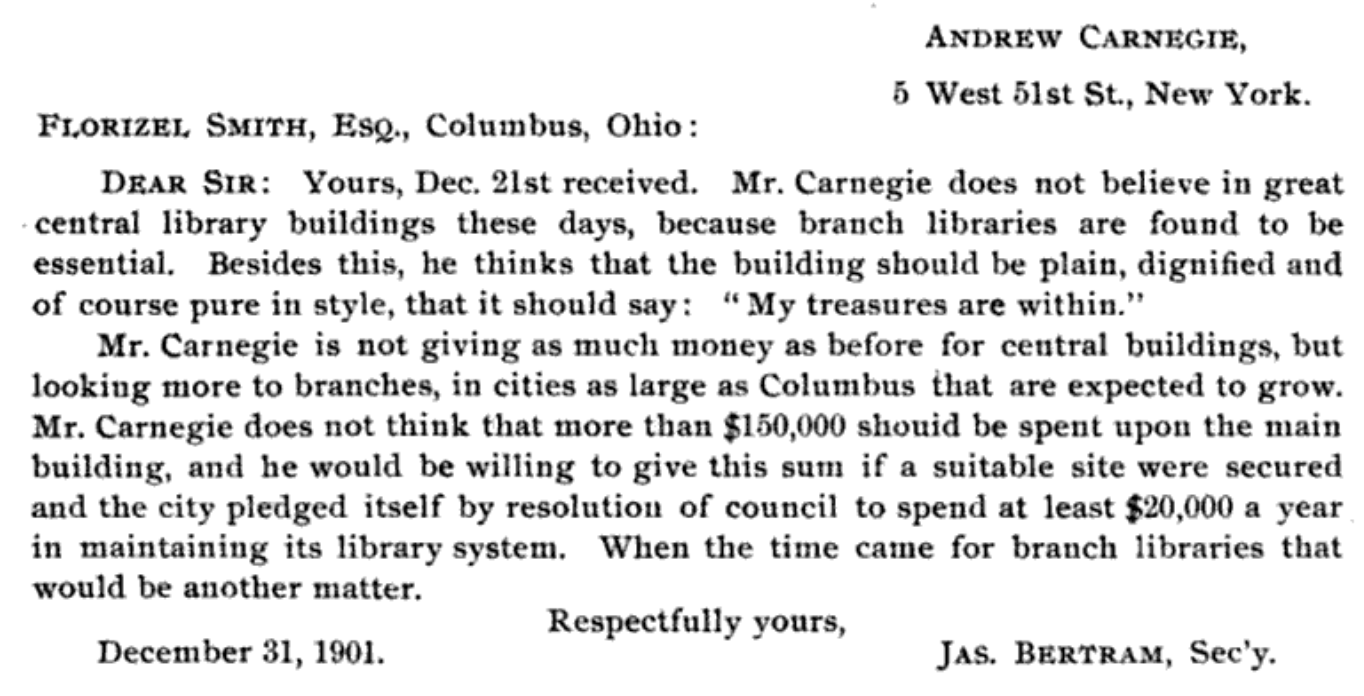
Letter from Carnegie's secretary offering to fund the library

The site at 96 S. Grant Avenue was the location of the Judge Noah Swayne house (also known as the Thomas Ewing Miller house), the official residence of six Ohio governors, including future president Rutherford B. Hayes. The house was demolished to make way for the library. Construction lasted from 1903 to 1906 at a cost of $310,000; the city covered the remaining cost and agreed to pay at least $20,000 per year in maintenance and growth, a stipulation of Carnegie's gift.

Carnegie's library was dedicated on April 4, 1907; the event included an address by the governor, as well as a message from Carnegie read by Ohio Library Association president Burton E. Stevenson. In 1921, when the City Hall building burned, the library housed the mayor and city officials until the construction of the new city hall.

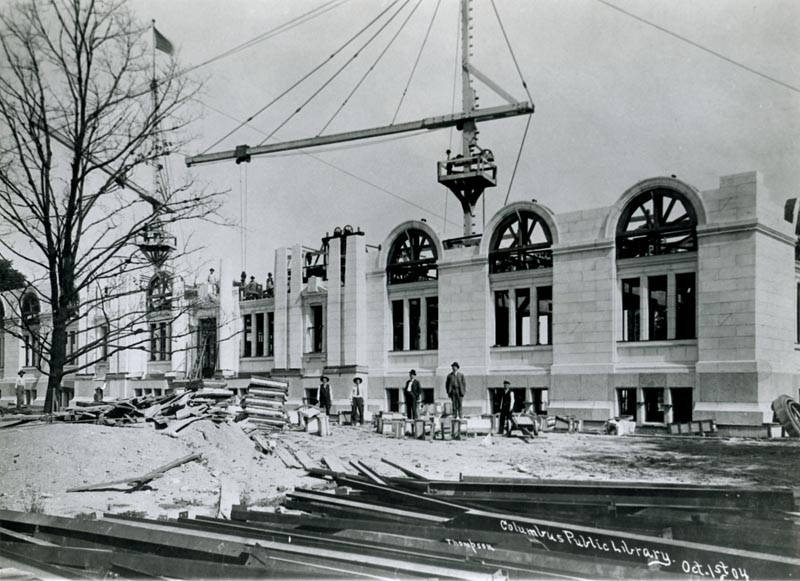
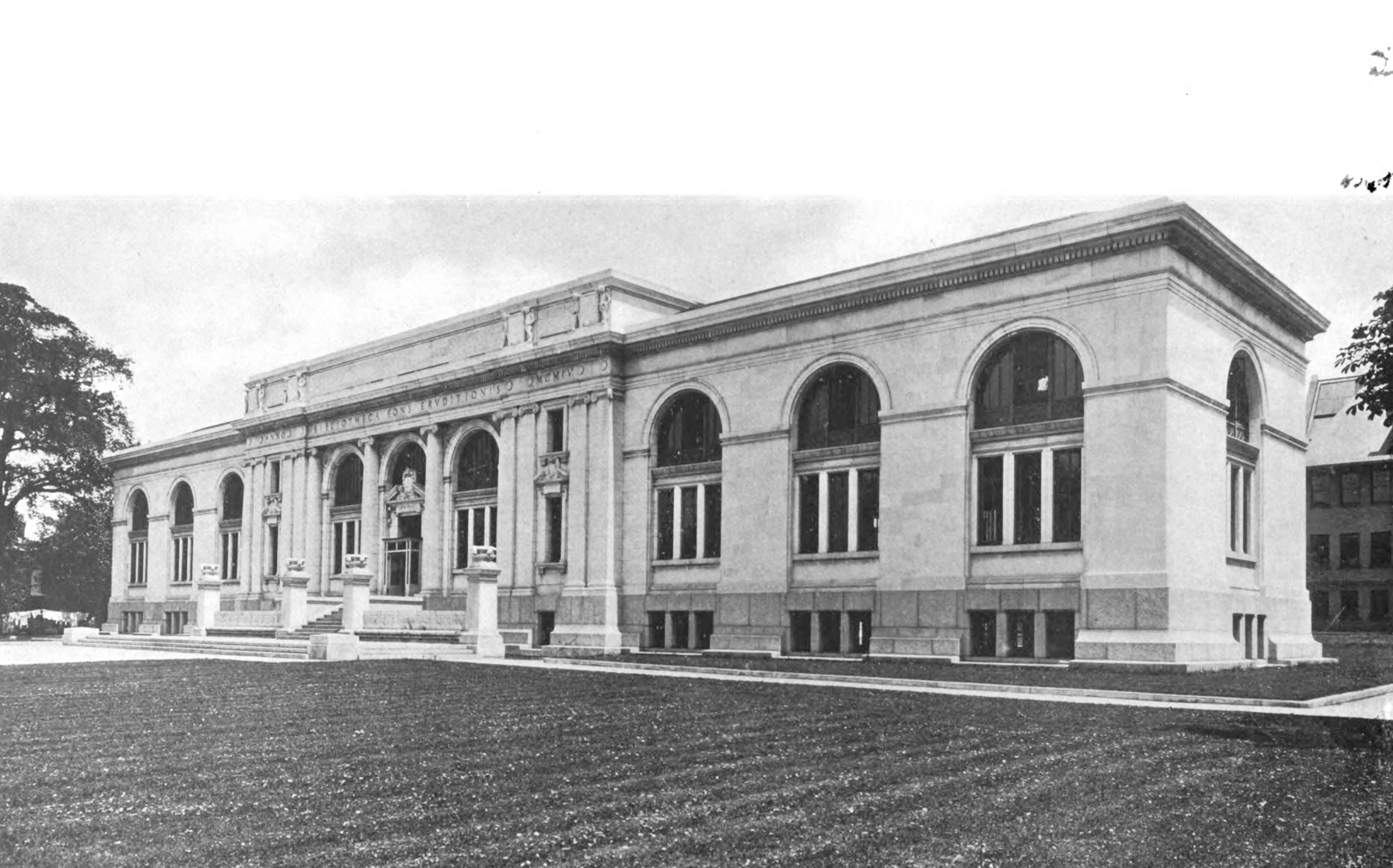
Construction in 1904 and completed building c. 1907

=== Renovations ===
Since it initially opened, the library has undergone several major renovations and expansions to accommodate the city's increasing population. There were four additions and renovations: in the 1950s, 1961, 1990–1991, and 2015–2016. In 1953, the first expansion of the library opened, followed by a 15,000-square-foot annex in 1961. The Carnegie building was renovated in 1989, and the 1953 and 1961 additions were demolished.

The 1990–1991 renovation cost $39 million, funded by a tax levy in the late 1980s. The renovation included an addition that tripled the library's space, from 87,000 square feet to 418,800 square feet. The renovation was finished on January 2, 1991, and dedicated on April 30, 1991, by First Lady Barbara Bush and Ohio governor George Voinovich.

In 2007, the centennial of the Main Library, the State Library of Ohio donated a 25,000-volume collection of genealogical history to the library, now located on the third floor.

In 2013, the CML was looking to connect the library building to the nearby Topiary Park. The only obstacle between the two was a small parking lot, which was part of the long-vacant Ohio School for the Deaf property. The CML purchased the property in order to obtain rights to the parking lot and replace it with a patio and park space. It paid $2.16 million for the building and its 2.24 acres in February 2013, and resold everything except the parking lot space for $1 million to the private Cristo Rey Columbus High School in March 2013. This project, inspired by the main branch of the New York Public Library and its adjoining Bryant Park, in turn inspired the CML's 2015–16 renovation of its Main Library.

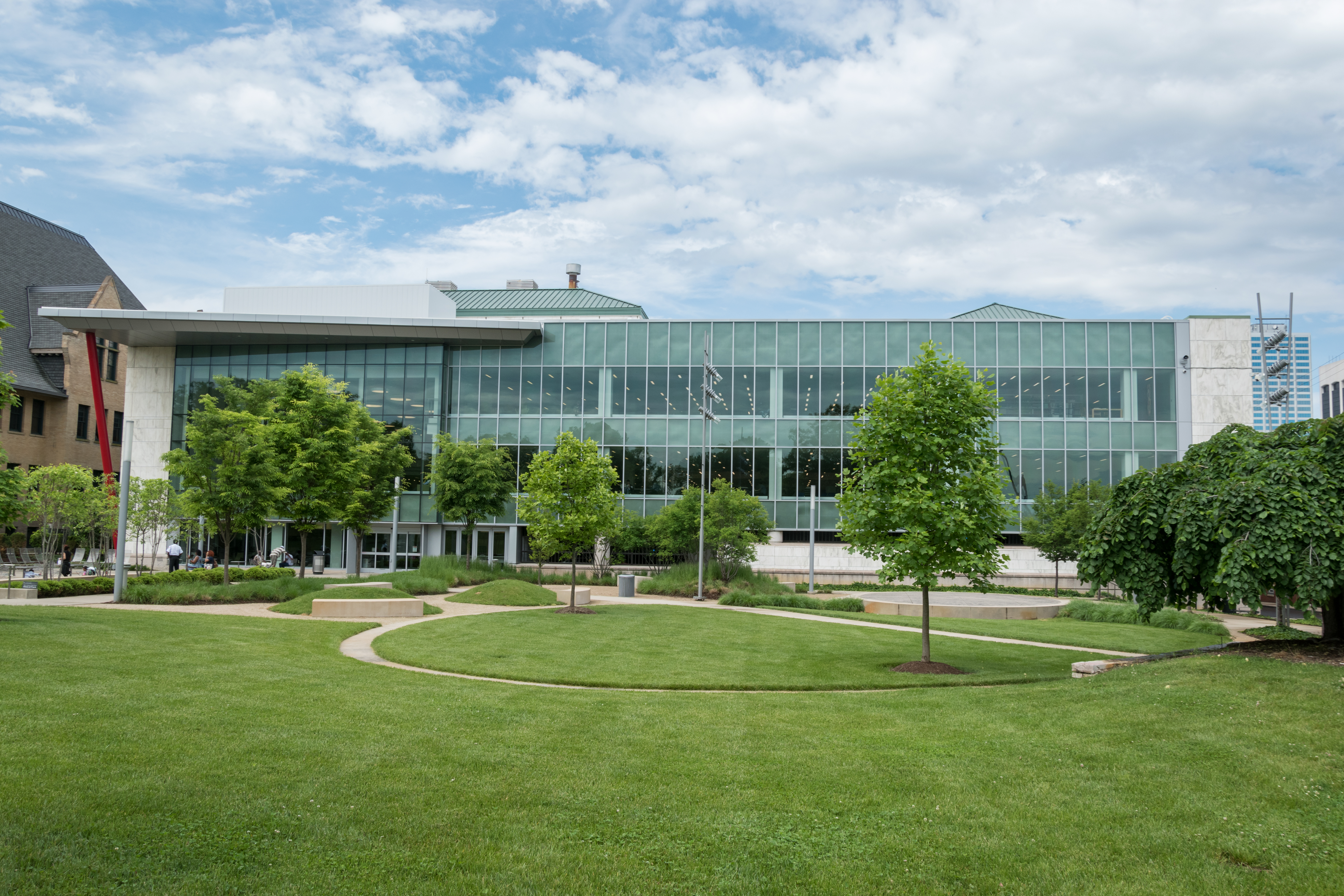
East facade after the 2015 renovation

The latest renovation had its groundbreaking on February 24, 2015. The branch closed for the project two months later, on April 13, 2015. The 1991 addition was the focus of the renovation, replacing the windowless east facade with two stories of windows overlooking Topiary Park. 80 percent of the branch's collection was moved to storage, while the rest was relocated to other branches. The renovations were scheduled to be complete by summer 2016, in time for the library to host the World Congress of the International Federation of Library Associations and Institutions.

The 2015 renovation did not increase square footage, though it redesigned the library's space to reduce staff and shelf space and increase multimedia space; it reduced the Main Library's capacity from approximately 1 million volumes down to 300,000. The 1991 addition was constructed before the internet was popular, and before smartphones existed; thus, the 1991 building was built to house books. The renovation replaced the 1991 building's stone walls and heavily tinted windows with large glass curtain walls, giving views of the nearby Topiary Park, Cristo Rey Columbus High School, and Grant Medical Center. Doorways were enlarged, and the library's cafe and gift shop were relocated to the 1991 building. Most shelves were reduced to below average adult height, allowing a less obstructed view of the interior. Additionally, park space replaced a parking lot at the building's east side, bringing Topiary Park directly up to the library building. Additionally, a concrete plaza was broken up on the building's west side, restoring the size of the library's lawn.

== Architecture ==
=== Carnegie building ===
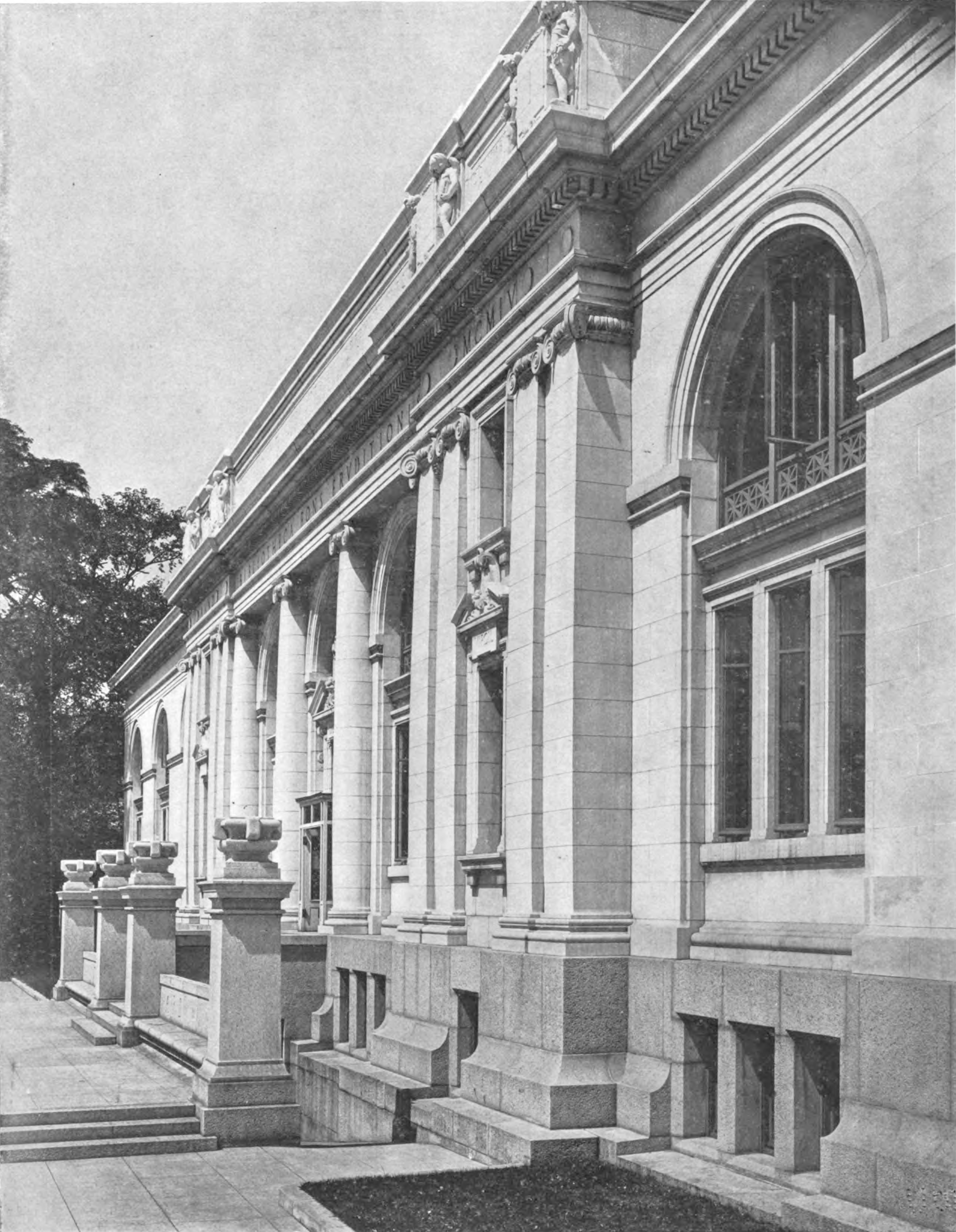
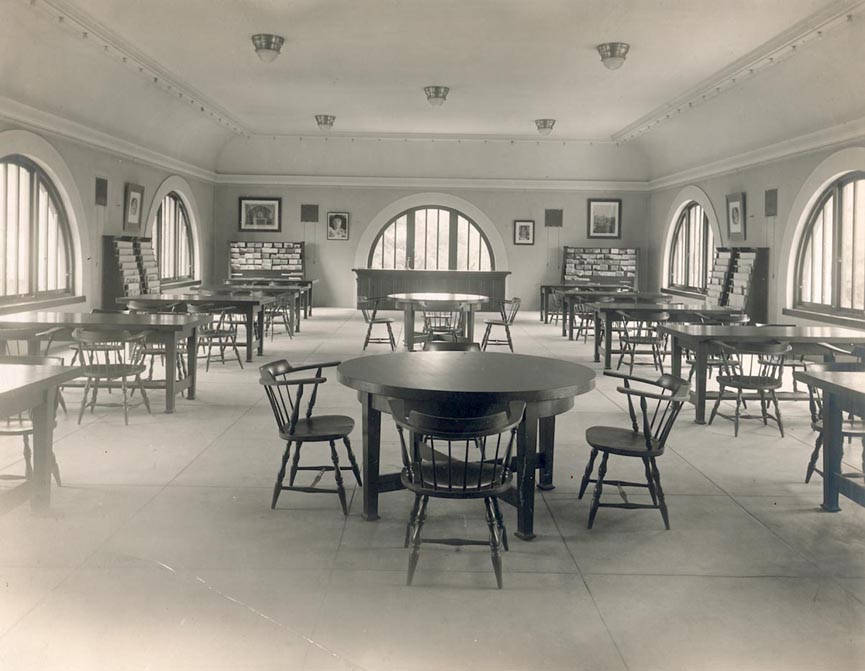
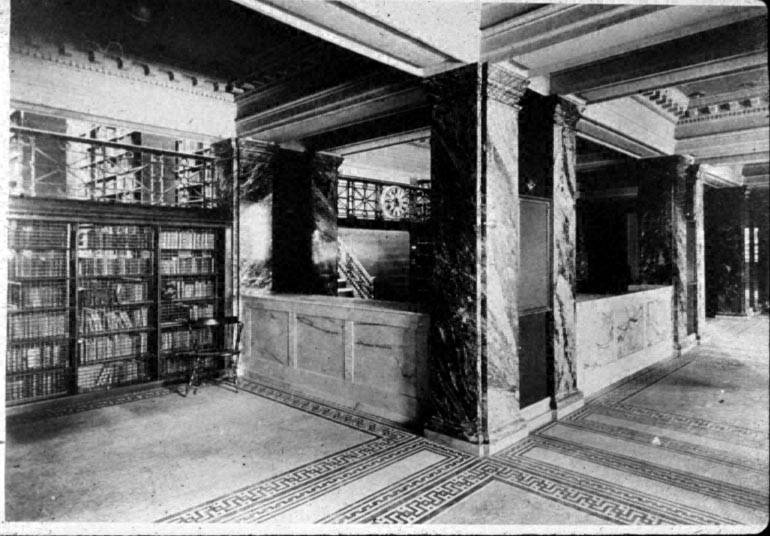
Early details: facade, periodical room, circulating desk

The original building was designed by Albert Randolph Ross of New York and Wilbur T. Mills of Columbus. It was built in a Beaux-Arts style (sometimes referred to as Second Renaissance Revival-style), using white Vermont marble on a gray granite base. It has two stories and a basement. The west facade is lively with arches, columns, friezes, and carved cherubs. A large frieze reads "Biblioteca Fons Eruditionis", or "the library, the fount of learning". A smaller frieze over the central entranceway reads "Open to all" in bold capital letters (Carnegie required that anyone use the libraries he funded). The facade also features a row of benches, with the inscription "my treasures are within" across them; this phrase was suggested to be used by Carnegie, in his letter awarding his funds. Friezes atop windows on the west facade mention the classical poets Virgil and Homer; other inscriptions credit Carnegie for funding the library and another has the Latin word "anno" followed by Roman numerals "MCMIV", meaning "the year 1904", when the cornerstone was laid.

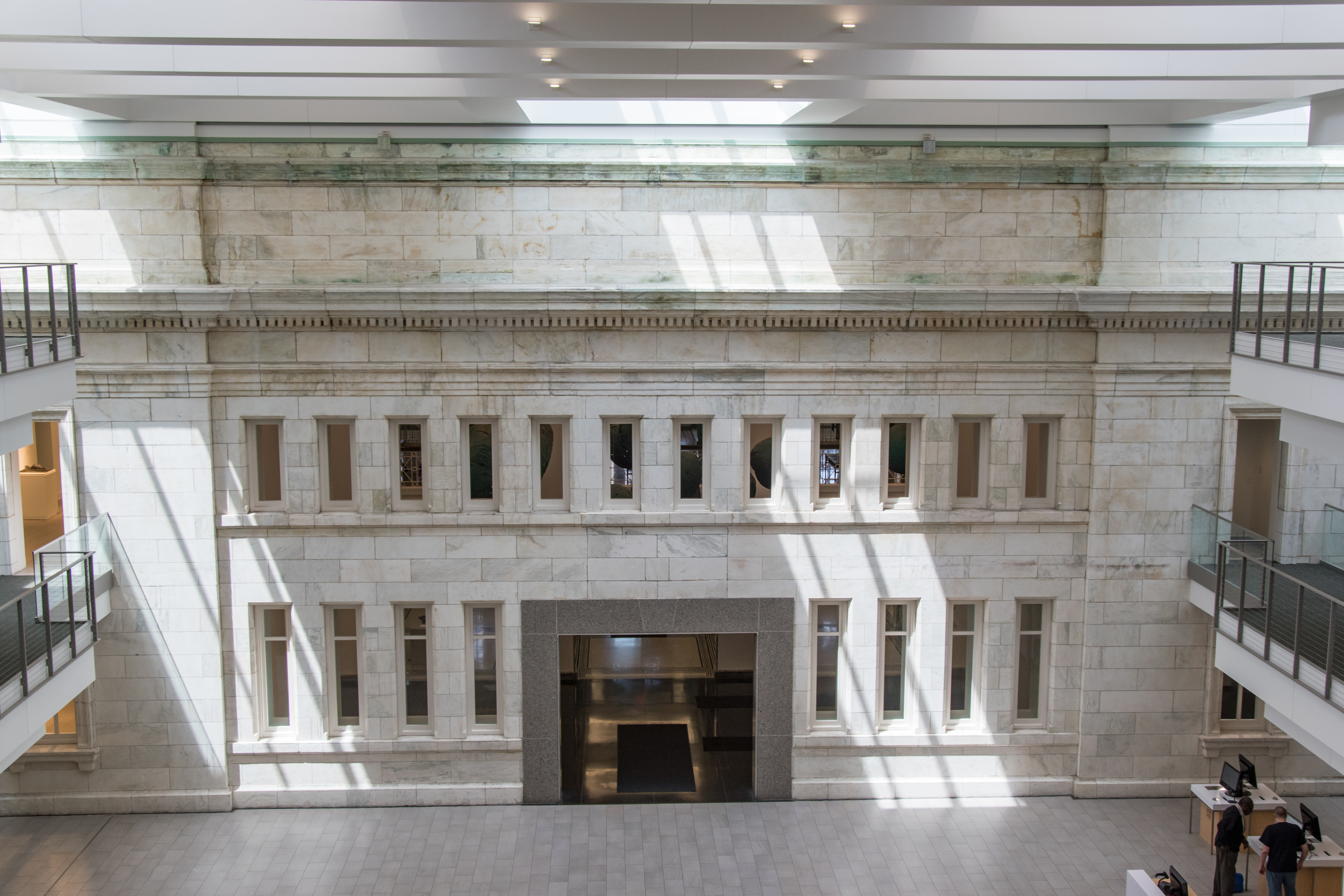
Original west facade, now part of the Grand Atrium

The interior of the Carnegie building has coffered ceilings and barrel vaults in its main corridors, along with dark green columns and pilasters, made with an imitation marble technique known as scagliola.

The building was constructed with an axial plan; the site posed no difficulties, allowing for a simple symmetrical design. The Architectural Review praised its simple plan and elegant facades, writing "we can recollect no Renaissance building of its size more charming". Its original layout included a central hall, with a main reading room and general reference room on either side, with a stack-room at the back. The central structure of the west facade is advanced about two feet from its two wings, and features Ionic columns and pilasters, as well as a larger attic, giving the structure more prominence. The Carnegie building has 31,200 square feet.

=== 1991 building ===
The 1991 building was designed with a marble exterior and a round-arched entrance on the north side of the west facade, echoing the design of the Carnegie building. When the building was renovated in 2015–2016, most of the marble was replaced with glass curtain walls, and the round-arched entrance was replaced. The 1991 construction and 2015 renovations won the Columbus Landmarks Foundation's James B. Recchie Design Award; the latter project beat out the National Veterans Memorial and Museum and the Michael B. Coleman Government Center in 2019.

== Facilities and grounds ==
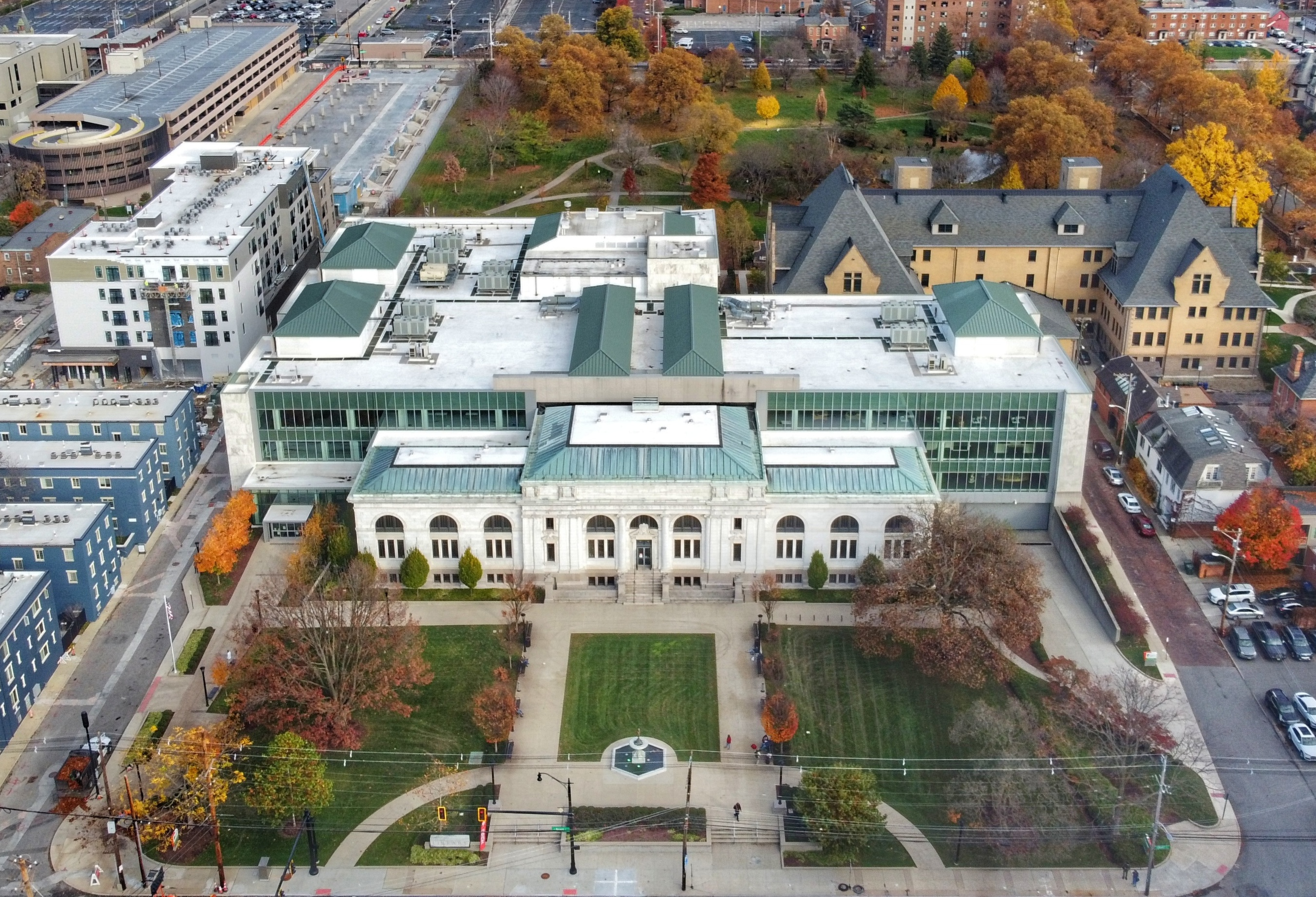
View of the 1907 building and expansion, Cristo Rey Columbus High School, and Topiary Park

The extended library has three floors. The first floor contains the Grand Atrium, the children's section, an auditorium, meeting rooms, a gallery, a gift shop, and Carnegie's Cafe. The second floor features a reading room, newspaper room, teen room, a staff area, the fiction section, multimedia, and the Carnegie Gallery. The third floor houses the nonfiction and reference sections, local history and genealogy, a digital lab, and space for the Franklin County Genealogical & Historical Society. An atrium links the old building and the new. The main reading room, created in the 2015–2016 renovation, can seat 800 people.

In the center of the west lawn is Peter Pan, a fountain and sculpture donated to the library, sculpted by Mary Elizabeth Cook in 1927 and dedicated May 18, 1928.

The building features art by central Ohio artists throughout. These include three commissioned works: Vanitas by Todd Salughter, located in the Carnegie building's atrium; and Life in Sellsville 1871–1900 and Life in the Blackberry Patch, 1900–1930 by Aminah Brenda Lynn Robinson, located in the new Grand Atrium.

=== Topiary Park ===
Topiary Park is a public park adjacent to the library, constructed in the late 1980s and early 1990s and designed by James and Elaine Mason. The park's central feature is a topiary garden, designed to depict figures from Georges Seurat's 1884 painting, A Sunday Afternoon on the Island of La Grande Jatte. It is the only park based entirely on a painting. The library's 2015–16 renovation included seating and parkland constructed between the library and Topiary Park. One of the goals of the renovation was to better join the library to the park.

== Operations ==
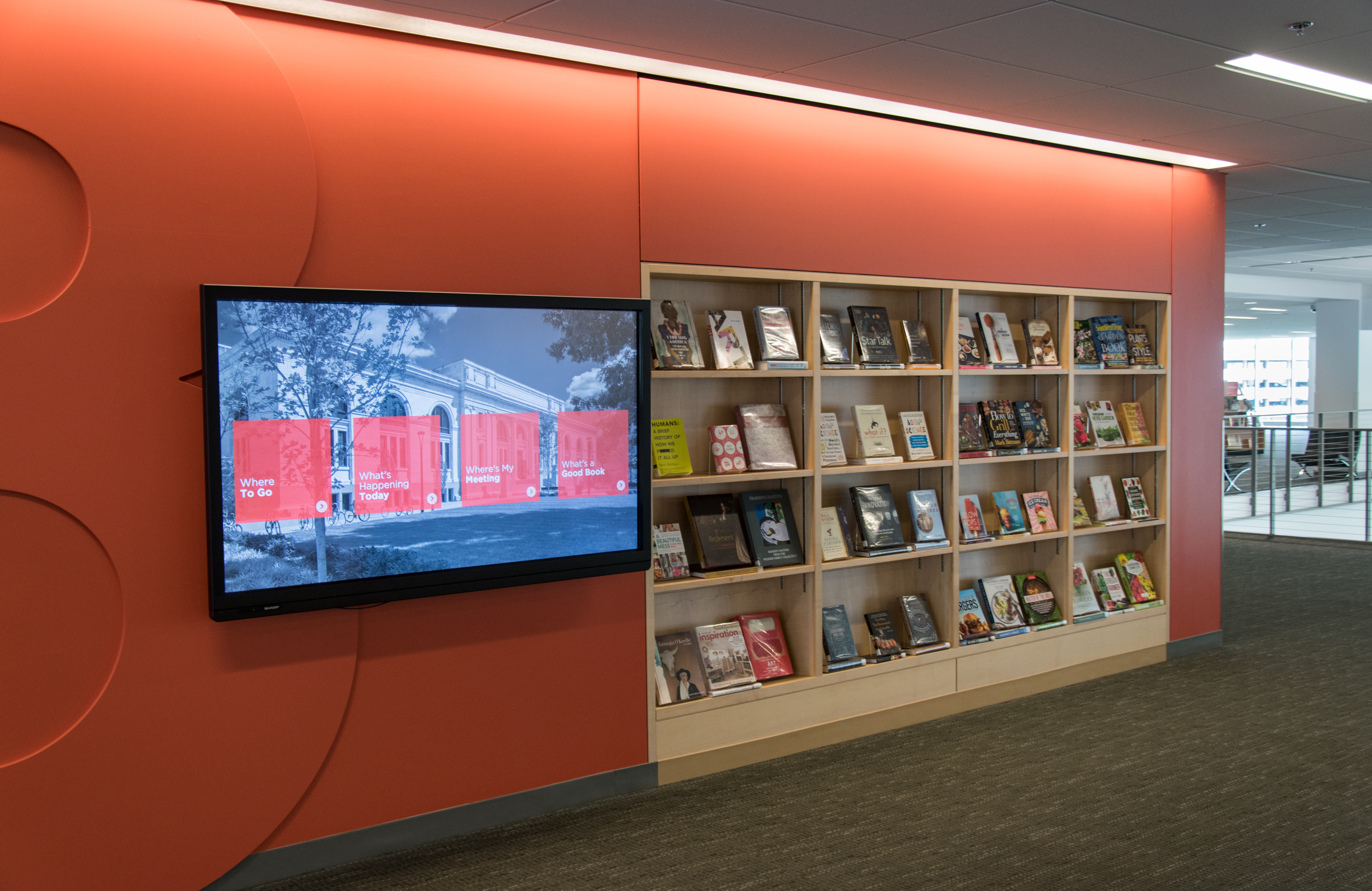
Third floor discovery board

The Main Library is open seven days per week. Services offered include wireless internet, public computers and tablets, and discovery boards (consoles that aid in navigating the library and learning about it). Activities for children include children's book narrations, a reading practice area, a homework help center, a study center for teens, and a media lab. Historical and genealogical services include access to 70,000 books, records, and other materials, as well as a discovery board that highlights newly digitized materials and historic areas of Columbus.

The library currently serves a portion of the city's homeless population, as the facility offers warmth, drinking fountains, bathrooms, computers, and homeless-specific resources.

== Organizations ==
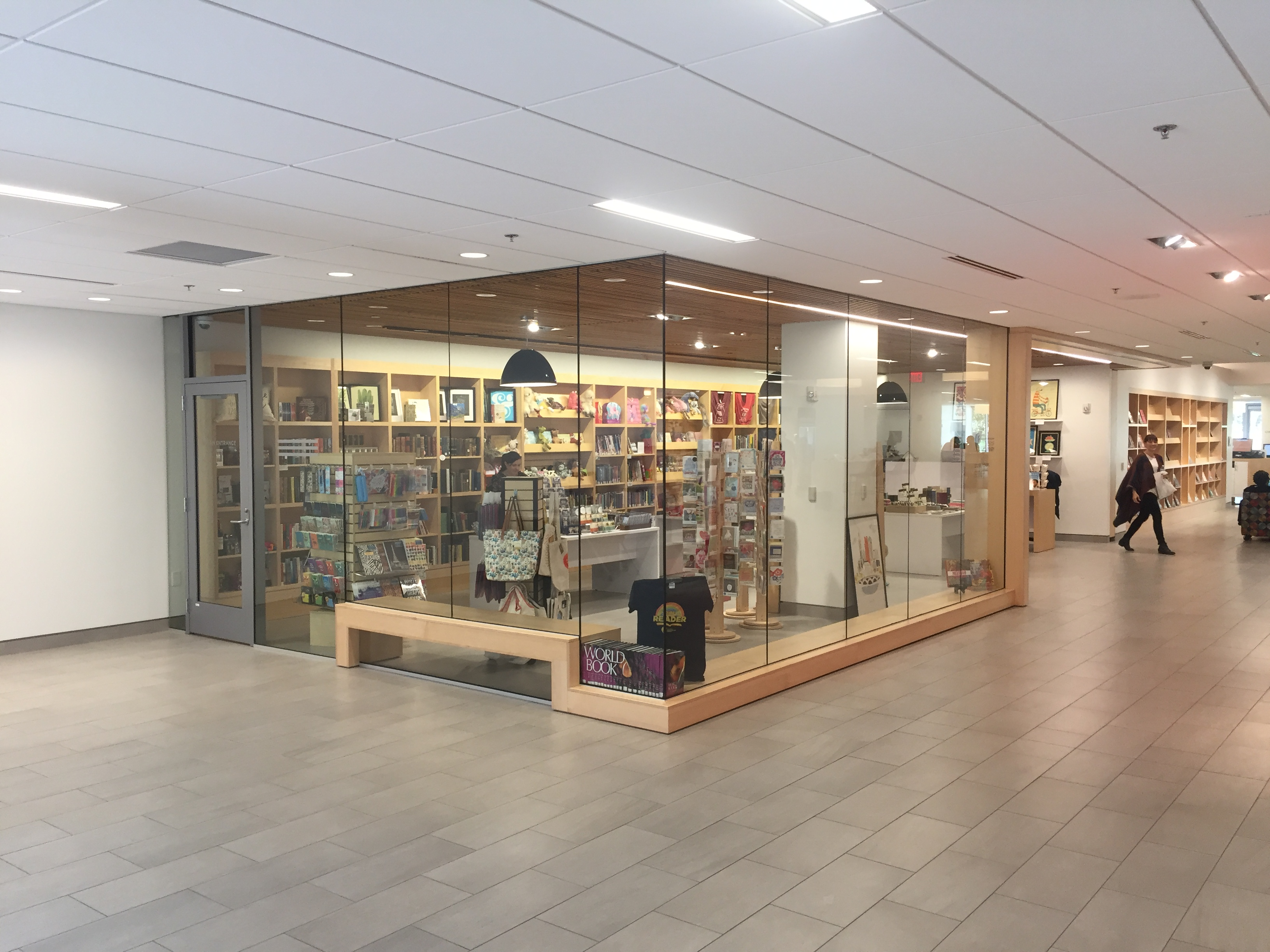
The branch's gift shop, operated by the Friends of the Library

The Friends of the Columbus Metropolitan Library, a 501(c)(4) nonprofit organization, operates the library store, on the first floor of the library's new wing. The store sells books, gifts, music, clothing, and other branded items. The organization also operates a biannual sale of about 18,000 books, graphic novels, CDs, and DVDs (materials from the library that are worn or not in demand) at the branch, which raises about $15,000 each occurrence.

== See also ==
- List of Carnegie libraries in Ohio
