= MS Peter Pan =

Danish cruiseferry built in 2022

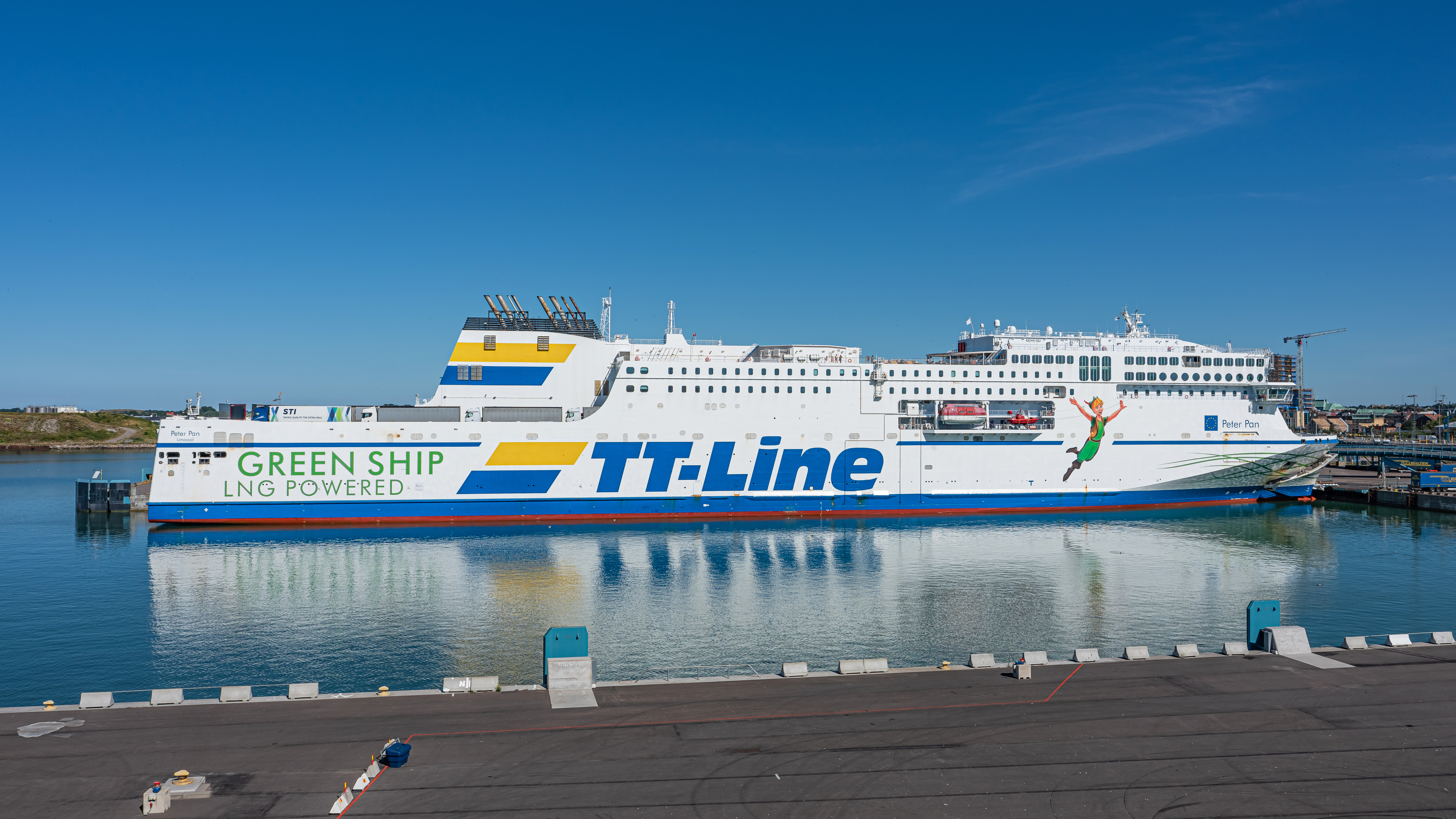
- Peter Pan in Trelleborg Harbour, 2024

History
- Name: Peter Pan
- Namesake: Peter Pan
- Owner: TT-Line
- Operator: TT-Line
- Port of registry: Limassol, Cyprus
- Route: Trelleborg to Travemünde, Rostock and Świnoujście
- Builder: CSC Jinling
- Yard number: JIN LING 89 / JLZ8180223
- Launched: 14 July 2021
- Completed: 28 November 2022
- Maiden voyage: 31 January 2023
- Identification: IMO number: 9880946; Call sign: 5BBY6; MMSI number: 210510000
- Status: In service

General characteristics
- Type: Ro-Pax cruiseferry
- Tonnage: 56,138 GT
- Length: 229 m (751 ft 4 in)
- Beam: 31 m (101 ft 8 in)
- Draught: 6.7 m (22 ft 0 in)
- Decks: 12
- Installed power: 2 MAN 8L51/60DF; 2 MAN 6L51/60DF
- Propulsion: 2 aft controllable pitch propellers; 3 bow thrusters (2.5 MW each)
- Speed: 22 knots (41 km/h; 25 mph)
- Capacity: Passengers: 866; Cabins: 239; Cars: 920; Lane metres: 4,600
- Crew: 66

MS Peter Pan is a cruiseferry owned and operated by the German shipping company TT-Line on Baltic Sea crossings.

== History ==
Peter Pan is the sixth TT-Line ship to bear the name, replacing the lengthened, 2001 vessel, which was renamed Tinker Bell. She was built by the Chinese shipyard Nanjing Jinling and entered service in 2023. Together with Nils Holgersson, she is the longest ship in the fleet at 230 metres (754 ft 7 in).

== Layout ==
There are over 3,500 square metres (38,000 sq ft) of public areas, including 1,200 square metres (13,000 sq ft) of outside deck. The four vehicle decks can accommodate 920 cars or 220 trucks. There are 32 charging stations for electric vehicles on Deck 5.

- Deck 9: Cabins and a sauna
- Deck 10: Cabins, restaurant, bar, Driver's Restaurant
- Deck 11: Restaurant, sun deck, shop, sports bar, Family Lounge, Kids Area, Coffee Lounge, Trucker Lounge, conference rooms, Pet Lounge
- Deck 12: Panorama deck

Her four dual-fuel main engines can run on liquefied natural gas (LNG) and low-sulfur marine gas oil. There is 1,000 cubic metres (260,000 US gal) LNG storage, which can power the ship for 14 days. The engines weigh approximately 120 tons each and give a total power output of 29.4 megawatts (39,400 hp).

Peter Pan and sister ship, Nils Holgersson were designed as "Green Ships". They have LED lighting and low-heat transition windows throughout. The propeller shafts are air-sealed to prevent seawater pollution by lubricants. The hull design is optimized to lower water resistance and the underwater hull is painted with a silicon-based coating to reduce fuel consumption. The ships' heating, ventilation, and air conditioning systems utilise heat from the main engines' exhaust gases and energy-free cool air from seawater's coldness (Alaska-Cooler system).

== Service ==
Peter Pan operates day and night crossings of the Baltic Sea, from Trelleborg in Sweden, serving the German ports of Travemünde and Rostock, and Świnoujście in Poland.
