= Columbus City Hall (1872–1921) =

Former city hall for Columbus, Ohio, U.S.

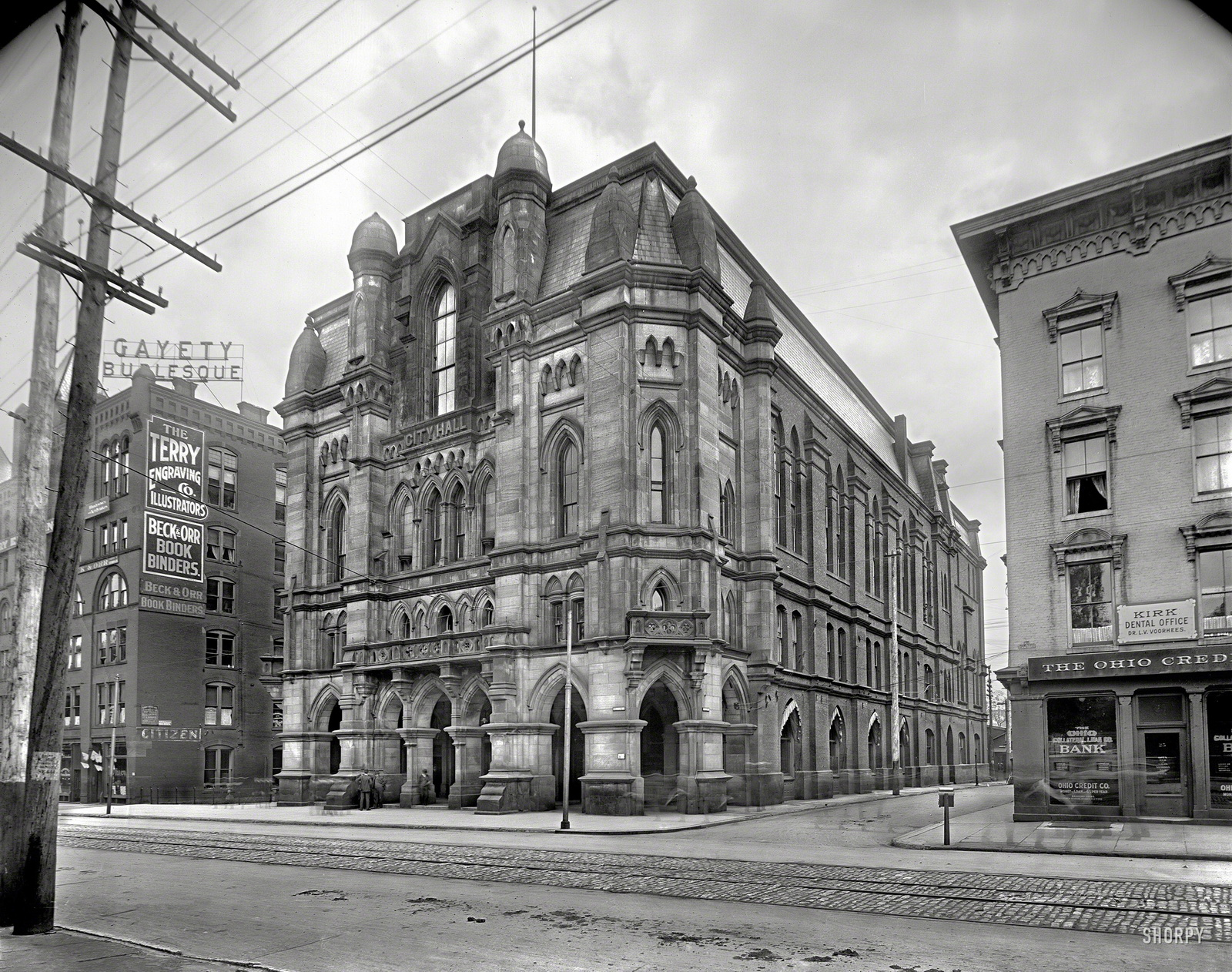
- The building c. 1900-1910
- Site of the building

General information
- Architectural style: Gothic Revival
- Location: Columbus, Ohio
- Coordinates: 39.960025°N 82.998937°W
- Groundbreaking: May 1869
- Opened: March 28, 1872
- Destroyed: January 12, 1921

Technical details
- Floor count: 3

Design and construction
- Architect: Robert T. Brookes

Columbus City Hall was the city hall for Columbus, Ohio, located on Capitol Square in the city's downtown. The building served the mayor and city council from its construction in 1872 until its demolition in 1921. The building was the founding site for the United Mine Workers of America in 1890. In 1928, the site became home to the Ohio Theatre, and the current Columbus City Hall opened nearby.

This city hall had three floors, including a post office and library space on the first floor, meeting rooms and offices on the second, and a large public hall on the third. The building housed Columbus's first public library, from 1873 until it expanded and moved in 1906.

== History ==
The Columbus municipal government established its first permanent offices at the Central Market, operating from its second floor from 1850 to 1872. Construction for the Capitol Square-area building began in May 1869, and the building's opening ceremony was held on March 28, 1872. The total cost, including for the property, was $175,000 to $185,000.

During the building's operation, it hosted numerous galas and events. The opening ceremony was reportedly a success, with hundreds to thousands attending. Speeches were followed by dancing into the late night. The building also hosted Benjamin Butler, Carl Schurz, and Willie Redmond. Governor William Allen's inaugural ball was held there in 1874, as well as a reception for Ulysses S. Grant in 1879. Numerous state conventions were held in the space, in addition to state and city meetings, gatherings honoring Civil War generals, legislative banquets, and election night gatherings.

The building was the founding site for the United Mine Workers of America in 1890.

=== Destruction ===
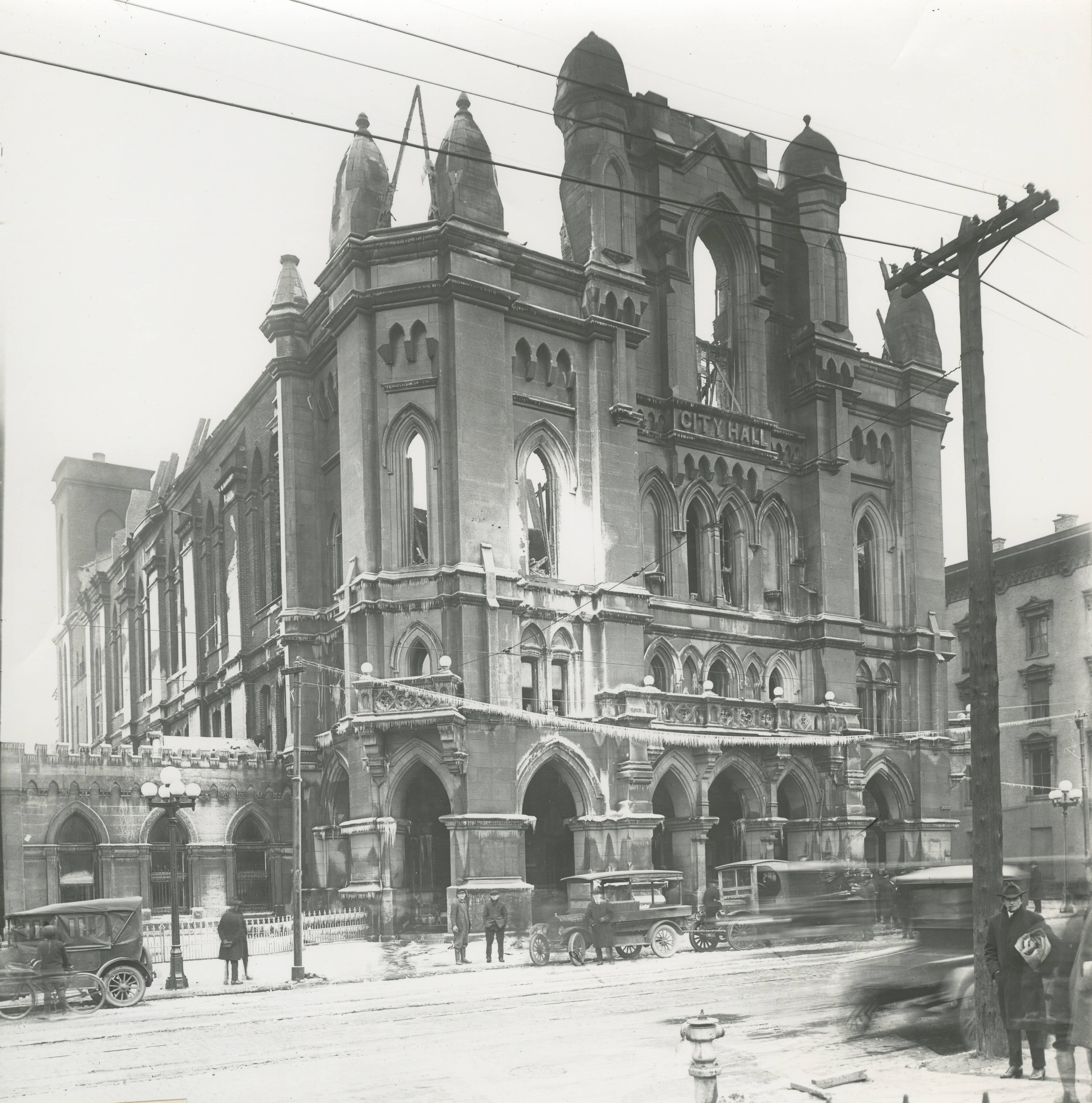
City Hall one day after the fire

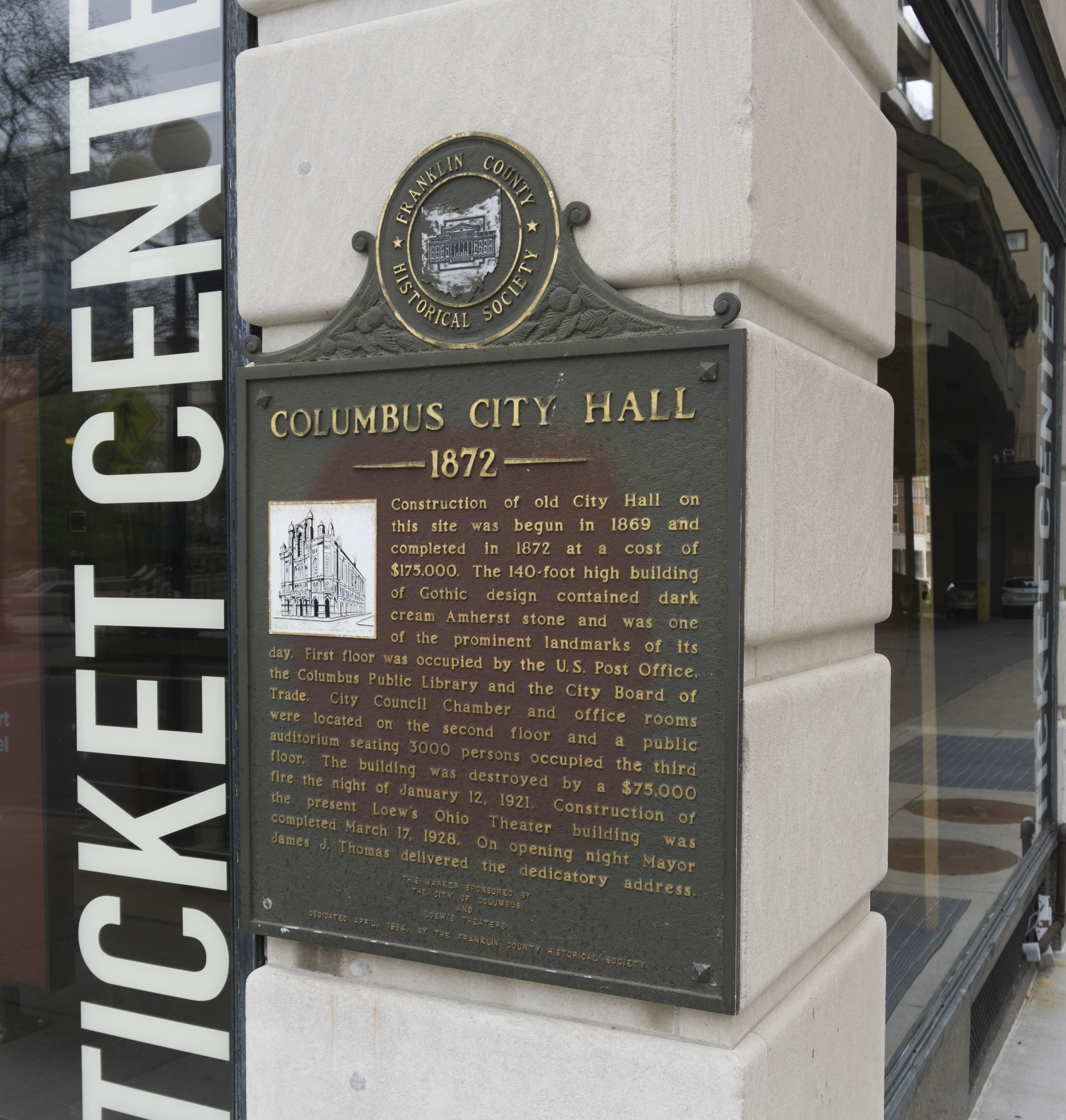
Plaque at the Ohio Theatre commemorating the building

City Hall was demolished in a fire that began about 8 p.m. on January 12, 1921. At the time, about 100 people were attending a basketball practice inside, and others were attending a meeting of City Council at the same time. There were no injuries during the incident. James Thurber, later known for his cartoons, was covering the City Council meeting as a Columbus Dispatch reporter. Sixteen engine companies and six truck companies arrived to fight the fire, setting numerous hoses onto the fire by 8:30 p.m. from multiple areas, including from atop the roof of the Grand Theater building.

Crowds witnessed the building fire, held back into the sloping Statehouse grounds. The crowds reportedly had few regrets or tears, and a general attitude of "good riddance" to its destruction among the public and city officials. Exterior walls remained standing, though seemingly about to topple. The entire roof burned away, and the second and third floor interiors were turned into a large pile of debris.

Property loss was estimated at about $75,000; like all city buildings at the time, it was not insured. It was the third public structure to burn in recent months, after the city prison and a more minor fire at the Columbus State Hospital. Records lost in the building's fire reportedly included those on the Franklin Park Conservatory, making much of its early history unknown. News from four days after the fire claimed all valuable documents and records were saved, though the Children's Playhouse Project was affected. About 5,000 costumes were lost, as well as four sets of scenery and several pageant lights. This combined loss was estimated at $6,300. In addition, thousands of city codes were lost, as well as all bound copies of city bulletins and annual reports for all departments; all these documents were said to be replaceable.

By the next day, city officials toured the burned building with the determination of making the site habitable within 30 days. Following their tour, they unanimously abandoned any proposals to rebuild City Hall on that site, with most council members indicating the new riverfront civic center as the most appropriate place to rebuild. Though the origin of the fire was undetermined by this point, three theories existed: it could have been started from blowtorches left in the building's cupola by workers who were repairing the roof, one of which was found atop charred timber in the wreckage. Other ideas included defective wiring caused a spark, or that lit cigarette butts could have sparked the flames.

Two days after the fire, Columbus's library trustees offered the second floor of the Main Library to the mayor and most city officials, which they promptly accepted.

The fire allowed city leaders to rebuild City Hall with a better structure and in the new Civic Center site. Prominent citizens lauded the mayor, offering "congratulations on the successful fire". The site is now home to the Ohio Theatre.

== Attributes ==
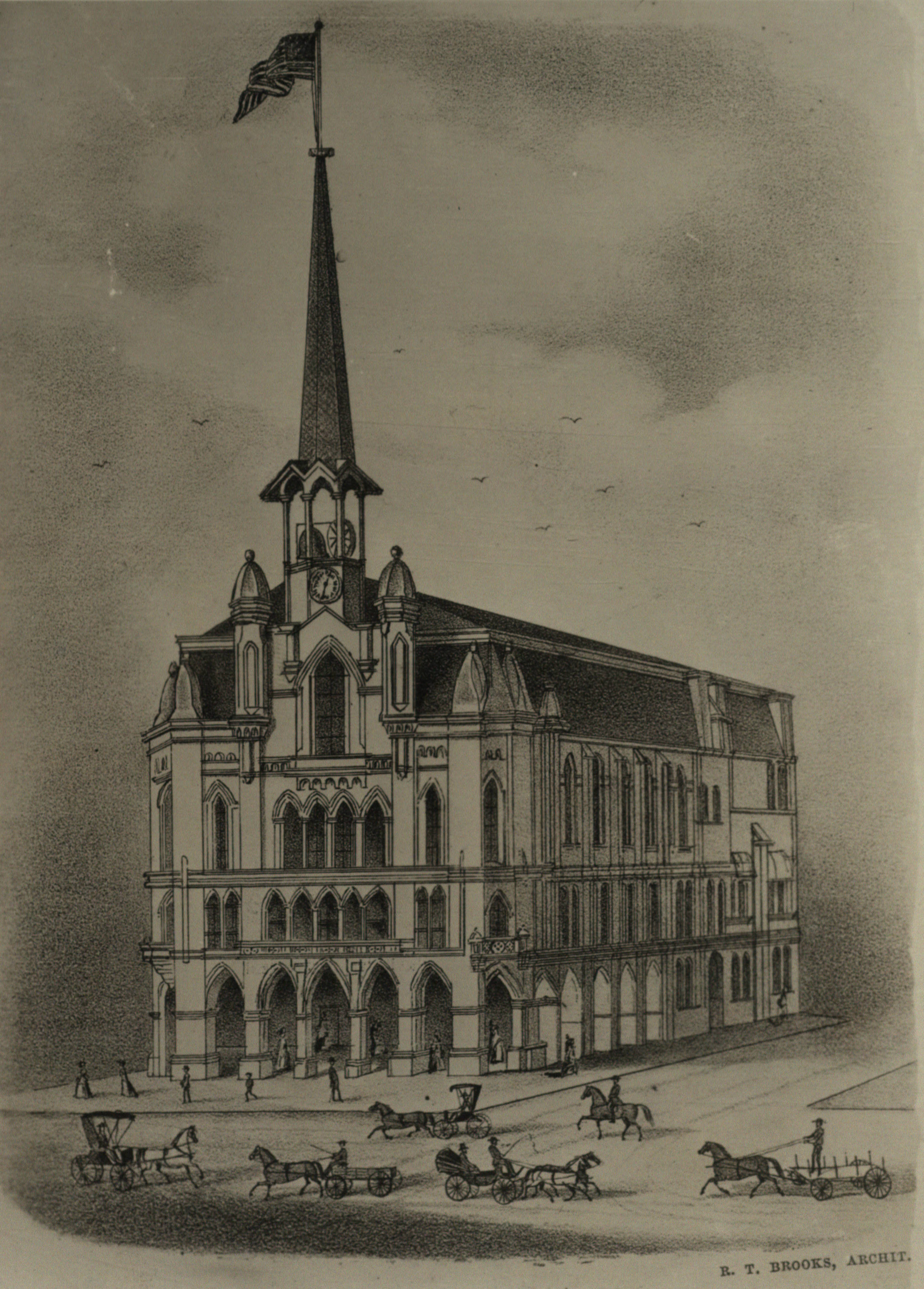
Original design for the building, including a clock tower

The building was 80 feet wide, 187.5 feet long, and 98 feet tall. It was originally set to be 140 feet tall, though its clock tower was never built. The structure was designed by Detroit architect Robert T. Brookes, designer of Towers Hall at Otterbein University and the final architect for St. Joseph Cathedral in Columbus. The building utilized dark cream-colored Amherst sandstone for its exterior walls, and had a steep roof with two pitches, both covered in blue Vermont slate. The building's entranceway included seven lancet archways, separated by massive piers. A balcony existed above the central three arches, with additional balconies above the diagonal arches on the building's northeast and northwest corners. Upper windows matched the lower arches with their lancet heads. An iron water tank stood on the southeast corner of the building by the roof.

Initially seen as a perfect example of Gothic Revival architecture, it later grew a reputation as unsatisfactory for a city hall. It was described by the Columbus Dispatch a day after the fire as "long an eyesore to Columbus", and in 2012 as a "Gothic nightmare of a building".

=== Interior ===
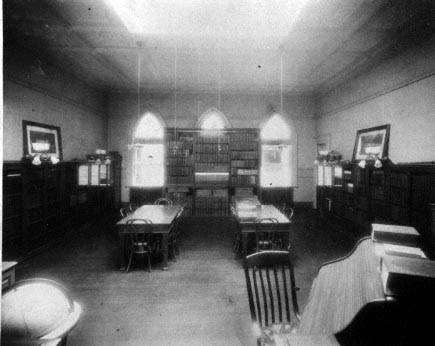
Reading room

The building's first floor had an open arcade with a variegated marble floor along its north and west sides. A central lobby included a large staircase to the second floor, while to its rear was another lobby with stairs at the sides, leading to all upper floors. To the rear of that was the merchants' exchange.

At its opening, the west side of the first floor also held the city's post office, a space including a separate fireproof room. The left or east side housed the city's first public library, a glass-divided room which opened on March 4, 1873. The front section was a reading room, while the back was reserved for books and the librarian's desk. The collection contained 1,500 books. These included 1,200 from the Columbus Athenaeum (1853-1872), 358 from Columbus's high school library, and 33 from its horticultural society. In 1906, the reading room moved to a separate building across from the Ohio Statehouse, and by 1907 to the Main Library, where it remains today.

On the second floor was another lobby with five rooms on either side, for city officials and committees. To the rear was the council chamber, an elaborately decorated space with watercolor-frescoed walls. The third floor held the public hall, a multipurpose room of 140 by 74 feet, with a height of 53 feet. It was estimated to seat 3,200 people, or give standing room to almost 6,400. A stage stood at the south end of the hall, while a gallery stood at the north end.

== See also ==
- List of demolished buildings and structures in Columbus, Ohio
