= Peter Pan (Columbus, Ohio) =

Fountain and sculpture in Columbus, Ohio, U.S.

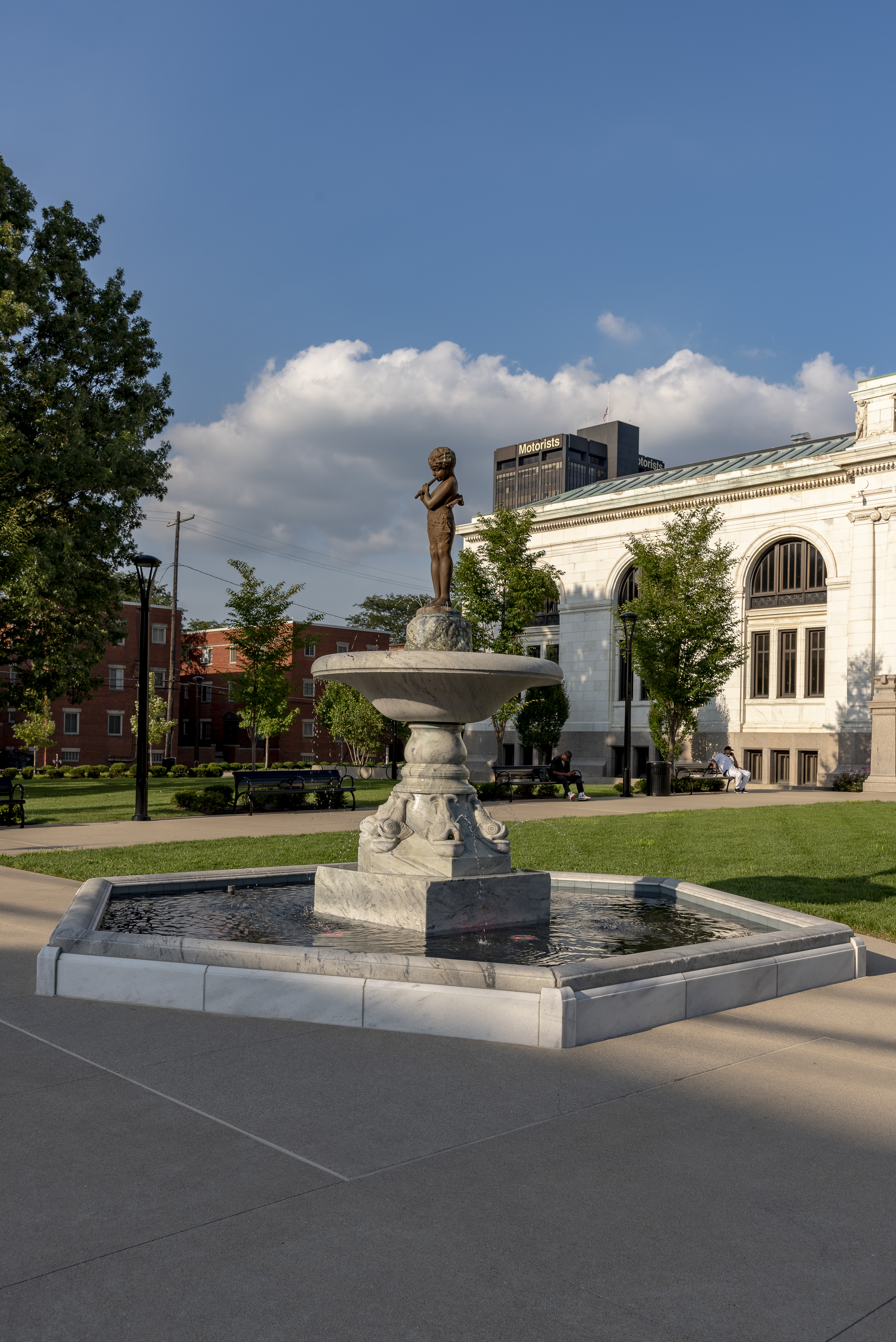
- The fountain installed outside the Main Library, 2018
- Artist: Mary Elizabeth Cook
- Year: 1927
- Medium: Bronze sculpture
- Subject: Pan
- Location: Columbus, Ohio, United States
- 39°57′40.2″N 82°59′25.5″W

Peter Pan (also known as the Munson Memorial Fountain, or simply Pan) is a 1927 fountain and sculpture depicting Pan by sculptor Mary Elizabeth Cook and architect Otto C. Darst, installed outside the Main Library in Columbus, Ohio, United States.

== Description and history ==
Peter Pan, donated by local businessman Charles E. Munson in memory of his son George Peabody Munson, was completed in 1927 and dedicated on May 18, 1928. The bronze sculpture, designed by Mary "May" Elizabeth Cook, depicts Pan as a boy playing a flute. It measures approximately 3 x 1 x 1 ft. and rests on Georgia marble base that measures approximately 1 x 2 x 2 ft. Six fish are installed at the basin's foot. The fountain's basin and base measures approximately 6.5 ft. x 75 in. x 75 in. An inscription reads: "For the / children of Columbus / In memory of / George Peabody Munson / Aged six." Zenker Sons carved and installed the fountain and sculpture.

Peter Pan was surveyed by the Smithsonian Institution's "Save Outdoor Sculpture!" program in 1992.
