= Snowden-Gray House =

Historic house in Columbus, Ohio

- U.S. Historic district – Contributing property
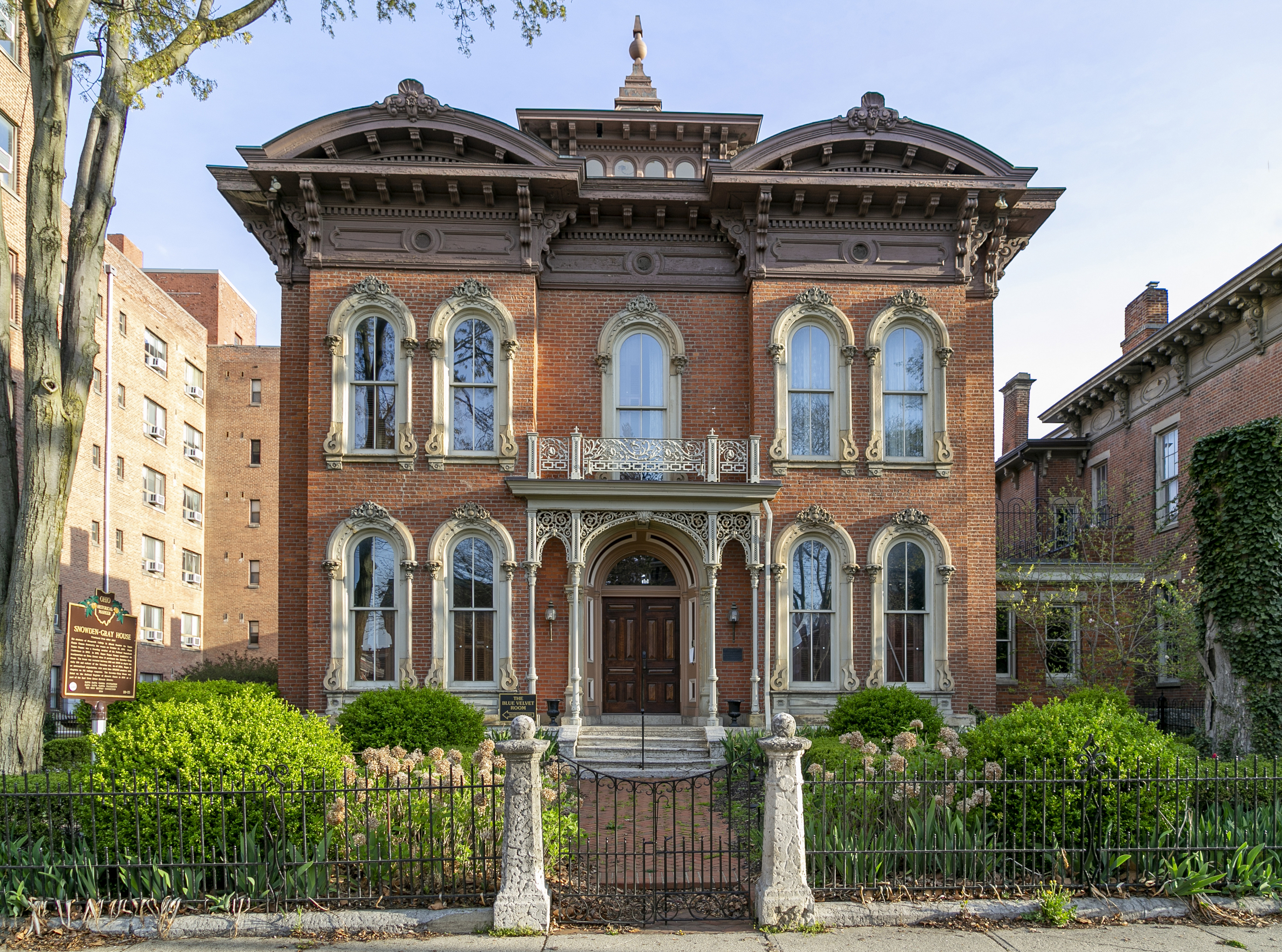
- Interactive map of Snowden-Gray House
- Location: 530 E. Town Street, Columbus, Ohio
- Coordinates: 39°57′39″N 82°59′09″W
- Area: 13,000 sq ft (1,200 m^{2})
- Built: c. 1852
- Architectural style: Italianate
- Part of: East Town Street Historic District (ID76001425)

The Snowden-Gray House is a historic house in Downtown Columbus, Ohio. The house contributes to the East Town Street Historic District, on the National Register of Historic Places and Columbus Register of Historic Properties. Built as a private home around 1852, the building later served several purposes, including as the governor's mansion for Ohio's governor during the American Civil War. From 1952 to 2018, it was the headquarters of the sorority Kappa Kappa Gamma. Beginning in 2018, a developer operated a rental and events space there for several years, until 2021.

== Attributes ==
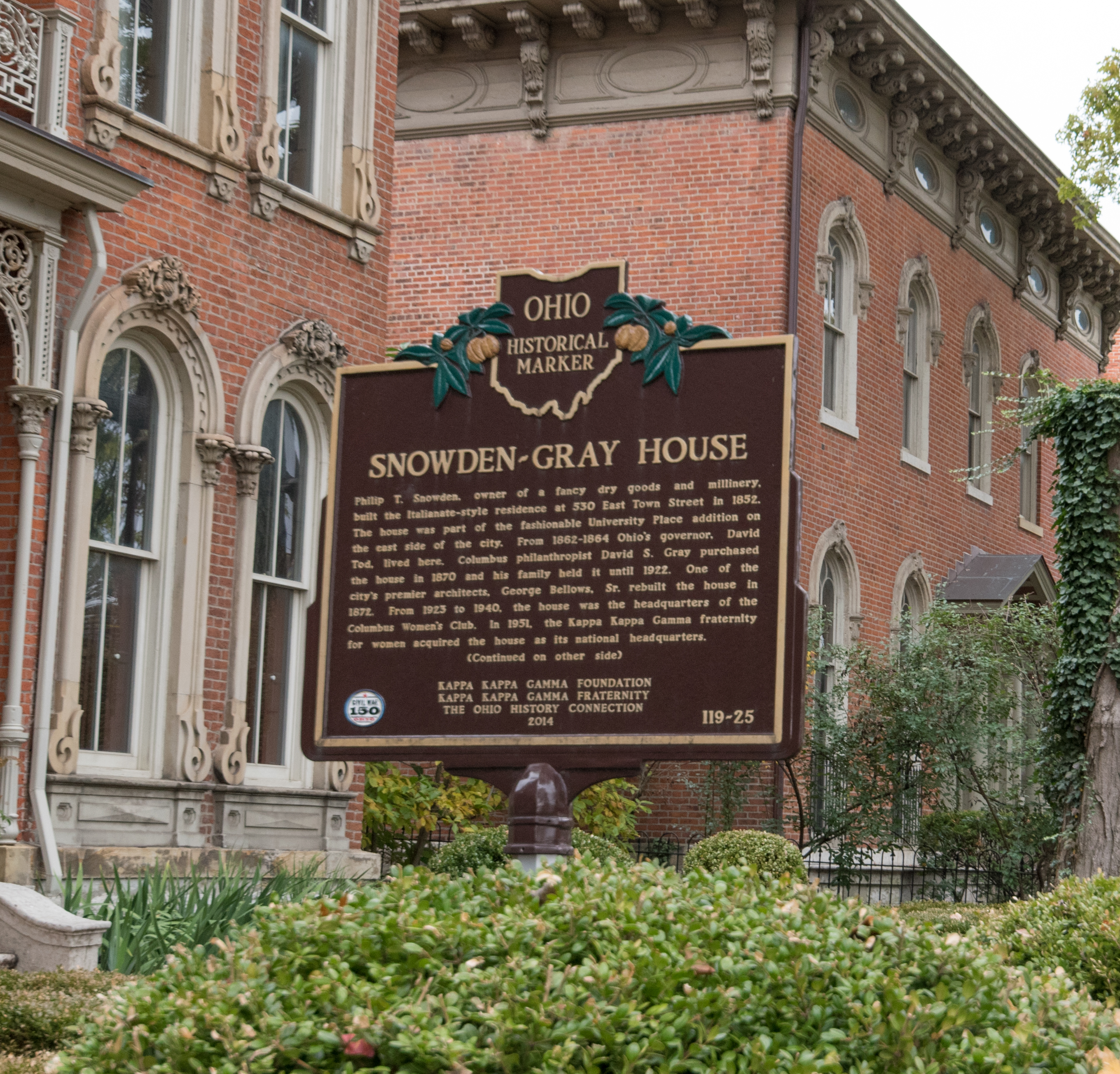
Historical marker (reverse)

The Snowden-Gray mansion is located on East Town Street in Downtown Columbus, close to Topiary Park. The surrounding Town-Franklin neighborhood is considered the city's first suburb, first subdivided in the 1840s, with early fashionable residences constructed in the 1850s, and its lots filling in during the subsequent prosperous decades. The location, eight blocks east of High Street, was considered the outskirts of Columbus in the 1850s. The house is considered to be the finest example of Italianate villa architecture in Central Ohio, and the focal point of the East Town Street Historic District. It is designed in the High Victorian Italianate style. The mansion has two-and-a-half stories, topped with a cupola or belvedere at its center, with a finial on its roof. The original structure measures 45 feet square, and has a stone foundation. The entranceway to the house is arched and paneled. It windows have ornamented stilted arch hood molding. The house's bracketed cornice is ornate as well. The property is surrounded with a wrought-iron fence with a fleurs-de-lis pattern (also the symbol of the Kappa Kappa Gamma sorority). The house's exterior has been modified, including by an addition that connects the house to its carriage house.

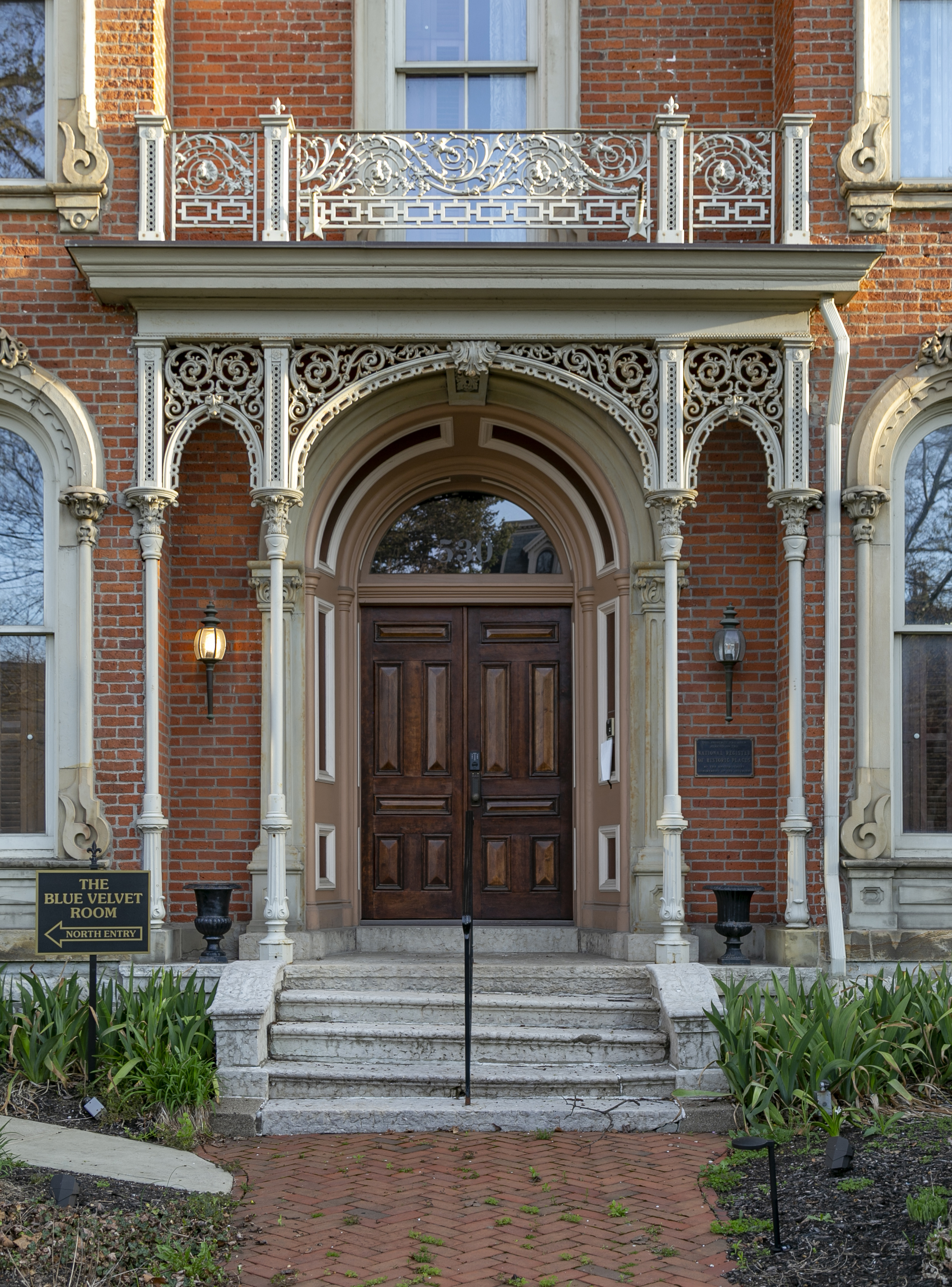
Main entrance

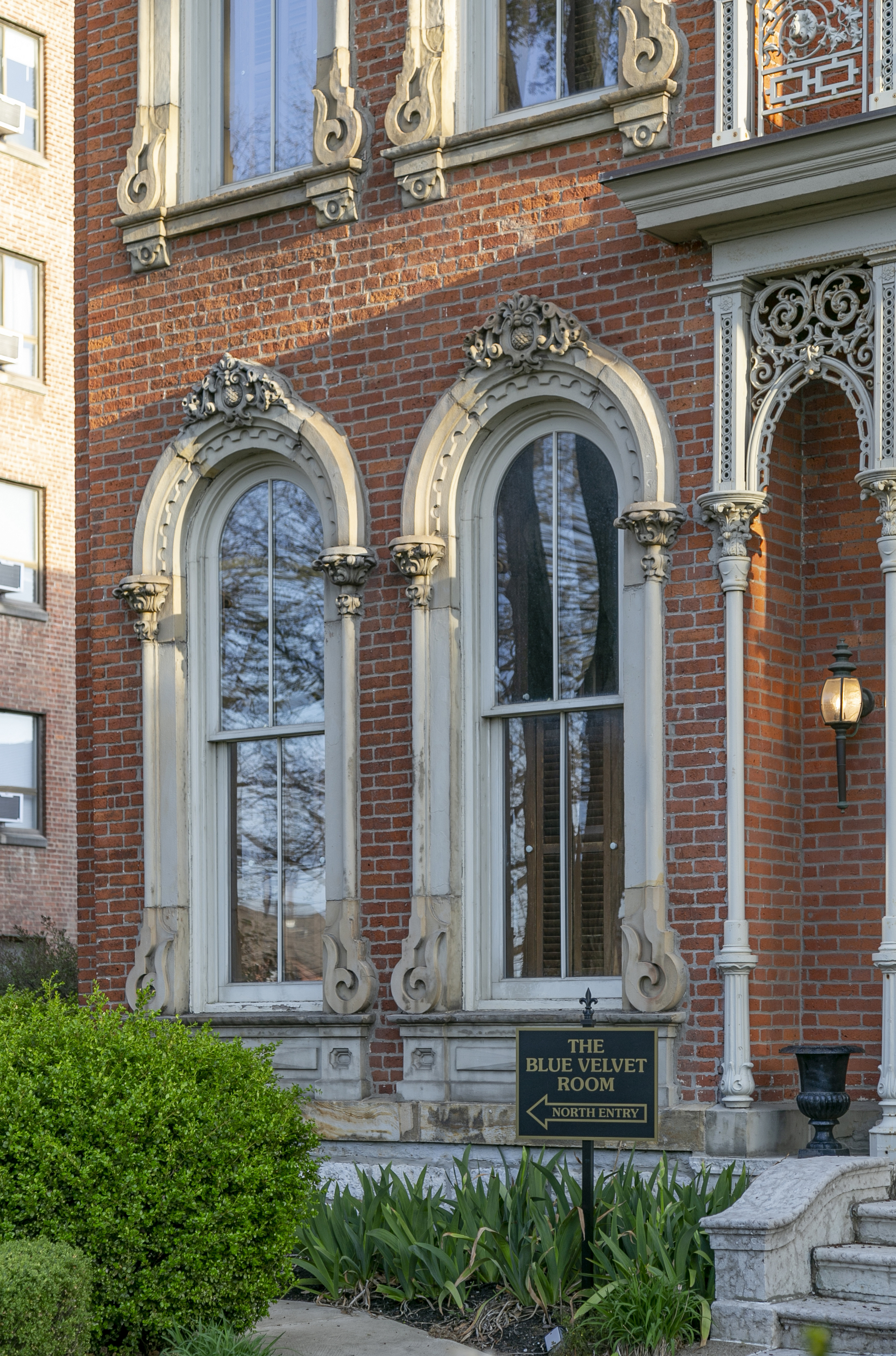
Window detail

In 1951, before its ownership by sorority Kappa Kappa Gamma, the house had a cream-colored exterior. During its sorority ownership, the house had 6,850 square feet of office space and 3,170 square feet for its library, meeting room, lounge, lunch room, kitchen, and upstairs bedrooms for visitors. Since its renovations c. 2018, the house has eight rooms and 13,000 square feet, and includes themed rooms and suites. These include the Snowden and Gray suites, the largest units in the house; a room inspired by Celinda Hatton; and the Blue Velvet Room, an events space.

The interior has fourteen-foot ceilings, a winding stairway, and a 40-foot salon with twin fireplaces made of white marble.

A historical marker located outside the house was sponsored by Kappa Kappa Gamma and the Ohio History Connection; it denotes the history and importance of the house.

== History ==
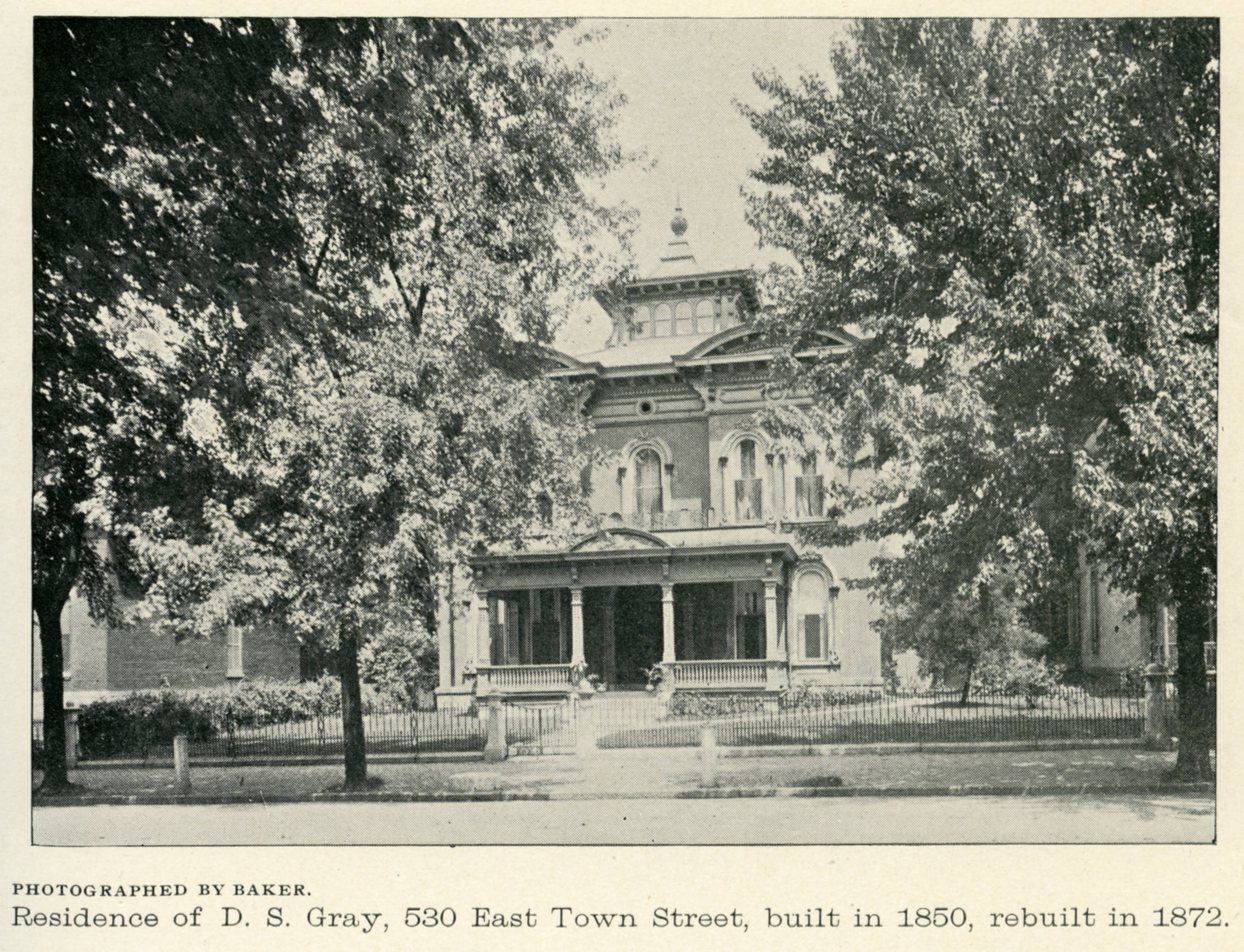
The house in 1892

The house was built for dry-goods merchant Philip T. Snowden and his wife Abigail around 1852; some sources say it was constructed in 1850. Snowden earned a great wealth dealing silks and embroideries. The house's contemporary name attributes the original owners as well as a later owner, David S. Gray. The Snowdens were friends of the Kelton family, who owned the Kelton House a few doors east of them. After about 10 years, the Snowdens lost their house and fortune, and filed for bankruptcy. The economic downturn known as the Panic of 1857 was devastating to Snowden's business, as well as many others nearby. The house was sold at a sheriff's sale in 1860, and soon became owned by the state of Ohio. During the American Civil War, the state utilized the house as a temporary governor's mansion, including for David Tod and his large family.

In 1869, David S. Gray, a philanthropist and railroad magnate, owned the house, purchased from his brother-in-law William Richards. His wife Eugenia would often hold parties at the house, and reportedly would use the house's cupola to observe her guests' outfits, allowing her time to change clothes if another female guest had a gown that mimicked or rivaled hers. The couple raised four children at the house, and was married there in 1865. In 1872, the house was reportedly rebuilt by George Bellows Sr. David Gray died there in 1921, and did not want the house to leave the family, though as early as the 1930s, the mansion became a rooming house, and later, home to the Columbus Women's Clubhouse Association. Its organizer, Celinda Hatton, is rumored to haunt the house, walking through it wearing a pink robe, holding a drink in her hand. The house is included in Columbus Landmarks' long-running "Ghosts of Town-Franklin Tour" because of the reported sightings. The building later housed a candy company, and later, apartments.

The house was considered a Columbus landmark as early as 1951. Around July 1951, Kappa Kappa Gamma purchased the Snowden-Gray House from the state, reportedly for $1. It would serve as the organization's first headquarters, and it became known as the Kappa Kappa Gamma National Headquarters. The sorority previously held its "Central Office" in the Law and Finance Building downtown, from 1929 to 1952. At the time of purchase, the house was considered to be within walking distance of Downtown Columbus. The organization moved into the house in December 1952, and became the first Greek-letter women's organization to own and operate a headquarters.

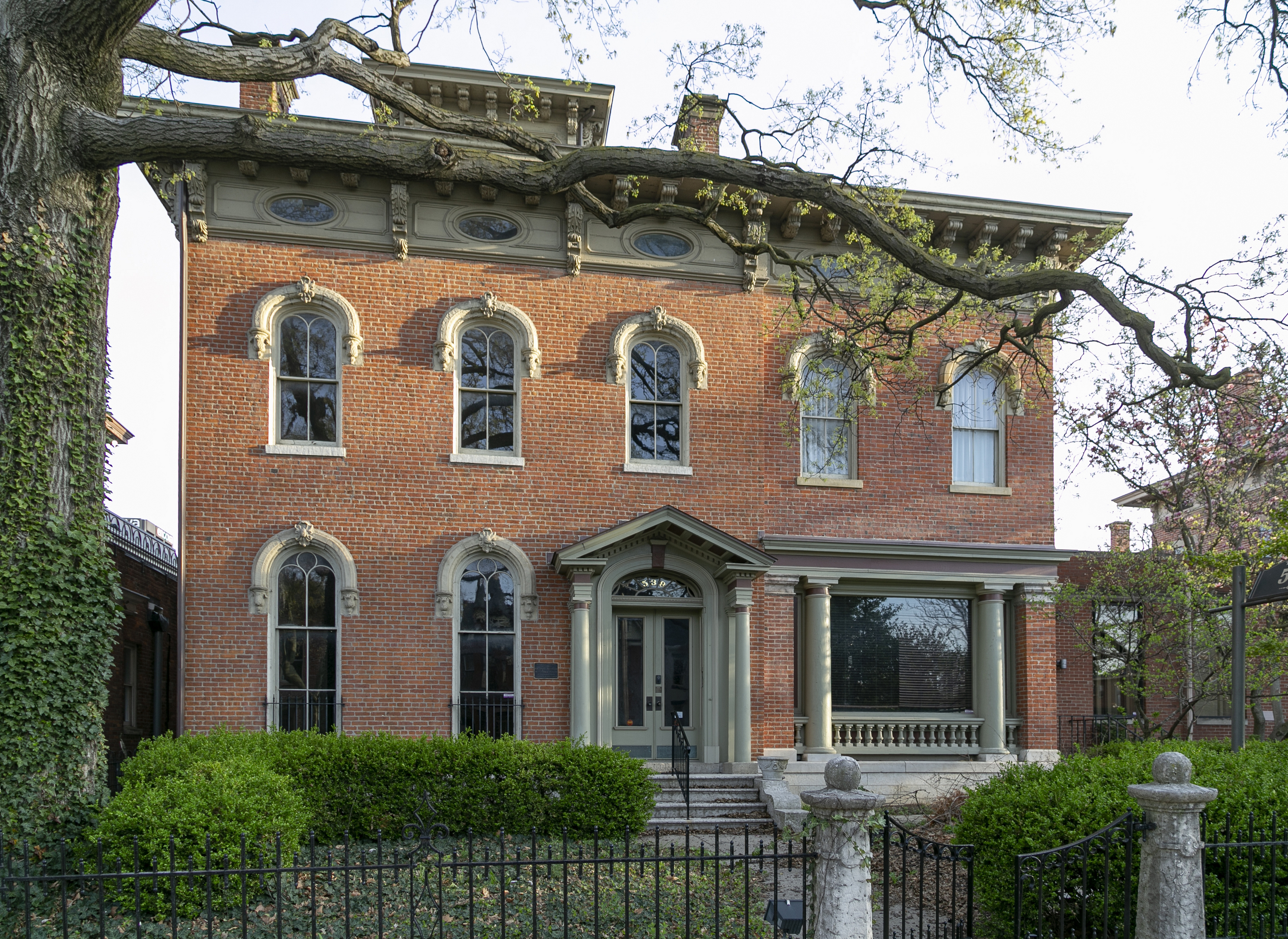
The Town-Bartlit Building

During the sorority's ownership of the house, the organization was actively involved in its upkeep and restoration. On February 11, 1965, the house faced a significant fire, which destroyed its catalogue and office machine rooms, its auditorium, and apartments. Smoke and water damaged numerous other rooms. The sorority set up a temporary office across the street, and decided to renovate and continue using the house, after considering other options. By summer 1966, the renovations were complete and the sorority moved back into the space.

In 1984, the growing organization expanded into the neighboring house, the Town-Bartlit Building at 538 E. Town Street (built in 1844 as the Benjamin L. Kelly house, joined to a neighboring house around 1940). By 2018, the organization had outgrown its space on Town Street, so on January 2 of that year, Kappa Kappa Gamma moved from the buildings to 6640 Riverside Drive in Dublin, Ohio. In 2018, real estate developer David Strause purchased the house to operate it as a rental space for private events, and to host weekly jazz shows. In 2018, the house was listed on Airbnb as a vacation rental, with options to rent sets of rooms from $100 to $300 per night, as well as an option to rent the entire house at a cost of $999 per night. After further renovation, five units were to be placed back up for rent. The business closed in 2021 amid the COVID-19 pandemic, attributing the pandemic's challenges and accompanying staffing issues.
