= Kappa Kappa Gamma =

International collegiate sorority

- ΚΚΓ
- Founded: October 13, 1870; 156 years ago Monmouth College
- Type: Social
- Affiliation: NPC
- Status: Active
- Scope: North America
- Motto: "Aspire to Be"
- Slogan: "Dream Boldly. Live Fully"
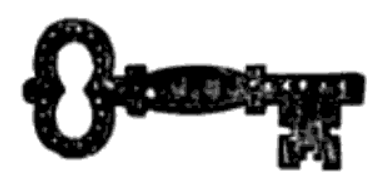
- Member badge
- Colors: Dark Blue Light Blue
- Symbol: Key
- Flower: Fleur-de-lis
- Jewel: Sapphire
- Mascot: Owl
- Patron Roman deity: Minerva
- Publication: The Key
- Philanthropy: Mental Health Awareness
- Chapters: 140
- Members: 260,000 lifetime
- Headquarters: 6640 Riverside Drive; Suite 200; Dublin, Ohio 43017; United States
- Website: kappa.org

Kappa Kappa Gamma (ΚΚΓ), also known simply as Kappa or KKG, is a collegiate sorority founded at Monmouth College in Monmouth, Illinois, United States. As of 2024, it has nearly 260,000 members and 140 collegiate chapters. It is sometimes referred to by its original designation, a women's fraternity, as it was founded before the term "sorority" was coined. Kappa Kappa Gamma is a founding member of the National Panhellenic Conference (NPC), an umbrella organization that includes 26 American sororities.

== History ==
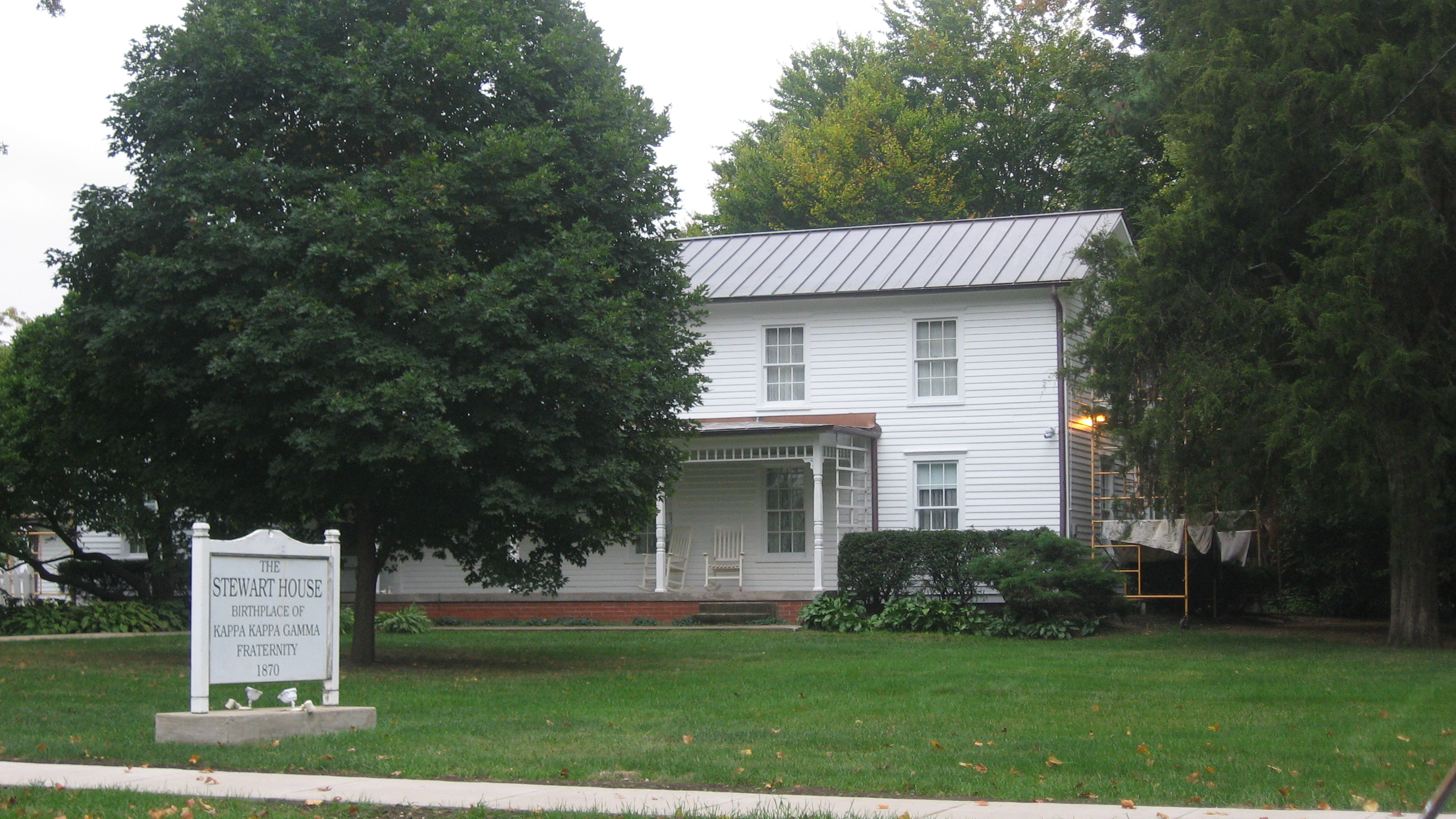
The Minnie Stewart House museum in Monmouth, Illinois, where the sorority was founded

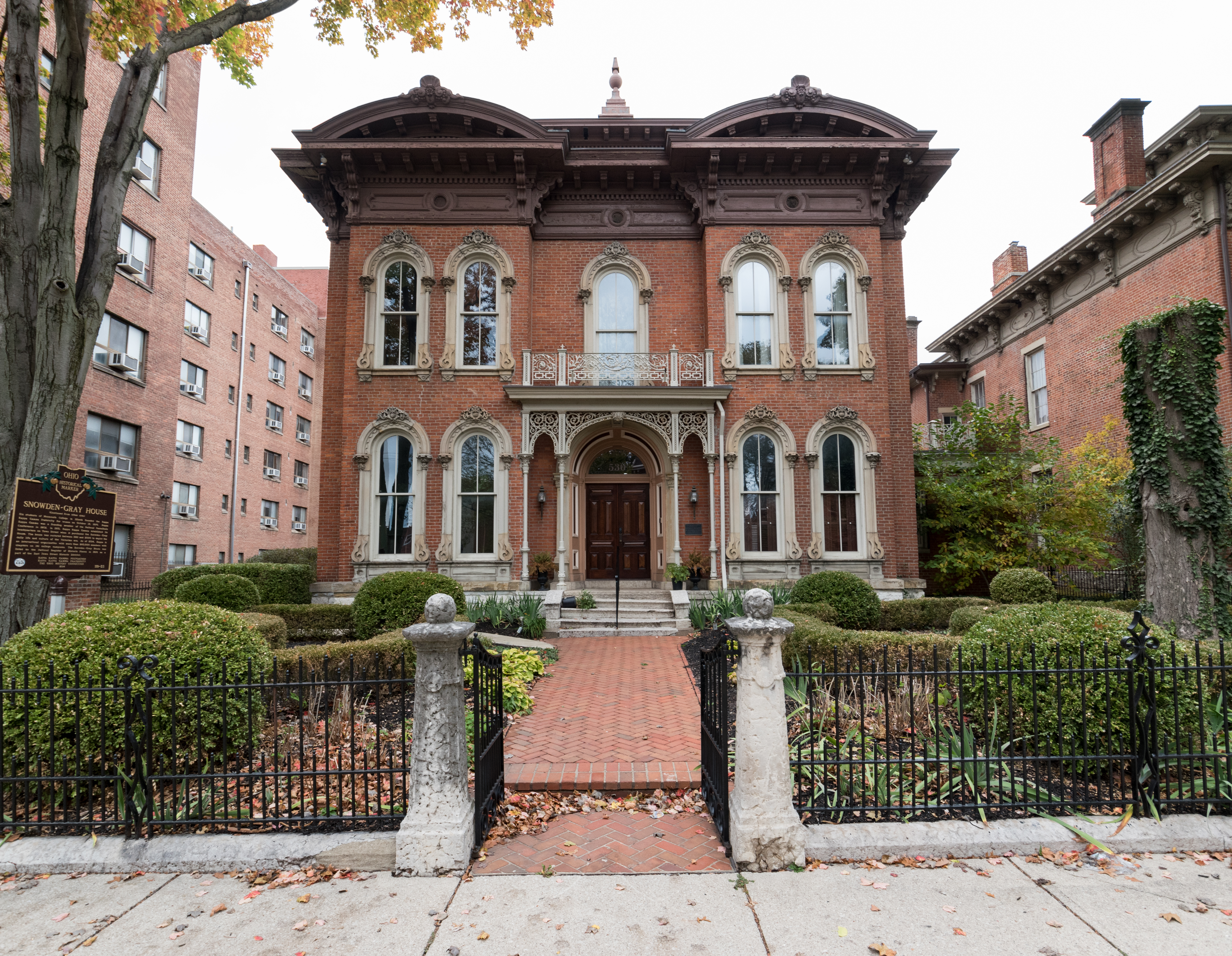
Kappa Kappa Gamma's headquarters from 1952 to 2018 at 530 E. Town Street in Columbus, Ohio

In 1869, two students at Monmouth College in Monmouth, Illinois, Mary Louise Bennett and Hannah Jeannette Boyd, were dissatisfied with the fact that, while men enjoyed membership in fraternities, women had few equivalent organizations for companionship, support, and advancement, and were instead limited to literary societies. Bennett and Boyd decided to create a women's fraternity and sought members "not only for literary work but also for social development," beginning with their friend Mary Moore Stewart. Stewart, Boyd, and Bennett met in the Amateurs des Belles Lettres Hall, a literary society of which the women were active members, to plan their new society. They recruited three additional women, Anna Elizabeth Willits, Martha Louisa Stevenson, and Susan Burley Walker, to join in founding the fraternity. It was called a women's fraternity because it was founded before the term "sorority" was coined.

The six founders met at Willit's home to begin work on establishing the Alpha chapter of Kappa Kappa Gamma. They chose a golden key as their badge and had badges crafted by Bennett's family jeweler for their official debut. A formal charter for the fraternity was drawn up by Stewart's father, who was an attorney in the state of Illinois. On October 13, 1870, the founders publicized their intention to organize as a women's fraternity by entering the Monmouth College Chapel, a public campus venue, wearing their golden key badges in their hair. Although the groundwork of the organization began as early as 1869, the 1876 Convention voted to recognize October 13, 1870 as the official Founders Day since no earlier charter date could be determined.

In 1871, the fraternity chartered its Beta chapter at nearby St. Mary's School in Knoxville, Illinois. The next year, the fraternity opened its Gamma chapter at Smithson College and Delta chapter at Indiana University. Though the Beta and Gamma chapters failed to survive more than a few years, the Delta chapter became the fraternity's oldest continuously active chapter (Alpha was temporarily closed in 1874 but later re-established) and contributed a great deal to the organization of the fraternity in its early years.

In 1882, Kappa Kappa Gamma was the first women's fraternity to publish The Key, a quarterly journal. Today, it is published triennially.

In 1890, the Beta Alpha chapter of Kappa Kappa Gamma became the first sorority at the University of Pennsylvania, an Ivy League university in Philadelphia, led by president Martha Bunting

=== National Panhellenic ===
In 1891, Kappa Kappa Gamma invited the other women's fraternities to Boston for a discussion on the challenges they collectively faced, which was the precursor to the National Panhellenic Conference. However, no major movements occurred from this meeting, and none would occur for another decade when Alpha Phi invited Pi Beta Phi, Kappa Alpha Theta, Kappa Kappa Gamma, Delta Gamma, Gamma Phi Beta, Delta Delta Delta, Alpha Chi Omega, and Chi Omega to a conference in Chicago on May 24, 1902, to set standards for collegiate sororities. This meeting resulted in the organization of the first inter-fraternity association and the first intergroup organization on college campuses. Today, it is known as the National Panhellenic Conference (NPC), an umbrella organization that includes 26 American sororities.

=== 20th century to present day ===
In 1907, Kappa Kappa Gamma had 600 active members and 4,700 lifetime initiates. It had 33 collegiate chapter and 31 alumnae associations. In the 1920s, eighteen chapters were chartered and one chapter was reestablished. The fraternity's most expansionary year was 1929, with six new chapters chartered.

From 1929 to 1952, the organization was headquartered in the Law and Finance Building in Downtown Columbus, Ohio. In 1952, Kappa Kappa Gamma purchased its first headquarters at 530 East Town Street, now part of the East Town Street Historic District. In the 1960s, G. William Domhoff, writing in Who Rules America?, listed Kappa Kappa Gamma as one of "the four or five sororities with nationwide prestige." In the 1980s, nineteen chapters were chartered.

On January 2, 2018, Kappa Kappa Gamma moved from the building to 6640 Riverside Drive in Dublin, Ohio.

== Symbols ==
The Key magazine, from 1915

The Kappa Kappa Gamma coat of arms combines all of the fraternity's symbols: the key, the Greek letters, the new-member pin, the fleur-de-lis, the owl, and the head of Minerva. Its motto is "Aspire to Be".

The Kappa Kappa Gamma member's badge is the golden key that is one inch in length and is sometimes jeweled with sapphires, pearls or diamonds. On the front of the key are the Greek letters "ΚΚΓ" on the stem and "ΑΩΟ" on the ward in enamel. The original keys were larger and were not standardized; many were specially made to the member's specifications, sometimes including stones such as opals. Its pledge pin is a which is a Sigma within a Delta enameled on silver in the two colors of the fraternity, dark blue and light blue.

Kappa Kappa Gamma's official colors are light blue and dark blue. The owl is its official mascot. The fraternity flower is the fleur-de-lis Since the fleur-de-lis is a mythical symbol, the iris is often substituted for practical purposes. The fraternity jewel is the blue sapphire. The sorority's nicknames are Kappa and KKG. Its magazine in The Key, first published in 1882.

== Chapters ==
Kappa Kappa Gamma has chartered a total of 161 chapters, thirty of which the fraternity have closed. Eight of the thirty closed chapters were rechartered. Active chapters exist in 41 of the fifty states and Washington, D.C. as well as in three of the ten Canadian provinces. The state with the largest number of active chapters is California, with seventeen active chapters and one inactive chapter.

== Philanthropy ==
Kappa Kappa Gamma's national philanthropy is mental health and well-being. The Kappa Kappa Gamma Foundation was founded in 1989 and provides funding for Kappa museums, member scholarships, educational and leadership programming, and financial aid to sisters in need.

== Monmouth Duo ==
The women's fraternity Pi Beta Phi was founded as I.C. Sorosis at Monmouth College in 1867. Kappa Kappa Gamma was founded at the college in 1870, and in 1888, I.C. Sorosis adopted Greek letters and changed its name to Pi Beta Phi. Because both fraternities have their origins at the same college within three years of one another, they are often called "The Monmouth Duo." On campuses with Pi Beta Phi and Kappa Kappa Gamma chapters, the groups often hold joint social and philanthropic events.

== Notable members ==
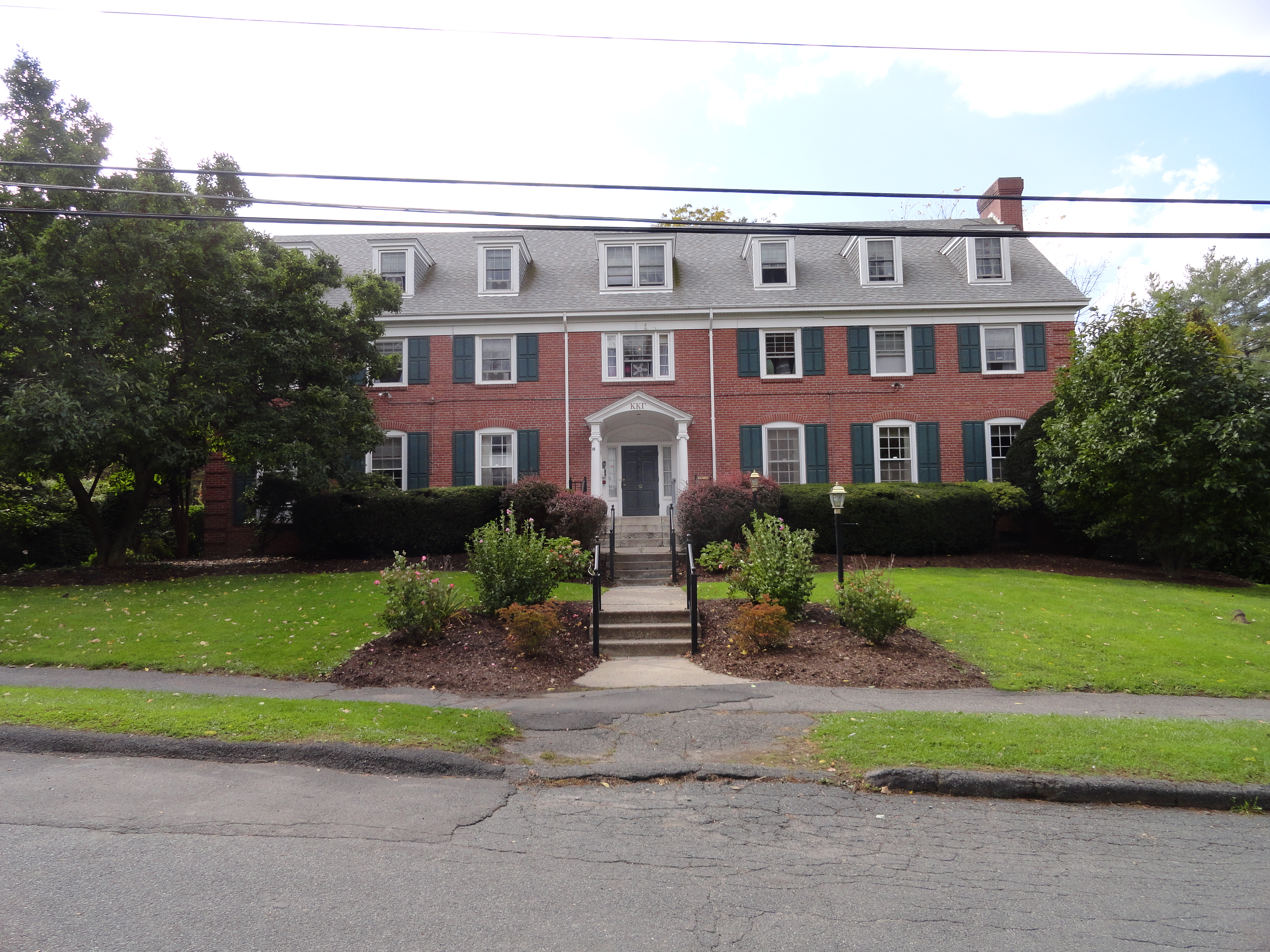
Kappa Kappa Gamma chapter house at University of Massachusetts Amherst (2011)

Kappa Kappa Gamma has a membership of more than 260,000 women, with 140 collegiate chapters in the United States and Canada and 307 alumni associations worldwide.

== Member misconduct and controversies ==
=== Racism ===
In 2018, the Kappa Kappa Gamma chapter at the University of New Mexico in Albuquerque was under fire for making racist comments during a Greek Life welcome event. The vice president of Black Brothers Cultivating Knowledge alleged that the sorority girls behind him said, "Black people, get away from me" and "Black people stop wearing grills" while a black woman was speaking.

In 2020, the Kappa Kappa Gamma chapter at the Indiana University Bloomington in Bloomington, Indiana was suspended partially due to the mistreatment of the only black member in the house.

=== University of Wyoming transgender lawsuit ===
In 2023, seven members at the University of Wyoming sued the sorority headquarters to remove a transgender woman, Artemis Langford, who they felt pressured to induct into the sorority. They say the induction violates the sorority bylaws, which state it is a "single-gender" organization. The lawsuit states sorority members allegedly noticed her become notably sexually aroused as other sorority members were changing shirts and staring inappropriately at members. She denied this, and text messages from sorority members submitted to the court supported her denial. The sorority headquarters states it “values diversity” and does not discriminate based on gender identity.

The Federal lawsuit was dismissed without prejudice on 25 August 2023, citing that "The University of Wyoming chapter voted to admit - and, more broadly, a sorority of hundreds of thousands approved - [the admission of a transgender individual, Artemis] Langford. With its inquiry beginning and ending there, the Court will not define ‘woman’ today. The delegate [~chapter] of a private, voluntary organization interpreted ‘woman,’ otherwise undefined in the nonprofit's bylaws; [hence,] this Judge may not invade Kappa Kappa Gamma's freedom of expressive association." This ruling effectively places any resolution back with the national and local organizations to resolve internally. In his decision, which used female pronouns, some of the sorority's arguments were called "plainly inaccurate" stating that any appeal should not be a "copy and paste" as its arguments were weak. The national sorority later expelled two long-serving alumnae volunteers who had used the sorority's member database to solicit donations to help pay for the Wyoming lawsuit.

In June 2025, the United States Department of Education issued a ruling prompted in part by the Westenbroek v. Kappa Kappa Gamma Fraternity case. It stated, "A sorority that admits male students is no longer a sorority by definition and thus loses the Title IX statutory exemption for a sorority’s single-sex membership practices."

=== Hazing ===
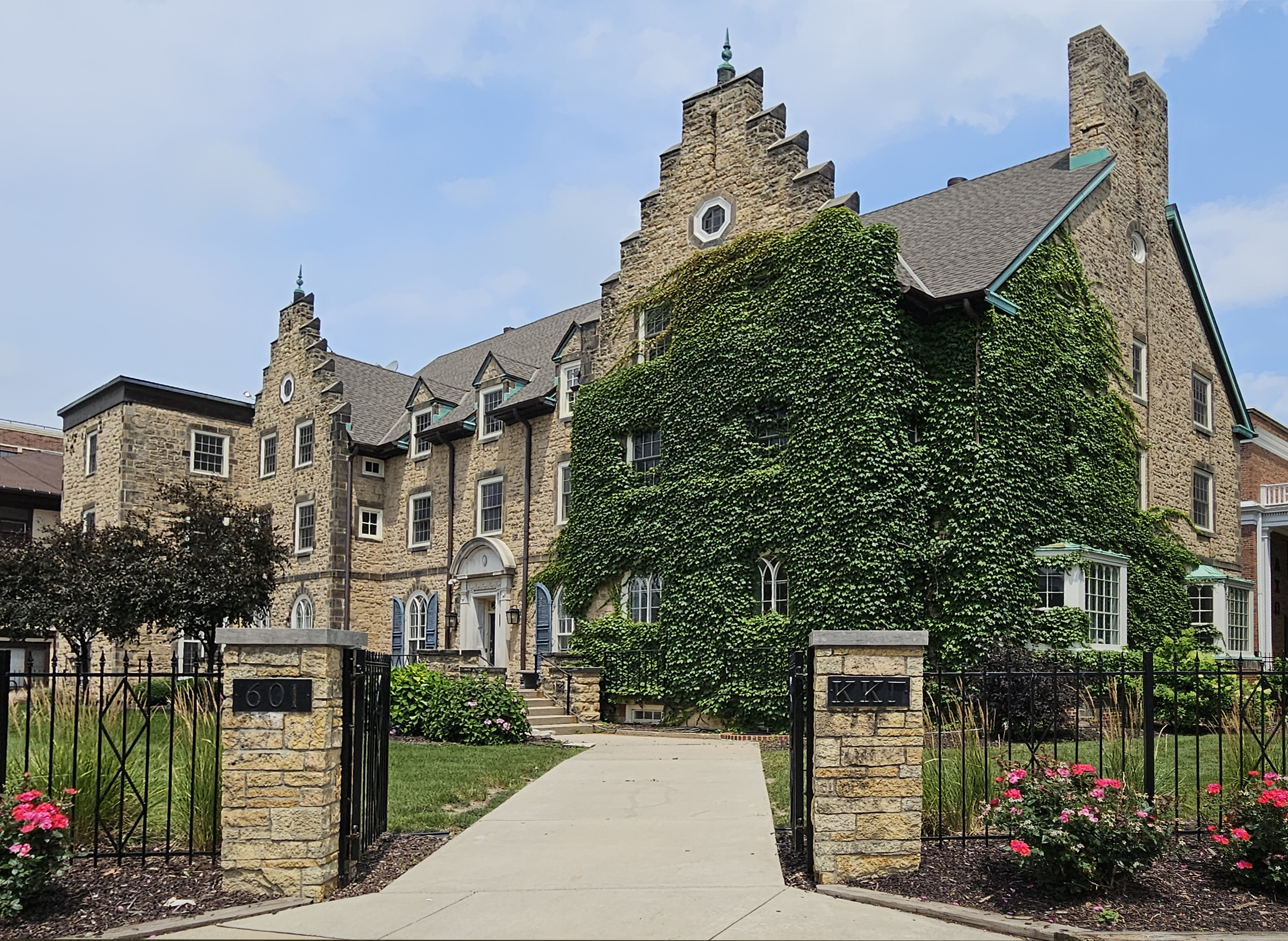
Kappa Kappa Gamma chapter house at University of Wisconsin Madison (2024)

In 1997, the television show 20/20 featured an exposé on hazing in the sorority system that included a hazing by three members of Kappa Kappa Gamma at DePauw University in Greencastle, Indiana, and a local sorority Lambda Delta Sigma at Concordia College in Saint Paul, Minnesota. The three members of Kappa Kappa Gamma, on November 6, 1997, were accused of branding three pledges with cigarettes in a family hazing rite after a night of heavy drinking. After being burned, the pledges were encouraged to streak across campus and grovel for cigarettes at a fraternity house. The result was severe enough to send one of the pledges to the hospital with minor burn injuries. The disclosure of the incident caused investigations by the sorority and campus to be launched. The members who were involved in the incident were not charged by the state of Indiana with criminal recklessness under the hazing statute, as had been reported. They did, however, face a possible trial for alcohol possession, but due to difficulty proving who provided the alcohol, the members were given community service instead. DePauw's reaction to the hazing for the chapter was to put the chapter on social probation until Fall 1999 and cut its pledge class in half for two years. The thirteen members who had either been involved with the incident or had known about it were given one-semester suspensions and social probation for their participation and were voted by their chapter to retain membership within the chapter.

In 2014, the Kappa Kappa Gamma chapter at the main campus of the University of Connecticut in Storrs, Connecticut was forced to stop its operations for forcing pledges to "drink until they passed out, act like animals, and wiggle on the floor like 'sizzling bacon.'" The chapter was not reinstated until 2017, under a probationary review.

In 2015, the Kappa Kappa Gamma chapter at Ohio State University in Columbus, Ohio was suspended for initiation rituals that involved heavy consumption of alcohol.

In 2020, the Kappa Kappa Gamma chapter at Indiana University Bloomington in Bloomington, Indiana was suspended for hazing and misconduct. One pledge reported to authorities she and about 50 other pledges were escorted to a basement, where senior members of the sorority were clad in lingerie, intimidating them and pranking them, thinking they had to perform oral sex on fraternity members or do a line of cocaine. One senior member of the sorority allegedly stated, "They (pledges) were lucky they didn't have to do anything worse as pledges for a top-tier sorority."

=== Bruce Ivins ===
Bruce Ivins, the senior bio-defense researcher at United States Army Medical Research Institute of Infectious Diseases (USAMRIID), before allegedly being driven to suicide by allegations that he was the "sole perpetrator of the 2001 anthrax attacks", reportedly had a "long and strange obsession" with Kappa Kappa Gamma, as well as with other sororities such as Chi Omega. Ivins reportedly became obsessed with Kappa when he was rebuffed by a woman in the sorority during his days as a student at the University of Cincinnati. The letters containing anthrax spores (which eventually killed 5 people and injured dozens more) were mailed from a drop box approximately 300 feet from a KKG storage facility at Princeton University, and only 60 feet from the KKG office. A US Government investigative panel, called the Expert Behavioral Analysis Panel, issued a report in March 2011 which detailed more of Ivins' obsession with the sorority. According to the panel's report, Ivins tormented sorority member Nancy Haigwood at the University of North Carolina. Ivins stole her notebook, which documented her research for her doctoral studies, and vandalized her residence.

== See also ==
- List of social sororities and women's fraternities
