= Martha Bunting =

American biologist and teacher

Martha Bunting (2 December 1861 – 13 October 1944) was an American biologist and teacher.

== Biography ==
Bunting became the first president of the Beta Alpha chapter of the national Kappa Kappa Gamma sorority at the University of Pennsylvania, the first sorority at the university in March 1890.
