= Lazarus House =

Historic house in Columbus, Ohio

- Frederick Lazarus House
- U.S. Historic district – Contributing property
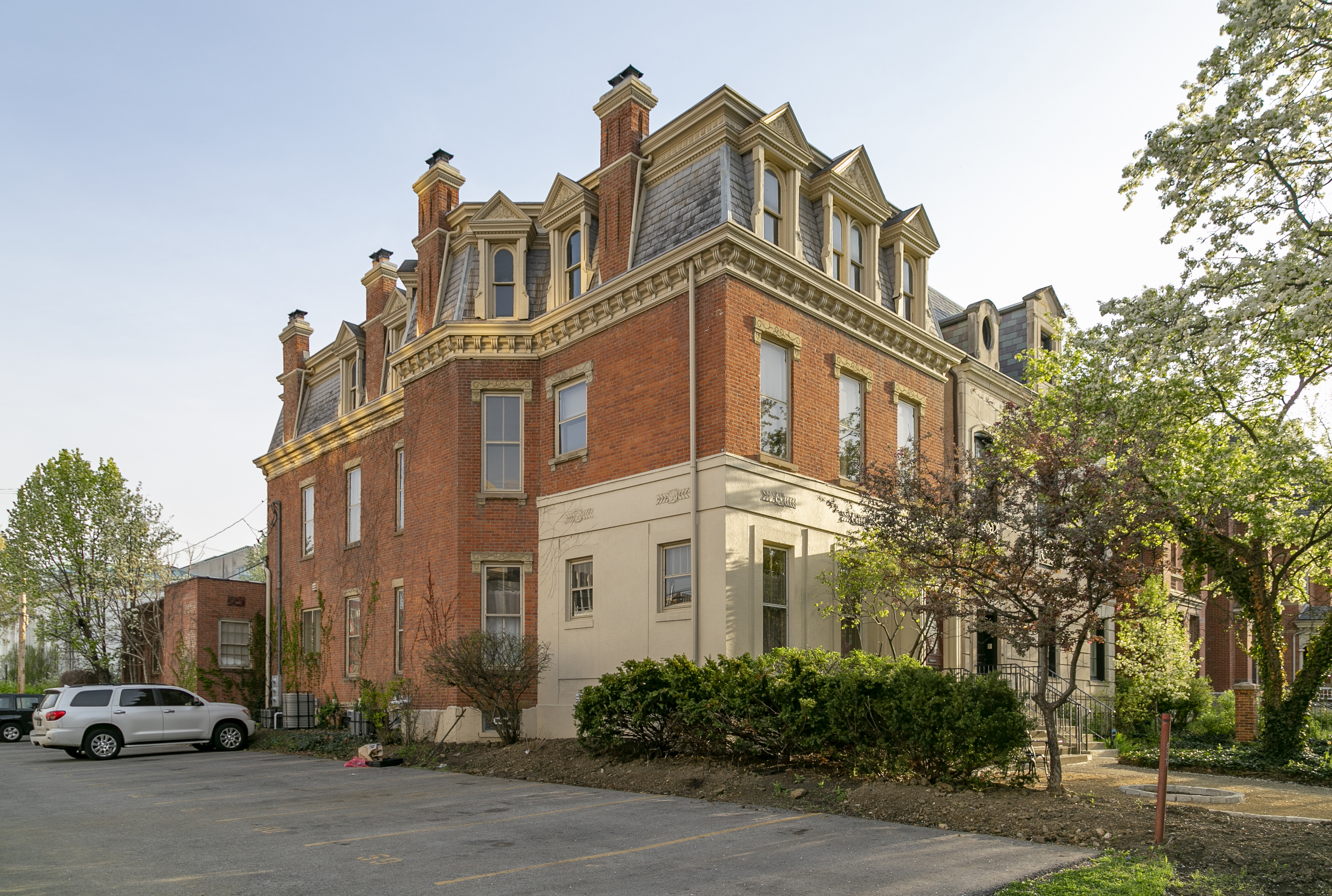
- Interactive map of Frederick Lazarus House
- Location: 380 E. Town Street, Columbus, Ohio
- Coordinates: 39°57′37″N 82°59′23″W
- Built: 1886
- Architectural style: Second Empire
- Part of: East Town Street Historic District (ID76001425)

The Lazarus House is a historic house in Downtown Columbus, Ohio. It was built in 1886 for Frederick Lazarus Sr., president of the F&R Lazarus & Company, and was designed in the French Second Empire style. It has undergone numerous renovations since its construction, including for conversion into office space, into apartments, and back to predominantly single-family occupancy. The house is a contributing property of the East Town Street Historic District, on the National Register of Historic Places and Columbus Register of Historic Properties.

== Attributes ==
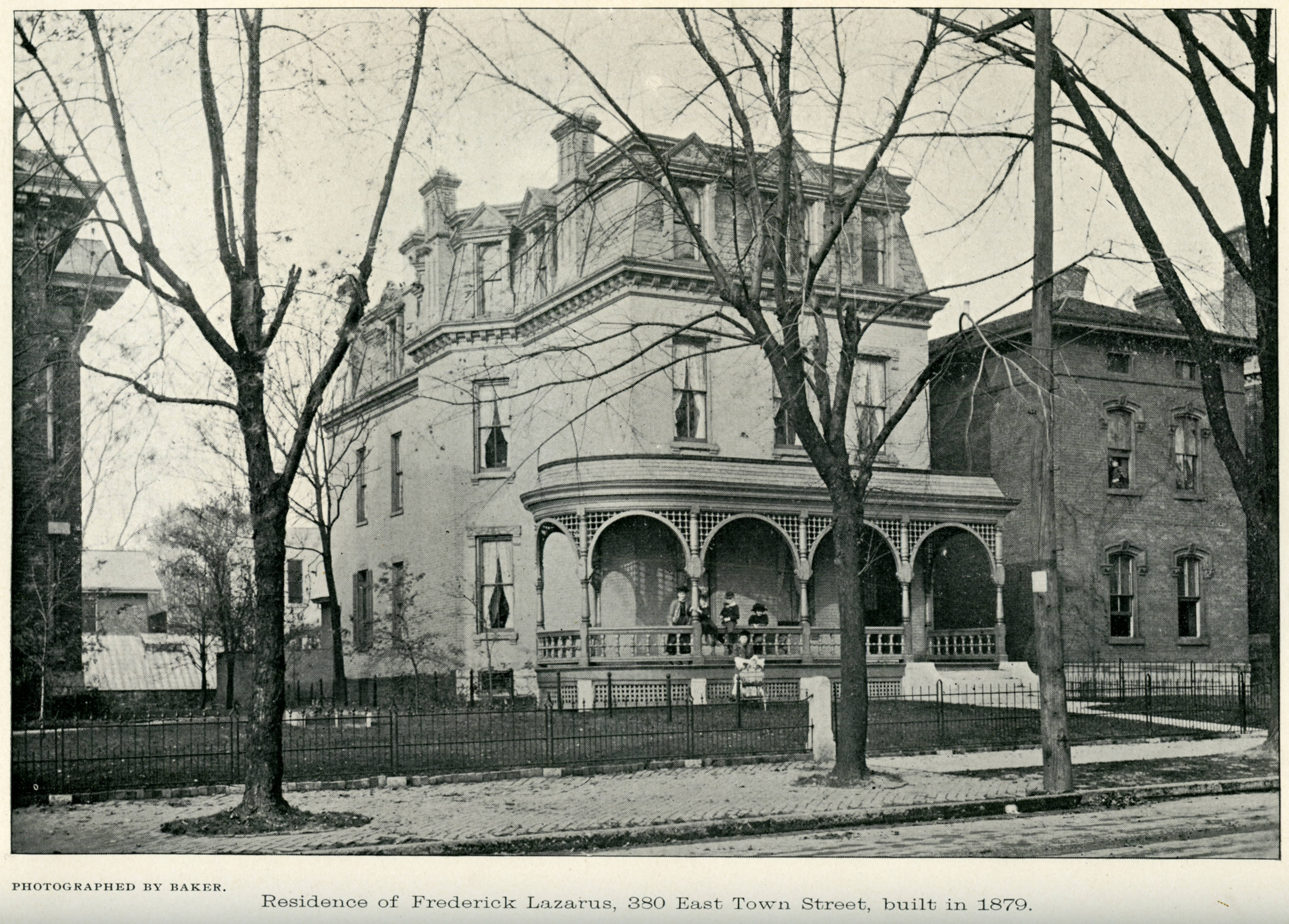
The house in 1892

The Lazarus House serves as an example for townhouses in the East Town Street Historic District, on the National Register of Historic Places. It was added to the district when created in 1976, and to the district under the Columbus Register of Historic Properties in 1982. Its mansard roof, gable dormers, and heavy metal cornice exemplify the Second Empire style. It has about 7,000 sq ft (650 m^{2}), including an addition at the back of the house dating to the 1940s.

== History ==
The house was built in 1886 for Frederick Lazarus Sr., president of the F&R Lazarus & Company and son of company founder Simon Lazarus. The Lazarus family moved in about 1906 to a new and larger house at Bryden Road and S. Ohio Avenue; that house was demolished in 1924.

By 1976, the house held the office of a medical doctor, Henry B. Lacey. By 1979 Lacey had sold it to one of his students, Thomas Mallory, who used it for the offices of Joint Implant Surgeons Inc. and continued restoring the property. Beginning in 1982, it was renovated for office rental use by the Bernstein Group.

In 2013–2014, following concerns the house might be demolished, local restorationists Jeff Darbee and Nancy Recchie led a renovation funded by federal and state historic tax credits. The project restored many of the original features of the house, including the grand staircase and geometric wood flooring, and created three luxury apartments, and restoring many original features, including a grand staircase and geometric wood flooring. The house was listed for sale at $890,000 in 2020; the buyers began further restoration as a private residence with the help of a tax abatement.
