= East Town Street Historic District =

Historic district in Ohio, United States

- U.S. National Register of Historic Places
- U.S. Historic district
- Columbus Register of Historic Properties
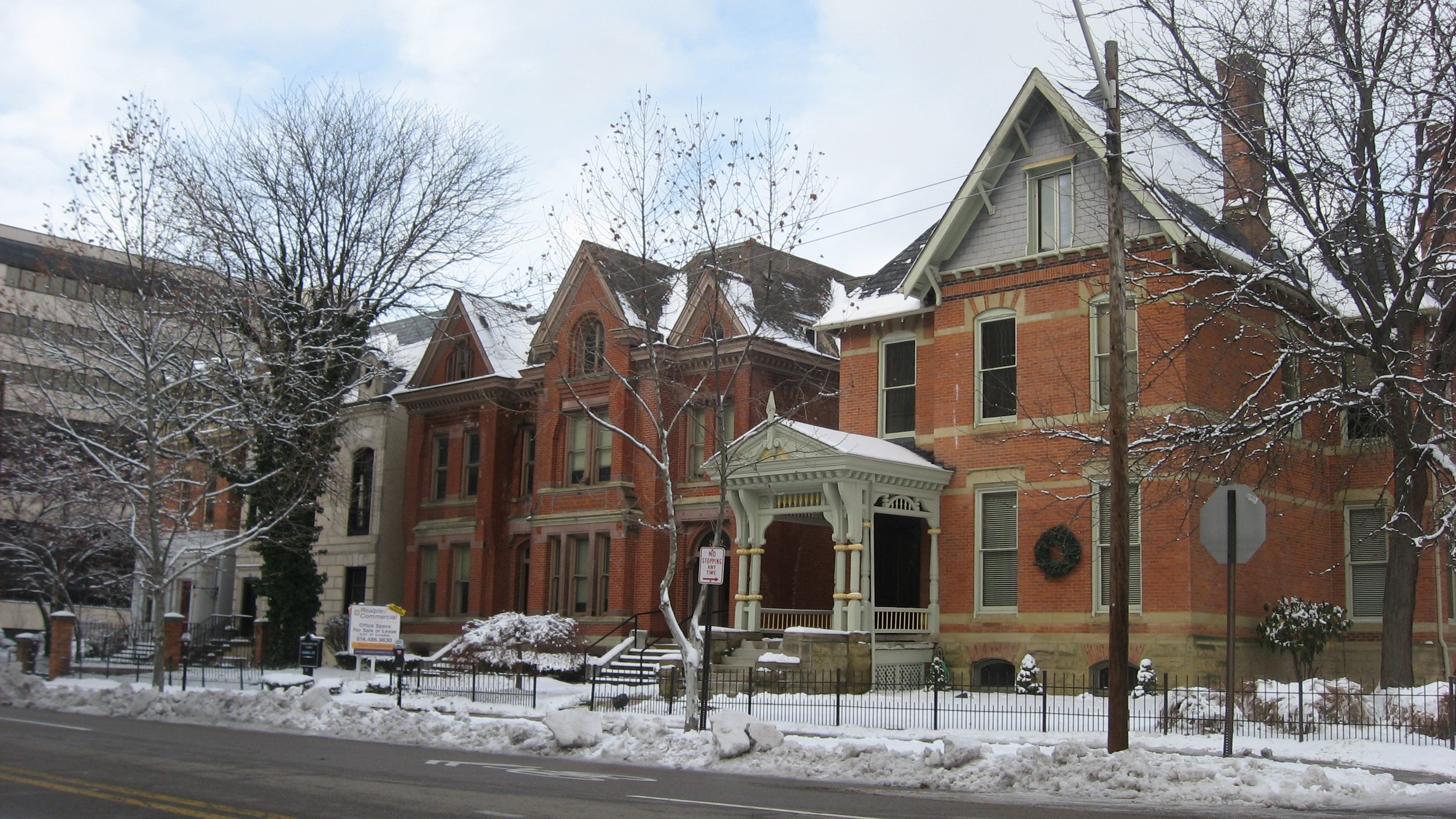
- Contributing buildings
- Interactive map of the district's CRHP boundaries among other CRHP sites
- Location: Columbus, Ohio
- Coordinates: 39.96001°N 82.98666°W
- NRHP reference No.: 76001425
- CRHP No.: CR-11

Significant dates
- Added to NRHP: July 30, 1976
- Designated CRHP: October 4, 1982

The East Town Street Historic District is a historic district in Downtown Columbus, Ohio. The site was listed on the National Register of Historic Places in 1976 and the Columbus Register of Historic Properties in 1982; the district boundaries differ between the two entries.

The Snowden-Gray House, a High Victorian-style two-and-a-half-story mansion with a cupola, built in 1852, is salient in the district. It was the Kappa Kappa Gamma National Headquarters from 1952 to 2018. It housed the Heritage Museum, displaying the history of the organization. The building now serves as an event space.

The Kelton House Museum and Garden is a historic house museum in the district.

== Gallery ==
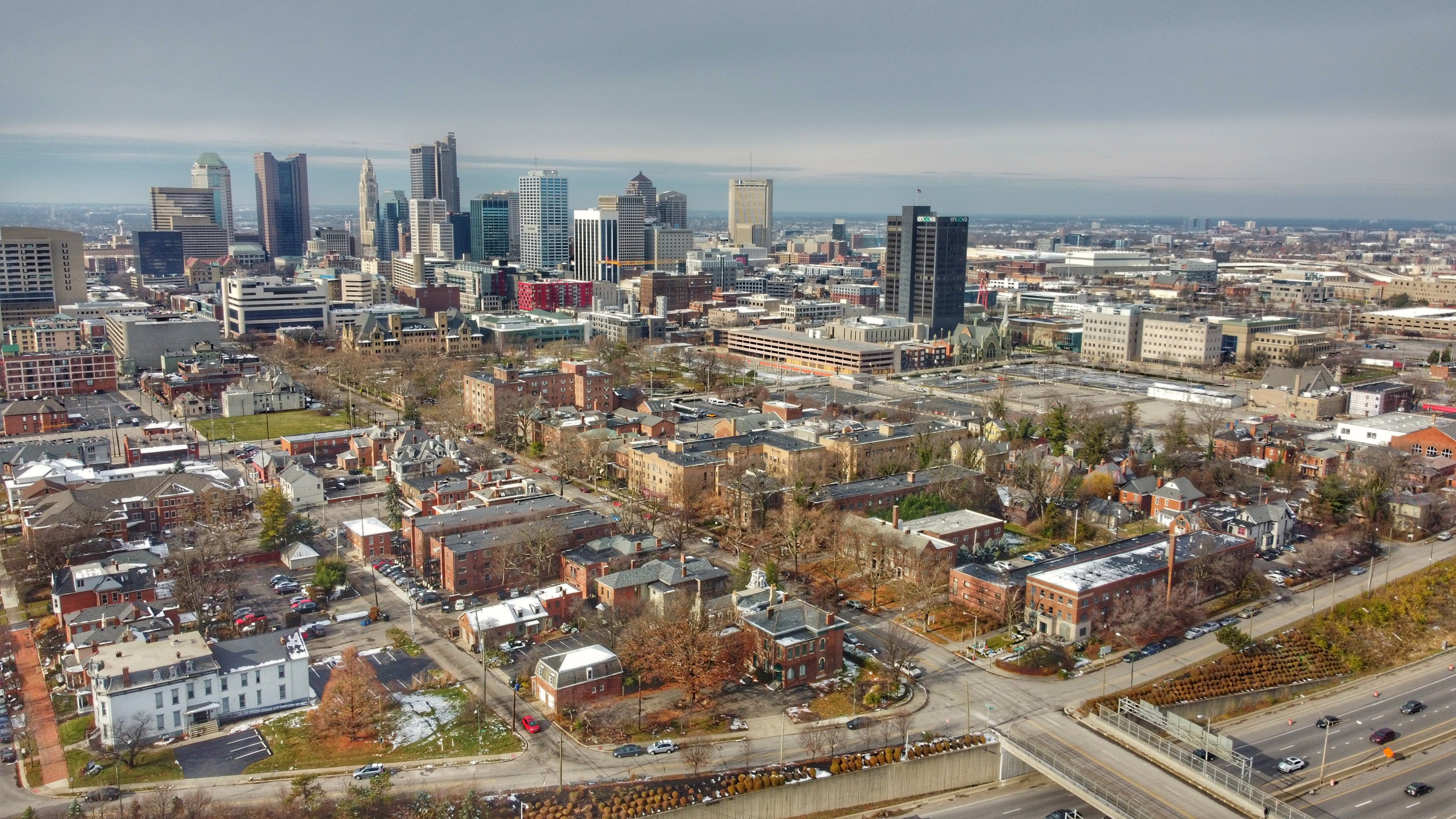
Aerial view of the district

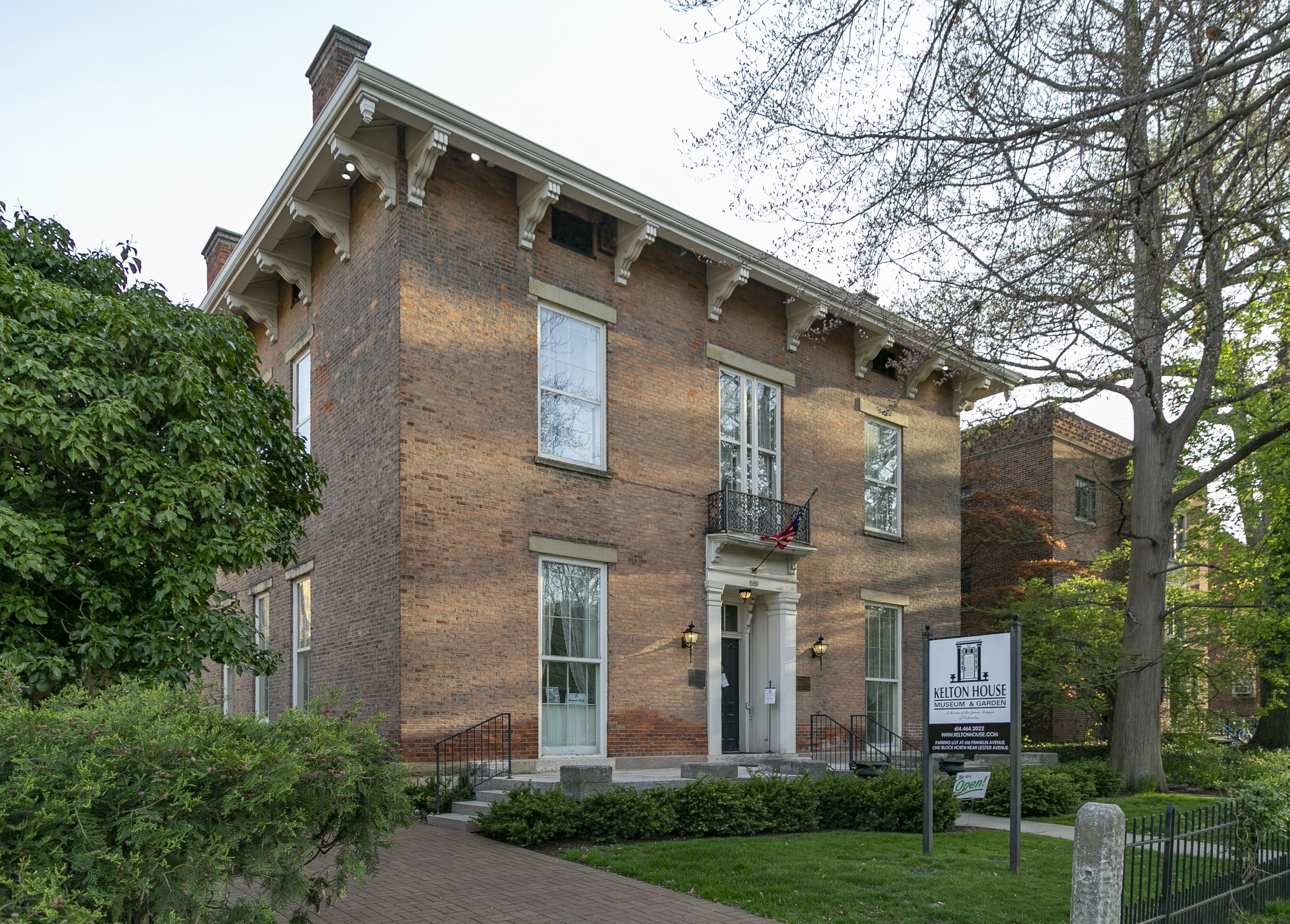
The Kelton House

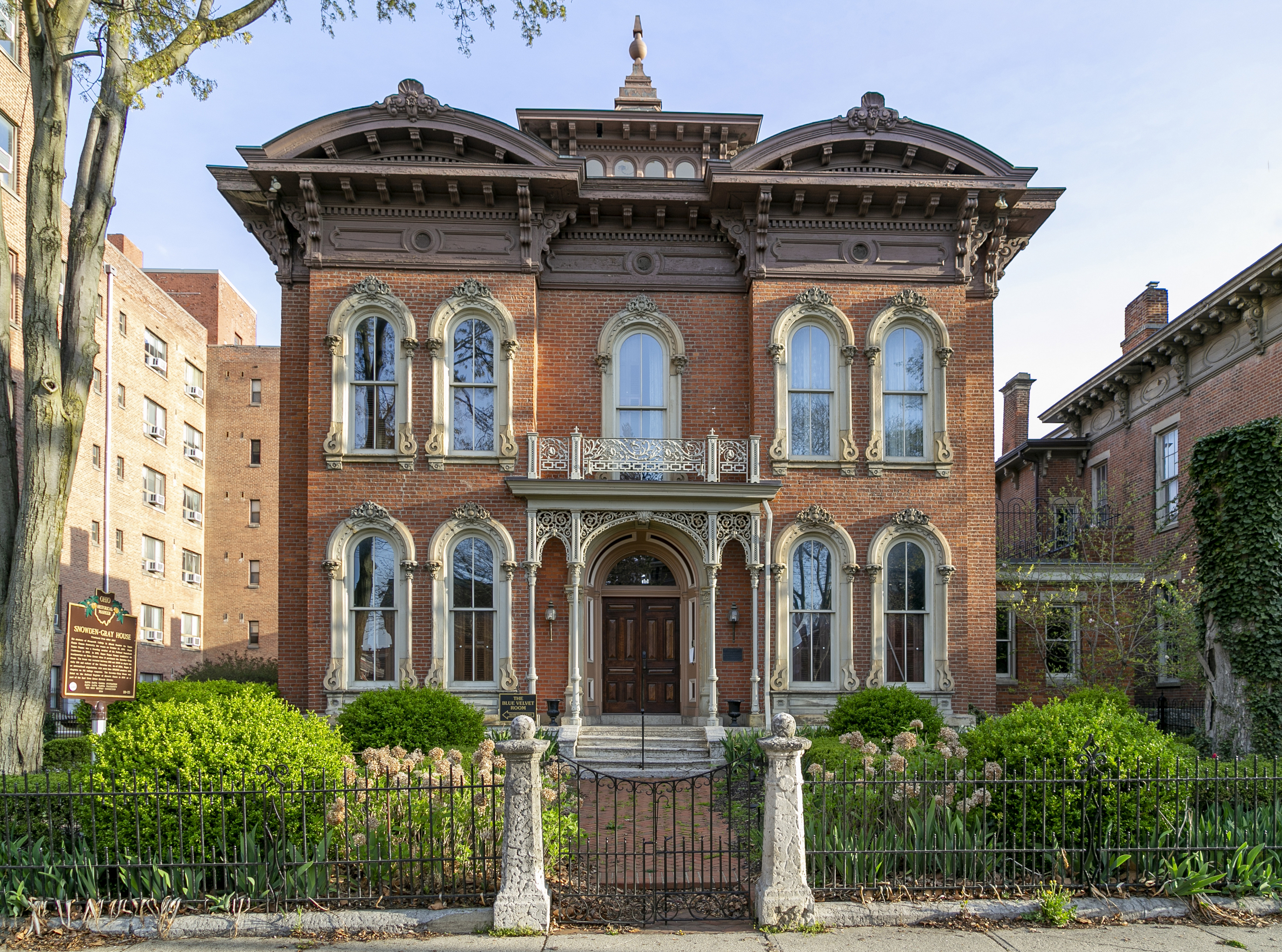
The Snowden-Gray House

=== Houses on the 300 block ===
370 East Town Street contributing house, demolished

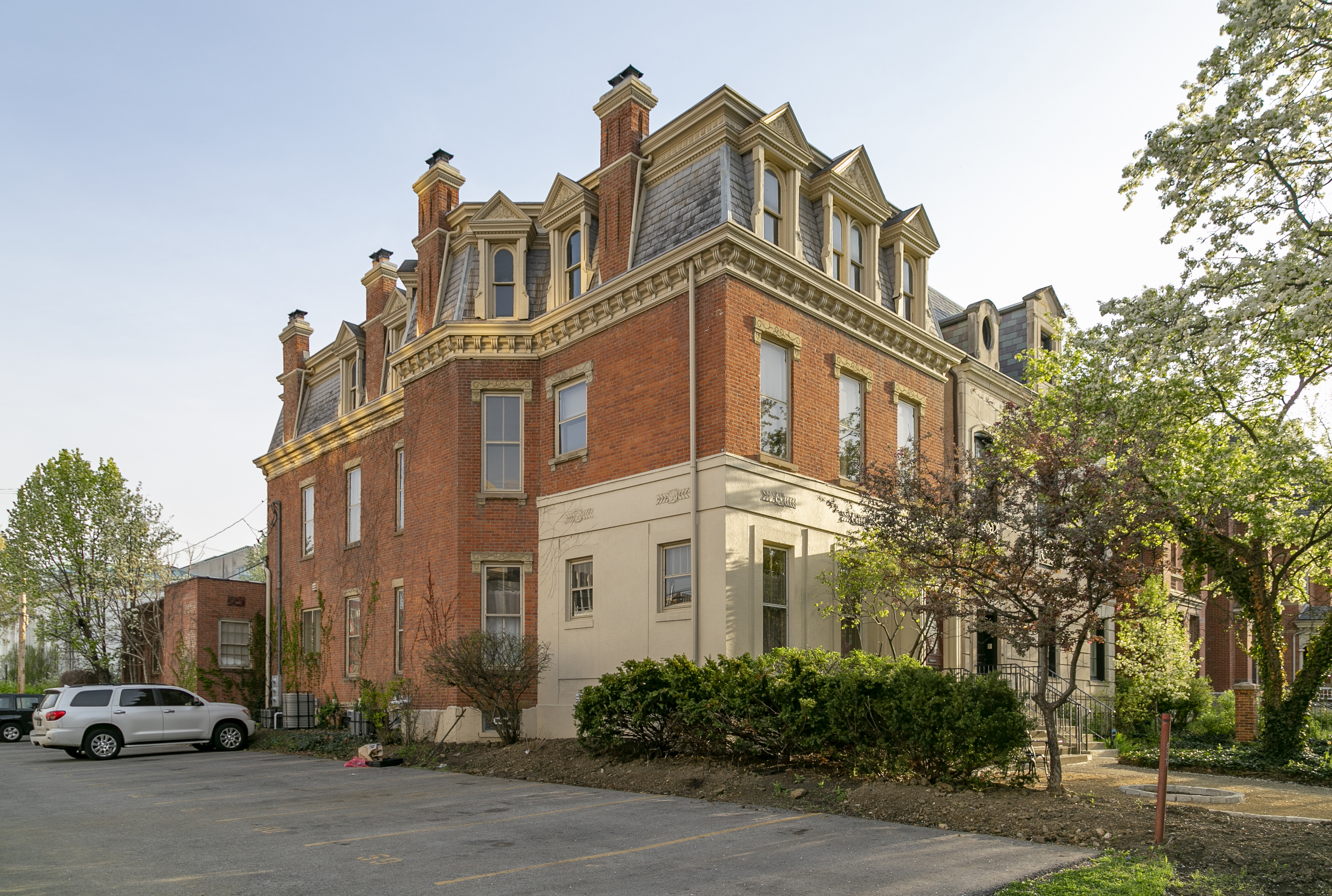
380 East Town Street
(Fred Lazarus House)

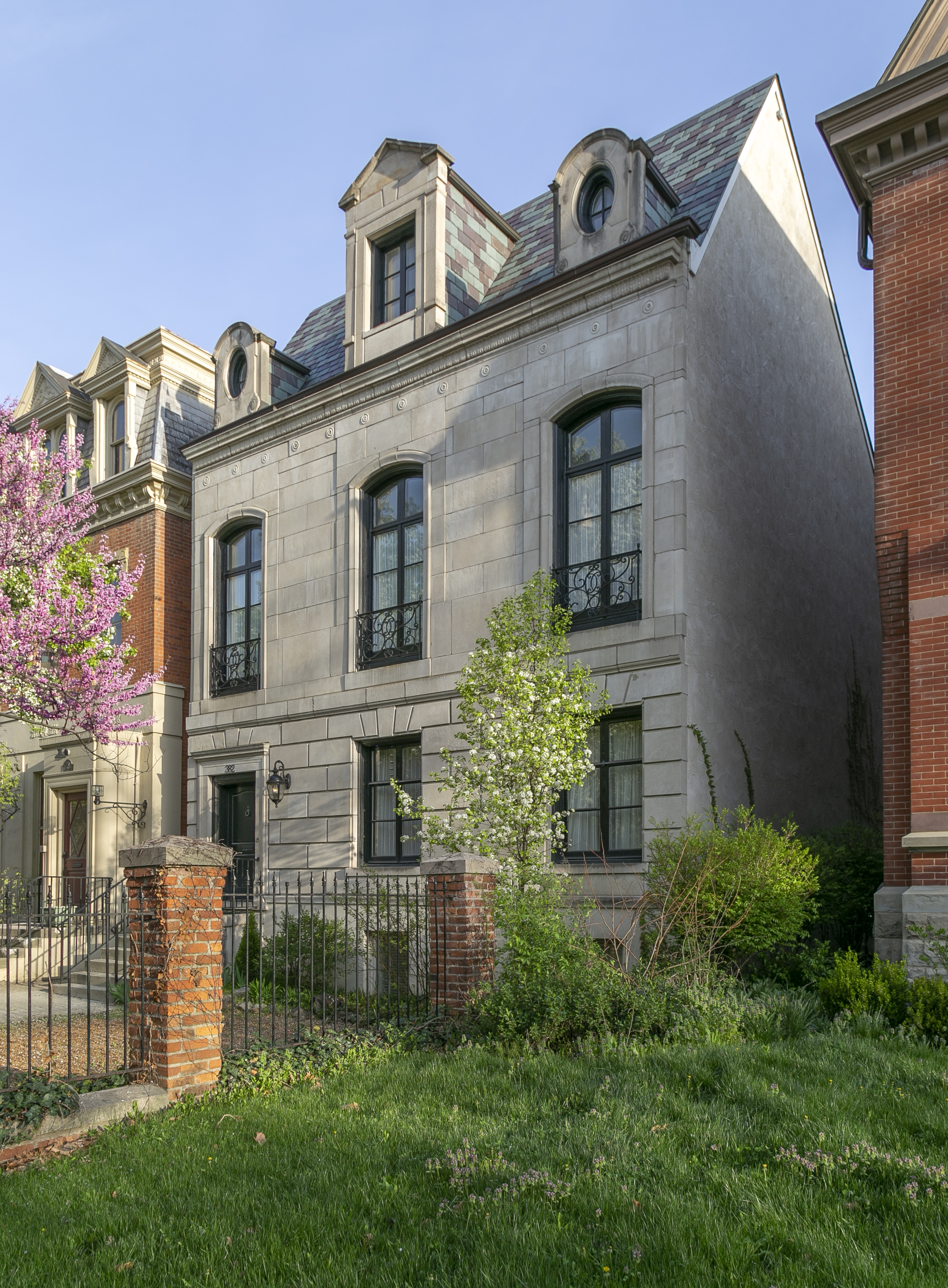
385 East Town Street

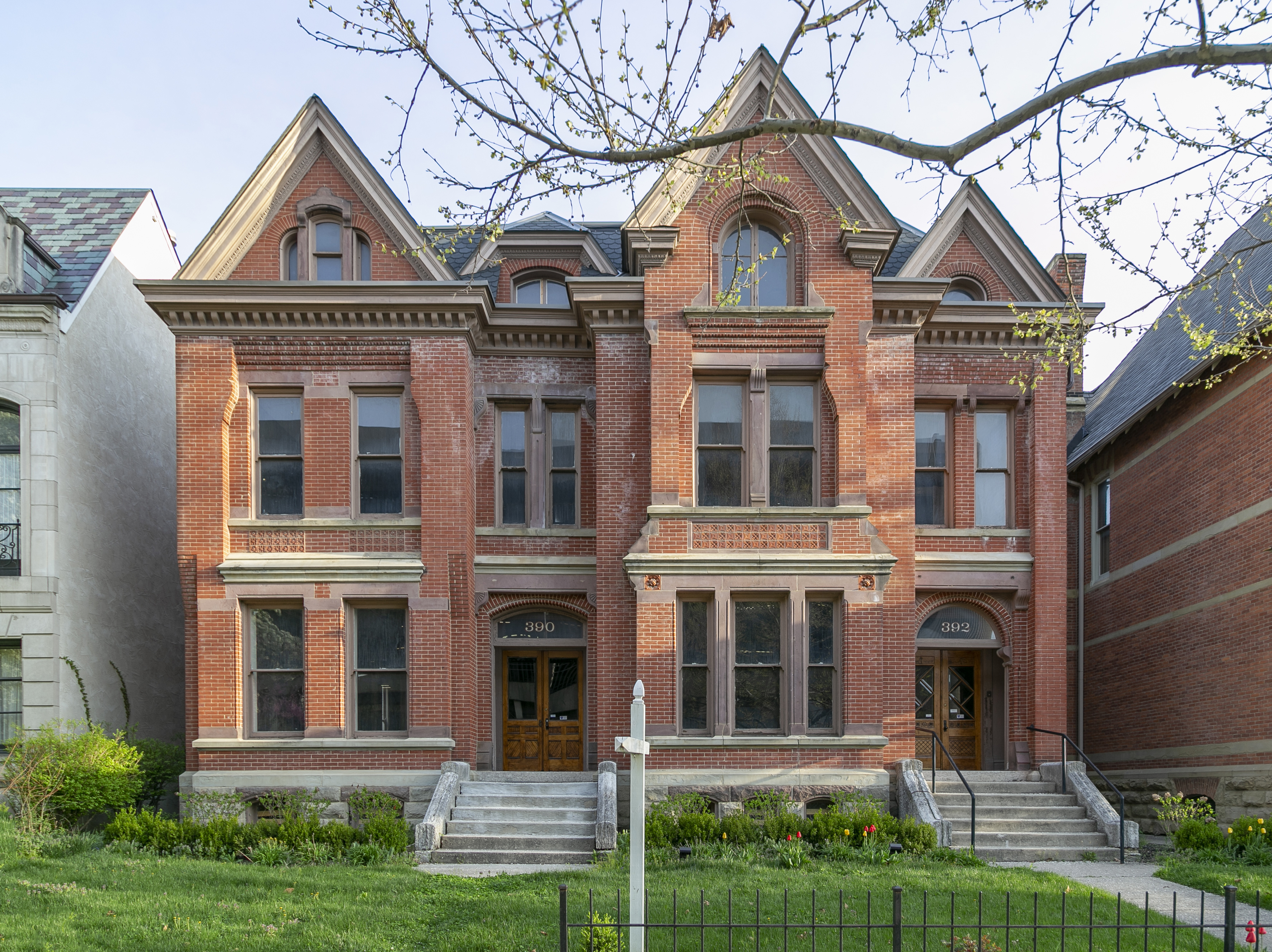
390-392 East Town Street (Amelia & Ralph Lazarus House)

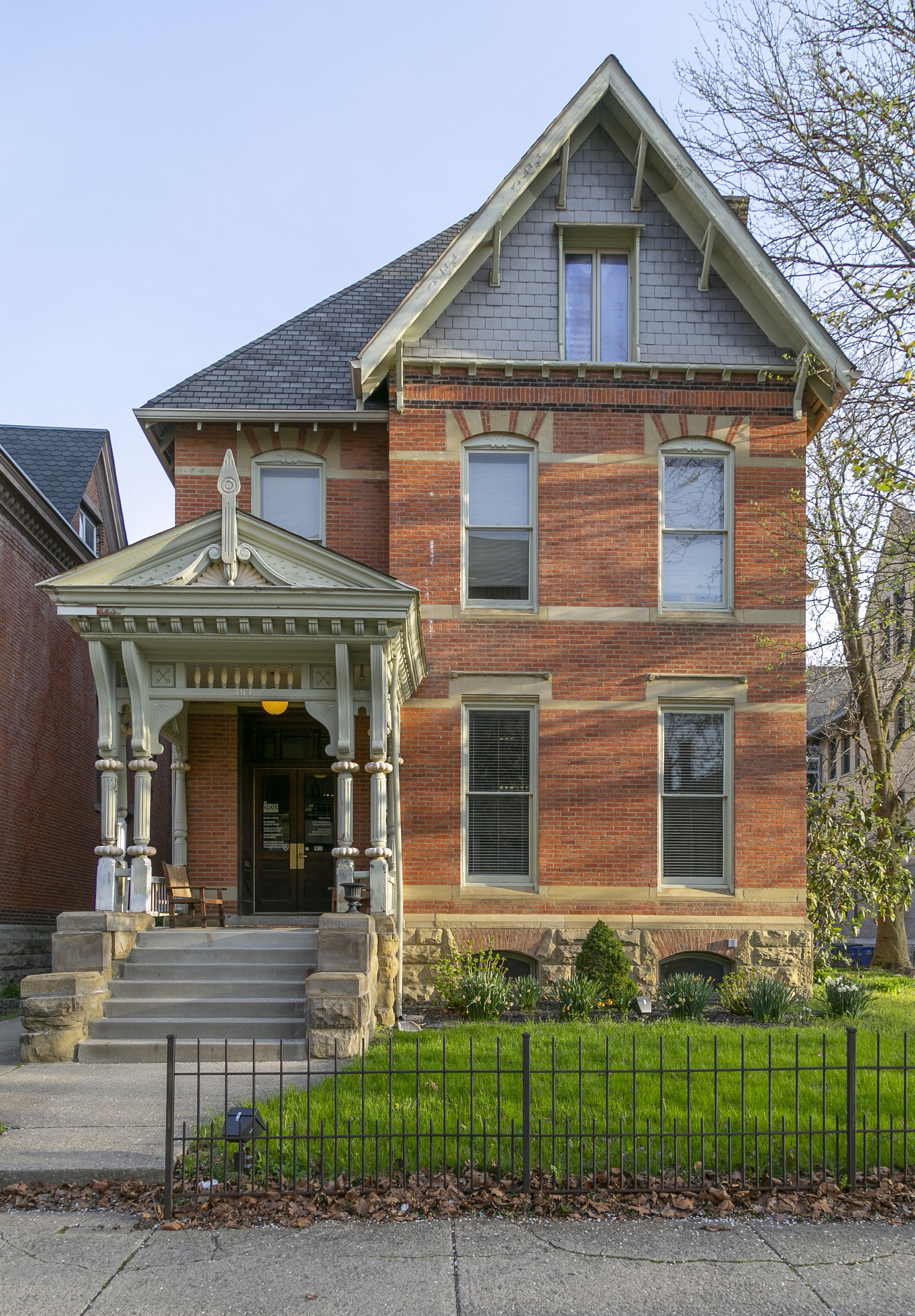
394 East Town Street (McManigal House)

== See also ==
- Cristo Rey Columbus High School
- National Register of Historic Places listings in Columbus, Ohio
- Ohio Institution for the Deaf and Dumb
- Topiary Park
