= Law and Finance Building =

Office building in Columbus, Ohio

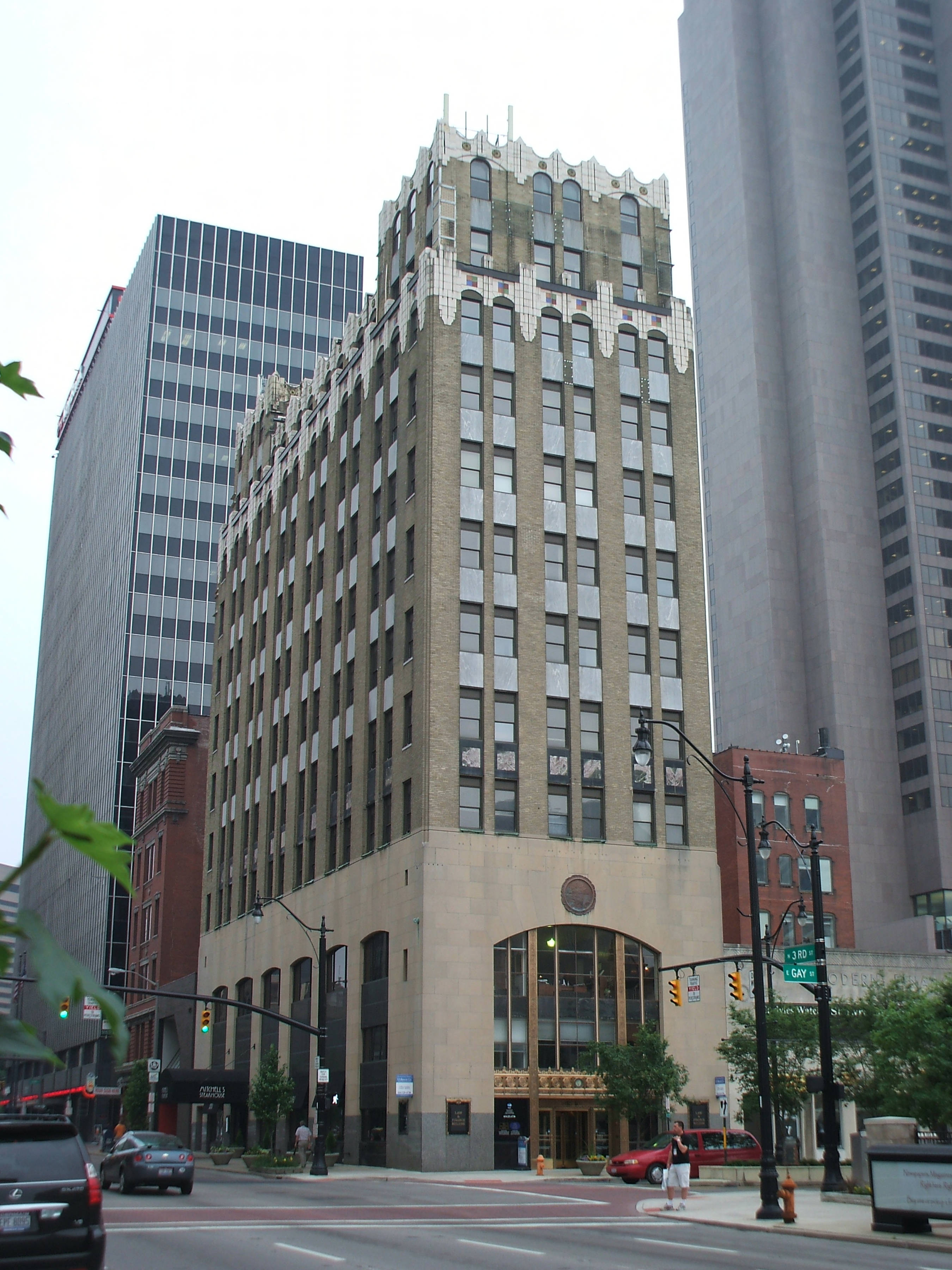
- Alternative names: Ohio State Savings Building, Ohio State Federal Building

General information
- Architectural style: Art Moderne
- Location: 85 E. Gay Street, Columbus, Ohio
- Coordinates: 39.96363°N 82.99842°W
- Completed: 1927

Height
- Height: 149.5 ft (45.6 m)

Technical details
- Floor count: 13

Design and construction
- Architects: Simons, Brittain & English

The Law and Finance Building is a historic building in Downtown Columbus, Ohio. The building was built in 1927 for the Ohio State Savings Association, a local bank. It was designed in the Art Moderne style by architects Simons, Brittain & English. For a short time, the building held the offices of its architects, and was the central office of sorority Kappa Kappa Gamma from 1929 to 1952. The building now holds office space, and has a steakhouse on the original banking lobby floor.

== Attributes and history ==
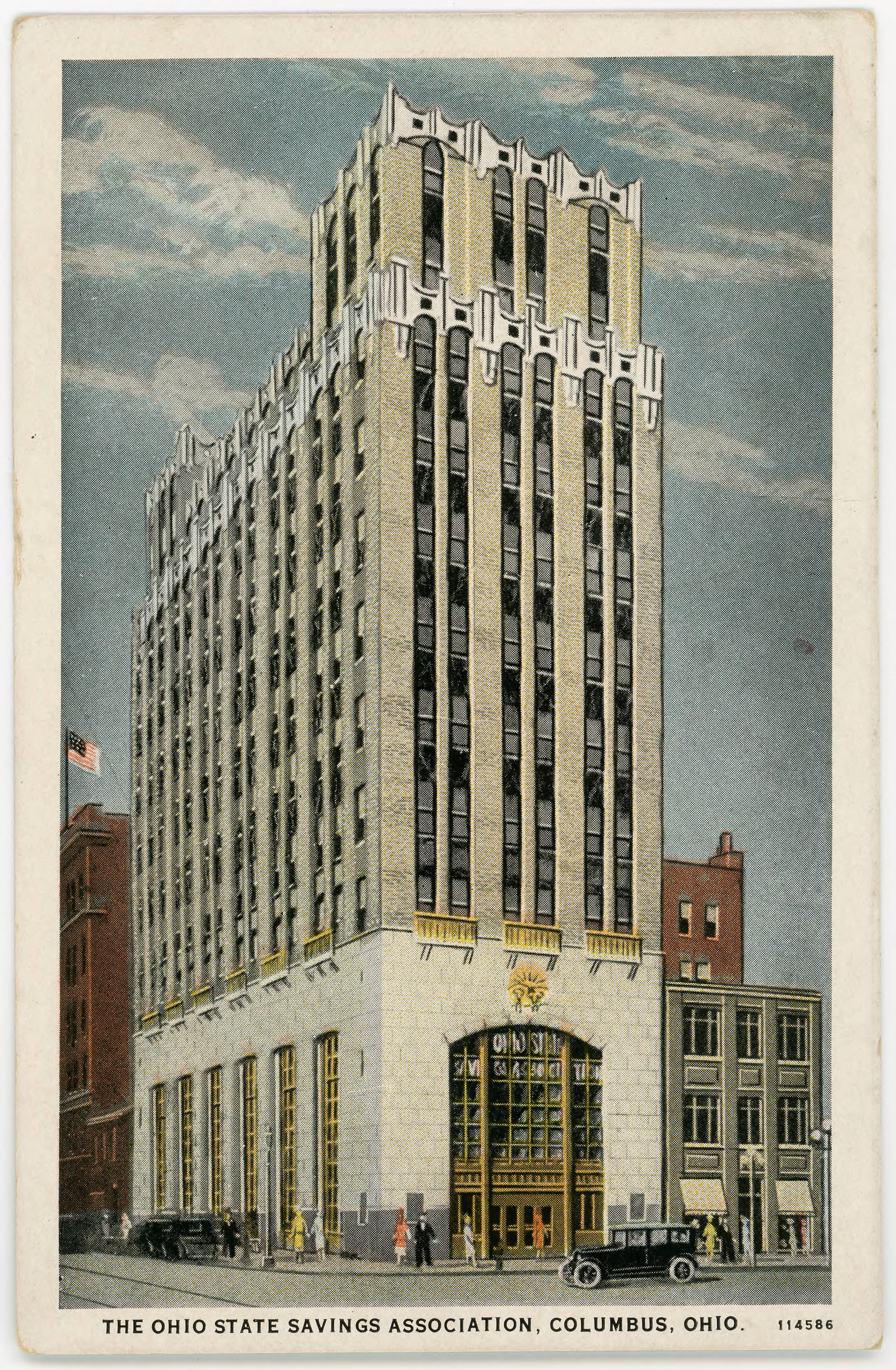
Early view

The Ohio State Savings Association commissioned the building around 1926. At the time of the building's construction, Gay Street was becoming a popular location for banks.

It was designed in the Art Moderne style by Simons, Brittain & English. The building was completed in 1927, the same year and in the same style as the LeVeque Tower. The steel-frame building utilizes several building materials, including Litholite (a cast stone material) on the exterior of its first three floors, brick on the upper seven floors, and above an ornamental parapet made of multicolored terracotta. Two-story penthouses above it have similar ornamentation. The main entrance on Gay Street uses a warm mix of pale pink marble and polished brass, and includes an elevator lobby and decorative open stairway. It was built as one of several prominent banks in downtown Columbus. The building received extensive architectural press coverage due to its use of Litholite, a new building material at the time. It was operated by the Ohio State Savings Association, which claimed it had the heaviest bank vault door in the city.

From 1928 to 1929, the building housed the Columbus office of its architect firm, Simons, Brittain & English. The building is only one of two bank and office towers by the firm still known to be standing, and the only one in the Art Moderne/Deco styles. The other still standing is the City Savings Bank & Trust Company building in Alliance, Ohio.

From 1929 to 1952, the building was the headquarters to Kappa Kappa Gamma, a sorority in the U.S. and Canada. It was the organization's first official office; its prior space was in the private home of its executive secretary. The organization later moved to a historic house on Town Street, becoming the first sorority to own their own headquarters.

Since 1998, the building's original banking lobby has housed a steakhouse restaurant, part of the Cameron Mitchell restaurant group. The restaurant interior maintains the original high ceilings with decorative plaster. The interior has intricate decorations, though it added numerous contemporary decorations as well.

== See also ==
- List of Art Deco architecture in the United States
