= Lambda Delta Sigma (Concordia) =

Sorority at Concordia College in Minnesota, US

- ΛΔΣ
- Founded: 1919; 107 years ago Concordia College (Moorhead, Minnesota)
- Type: Social
- Affiliation: Independent
- Status: Active
- Scope: Local
- Motto: "Enter to Learn, Depart to Serve"
- Colors: Navy blue, White, and Hot pink
- Symbol: Pink Flamingo
- Flower: American Beauty rose or the red rose
- Jewel: Pearl
- Publication: LDS Newsletter
- Philanthropy: YWCA of Fargo
- Chapters: 1
- Headquarters: 901 8th Street S. Moorhead, Minnesota 56562; United States
- Website: lambdadeltasigma.wordpress.com

Lambda Delta Sigma (ΛΔΣ) is the only remaining Greek society at Concordia College. Founded in 1919 as a literary society, the ladies of Lambda Delta Sigma have since shifted to a philanthropic organization with their main charity being the YWCA of Fargo. The society operates under their original motto: "Enter to Learn, Depart to Serve".

== Literary societies at Concordia ==
Lambda Delta Sigma was formed as a literary society for women at Concordia College in 1919.

The original purpose of literary societies at Concordia was to “acquire skill at forensics- debating, speaking and parliamentary procedure”. In Concordia's early years, being a part of a literary society tied into students’ English grades with points deducted for failure to attend meetings. In fact, students received one eighth of a college credit for participating in these literary societies until 1927. Even after students stopped receiving grade increases for participating in literary societies, students involved in these organizations prioritized academics. In 1937, the members of the Lambda Delta Sigma society earned the highest GPA out of all the organizations at the college, including other literary societies and extra-curricular clubs. The members of the society received an average GPA of 1.932 points out of the possible 2, as compared to the average campus GPA of 1.56.

Members of women's literary societies at Concordia College presented original one-act plays at their annual open houses and competed against one another. These plays were written and directed by the members of the societies and faculty members screened the scripts before their debut.

A majority of colleges had literary societies, and a large majority of them transitioned into sororities and fraternities as time progressed. In 1929, an intersociety council formed to govern over the eight local societies operating on campus. This council governed the activities of the organizations and their rules for recruiting new members. The aim of the intersociety council was to promote cooperation amongst the literary societies and to maintain a good relationship with the campus. A member from each of the eight societies was elected yearly to serve on this council.

In 1924, 90 percent of female upperclassmen were involved in women's literary societies and 95 percent of male upperclassmen were involved in men's literary societies. Students were urged to join societies in order to adapt to college life and learn how to cooperate with others. In 1932, there were 255 students at Concordia College involved in societies; this was more than half of the students enrolled at the college. Of the female undergraduates, 60% were members of a society.

== LDS as a local sorority ==
Following national trends, in the 1940s the societies on campus that had formed as literary societies began to shift over to more social purposes and began to referring to themselves as fraternities and sororities. Two of the eight societies removed the word "literary" from their names in 1938 to address their new purpose as social Greek letter organizations. They still kept some of their literary roots by such activities as performing short plays at social events. Societies on campus participated in homecoming festivities, held joint activities with their brother and sister societies, and hosted banquets and parties for their members.

Lambda Delta Sigma, also referred to as LDS, likewise adjusted its focus to become a philanthropy (service) based, independent sorority. The Concordia College chapter of LDS is the only such group on campus. It is not affiliated with the National Panhellenic Conference as are the majority of national sororities. During the 1960s and 1970s, membership was on an upswing for LDS, and in 1979, the society had 55 active members. But towards the end of the 1990s, the number of new members had substantially dropped. In 1996, only four new members were initiated into LDS. In subsequent years, membership has stabilized.

== Symbols ==
The official colors of the Lambda Delta Sigma sorority are navy blue and white, the sorority has unofficially adopted hot pink as one of their colors as well. The original colors of the society were scarlet and white. The flower of the society is the American Beauty rose or the red rose. The symbol of the sorority is the pink flamingo. The jewel of the society is the pearl. The motto of the society is the same as it was in 1919: "Enter to Learn, Depart to Serve".

== Involvement ==
=== LDS and AES ===
LDS held banquets regularly with the help of their brother society, AES. These banquets all had unique themes and handmade invitations created by the LDS girls, complete with a schedule of events and menu. At these banquets, the members would also put on short plays that matched the theme of the event. They had a few luncheons throughout the year and one formal banquet at the end of the year. Because of AES's high involvement in campus athletic activities, the joint events of the brother-sister society pairing were arranged around the college's athletic schedule.

In the early years of the societies, Lambda Delta Sigma and Alpha Epsilon Sigma held joint recruitment events for freshmen students interested in joining a literary society. LDS had a society room on campus and this served as the location where the two societies hosted open houses with skits, talks from faculty advisors, and songs. Recruitment events were hosted in the Spring semester of the school year and were followed by a pledge period to the society. Freshmen students were eligible to pledge one of the societies if they had earned a minimum of 12 honor points during the Fall semester. Not all freshmen students were accepted to societies due to maximum quotas of new members.

=== LDS involvement in campus activities ===
Besides holding socials with their brother society, Lambda Delta Sigma participated in events with the other Greek societies on Concordia's campus until the other societies were disbanded due to non-adherence to the college's policies. Lambda Delta Sigma used to put on campus-wide parties and events along with other campus Greek societies before CEC [Campus Entertainment Commission] was in existence. The societies also participated in a Winter Carnival that boasted activities such as snow sculpting contests. Included in the Winter Carnival was a winter Olympics in which the Greek societies would compete against each other in various winter sporting events. The Winter Carnival was an extremely popular event on campus and while it was hosted by the Student Association, the Greek societies did a lot of the managing of events.

=== LDS in the Fargo-Moorhead community ===
As other Greek societies on campus began to disband, Lambda Delta Sigma sought other Greek societies to socialize with. In turn, forging a relationship with the Greek societies of North Dakota State University and Minnesota State University Moorhead.

In 2002, LDS began electing a ‘ladies man’ from a NDSU or MSUM fraternity to act as a liaison between the sorority and the surrounding Greek communities. Having this fraternity member helped the society stay connected even though they are the only Greek society left at Concordia. Another way that the society maintains connections is by having one mandatory monthly social between the members of LDS and another Greek society, either at NDSU or MSUM.

Being involved with these other societies helped LDS come up with new ideas for their own philanthropy projects. In 2006, LDS held their first ever Mr. Concordia pageant after seeing the Mr. NDSU pageant. The Mr. Concordia pageant connects LDS to the Concordia campus by picking a representative from campus organizations to participate in the fundraising. The first pageant held benefited the Muscular Dystrophy Association but has shifted over the years to benefit the society's main charity, the YWCA. In 2020, LDS renamed the pageant to Mx. Concordia to be more all male presenting contestants.

Another one of the society's ongoing philanthropy projects is a pop-tab collection drive for the Ronald McDonald House. LDS goes head to head with a fraternity at NDSU to see who can collect the most pop-tabs; the society that collects the lesser amount has to cook dinner for the other society. The society holds one mandatory philanthropy event for its members each month. Some of the philanthropy events they participate in include volunteering at nursing homes, helping out at the YWCA and volunteering at a food bank.

While Greek societies have lost the major role they once played on the Concordia campus, Lambda Delta Sigma maintains their society status as the only Greek organization in existence at Concordia. The society maintains their original motto of “Enter to Learn, Depart to Serve” and this can be seen through the lasting service they have done for the Fargo-Moorhead area.

== See also ==
- Fraternities and Sororities
