= Kelton House Museum and Garden =

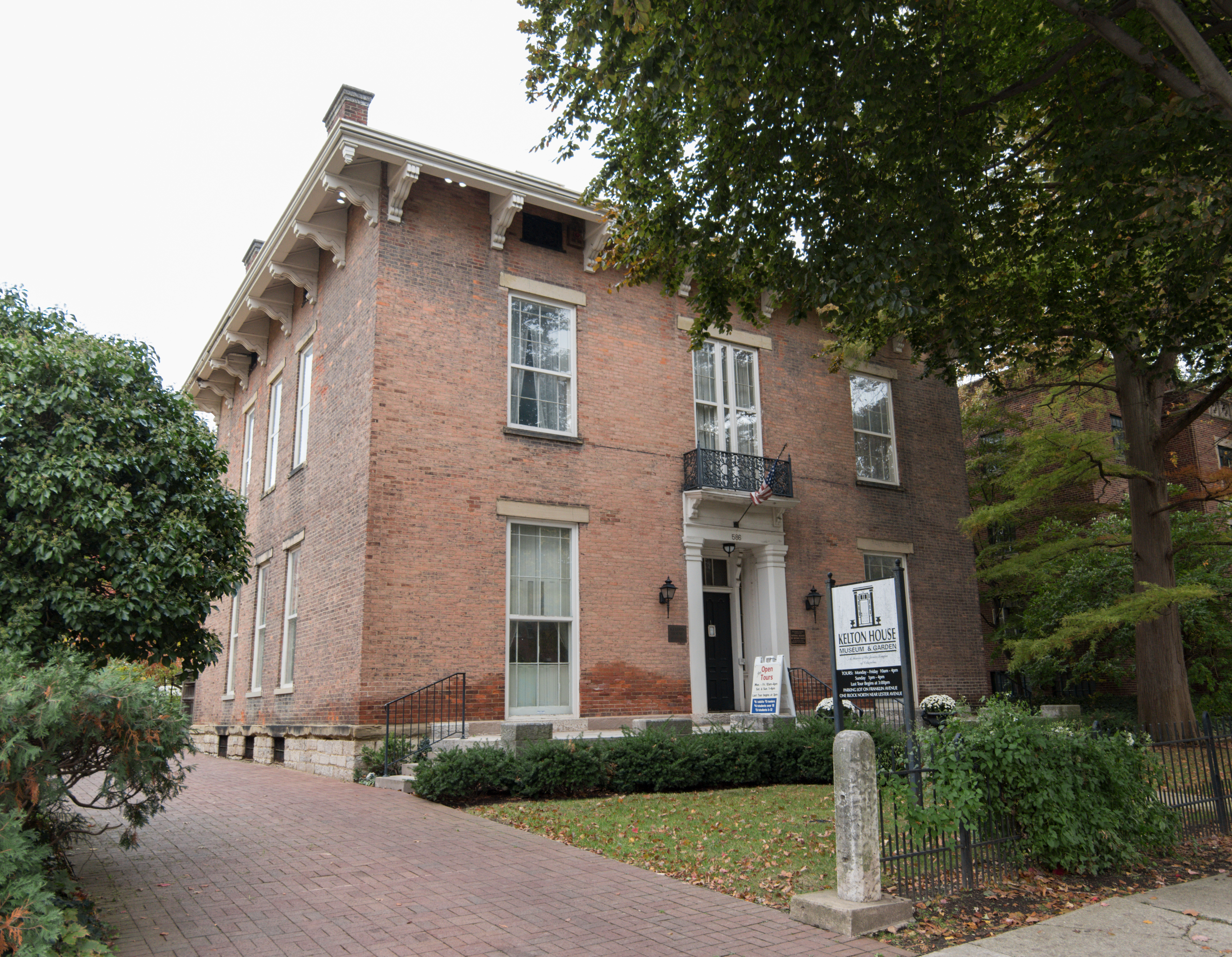
- Location: 586 East Town Street, Columbus, Ohio
- Coordinates: 39°57′39″N 82°59′04″W
- Type: Historic house museum
- Public transit access: 11; CoGo
- Website: keltonhouse.com
- Fernandez Cortez Kelton House
- U.S. Historic district – Contributing property
- Columbus Register of Historic Properties
- Built: 1852
- Part of: East Town Street Historic District (ID76001425)

Significant dates
- Added to NRHP: November 8, 1979
- Designated CRHP: October 4, 1982

The Kelton House Museum and Garden is a Greek Revival and Italianate mansion in the Discovery District of Downtown Columbus, Ohio. The museum was established by the Junior League of Columbus to promote an understanding of daily life, customs, and decorative arts in 19th-century Columbus and to educate visitors about the Underground Railroad.

== Overview ==
Fernando Cortez Kelton was a merchant from Vermont who rose to prominence in Columbus as a drygoods wholesaler. He and his wife, Sophia Langdon Stone Kelton, built the Kelton House on Town Street in 1852. The Keltons were fervent abolitionists who used their home as a stop on the Underground Railroad. Fernando Kelton was so respected for his abolitionist work that he was selected to be a pallbearer at the funeral procession of Abraham Lincoln when Lincoln's remains were brought to Columbus on their way to Illinois for burial. The Keltons' eldest son Oscar joined the 95th Ohio Infantry, Company A in 1862 to fight against slavery. He rose to the rank of first lieutenant before getting killed in the Battle of Brice's Crossroads on June 10, 1864. The same year, the Keltons took in Martha Hartway, a young runaway slave from Virginia. She was raised as part of the family until her marriage in 1874 to Thomas Lawrence, a carpenter whose work can still be seen in the Kelton House.

The house passed on to the Kelton's son, Frank Kelton. He married Isabella Morrow Coit, a suffragist who was one of the first four women to attend The Ohio State University. Her mother was the local women's rights leader Elizabeth Greer Coit. Frank later traded houses with his brother Edwin to better accommodate the various sizes of their families.

Edwin's daughter Grace Bird Kelton was the last member of the family to own the house. She lived there until her death in 1975. Grace was one of the first people in the country to make her living as an interior decorator, having studied at both the Parsons School of Design and the Pratt Institute. Her work was widely recognized; along with other members of AID, she consulted on the Jacqueline Kennedy redecoration of the White House in the 1960s.

After Grace's death, the house was left to the Columbus Foundation. They lease it to the Junior League of Columbus, who restored it to represent a time period between 1852 and 1900. The house now operates as a museum and events facility. Approximately 80–90 percent of the furnishings that visitors can see in the home were owned by the Kelton family.

On the 3rd of November 2025, the house was severely damaged by a fire and explosion caused by a gas leak.
