= Campus Area Bus Service =

Public transportation system at Ohio State University

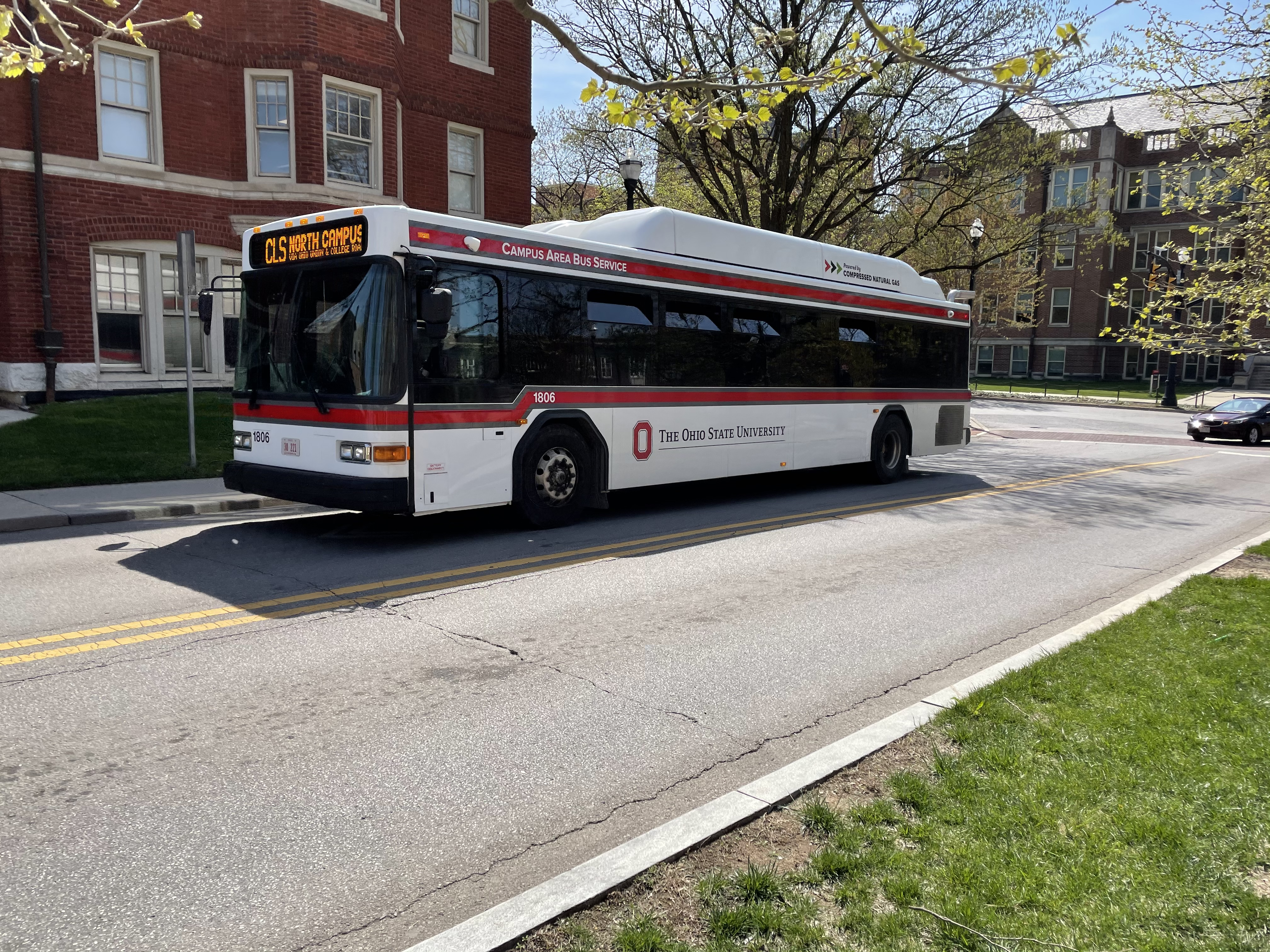
- A CABS bus driving the Campus Loop South route
- Parent: Ohio State University
- Founded: 1923
- Service area: OSU Columbus campus and off-campus housing
- Routes: 5
- Stops: 46
- Annual ridership: 5 million
- Fuel type: Compressed natural gas, Diesel
- Director: Beth Snoke
- Website: ttm.osu.edu/cabs

Campus Area Bus Service (CABS) is a free public transportation system at the Ohio State University's Columbus campus. The system consists of five bus routes that connect various points of Ohio State's campus, and the immediate off-campus area. The system connects with the Central Ohio Transit Authority's bus routes at several points.

The system is one of the largest campus transit systems in the United States. Ridership has grown from 4 million passengers in 2003 to an estimated 5 million passengers in 2015.

== History ==
Bussing has been available at Ohio State since at least 1923. At the time, there was a single 1921 Reo bus that was made out of plywood and had solid rubber tires. When it was first offered, it was primarily used to transport students between the main campus, and the agricultural campus across the Olentangy River.

By the 1960s, there were 19 buses in the fleet, and buses ran as far north as Ohio State University Airport, and as far south as the Children's Hospital. There was both regularly scheduled service, and on-demand service available by calling the bus operator.

In the 1970s, there were a series of pushes by the student governments to provide bus service between the campus area, and off-campus area where most students lived due to safety concerns. In 1971, a group of students chartered a bus from the Columbus Transit Company to act as a shuttle between on-campus and off-campus arrest. Two routes served the area, one each for North and South campuses. When the service began, it cost $4 for a quarter-long pass, or 25¢ per ride. It was originally operated as a flag-stop service, meaning that students could board the bus from any intersection by signaling to the bus. This off-campus service was discontinued in January 1972 due to low ridership.

In 1978, a bus linking the on and off campus areas, this time operated by Ohio State, began due to an increasing rate of rape occurring near campus.

In 1991, Ohio State attempted to cut daytime bus service over its cost, but halted the move after receiving negative feedback. Student leaders requested time to notify would-be passengers, and daytime service was cut in January 1992.

In 1998, the university began to heavily invest in bus service, raising its budget from $1 million to $2.5 million. A traffic study that year determined that adequate parking could never be built. The university found that investing in transit is cheaper than building garages. It raised parking fees for the main campus and used the funds to purchase additional buses and expand service hours (from 29,000 to 83,000). CABS began offering fixed route overnight as well as weekend service as part of these changes. Ridership subsequently increased from 1.2 million in 1998 to 2.3 million in 1999.

In 2009, CABS buses were equipped with GPS devices, giving passengers real-time arrival times for the bus system.

In 2012, the university gave parking operations to a private contractor. The move cut off the bus system's revenue stream, so the university moved to fund the service from its endowment.

In 2013, the Wexner Medical Center's Patient Courtesy Shuttle system was transferred to Transportation & Traffic Management, the organization that oversees CABS. This allowed the integration of PCS drivers into one seniority system, and ensured the availability of additional drivers in the event of illness, expansion of service, etc. The Patient Courtesy Shuttle service began overnight service as part of this transition, providing door to door rides for late night staff as well as visitors and patients of the hospital.

On November 23, 2018, a bus carrying Ohio State University Wexner Medical Center employees was hit by a truck at an intersection resulting in at least 17 injuries. The truck driver was determined to be at fault. Following the incident, the university stated it would add more buses at peak times on the route to reduce overcrowding and that it was purchasing additional buses.

The COVID-19 outbreak in 2020, along with ongoing construction projects on Central and West Campus, led to a reorganization of routes and service times for transit operations. Increased bus frequency was initially required after students were permitted to return to campus but required to follow social distancing guidelines. Fixed route overnight service was replaced by a fully on-demand system utilizing shuttle buses which allow greater flexibility along with Medical Center Patient Courtesy Shuttle services.

== Services ==
CABS routes can be planned through the Pivot app, a tool developed by Smart Columbus in 2020 for multi-modal trip planning and payment. An earlier service, called Connect and Ride or C-Ride, was developed with researchers at Battelle Memorial Institute in 2014.

=== Routes ===
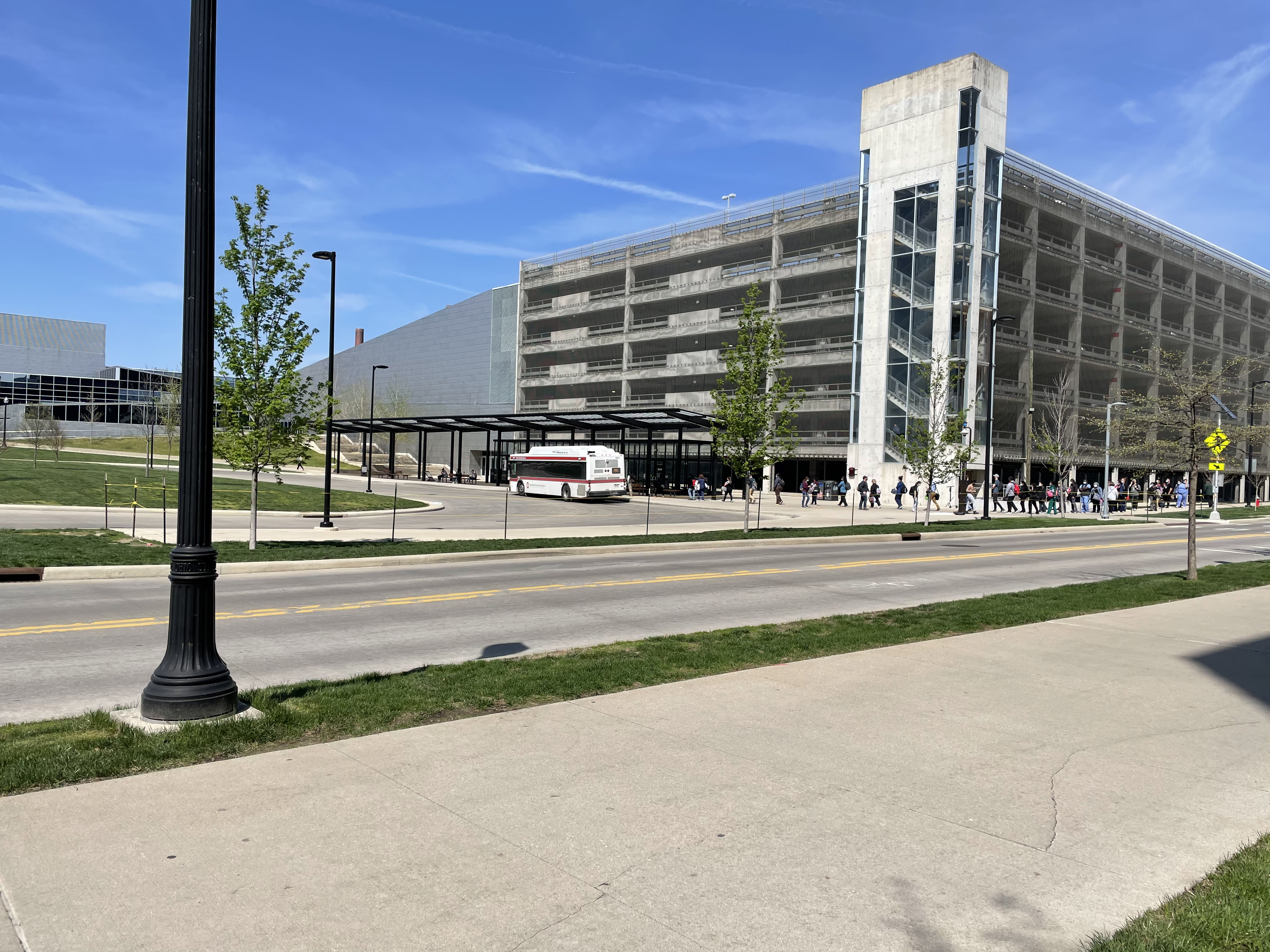
The Herrick Transit Hub serves the CLS and the CC, as well as the 30 COTA bus. It previously served the MC and NWC before being rerouted through the medical center and north campus respectively.

CABS currently operates five routes on Ohio State's main campus. Most routes run from early morning to night on weekdays, with some routes also offering late-night, 24-hour, and weekend service. Additionally, the university provides a pickup and dropoff service for disabled students.

Abbreviation	Route name	Route description
BE	Buckeye Express	Travels from central campus with a clockwise loop around the Ohio Union
CLS	Campus Loop South	Travels counter-clockwise around central campus, and up to the Buckeye Lot
ER	East Residential	Travels from the Ohio Union to off-campus housing east of campus
MC	Med Center Express	Travels from the Carmack parking lots to the Herrick Drive Transit Hub
CC	Campus Connector	Travels clockwise around central campus, and to the Carmack parking lots

CABS also operates two shuttles which serve the medical center:

Abbreviation	Route Name	Route description
ACK	Ackerman Shuttle	Travels from the Ackerman complex down to the medical center
MM	Morehouse to Med Shuttle	Travles from Morehouse and the James Outpatient Care center to the medical center

=== Previous Routes ===
CABS had operated a vast network prior to the COVID-19 pandemic, but many of the routes it operated have never been reimplemented. Service among the 19th Avenue within campus have been withdrawn after 2015 spring semester as the East Residential route was rerouted among High Street. Routes along the Annie and John Glenn Avenue have been abandoned after the 2020 spring semester after the North Express and Buckeye Village routes have been suspended, and services on Niel, Lane, and 12th Avenues have been withdrawn after the 2020 spring semester after the Overnight & Weekend service had been suspended.

Starting in Fall 2012, such services have operated, as shown in the table below. Nowadays, only the Campus Loop South, Med Center Express, and East Residential services have had continous operations, albeit through different routes.

Abbreviation	Route name	Time Frame	Route description
NE	North Express	-Spring 2020	Traveled from north campus via RPAC and 17th Avenue in the counterclockwise direction to Carmack.
CLN	Campus Loop North	-Spring 2020 Fall 2021-Spring 2022	Traveled from Carmack and looped around campus in a clockwise direction. At the time, it served the same stops as Campus Loop South, which ran in a counter-clockwise direction. Both routes used to be routed through 12th Avenue and on the southern border of the medical center. Starting in fall 2017, both CLS and CLN were routed through the Herrick Drive Transit Hub, and traveled up to Buckeye Lot instead of Carmack. CLS was colored blue after fall 2017. CLN temporarily closed during the COVID-19 pandemic, but was withdrawn after spring 2022, replaced with the Campus Connector and the Buckeye Express instead.
CC	Central Connector	-Spring 2014	Traveled from Mid Towers to Dennison Place via Woodruff Avenue and College Road.
BV	Buckeye Village	-Spring 2020	Traveled from north campus via RPAC and 17th Avenue in the counterclockwise direction to Buckeye Village via Kenny and Ackerman road in a clockwise direction. Buckeye Village closed in 2022.
WC	West Campus	Fall 2017- Spring 2021	Traveled from Carmack and looped around campus in a clockwise direction. Starting in fall 2020, WC was rerouted through 11th Avenue. In fall 2022, WC was retired and replaced with the Campus Connector and Buckeye Express.
OW	Overnight & Weekend	Fall 2017-Fall 2020	Traveled from the Buckeye Lot Loop to Carmack, and then operated in a clockwise direction around Campus among Neil Avenue, Lane Avenue, High Street, College Road, 11th Avenue, Herrick Transit Hub, and Cannon Drive.
BL	Buckeye Loop	Fall 2020-Spring 2021	Traveled from RPAC to Buckeye Lot via Fred Taylor Drive and Olentangy River Road in a clockwise direction

== Operation ==
The Campus Area Bus Service employs students for bus operation; approximately 67 percent of its drivers were students, provided with on-the-job training, in 2009.

All of the buses in the CABS fleet are outfitted with automated passenger counters and GPS devices to gather data about ridership and bus performance as a part of Ohio State's Campus Transit Lab.

At least 33 of the 47 total buses in the fleet are powered by compressed natural gas (CNG) in an effort to reduce emissions, including six that were purchased with funds from the Volkswagen emissions scandal settlement. The transition from diesel to CNG began around 2015 due to the environmental and cost benefits, prompting a long-term plan to move the entire bus fleet to CNG. The move follows COTA, which began operating its first 30 CNG buses in 2013. CABS' fleet also includes several hybrid-electric vehicles.

== Gallery ==
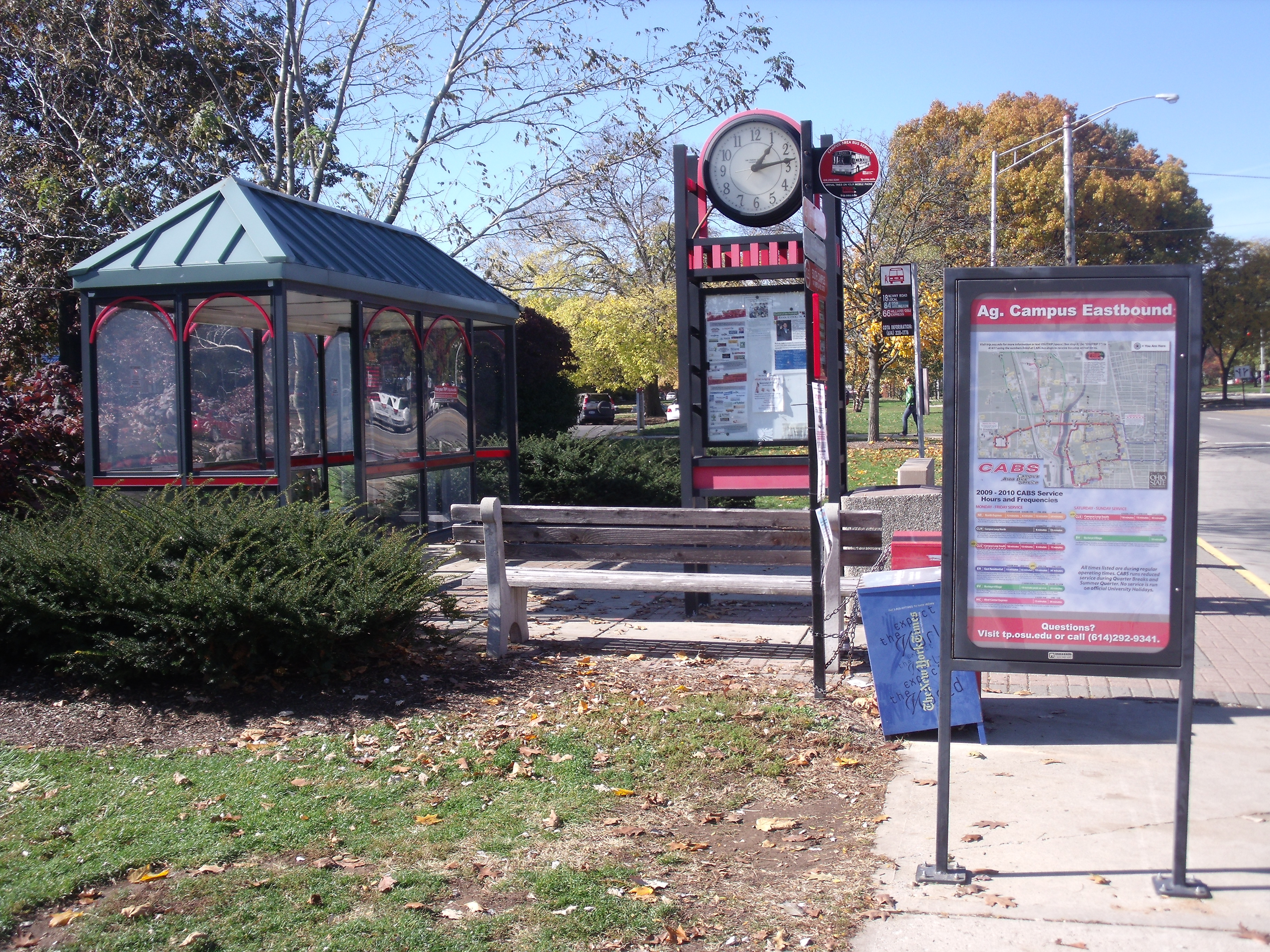
A CABS bus stop with previous branding

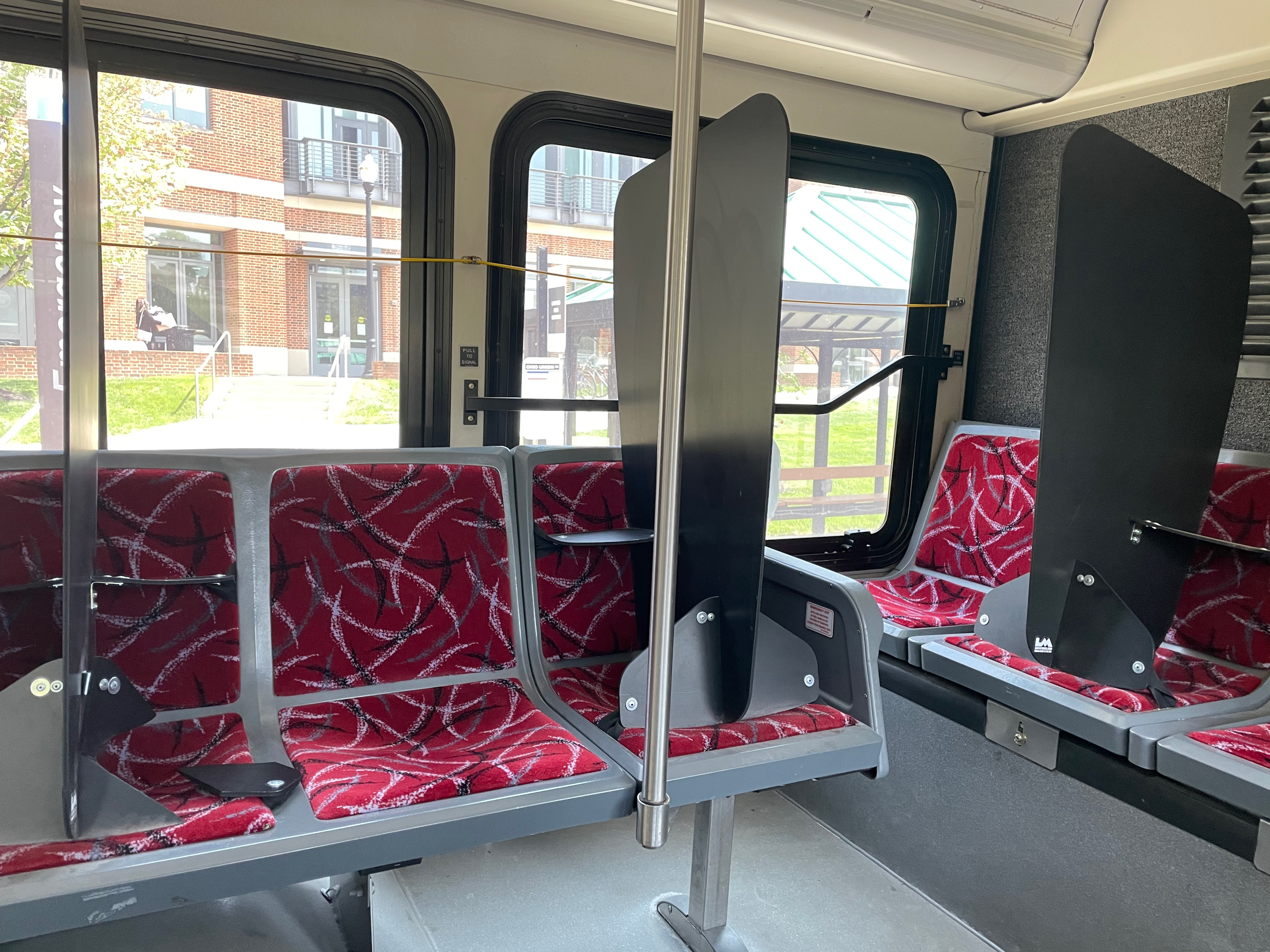
The interior of a CABS bus, with dividers installed on seats due to the COVID-19 pandemic

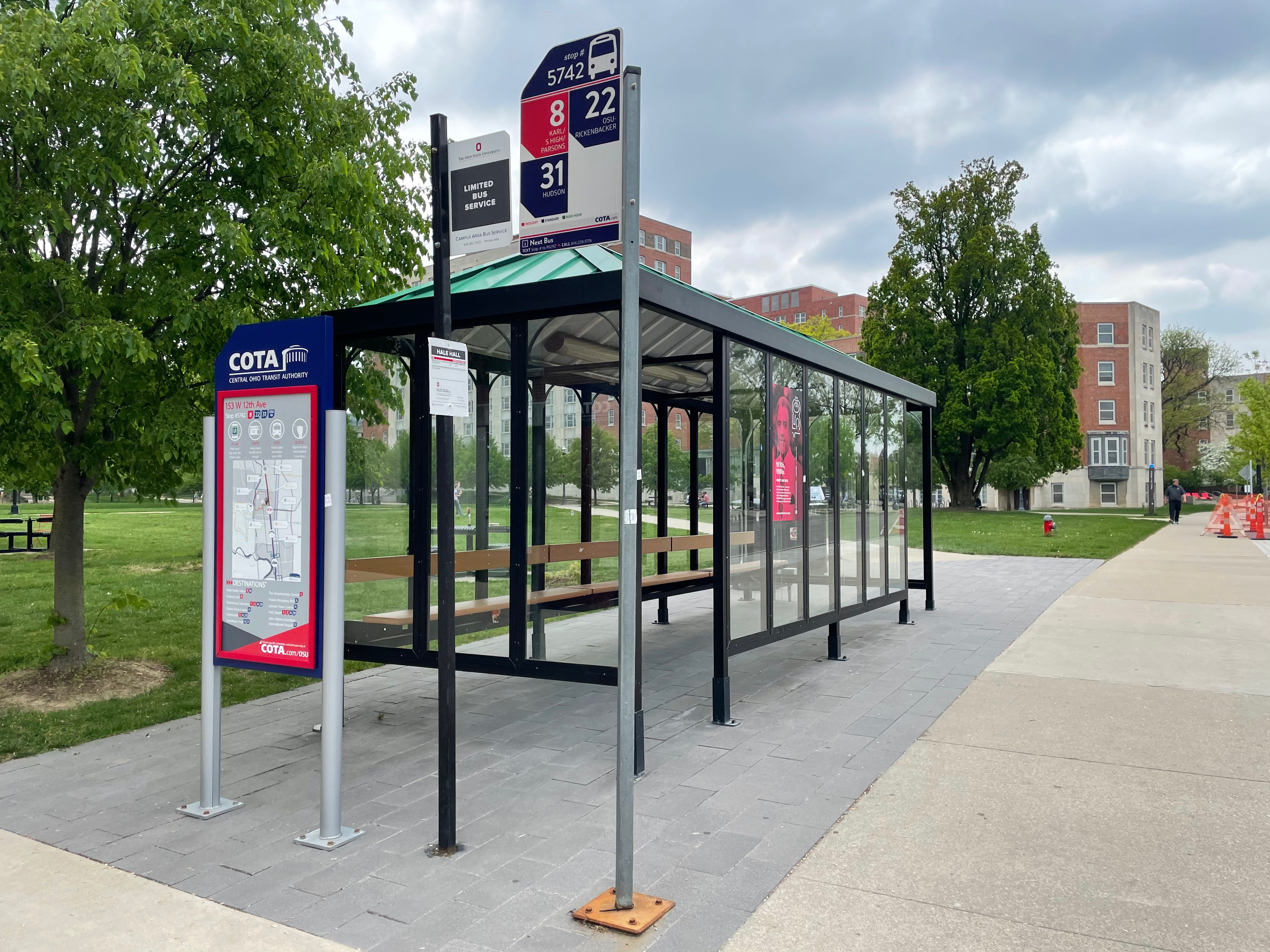
A former CABS and COTA stop across from Hale Hall

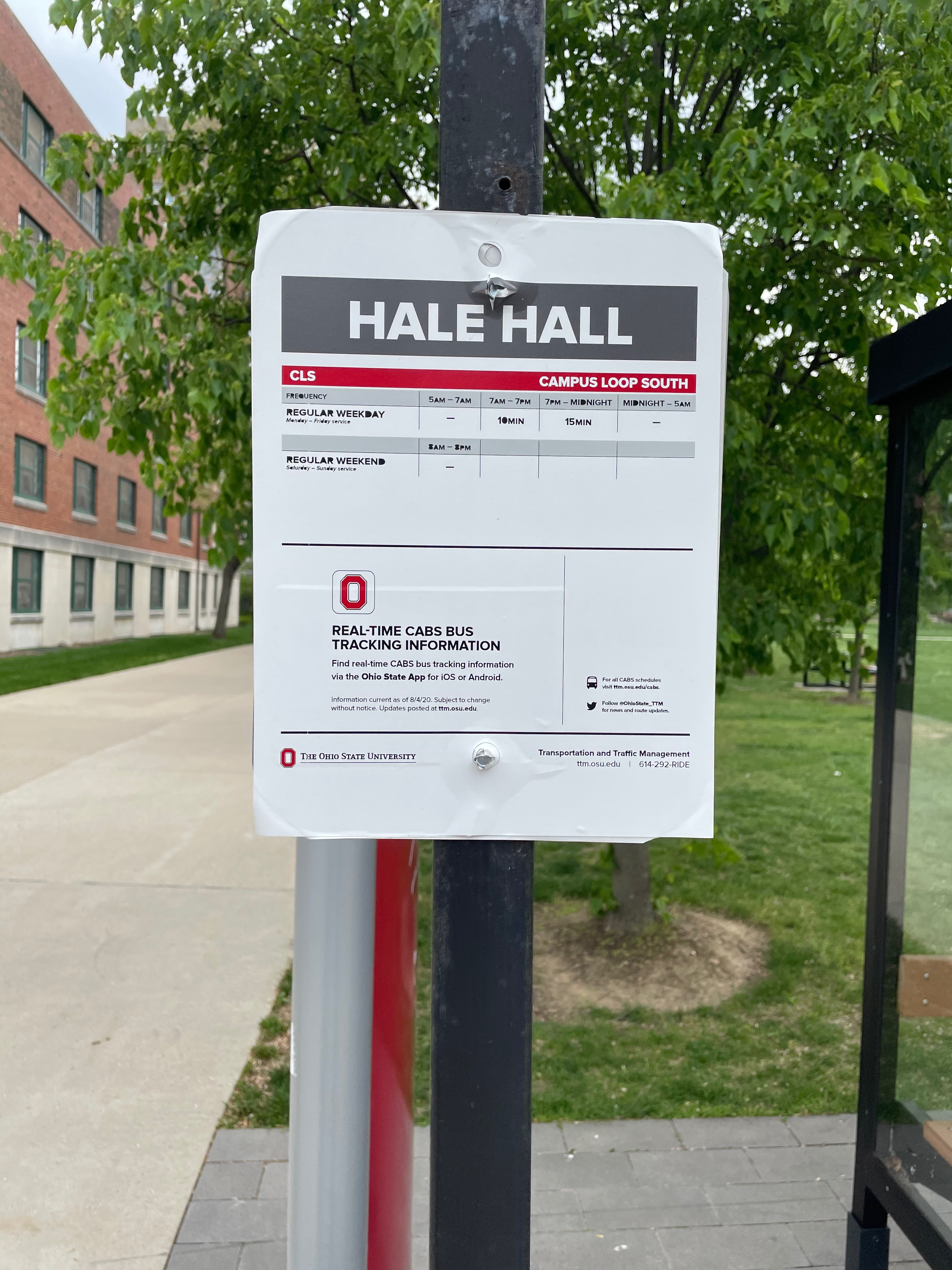
An example CABS timetable

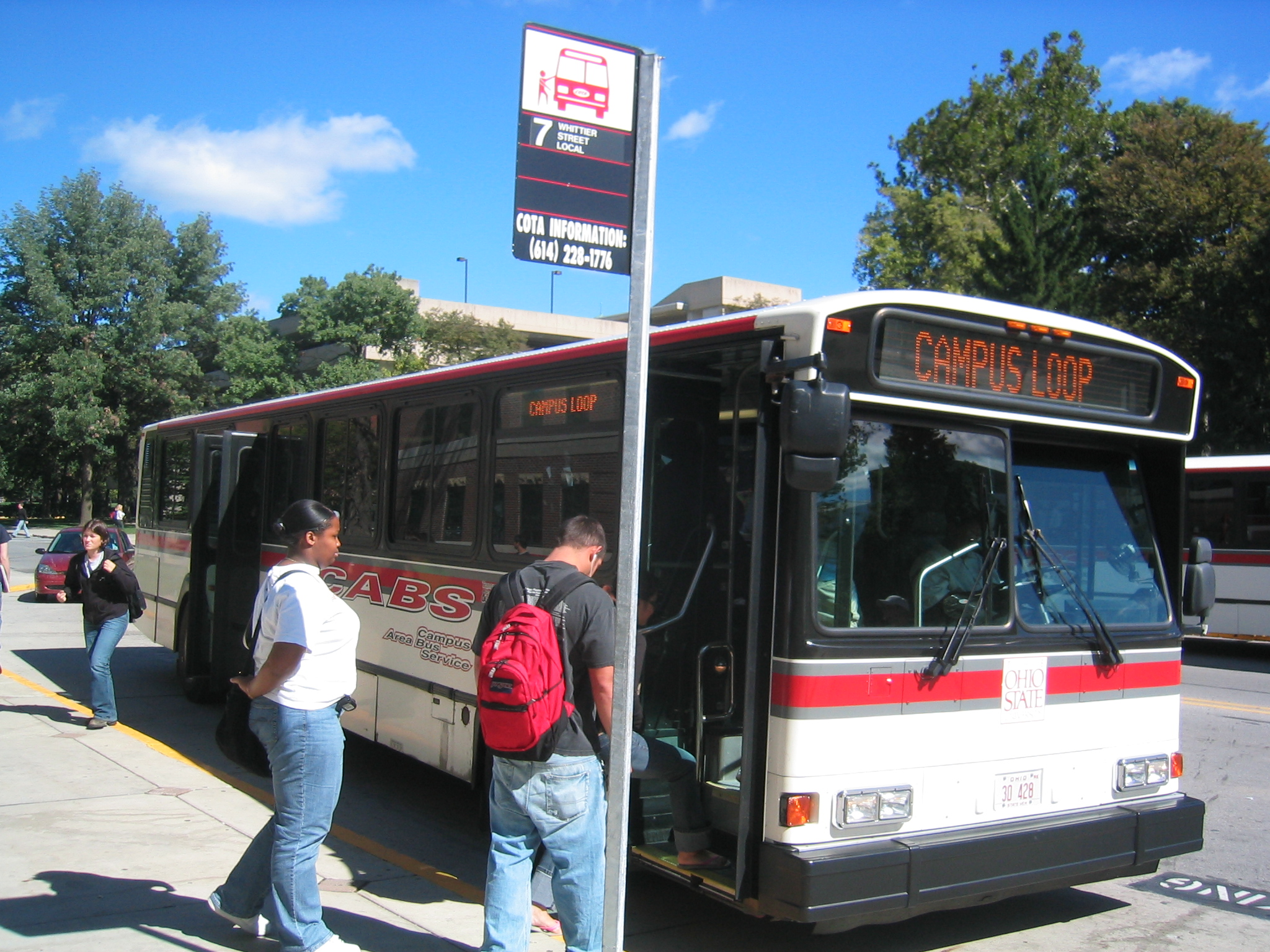
A CABS bus in a previous livery

== See also ==
- Public transit in Columbus, Ohio
- List of bus transit systems in the United States
