= Public transit in Columbus, Ohio =

Overview of public transportation in Columbus, Ohio

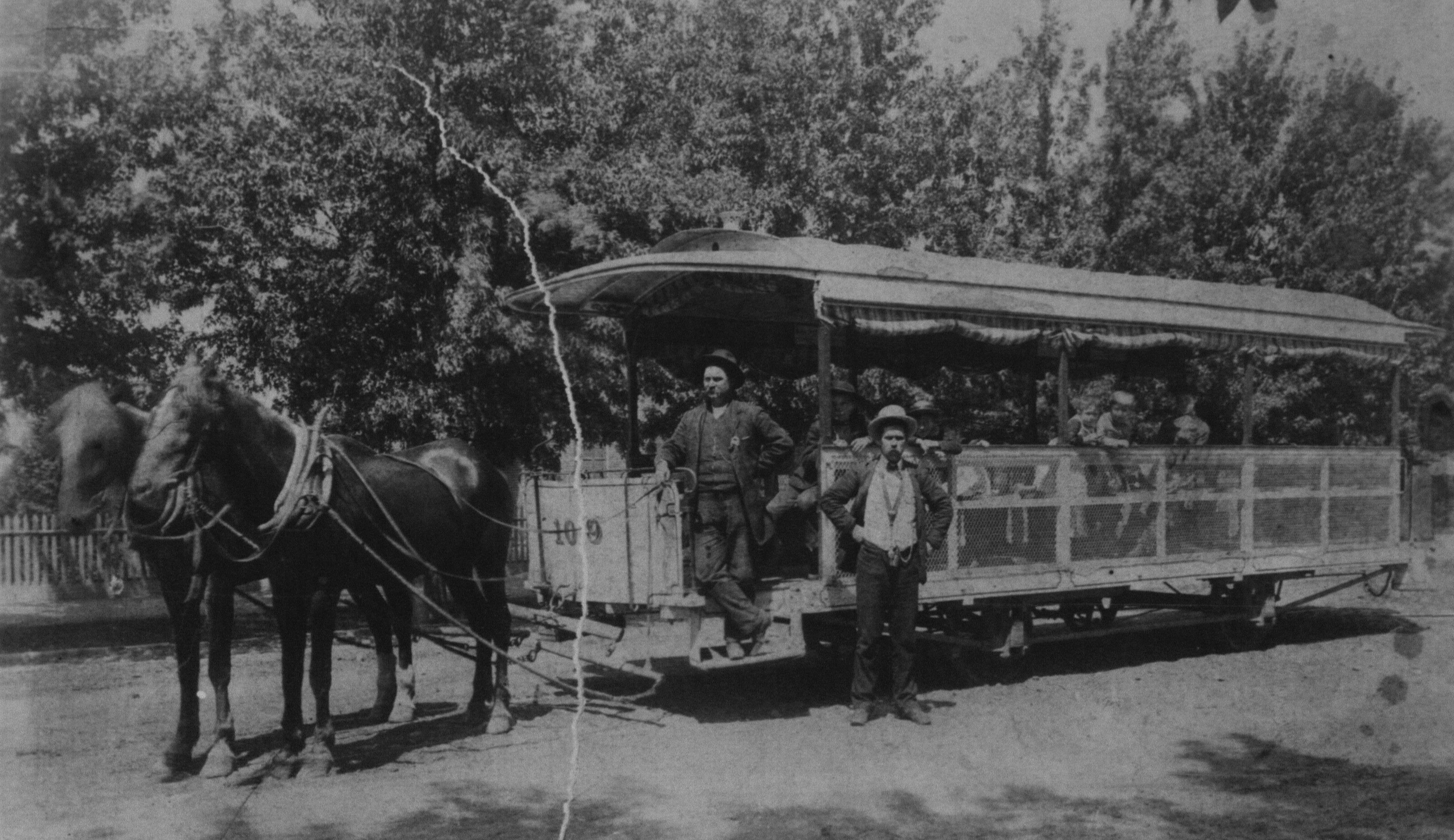
A local horsecar in 1888

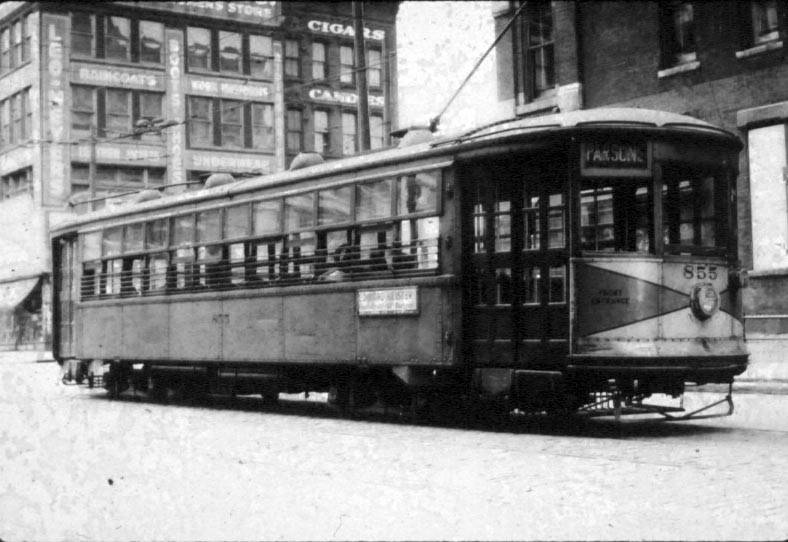
A local electric streetcar in 1948

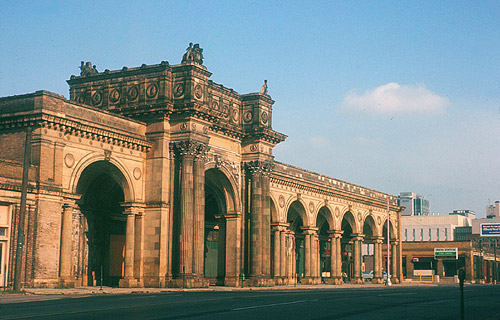
Union Station in 1970

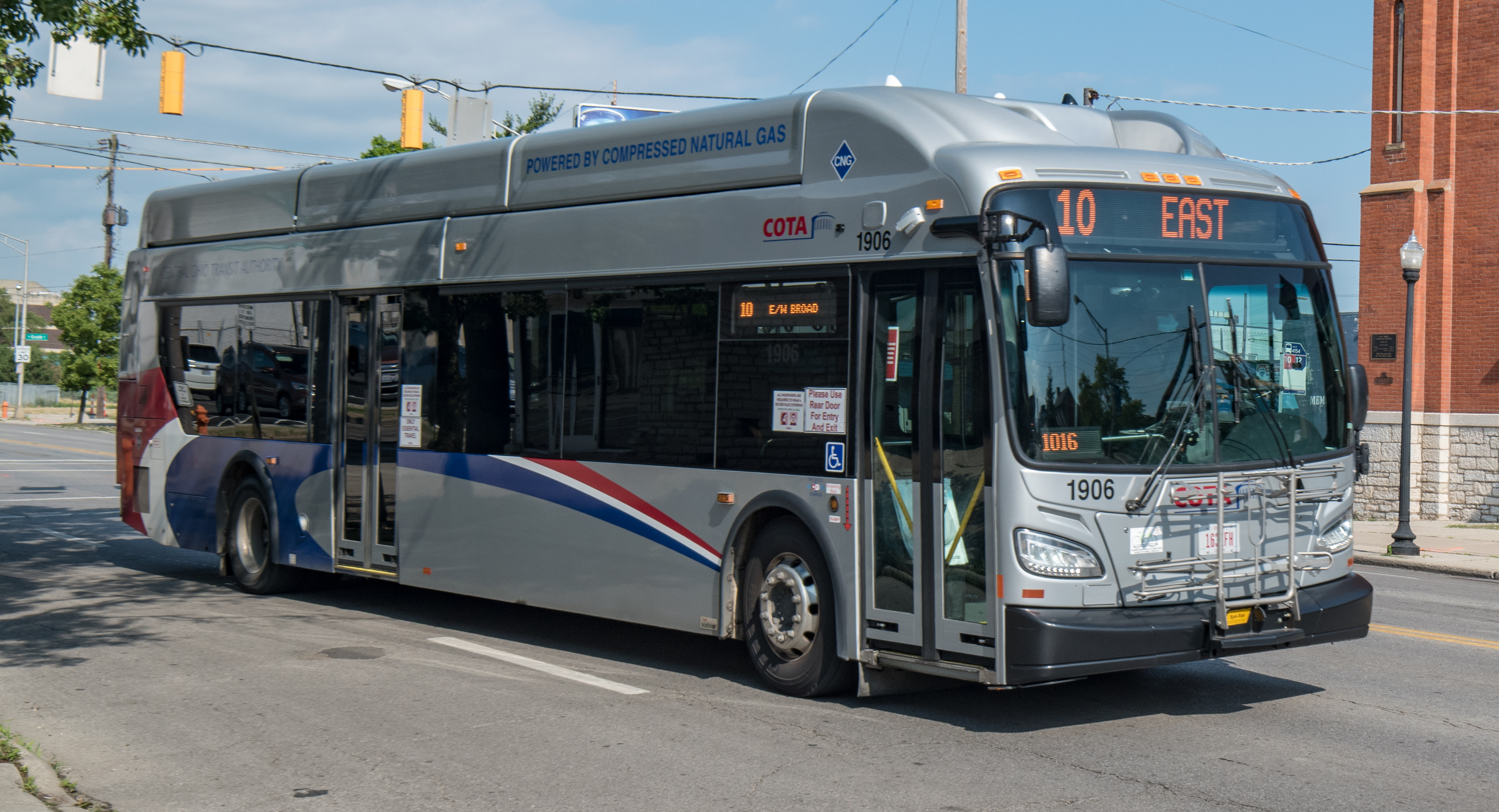
A COTA CNG-fueled bus in 2020

Public transit has taken numerous forms in Columbus, the largest city and capital of Ohio. Transit has variously used passenger trains, horsecars, streetcars, interurbans, trolley coaches, and buses. Current service is through the Central Ohio Transit Authority's bus system, numerous intercity bus companies, and through bikeshare, rideshare, and electric scooter services.

Public transit began in Columbus with Union Station, built in 1851. The station was jointly operated by the Columbus and Xenia Railroad and the Cleveland, Columbus and Cincinnati Railroad, making it the first union station in the world. Local mass transit efforts began three years later, in 1854, with the founding of the Columbus Street Railroad Company. It only began operating in 1863, utilizing a fleet of horsecars (horse-drawn streetcars). Electric streetcars began operation in the city in 1888. Meanwhile, subsequent rail stations were built in the city, including the third Union Station, completed in 1897. Streetcars and their longer-distance interurban counterparts became prolific around this time. In the 1930s, as automobiles grew in popularity and track maintenance suffered, the streetcars were all converted to trolleybuses, taking place from 1933 to 1948. Trolleybuses only operated until 1965, themselves replaced by diesel buses. With private bus operators losing profits, bus service in Columbus was transferred over to the public Central Ohio Transit Authority (COTA) in 1974. Intercity rail permanently stopped serving Columbus in 1977. COTA operated traditional local bus service until the 2010s, when it began modernizing its fleet with compressed natural gas-fueled buses, redeveloped its route network, and added a downtown circulator, bus rapid transit line, wifi connectivity, contactless payments, and other modern amenities. Though resuming local or intercity rail has been proposed since the 1970s, Columbus is currently the largest city in the United States without any form of passenger rail service. Amtrak service to Columbus is proposed under the American Jobs Plan.

== Historical services ==
=== Intercity rail ===
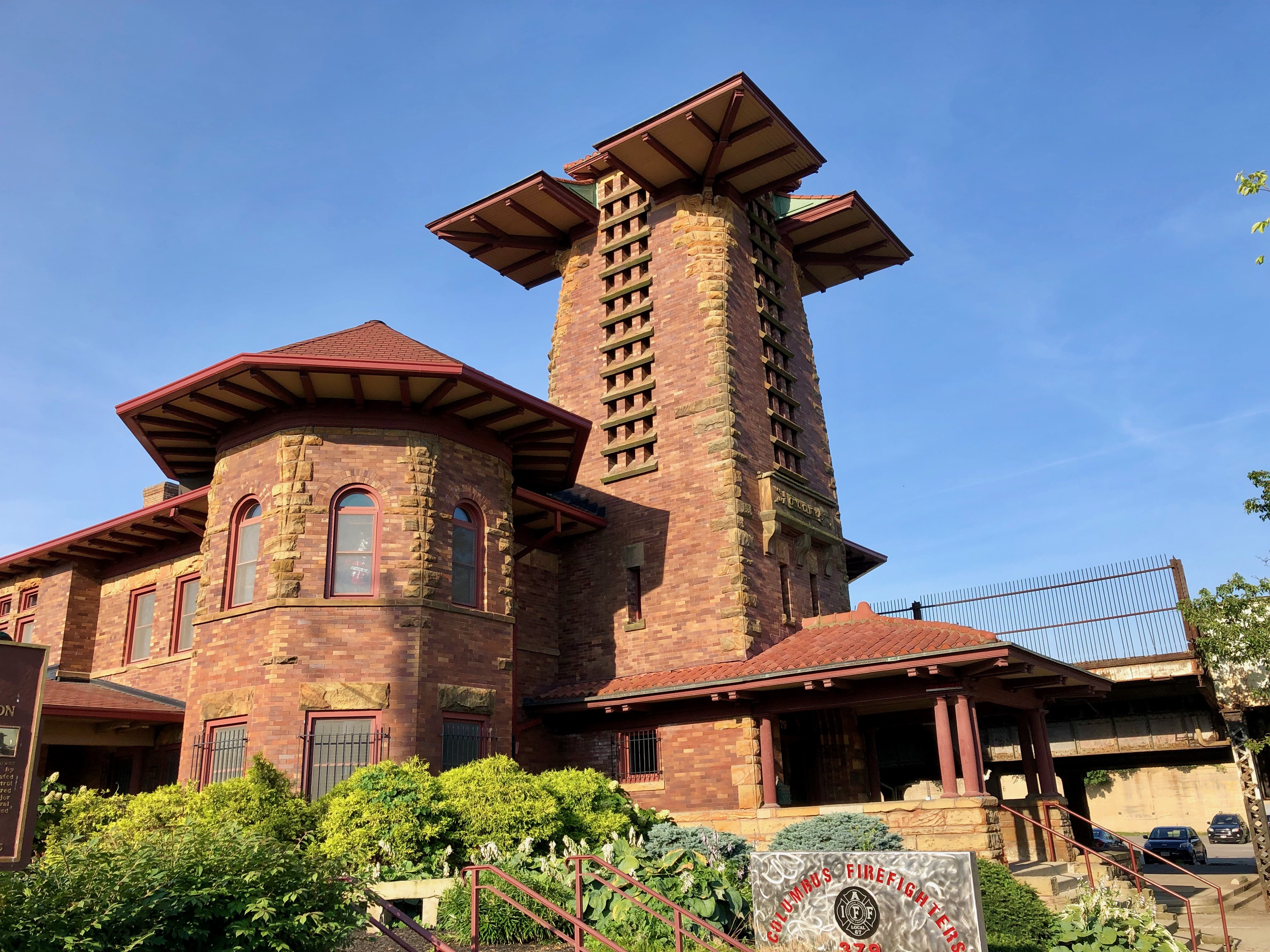
The Toledo and Ohio Central Railroad Station (1895) is the last remaining station building in Columbus

Public transit began in Columbus with the creation of its first train station, the first Union Station. The station was located in Downtown Columbus, Ohio, near The Short North neighborhood. Union Station and its predecessors served railroad passengers in Columbus from 1851 until April 28, 1977. The first station building was the first union station in the world, built in 1851. It was twelve years before any local mass transit was developed in the city. Its replacement was built from 1873 to 1875, just before demolition of the first station building. After traffic problems on High Street, as well as increased rail traffic became problematic, a new station was planned by Daniel Burnham beginning in 1893. The new station opened in 1897, and its arcade along High Street was finished in 1899. By 1928, part of the arcade was demolished. Passenger service significantly declined from the 1950s to the 1970s. The arcade was demolished in 1976 to make way for a new convention center, although it had been placed on the National Register of Historic Places two years prior. Train service stopped at Union Station in 1977, and the remaining portions of the station were demolished in 1979. The demolished arcade was delisted in 1999. A portion of the arcade was saved and is the focal point of the McFerson Commons park in the nearby Arena District.

The Toledo and Ohio Central Railroad Station also served the city's Franklinton neighborhood, located near downtown. The station was built in 1895 and designed by Columbus architects Yost & Packard. It served the city from 1896, diverting services from the second Union Station, until 1930, when its services moved to the third Union Station. The Toledo and Ohio station is the only remaining rail station building in the city.

=== Mass transit ===
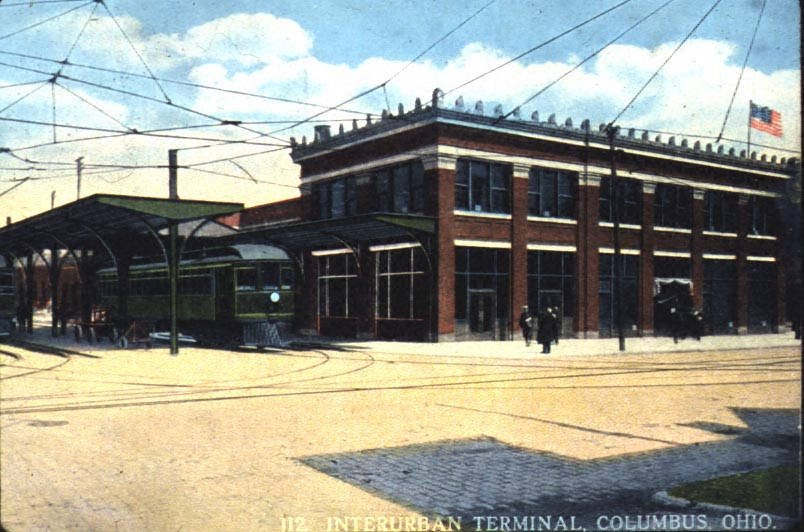
The Columbus Interurban Terminal

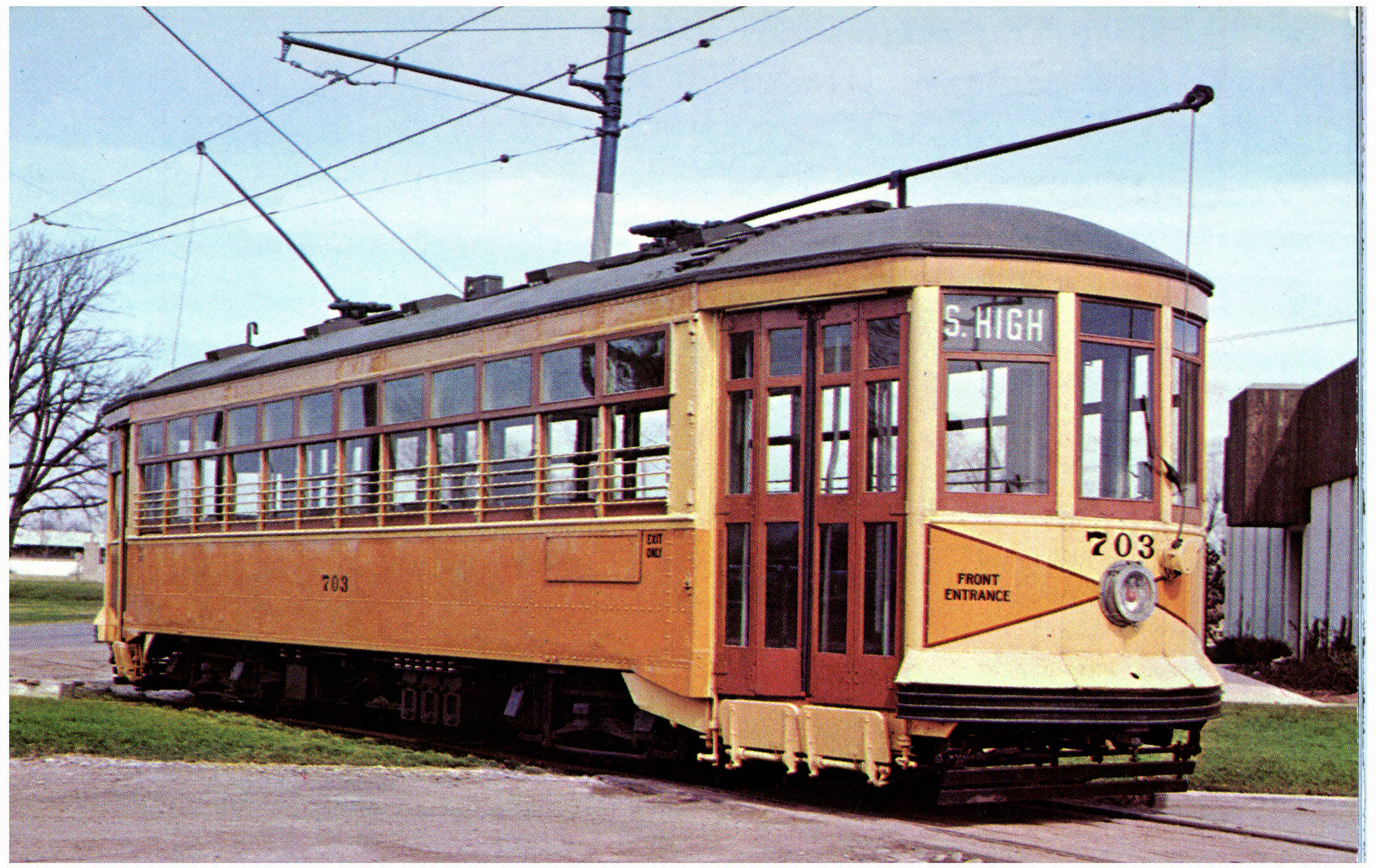
One of two remaining Columbus streetcars, operated 1926–1948, and now at the Ohio Railway Museum

The first public transit in the city was the horse-drawn omnibus, utilized in 1852 to transport passengers to and from the city's first train station, and in 1853, between Columbus, Franklinton, Worthington, and Canal Winchester.

First formed in 1854, the Columbus Street Railroad Company (CSRC) was authorized by the city to build a number of lines, but nothing came about initially. Its horse-powered streetcar line first ran along High Street on June 10, 1863, in the midst of the Civil War. The initial line ran for 1.5 miles (2.4 km) from Union Station to Mound Street. When traffic dropped off after the war, the Columbus Street Railroad Company faced financial difficulties, but started making a profit by 1868. Following the stabilization of the High Street line, the Friend Street Railroad Company was created in the same year, first reaching East Public Lane (now Parsons Avenue) and eventually reaching the Fairgrounds (now Franklin Park).

Subsequently, the North Columbus Railroad Company, East Park Place Street Railroad Company, State and Oak Street Railroad Company, and the Glenwood & Green Lawn Railroad Company were formed. The horse-powered cars were slow, but made it possible to travel to locations within the city that were beyond a comfortable walking distance. Mergers were frequent, and the Columbus Railroad Company (formerly CSRC) merged with the Friend Street Railroad Company and the East Park Place Railroad Company. The new venture was known as the Columbus Consolidated Street Railroad Company. The State and Oak Street lines were bought by the new company in the following years. Other transit companies came and went in the late 1800s, many of which never became operative.

It was also during this era that long distance rail travel became quite popular. The High Street line faced delays of up to seven hours per day due to the level crossing of 10 heavy rail tracks across High Street at Union Station. To remedy the problem, subway tunnels were built under the tracks. They were dark, and the smell from the horse droppings made the trip unpleasant. From the period of 1863–1892, more than a dozen horsecar companies set up shop in the city, and total trackage was expanded to 34.5 miles (55.5 km) prior to electrification.

In 1888, the first electric powered streetcar ran on Chittenden Avenue from High Street to the State Fairgrounds. However, it was not successful initially. The first line with successful electrification was the Glenwood & Green Lawn Street Railroad (with trackage mainly along West Broad Street), which was completed in August 1890. The High Street, Long Street, and Mount Vernon Avenue lines were electrified in the following year. The advantages in speed and cleanliness quickly made equestrian power obsolete, and the last horse drawn car ran in 1892, when service fully transitioned to electric streetcars. Also in that year, yet another naming change came with the sale of the Columbus Consolidated Street Railroad Company to the newly formed "Columbus Street Railway Company" for $3,000,000. At this time, the Glenwood & Green Lawn line was acquired. In 1895, the Columbus Railway, Power and Light Company purchased an amusement park that would be known as Olentangy Park. It was located on the southern end of Clintonville. The idea behind the purchase was to increase ridership on the line during non-peak hours by providing an attractive destination at the terminus. Likewise, other transit companies built Indianola Park on North Fourth Street and Minerva Park in the village of the same name.

Notable streetcar strikes took place in 1890 and 1892. In the 1890 strike, employees sought higher pay and shorter hours. Their one-week strike was supported by the public, and led to increased wages and hour reductions from 16-hour days to 12-hour days.

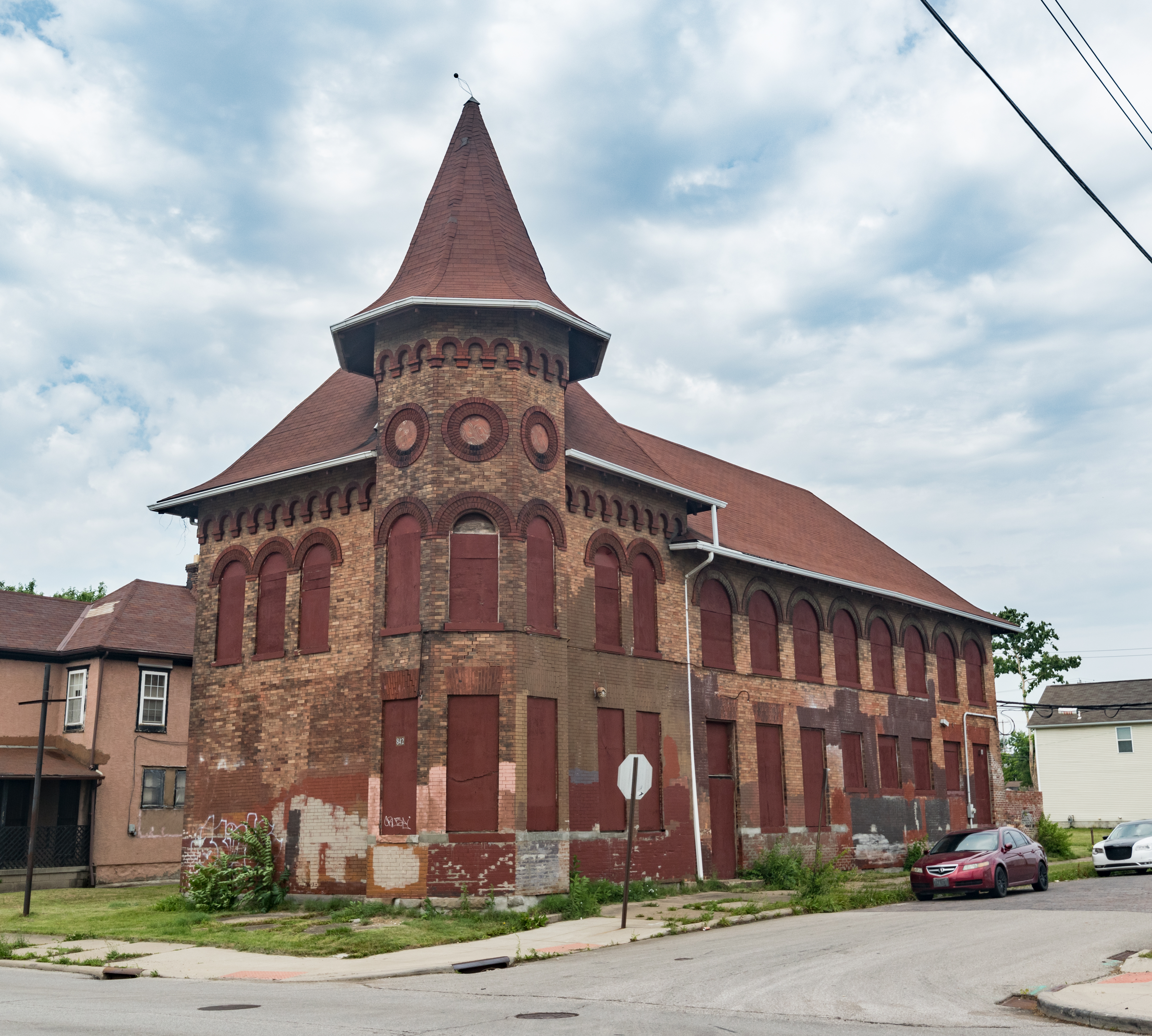
The former Columbus Railway, Power & Light office in present-day Milo-Grogan, 2021

In 1893, the Columbus Railway Power & Light Company was formed, controlled by E. W. Clark & Co., the same entity that controlled the Columbus Street Railway Company. The Columbus Railway Power & Light Company eventually controlled all streetcar and electric lighting business in the city.

Electric power ushered in the golden age of street traction in Columbus. In 1899, the High Street subway tunnels were replaced with a bridge which ran above the heavy rail tracks. The system was so popular that Columbus Railway Power & Light experimented with a double deck streetcar in 1914. However, the delays in loading and unloading gave the bi-level design no advantage over its standard counterpart, and the cars were quickly retired. Total trackage reached 71 miles (114 km) by 1916, and the system carried 66,000,000 paying passengers with an additional 16,000,000 people riding on transfer tickets that year. By 1927, streetcars ran to Bexley, Gahanna, Green Lawn Cemetery, Minerva Park, Marble Cliff, Upper Arlington, Westerville, and Worthington.

Most streetcar lines in Columbus used a broad gauge track which measured 5 ft 2 in (1,575 mm). Building non-standard gauge was sometimes used as a way to keep long distance passenger and freight railroads from accidentally or intentionally running their cars on city streets. However, some lines built in the late 1800s used the 4 ft 8 1/2 in (1,435 mm) standard gauge width, such as the Worthington Line which ran long Summit Street, Hudson Avenue, Arcadia Avenue, and High Street. With the advent of the interurban, many sections of dual gauge track were built to allow the streetcars and interurbans to use the same route despite their different widths.

=== 1910 streetcar strike ===
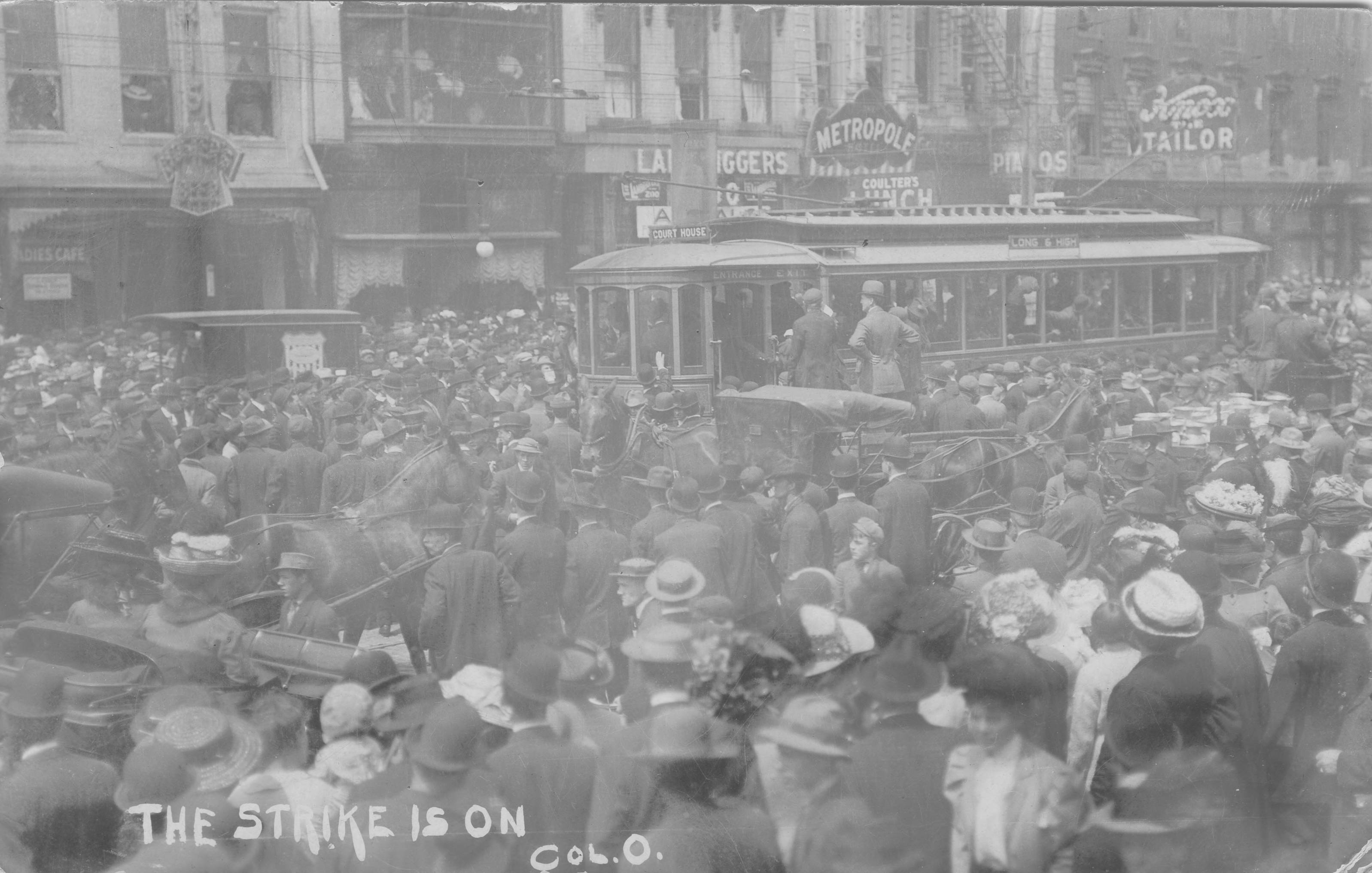
Crowd during the 1910 strike

In the summer of 1910, the city experienced a large uprising. The 1910 Streetcar Strike began as peaceful protests, but led to thousands rioting throughout the city, injuring hundreds of people. Conditions for the streetcar workers were difficult. The operators worked for only 19–20 cents per hour, worked 60–65 hours per week, and worked for years without a day off. These conditions led to a high turnover rate. The Columbus Railway and Light Co. paid its riders to report on irregular employee activities, and the company wouldn't require hearings before firing employees for dishonesty. In early 1910, 35 employees of the company met with manager E.K. Stewart, requesting increased wages. The company fired the entire group as a result. In March, about half of the Columbus Railway and Light Company's employees formed a local chapter of the Amalgamated Association of Street and Electric Railway Employees labor union. The union sought the reinstatement of the 35 workers, along with pay raises, better working conditions, and job stability. The streetcar company chose a hardline position, with no compromise offered.

The public primarily sided with the union. The Columbus Chamber of Commerce, anticipating conflict, hosted a mandatory meeting between the union and company in June 1910. On July 23, its hearings concluded, finding that both parties were partly at fault, and that a peaceful resolution should be found. The meeting mostly added to tensions, however, and the strike began the next day at 4 am. The union's chapter had grown to 600 members by this point. They planned to not show up for work, instead selling union buttons around the city and picketing the company's streetcar barns. The streetcar company chose to hire strikebreakers at $30 per week, over double the standard wage of $12.50. They also hired a special policing force, supplied by the local John J. Mahoney Detective Agency, to protect the streetcars and facilities. The strike ended up more serious, as crowds barricaded streetcar tracks and threw bricks and rocks into the streetcars. The company police responded with gunfire. That night, 76 people were arrested, though riots continued on the following day. Mayor George Sidney Marshall called in about 5,000 members of the Ohio National Guard. The troops kept order in the city until their departure on August 7. More rioting then took place, with shootings, barricades, stonings, and streetcars blown up with dynamite. It led to the National Guard returning, and the union and public moreso aiming for a peaceful end to the riots. Still about 3,000 to 4,000 strikers, sympathizers, or disrupters continued to riot. It led to a bad public image of the city, hurting business activity, and worrying the city planning for a state fair in September. On October 18, the union admitted defeat, and its 570 striking workers either returned to work or moved to work elsewhere in Columbus, or for Cleveland streetcar companies.

=== Further history ===
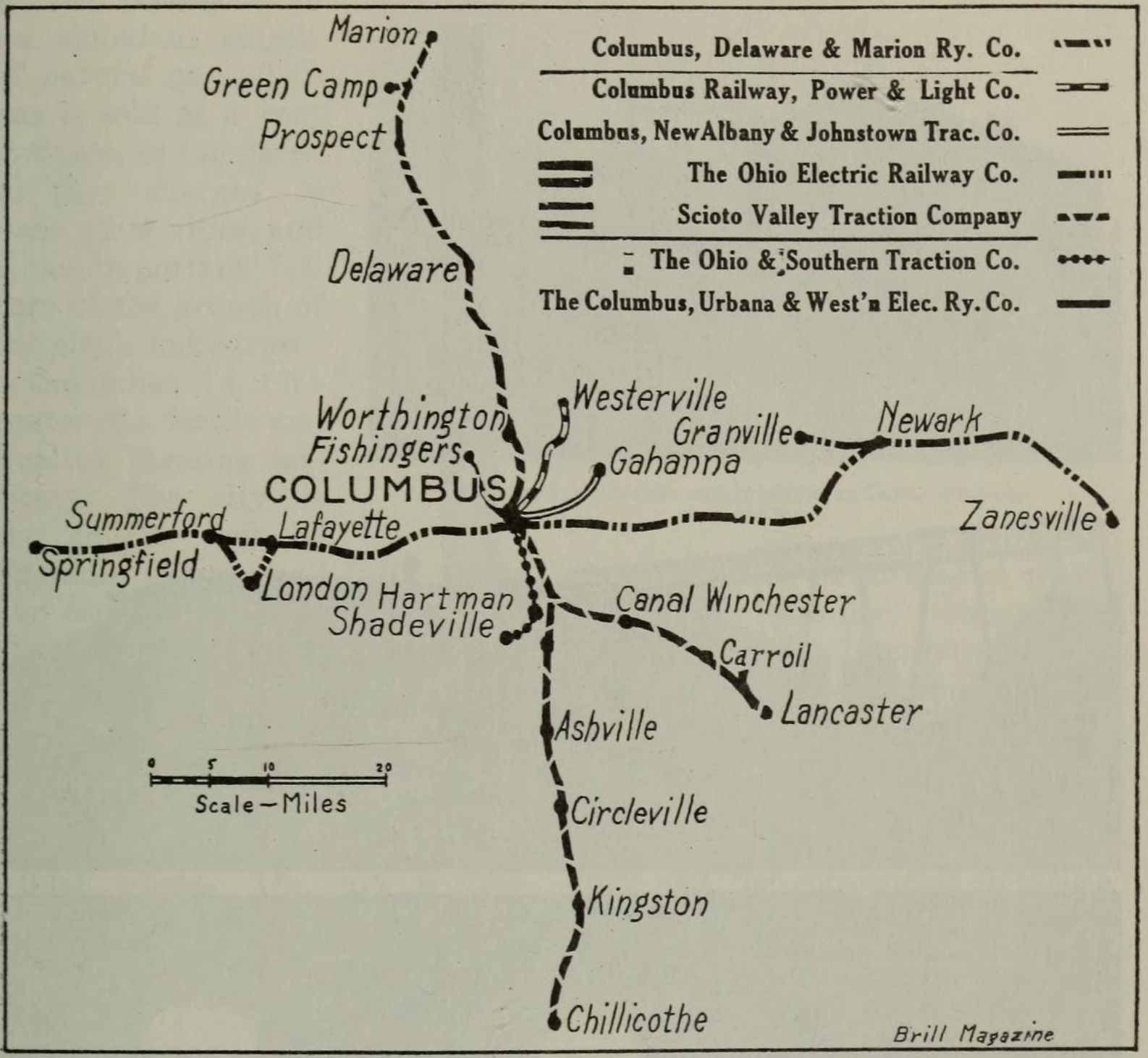
The interurban system in 1917

Only three years after the streetcar strike, the Great Flood of 1913 affected the transit system, causing millions in damage, destroying streetcar tracks and bridges, and stopping service west of the Scioto River for a month. Buses first began service in the city in 1926, with the Fifth Avenue bus line established that Christmas Eve. The first buses to operate were Mack gas-electric vehicles, which operated on crosstown feeder lines for people who lived far from streetcar routes. Buses began operation on former streetcar lines within the next several years.

Interurbans declined quickly after World War I, with competition from buses and private vehicles. The last line to operate out of Columbus was the Cincinnati & Lake Erie, in 1938.

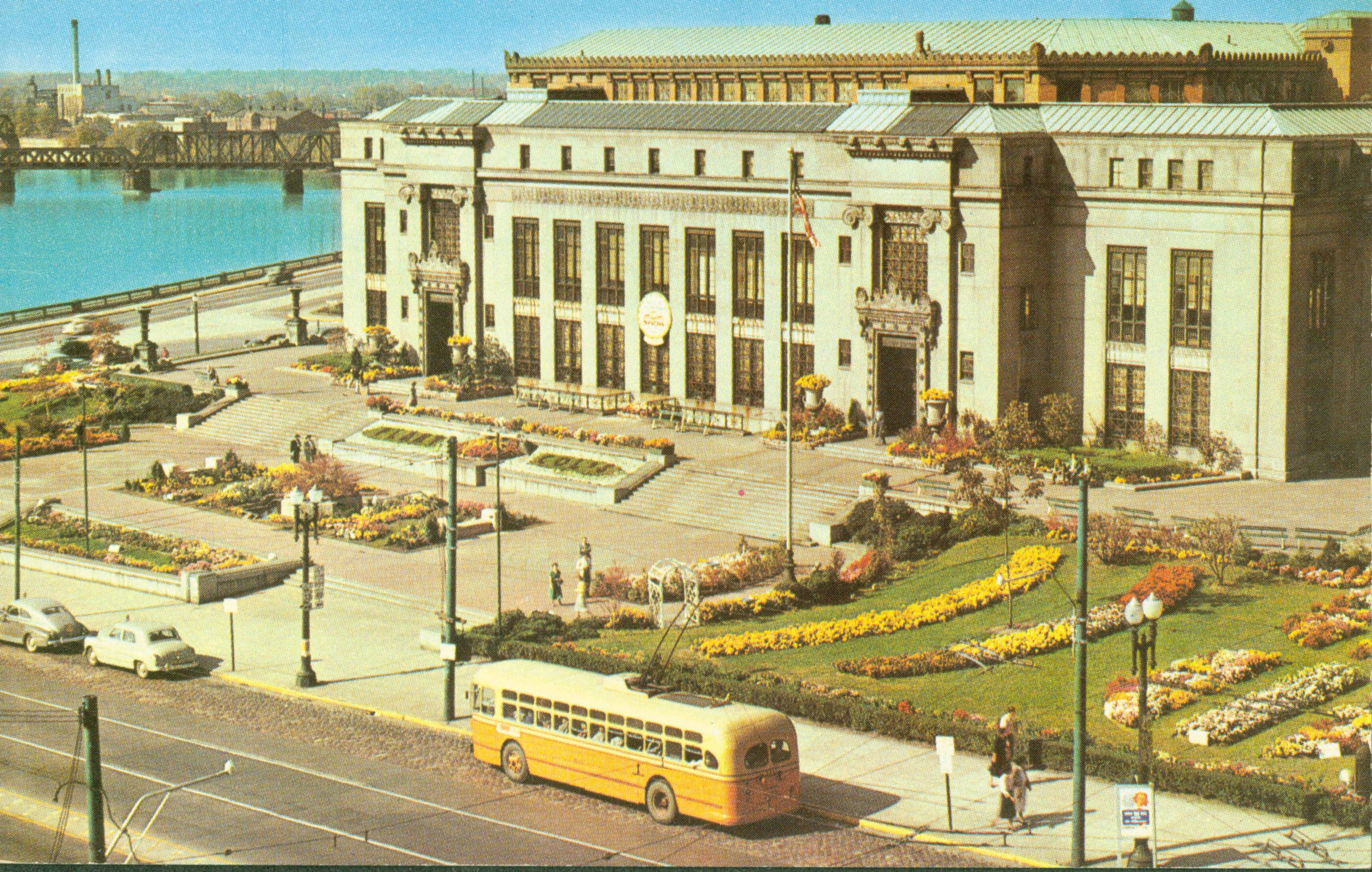
A trolley bus in front of Columbus City Hall, c. 1936-55

Similarly, in 1933, a decision was made to gradually convert the entire streetcar system to trolley buses (trackless trams). Slowed by the effects of the Great Depression and World War II, the process took 15 years to compete. The Columbus Railway, Power & Light Company was renamed to the Columbus and Southern Ohio Electric Company in 1937. On September 5, 1948, the last two fixed rail trams ran along Neil Avenue and Main Street. The electric company handed over its transit operations to the Columbus Transit Company in November 1949. A lack of investment in maintenance of the tracks, as well as the age of the automobile had slowly brought the demise of the system. The buses were larger, more comfortable and powerful, and soon had air conditioning. The trolley buses did not last long either, being gradually replaced by diesel buses as well. The last trolley bus ran on May 30, 1965. That last ride traversed the Main, Oak, and High Street lines, a 5.5-hour ride that culminated in a ceremony for pulling down a trolley pole and de-energizing the streetcar lines.

Bus investment continued throughout the 1960s and 1970s, though ridership had been irreversibly declining since 1948, with a monumentous drop from then through 1972 – from 80.1 million passengers to 15.2 million. In 1973, the Columbus Transit Company went out of business. The company was subsequently replaced by the government agency the Central Ohio Transit Authority (COTA), which still operates today.

Despite some changes over the years, many current COTA buses run the same routes as the former streetcars. Bus lines 1, 2, 4, 6, 7, 8, 10, 11 and 13 deviate very little from the routes taken by their railed predecessors.

Around 2017, the company Hopper Carts began serving downtown and the Short North with a free ridesharing service paid for by businesses and with ads on the sides of the vehicles. The company utilized several six-passenger Polaris GEM e6 vehicles, described as "retro-futuristic golf carts". Another program, car2go, operated in Columbus, mostly at Ohio State University and downtown, until 2018. The business operated Smart Cars available to rent by the minute.

Smart Columbus, a transportation initiative of the City of Columbus and the Columbus Partnership, operated two driverless shuttle pilots, in downtown Columbus and Linden, around 2018.

== Current services ==
=== COTA ===
Interactive map of COTA bus routes
Note: not all frequent lines remain frequent throughout their entire routes; see the official map for details.

Columbus maintains a widespread municipal bus service called the Central Ohio Transit Authority (COTA). The service operates 41 routes with a fleet of 440 buses, serving approximately 19 million passengers per year. COTA operates 23 regular fixed-service routes, 14 express services, a bus rapid transit route, a free downtown circulator, night service, an airport connector, and other services.

COTA's administrative offices are located in the William J. Lhota Building in Downtown Columbus. It is managed by President and CEO Joanna Pinkerton along with a 13-member board of trustees. COTA is funded by a permanent 0.25% sales tax as well as another 10-year 0.25% sales tax. The agency was founded in 1971, replacing the private Columbus Transit Company. The Central Ohio Transit Authority began operating in 1974, and has made gradual improvements to its fleet and network. Its first bus network redesign took place in 2017. The 2010s have also seen noted service improvements, with the addition of the CBUS free downtown circulator in 2014, its AirConnect airport service in 2016, and the CMAX bus rapid transit service in 2018.

=== Intercity buses ===
Intercity bus service is provided by Greyhound Lines, Barons Bus Lines, Miller Transportation, GoBus, and other carriers.

Intercity bus transit dates back to 1929 in Columbus. Numerous stations have been constructed in Downtown Columbus; the Columbus Bus Station was completed in 1969.

=== Alternative transportation ===
In partnership with UZURV, COTA provides on demand transportation for the elderly and disabled.

Along with most other US cities, Columbus has several private transportation options, including ridesharing, bikeshare, and electric scooters. The city's bikeshare system is CoGo, operated by Lyft. Electric scooter companies operating in the city include Bird, Spin, and Lime.

Ohio State University students, faculty, and employees are served by the Campus Area Bus Service, an Ohio State-run bus service around the Columbus campus.

== Proposals ==
=== Former proposals ===
==== TransCenter ====
TransCenter was a proposed replacement for Union Station. The demolition and replacement of Union Station dates to a 1969–1975 lawsuit against the Columbus-based Battelle Memorial Institute (BMI). The institute was formed as a nonprofit and still operates as one, though its improper profit uses led to the lawsuit. As a result, BMI offered about $80 million for various causes, including $36.5 million to establish a convention center at the site of Union Station. BMI established the Battelle Commons Corporation in 1974 to handle the project.

Battelle Commons Corporation applied for grants to create a transit center as part of the convention center, including from the Urban Mass Transit Administration (UMTA) and Federal Highway Administration. The transit center project was supported by the Central Ohio Transit Authority (COTA), Columbus's mass transit agency. The proposed hub, titled TransCenter, was to include 2,000 square feet inside the restored Union Station arcade, containing transit information, ticket offices, a bus waiting and loading area, and entranceways to transit below street-level. A new 20,000-square-foot bus facility and COTA office was to be constructed alongside the arcade. The proposed funding included $6.24 million from the UMTA for buildings and platforms, $1.05 million from the Federal Railroad Administration for restoring the arcade, and Battelle contributing $1.56 million for the building and platforms, and $450,000 for the arcade. The combined project was to cost $9.3 million. It was noted that Battelle made no effort to find funding from obvious sources including the State Historic Preservation Office, the National Endowment for the Arts, Department of the Interior, Community Development Block Grants, or General Revenue Sharing Funds.

On October 19, 1976, Battelle's trustees decided to demolish the station, stating it would be an "imprudent use of Battelle's money", even though it was noted to be a small portion. The organization gave no warning to outside organizations. The State Historic Preservation was not advised, nor was COTA; COTA's executive director stated the public mistakenly blamed it for the demolition. The City of Columbus also stated it was not involved in the decision, but knew Battelle was considering it. Battelle believed the demolition would not block the pending federal funding.

At 6 pm on Friday, October 22, 1976, S.G. Loewendick & Sons demolished nearly the entire arcade. By 6 pm on the next day, a temporary restraining order secured by the Ohio Historical Society halted the demolition. The order noted that improper procedures were followed in planning its demolition. Battelle then allowed the historical society 120 days to remove the remaining remnant of the demolition, a single arch left standing; Battelle offered no funds to help preserve or move the arch. COTA's director still expressed his desire for TransCenter to be built, despite the arcade's loss. Battelle published development plans with the arcade removed as soon as October 24. The arcade's demolition prompted the UMTA to withdraw all $6.24 million in funding, stating the act violated the spirit of the law and was inconsistent with UMTA requirements.

==== Ameriflora '92 Monorail ====
As part of the planning for the 1992 Ameriflora exhibition, Columbus city leaders considered a $50 million proposal to build monorails connecting the Port Columbus International Airport to the Greater Columbus Convention Center. The July 13, 1987, "very loose" proposal from Von Roll Habegger would have connected the Ohio Center with a loop along 3rd and High streets to the county offices at Mound Street, with a potential extension south to German Village and the Brewery District. A second proposed loop would cross the Scioto River to connect to the Ohio Penitentiary, Veterans Memorial, and Central High School. The estimated cost was $40–50 million, if a contract could be signed by 1988. The monorail would use rubber-tired beamrider cars carrying 4,000 to 8,000 passengers per hour at speeds up to 30 mph.

A committee formed to study the proposal, led by Upper Arlington Mayor Priscilla Mead, rejected it in November 1987. The committee recommended an automated peoplemover solution like those used in Detroit and Miami, with a daily ridership of 6,000 to 8,000 people, at a cost of $60–80 million.

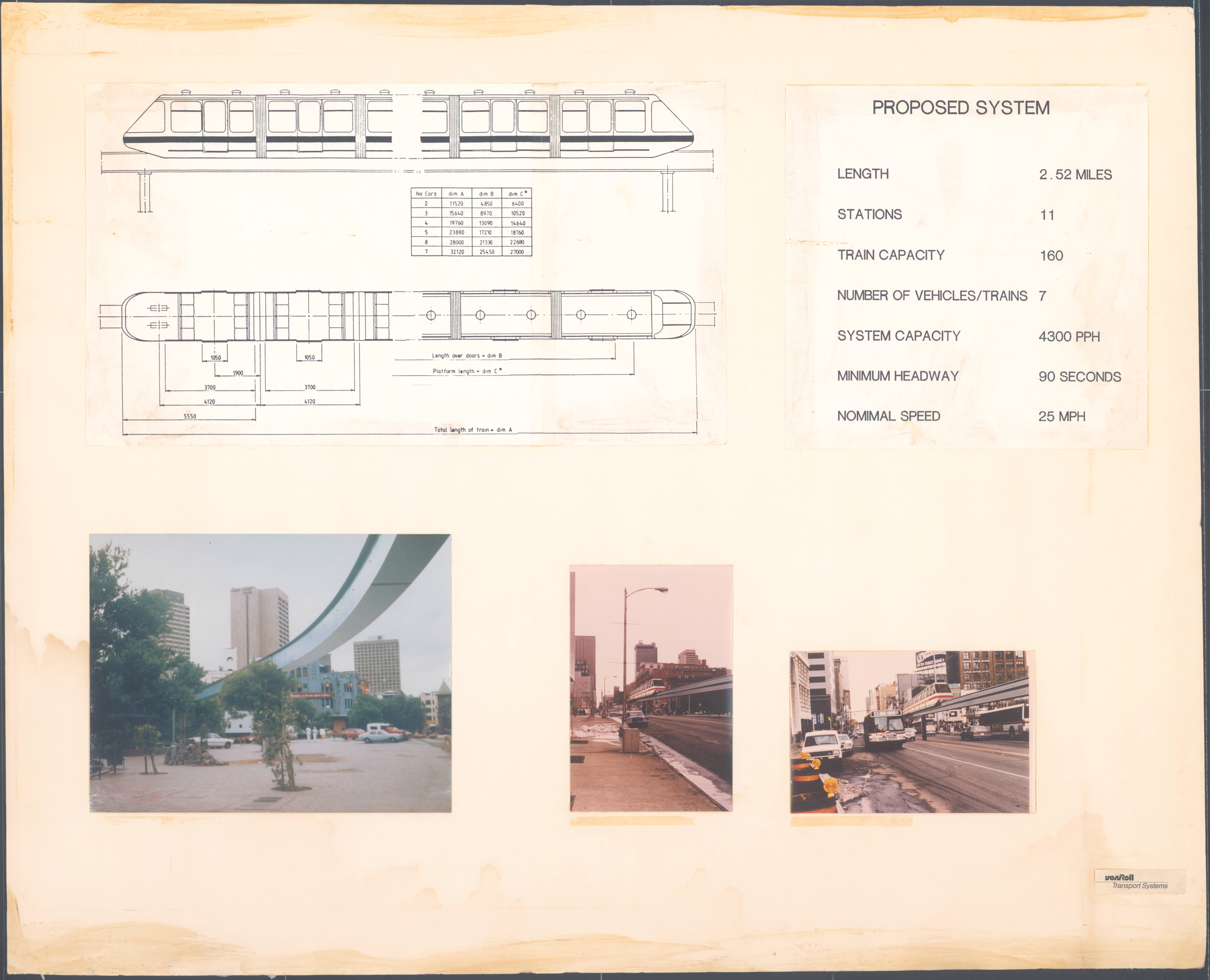
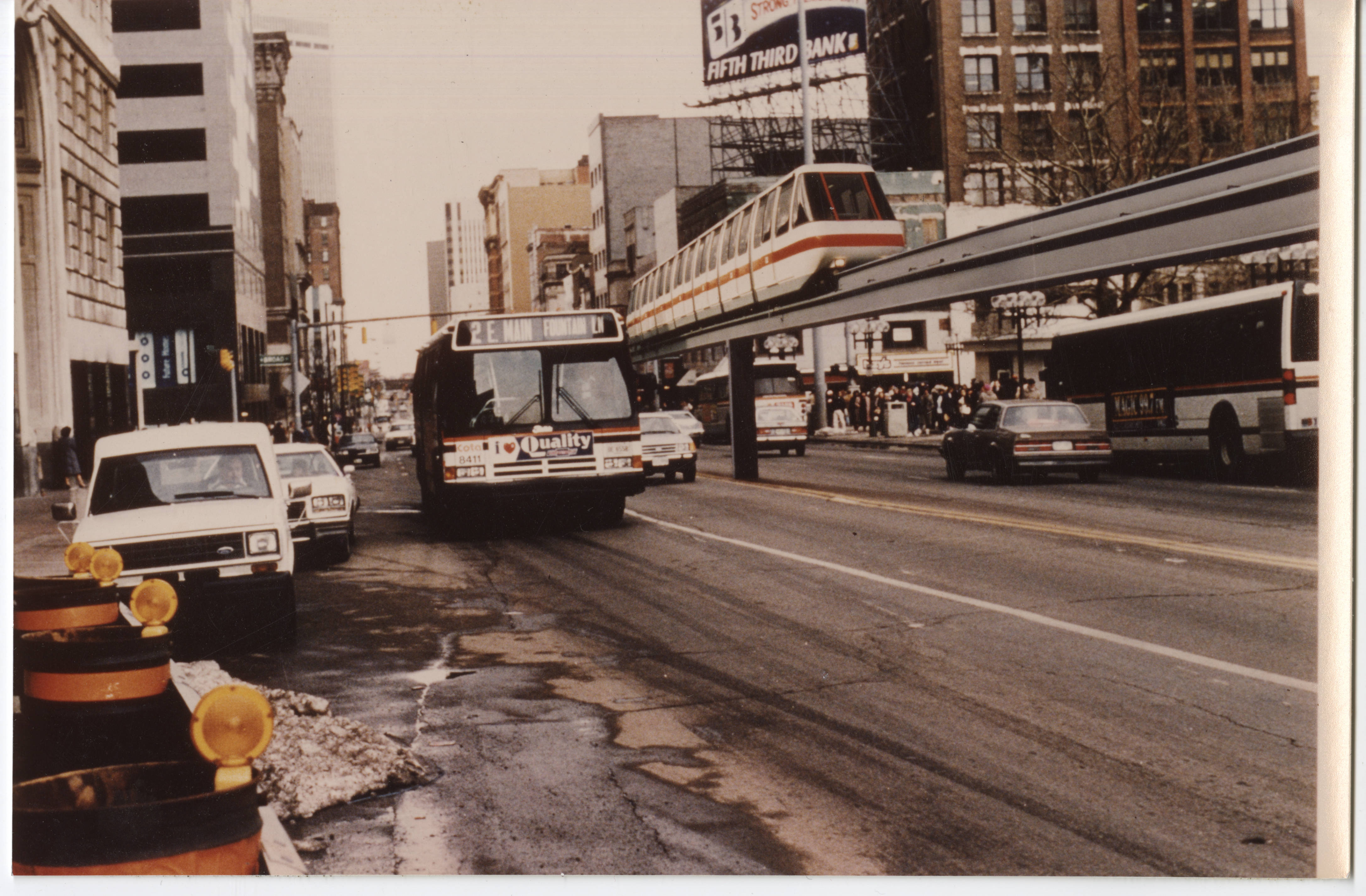
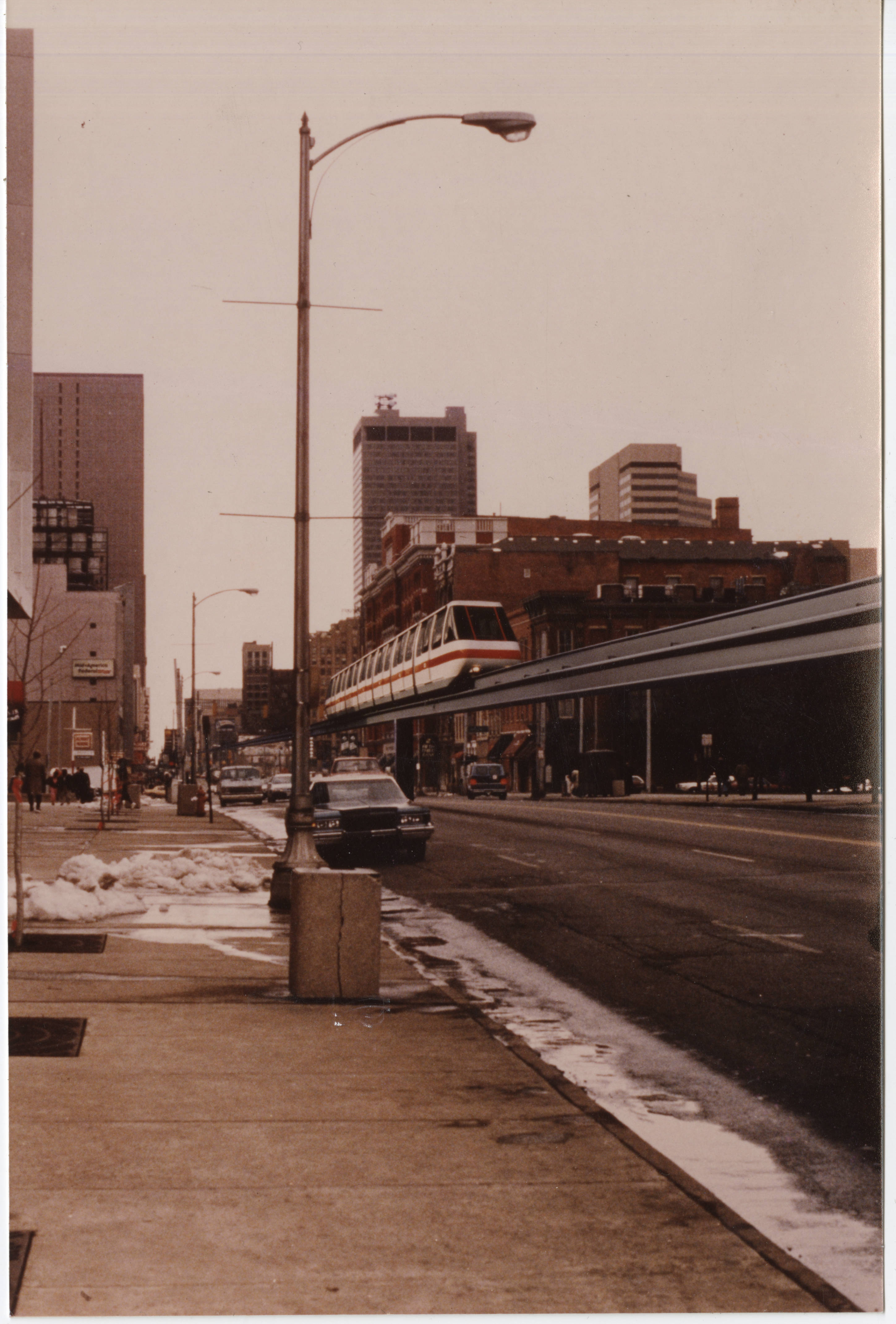
1987 monorail proposal by Von Roll Holding

==== Ohio Hub ====
The Ohio Hub project, created in 2009, proposed a high-speed rail service connecting Columbus with Cincinnati and to a proposed hub in Cleveland and onward to the east. As of 2018, the project remained unfunded.

==== Columbus Streetcar ====
The Columbus Streetcar was a proposed streetcar system to be located in and close to Downtown Columbus. Initially planned to run along High Street, the line would have run for 2.8 miles (4.5 km) and connected the Ohio State campus with the Franklin County Government Center. As of February 2009, the plan was indefinitely on hold.

==== Rail proposals ====
Various proposals have been discussed for light rail in Columbus. The first formal discussions took place in the 1980s. In 1999, voters rejected a levy request which would have funded it. In 2002, COTA began studying a 13-mile line from downtown to the north side. With an inability to win federal funding, the effort ceased in 2006.

COTA's long-range transit plan released in 1999 proposed eight commuter rail routes along existing freight rail tracks. The plan called for these services to be phased in from 2005 to 2020. COTA would begin operating a rail line north along I-71 in 2005, a northwest track along Ohio Route 315 in 2008, a track along Cleveland Avenue in 2011, along East Broad Street in 2014, another northwest track and southeast track in 2017, and a south track along Route 3 and West Broad track in 2020. Alongside the commuter rail improvements, the plan called for bus service to double, including 24-hour service, as well as a downtown rail service and multi-modal transit hub as well as multiple circulator bus loops. COTA placed two sales tax proposals on the November 1999 ballot to fund current service and these improvements, Issue 21 continuing a .25 percent sales tax for 10 more years, as well as Issue 20, a new permanent .25 percent sales tax. Issue 21 failed to pass, restricting COTA's ability to build rail lines.

=== Current proposals ===
Numerous proposals are being developed to link Columbus with other Midwest cities, and to link neighborhoods within Columbus. Transit modes being developed include intercity rail, the hyperloop, monorail, and light rail or bus rapid transit. A third-party organization known as Greater Central Ohio Public Transit Project (https://www.facebook.com/groups/GCOPTP) was founded late 2019 with a goal of getting an elevated monorail system to be considered for Columbus again. The organization seems to be still working on such goals presently. LinkUS is an initiative announced in 2020 to create high-capacity rapid transit in Central Ohio. The initiative is a collaboration between COTA, the City of Columbus, and the Mid-Ohio Regional Planning Commission. The initiative will also aim to create jobs as well as transit-oriented developments. It will begin its focus on Columbus's northwest corridor, and then to an east-west corridor consisting of Broad and Main Streets. City officials aim for projects like Indianapolis's Red Line (a bus rapid transit line). Federal funding was announced for the two corridors in November 2020, to be released in 2023 and 2024.

In 2021, Amtrak announced plans to connect Columbus to Cleveland and Cincinnati via intercity rail as a part of the American Jobs Plan. Details released in May 2021 describe a thrice-daily service between Cleveland and Cincinnati, stopping at Cleveland's airport, Crestline, Delaware, Columbus, Springfield, Dayton, and Sharonville before terminating in Cincinnati. The service is proposed to be completed by 2035. In anticipation of the plan, the Franklin County Convention Facilities Authority released a plan for a Columbus Amtrak station in January 2022. The plan details a $23 million station adjacent to the Greater Columbus Convention Center, to be built if Amtrak's plans are approved. The two-story station would have a single side platform. Other proposals submitted to Amtrak by 2022 include services to Athens, Chillicothe, Toledo, Fort Wayne, Indiana, and Pittsburgh, Pennsylvania.

The Pittsburgh-Columbus-Chicago corridor is one of ten selected by Virgin Hyperloop One for development of a hyperloop system. In April 2022, the hyperloop proposal stalled pending the technology's approval from the federal government. Two months earlier, Virgin Hyperloop announced it would lay off half of its staff and refocus its efforts to transporting freight instead of passengers.

== See also ==
- History of Columbus, Ohio
- Columbus streetcar arches
- Trolley District
