= Toledo and Ohio Central Railroad Station =

Station 67
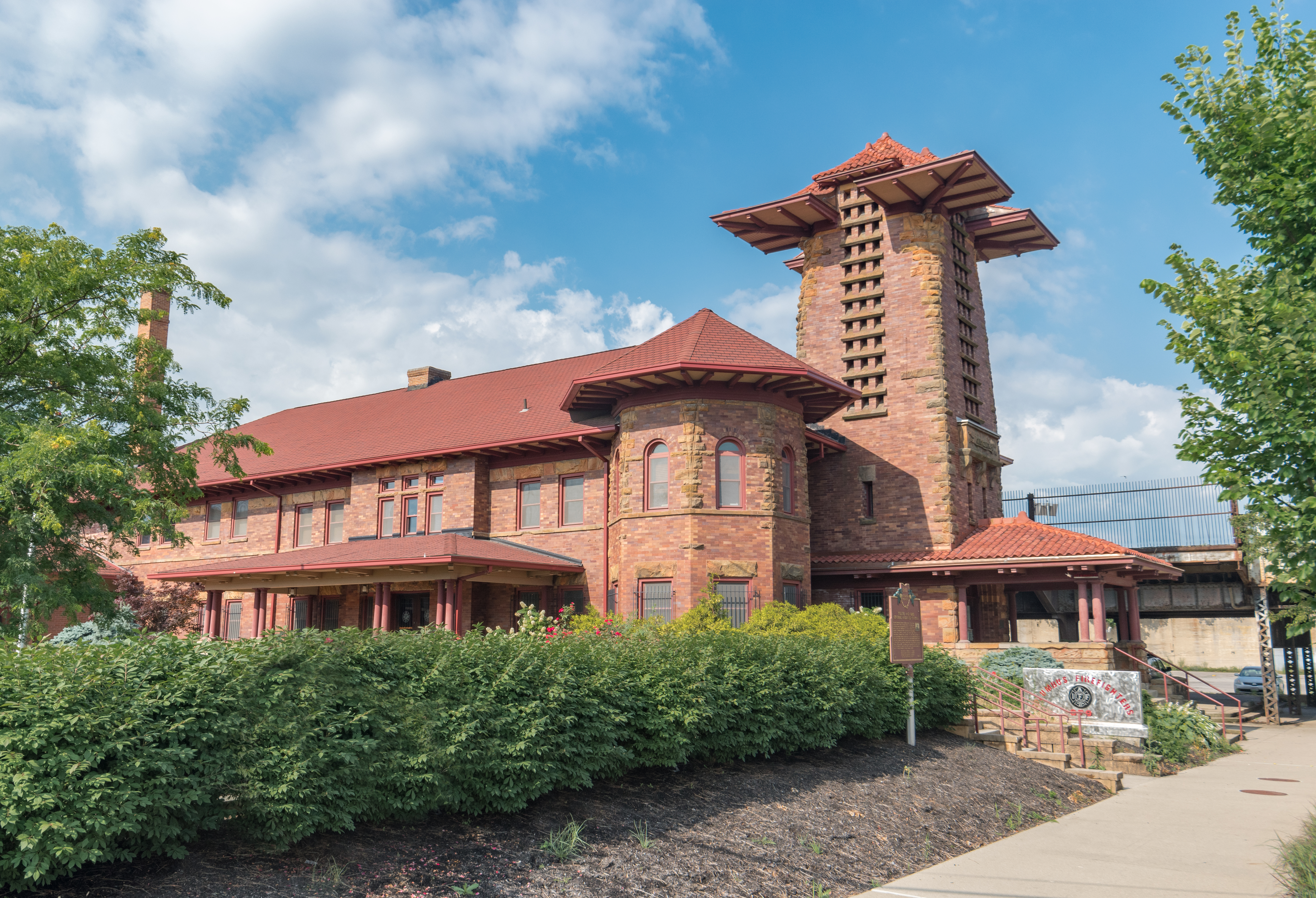

General information
- Location: 379 West Broad St., Columbus, Ohio
- Coordinates: 39.96054°N 83.01071°W
- Owner: IAFF Local No. 67
- Line: Norfolk Southern Dayton District Western Branch
- Platforms: 1 (elevated in 1909)

History
- Opened: April 18, 1896
- Closed: January 25, 1930

Former services
Preceding station	New York Central Railroad	Following station
Marysville toward Toledo	Toledo – Charleston	South Columbus toward Charleston

History
- Built: 1895–1896

Site notes
- Architect: Yost & Packard
- Architectural styles: Richardsonian Romanesque, Eclecticism
- Restored: 1910, 1978, 2007
- Restored by: Moody Nolan (2007)

U.S. National Register of Historic Places
- Designated: June 18, 1973
- Reference no.: 73001440
Location
- Interactive map highlighting the building's location

The Toledo and Ohio Central Railroad Station, today named Station 67, is a union meeting space and event hall located in Franklinton, near Downtown Columbus, Ohio. Built by the Toledo and Ohio Central Railroad from 1895 to 1896, it served as a passenger station until 1930. It served as an office and shelter for Volunteers of America from 1931 to 2003, and has been the headquarters of International Association of Fire Fighters Local 67, a firefighters' union, since 2007. The building was placed on the National Register of Historic Places in 1973. During its history, the building has experienced fires (in 1910 and 1975) and floods (in 1913 and 1957), though its relatively few owners have each made repairs and renovations to preserve the building's integrity. The building is the last remaining train station in Columbus.

The two-story structure was designed by prolific Columbus firm Yost & Packard in an eclectic style, with elements of Richardsonian Romanesque architecture and Japanese influences. It is made of variegated brick and sandstone with red tile roofs. Its central feature is a 3.5-story tower which once held clocks on three sides. The interior has seen modifications, though its main hall (the former passenger waiting room) still retains most of its original features.

The building's eclectic architecture has earned its appreciation as "one of the city's most whimsical and unusual buildings", and architect and Yale architecture school chair Paul Rudolph's favorite structure in the city.

== Attributes ==
The building is situated in the Franklinton neighborhood of Columbus. The structure abuts West Broad Street, the western portion of the primary east–west thoroughfare in Columbus, near Starling Street. The building is a short distance from Capitol Square in Downtown Columbus.

=== Architecture and exterior ===
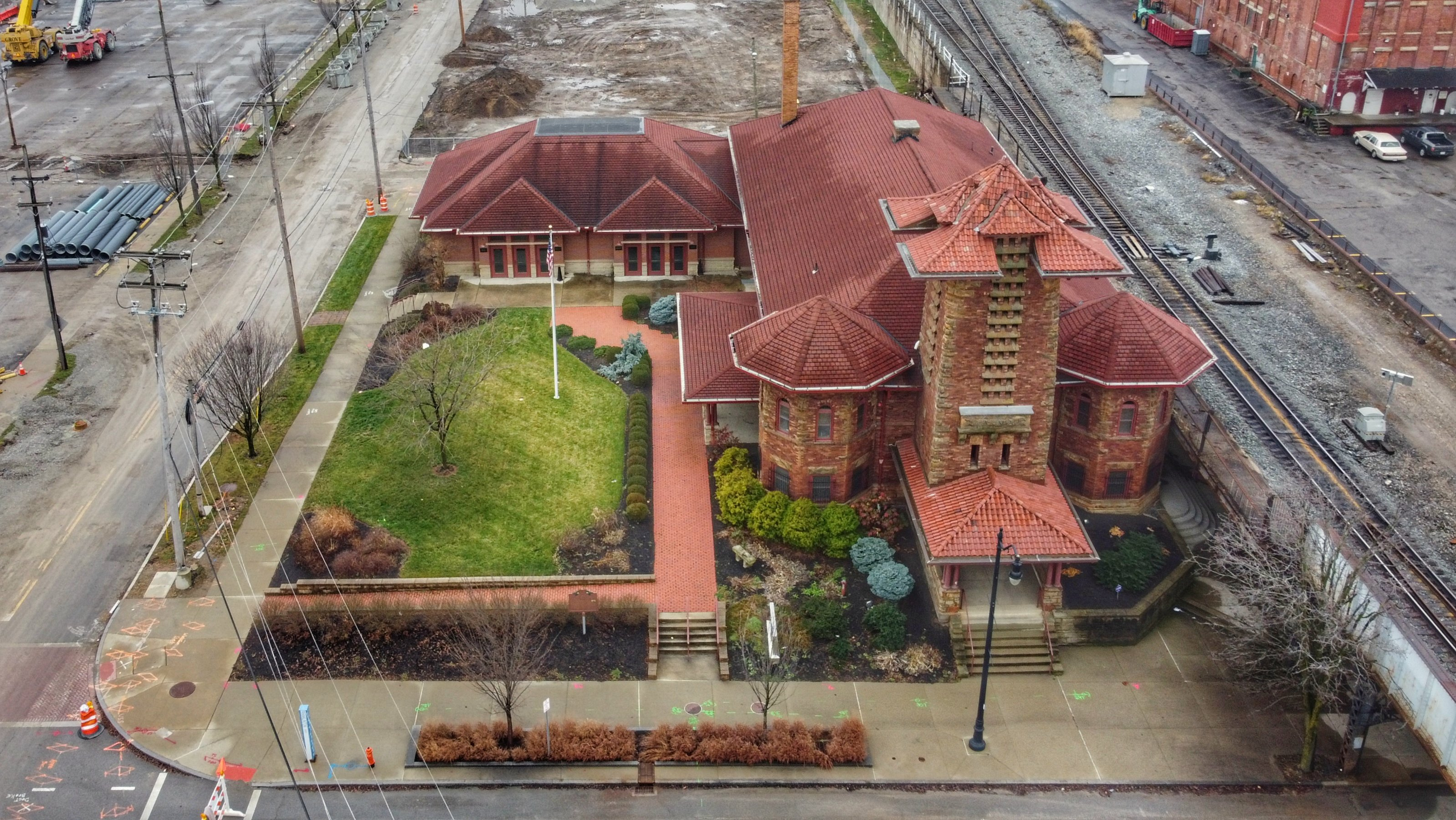
Aerial view of the station building and its addition, built in 2007

The railroad station was designed in an eclectic style by architects Joseph Warren Yost and Frank Packard, with elements of the Richardsonian Romanesque style. It is known for its "whimsical and unusual" architecture. The building was designed not only for its functions, but to surprise, delight, and impress its customers and the public. The Columbus Dispatch likened its style to other Columbus architecture, indicating it has a Kahiki-like charm.

The original two-story building measures approximately 40 by 70 feet (12 m × 21 m), four bays by six bays, and overall symmetrical in design. The building's principal exterior feature is a 3.5-story clocktower centered at its front. The tower tapers vertically up, decorated with brick and sandstone "grillwork", to its pagoda-style roof with broad flared eaves. The tower originally featured three black iron clock dials, which were placed out from the wall and illuminated by incandescent bulbs.

The clocktower structure is flanked by two shorter octagonal corner towers with arched windows at their second stories. Behind these towers is the remainder of the building, including a two-story barrel-vaulted waiting room.

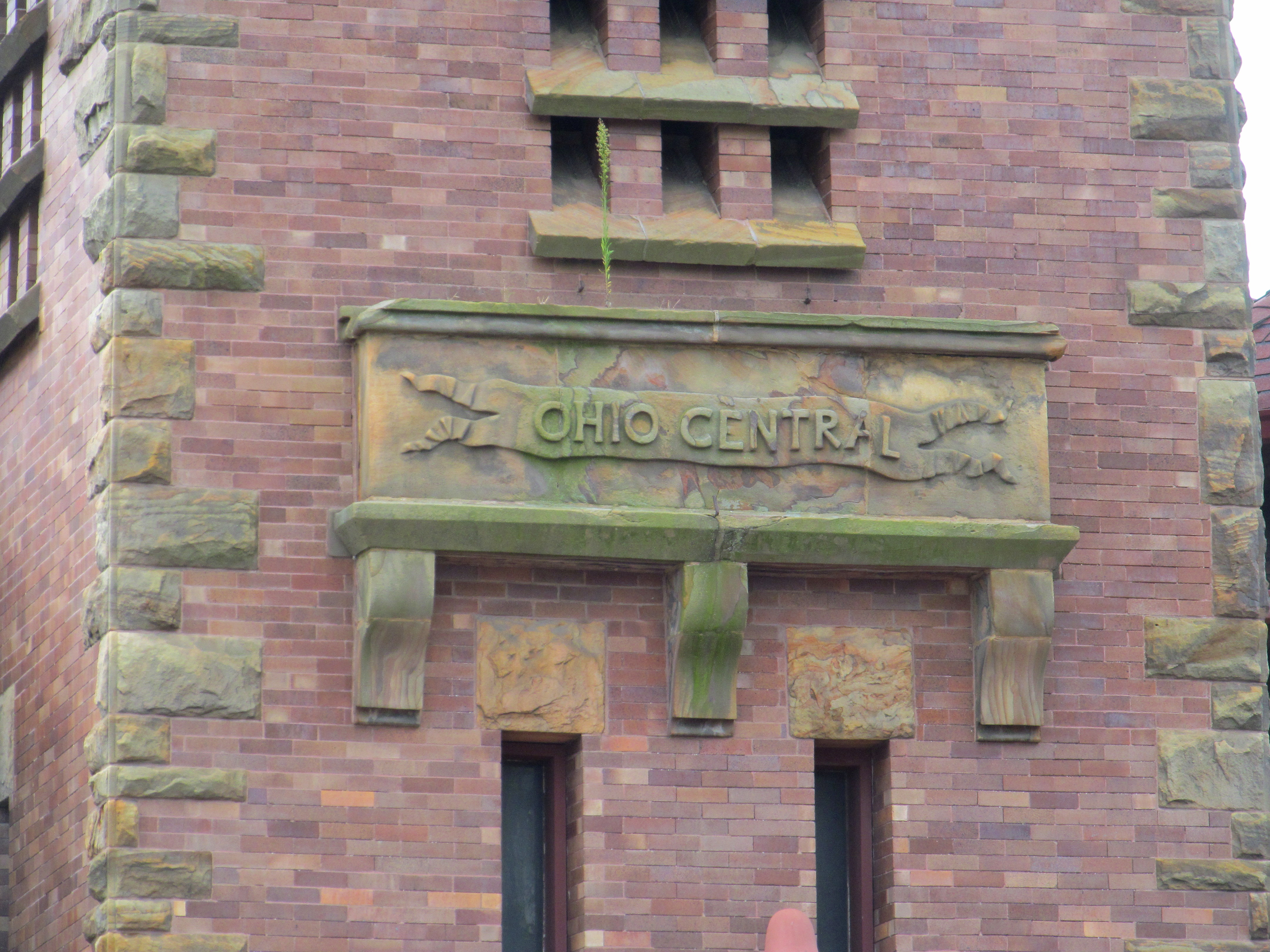
Railroad plaque

The building has variegated exterior walls of yellow, amber, and brown brick, with rough-cut and mottled red, yellow and brown sandstone lintels and quoins. The main structure has a hip roof pierced at the center by a low chimney. The building's roofs were originally all of red tile, lost in a 1975 fire; tile remains on the tower and entry porch. The building's entranceway has large front doors below a one-story columned, hipped-roof entrance porch. A stone plaque above the porch bears the emblem of the railroad: "Ohio Central". Above this is a vertical openwork brick pattern, reinforcing the structure's Japanese-influenced design.

The building's east side originally had a porte-cochère, removed to make way for a thrift store and restored in 2007. The building's west side originally had a small flight of stairs to its ground-level train shed and canopied platform.

The building's second floor lines up with a railroad viaduct, used as a loading platform. Passengers would enter through the front of the building, purchase tickets, and use a stairway to ascend to the second-floor platform to board trains.

A newer portion of the building, completed in 2007, occupies the southeast portion of the site. The addition has one story and 4,800 square feet (450 m^{2}), and was designed by local firm Moody Nolan. The southwest portion of the site is owned by the City of Columbus, which has a small park there.

=== Interior ===
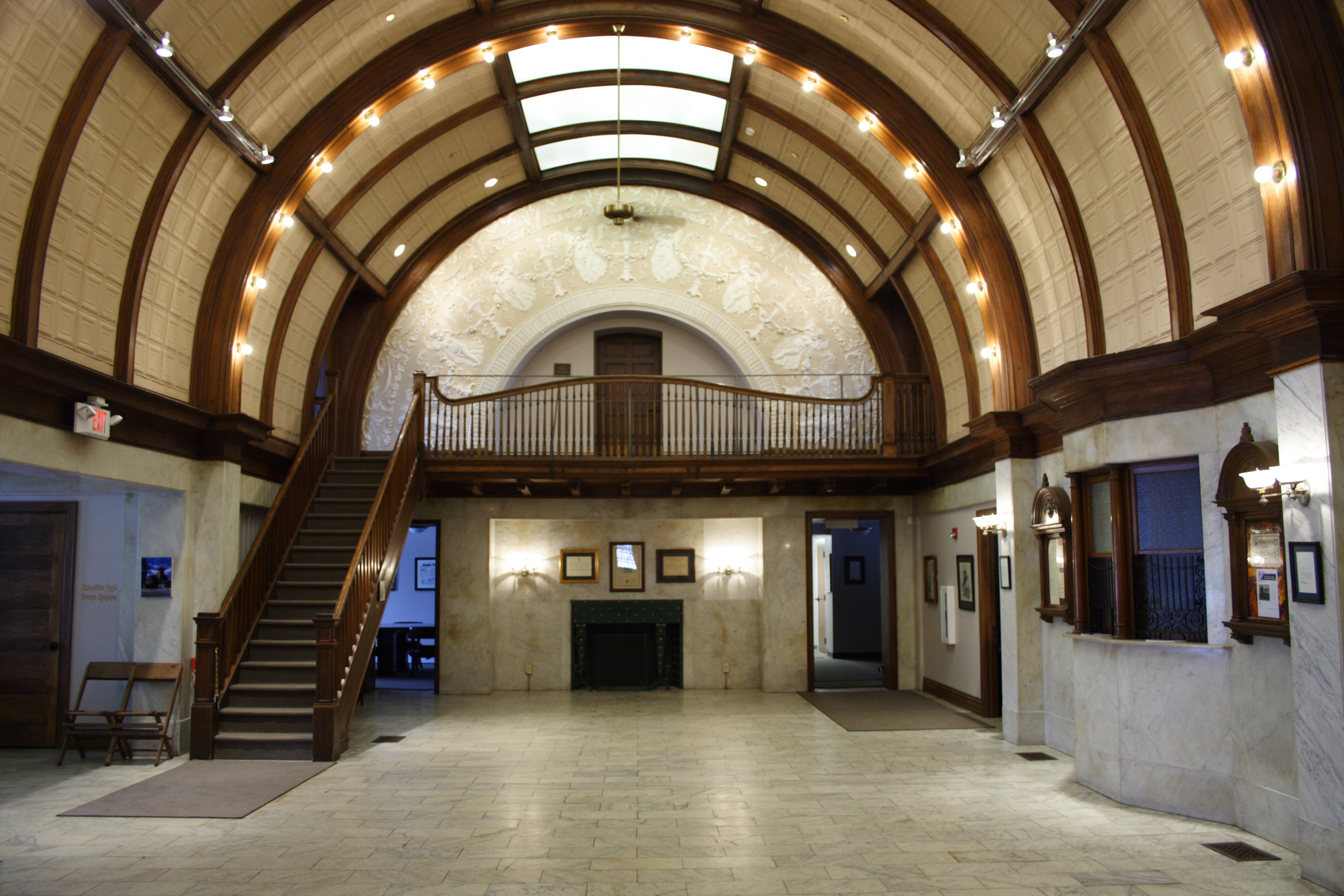
Former waiting room interior, 2009

The interior spaces are intricate and largely intact. The building's porch leads into a vestibule, and from there into the former passenger waiting room, which resembles Union Station in St. Louis, Missouri, built in 1894. The 30-by-60-foot (9.1 m × 18.3 m) room, making up most of the interior, has mahogany woodwork and an Italian marble floor. The ceiling is barrel-vaulted with wooden ribs and pressed sheet metal panels. Elaborate plaster bas-reliefs of cherubs are situated at each end of the room. The original ticket office and ticket window are at the west side of the room. The south end of the room features a large log fireplace with black andirons and a black iron hood, beneath a broad balcony. The room was originally furnished with long wooden benches and potted plants. A brass plaque in the room shows the high water mark from the Great Flood of 1913.

The first-floor level also originally contained a newsstand, smoking room, ladies' rooms, a baggage room at the rear, and lookout spaces within the front corner towers. The basement contained a gymnasium, locker room, bathroom, plunge bath, a fuel room, and a heater room. Some of these rooms in the building have been modernized, and some of its rooms were converted into dormitories. The central tower of the building has no rooms.

== History ==
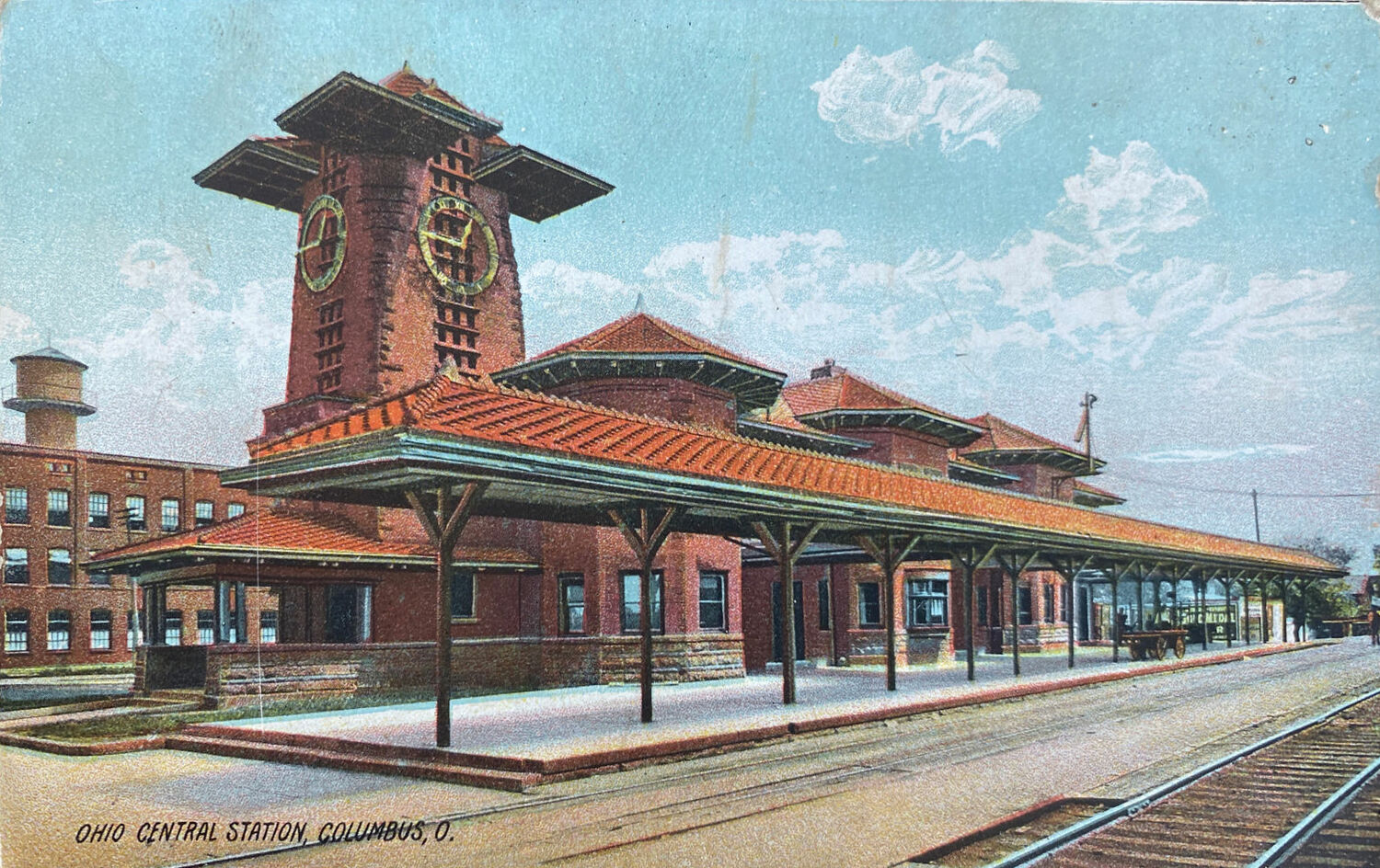
As originally built, c. 1909

The Toledo and Ohio Central Railroad built the station beginning in 1895, intending it as a display of the talents of architects Joseph Warren Yost and Frank L. Packard and of the railroad's prosperity. An 1896 source stated the desire to make the station impressive and attractive was to prevent losing business, as the Ohio Central Lines would automatically by withdrawing from Union Station. Yost & Packard, a Columbus-based firm, created much of the architectural character of the city, and the station was seen as one of their most creative designs. The tracks were originally at ground level on the west side of the building. The distinctive Macklin Hotel, since demolished, was located across the tracks. Yost and Packard reportedly modeled the station after the hotel's three pagoda-style towers. The firm Gutheil & Schneider was the building's general contractor.

The building opened on April 18, 1896, in an event with an orchestra. The station was decorated with plants, palms, and cut flowers. The first train stopped at the new station two days later. The opening was the first break from Columbus's Union Station, which had served city travelers since 1851. In May 1896, the station's clocktower was outfitted with its clock, an 1,800-lb., four-dial clock with gilt numerals, to be visible to "most of the west side".

In 1909, enough automobile traffic required the railroad elevate its tracks to span above Broad Street. Work began in March of that year south of the station. A ramp was built to bring passengers and goods to and from the new viaduct, and the building's porte-cochère was removed. Broad Street was excavated and lowered about four feet to accommodate traffic under the new underpasses. The relatively new station was proposed to be demolished around this time, to create a more modern structure that would be level with the new elevated tracks.

In 1910, the station survived a heavily damaging fire, reportedly "practically destroyed". The fire was believed to have started from defective wiring in a cupola above the engineer's room, and to have smoldered for about an hour before it was first spotted. A freight train had derailed around this time, blocking Broad Street for about 20 minutes, forcing west side companies to detour. Meanwhile, fire engines from east of the station arrived and found too poor of water pressure to prevent the fire from spreading. The damage was at least partially covered by insurance; all of the station's tickets and records were also lost.

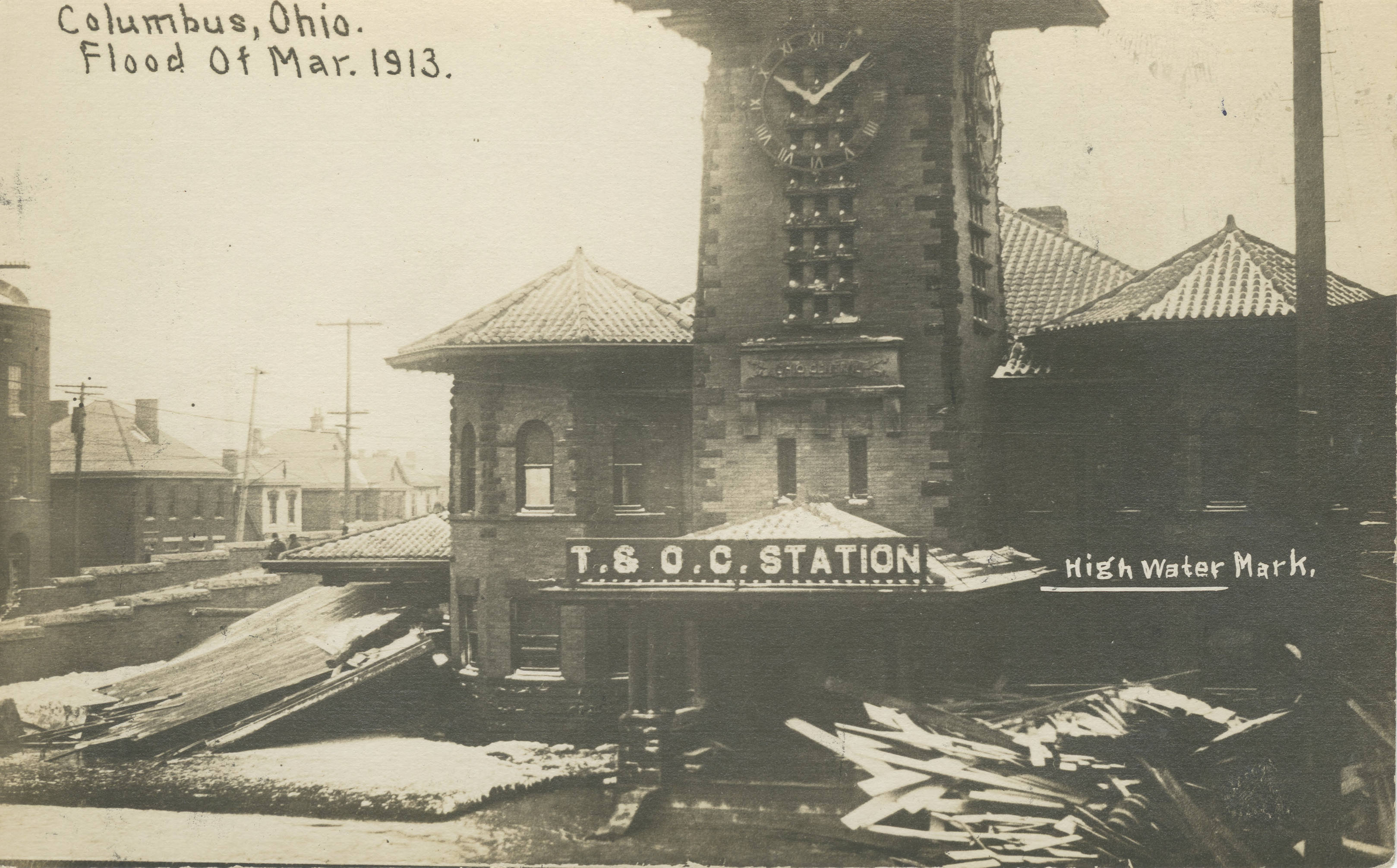
The building after the Great Flood of 1913; high water mark labeled

Three years later, the building survived the Great Flood of 1913. In the late 1920s, service moved to the larger Union Station and the station was abandoned. Ohio Central division trains began operating out of Union Station on January 26, 1930.

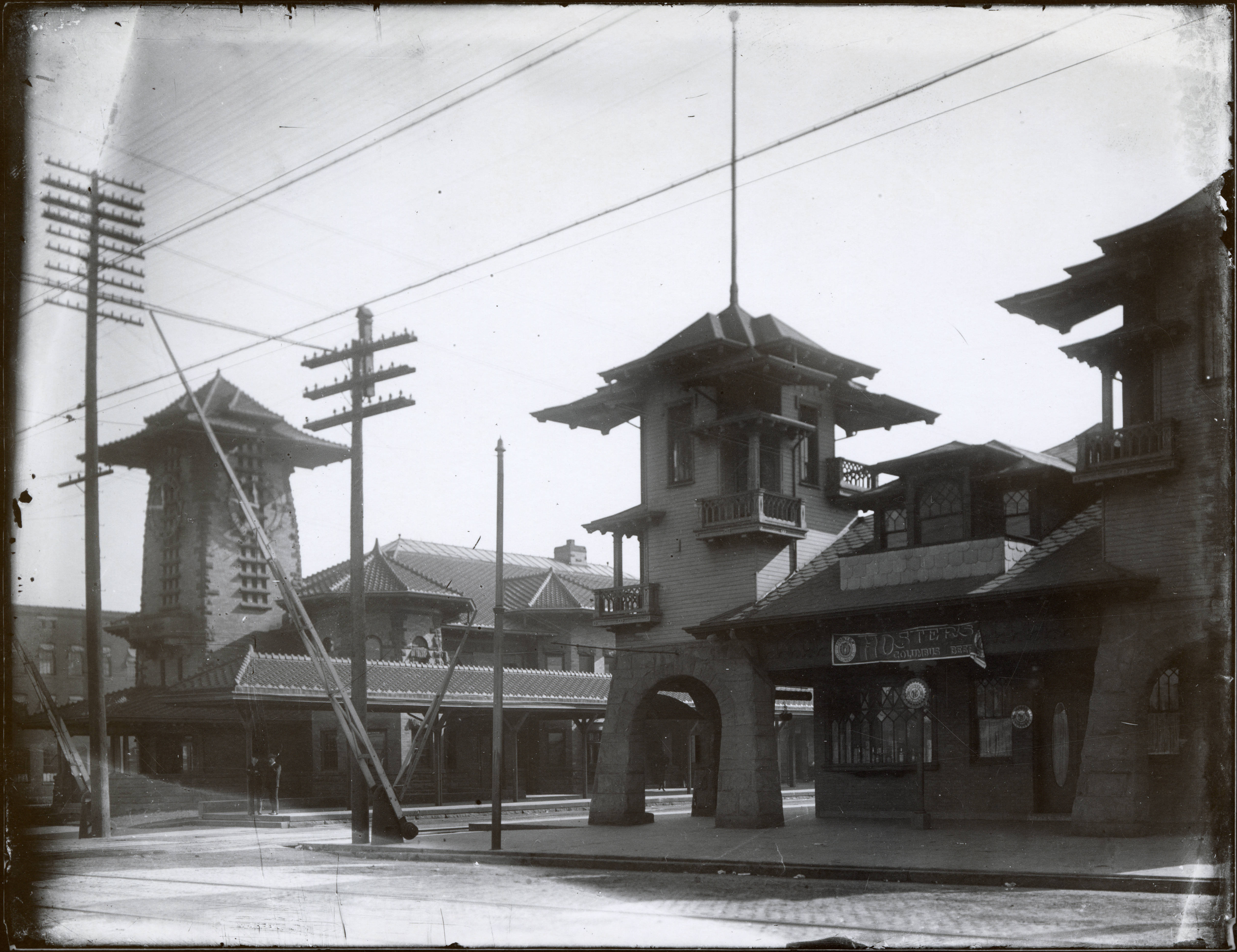
The station (left) and the Macklin Hotel (right)

The next year, Volunteers of America (VOA) purchased the building. Beginning on July 6, 1931, the organization began using it as office space and shelter, and used the waiting room as a banquet hall for holiday dinners, including on Easter, Thanksgiving, and Christmas. The VOA dedicated a new building on the property, to the immediate east of the former station, on April 12, 1942. The Macklin Hotel at 387 West Broad Street (commonly known as the T. &. O. C. Restaurant due to its proximity to the station) was demolished in 1955. The building had seen numerous occupants, including the Keystone Restaurant, the Holycross wartime market, Val Stiegerald's restaurant, barber, and poolroom, and as the Macklin Cafe. Another flood, in 1957, damaged the train station building, flooding into it. The station was added to the National Register of Historic Places in 1973.

The station building suffered a fire in January 1975. The fire destroyed the red tile roof and much of the second floor. The fire drew the VOA to sponsor a complete restoration of the building in 1978. Since the renovation, the waiting room skylight has been artificially lit. In 1995, the VOA celebrated the building's centennial with a free public event including tours, a program, and discussions.

The organization moved out of the building in 2003, to a location on East Broad Street. In the same year, the VOA sold the building and their thrift store next-door to the City of Columbus, which boarded up the building and kept it vacant for the next three years while it sought new uses for the structure. The Columbus Historical Society proposed opening its first museum in the building, showcasing the city's history, though it couldn't find partner tenants or $2.5 million to purchase and renovate the building. Other proposals included a restaurant and a Harley-Davidson motorcycle showroom.

In 2007, International Association of Fire Fighters Local No. 67 bought and restored the station building for use as their offices and meeting hall. One condition the union had for purchasing was the demolition of the thrift store building, which Columbus approved plans to demolish. The union planned for up to $2.5 million to renovate and expand the building, including an addition to take up a third of the lot occupied by the store. The change opened up views of the station as it was intended to be seen.

Norfolk Southern Railroad freight trains continue to use the elevated tracks.

Gallery

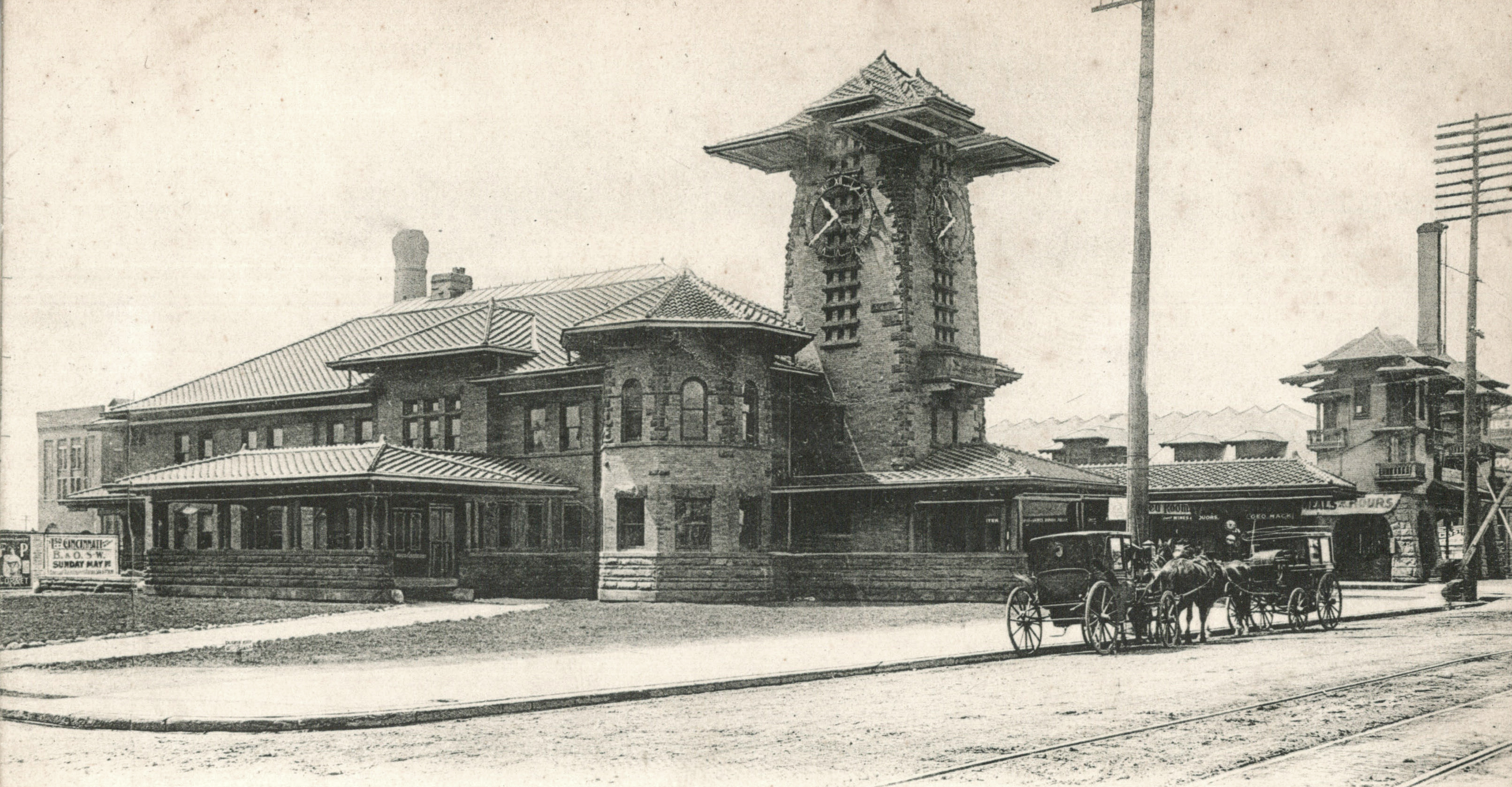
The station as originally built

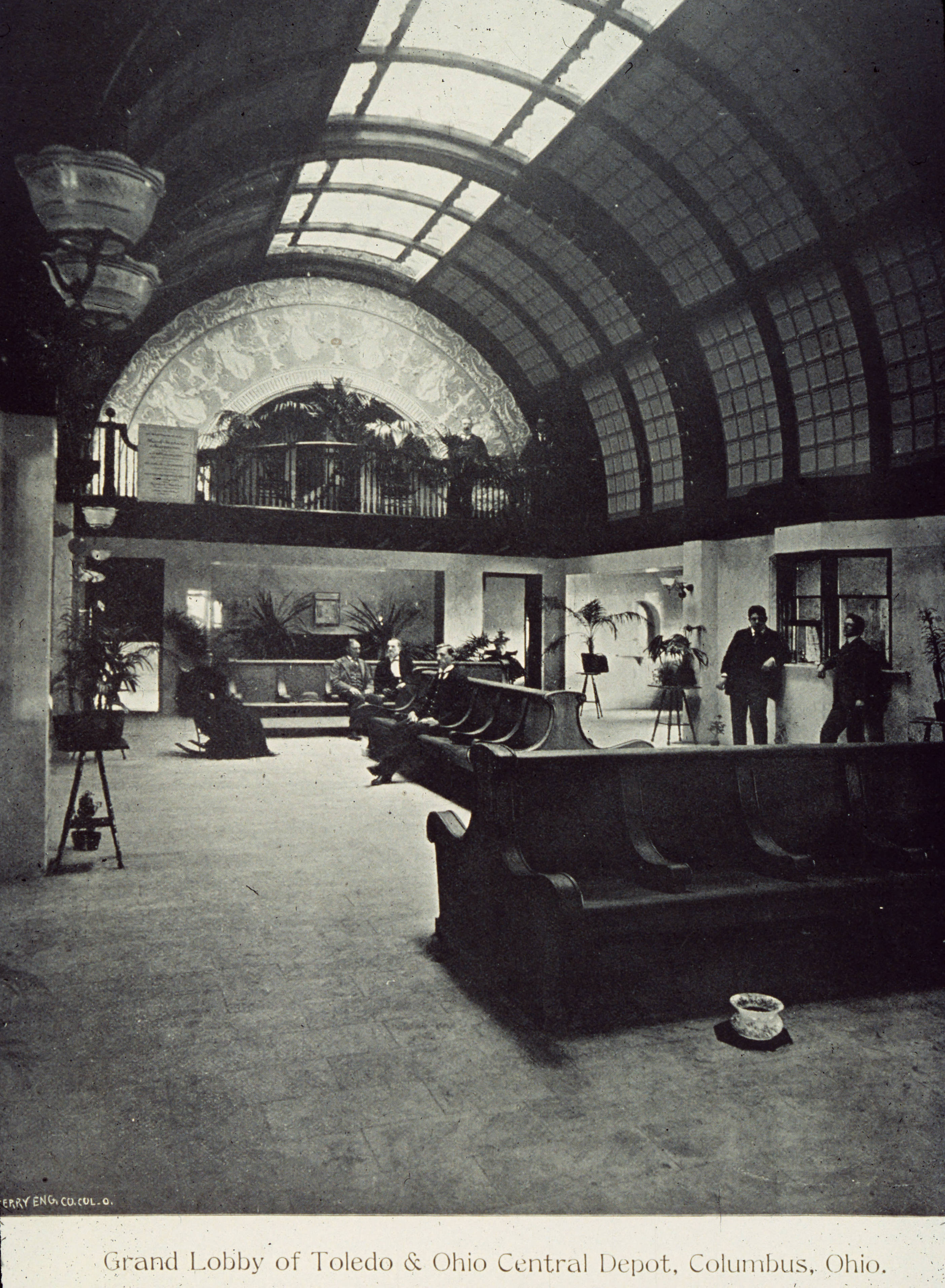
The passenger waiting room in 1896

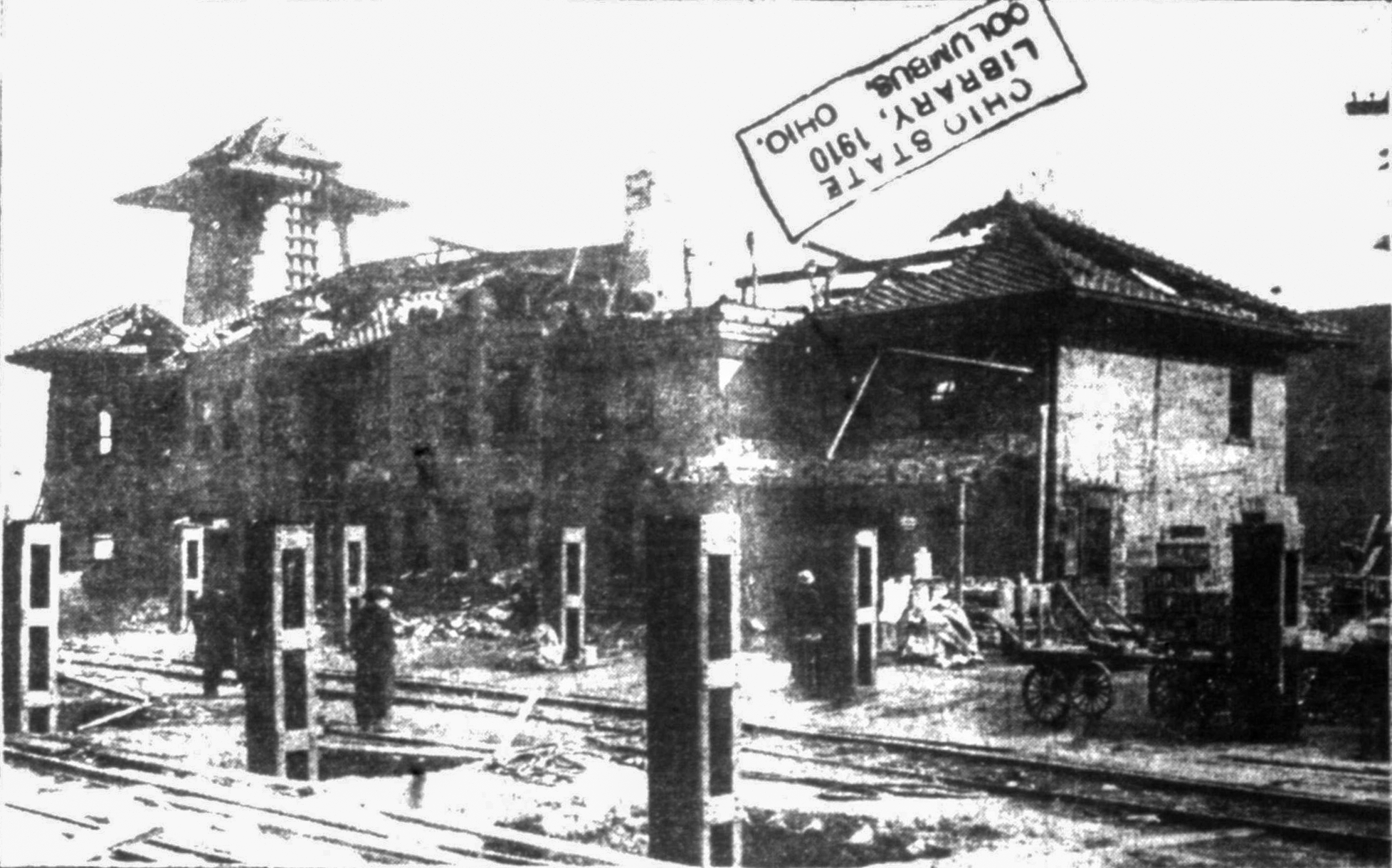
Ruins after the 1910 fire

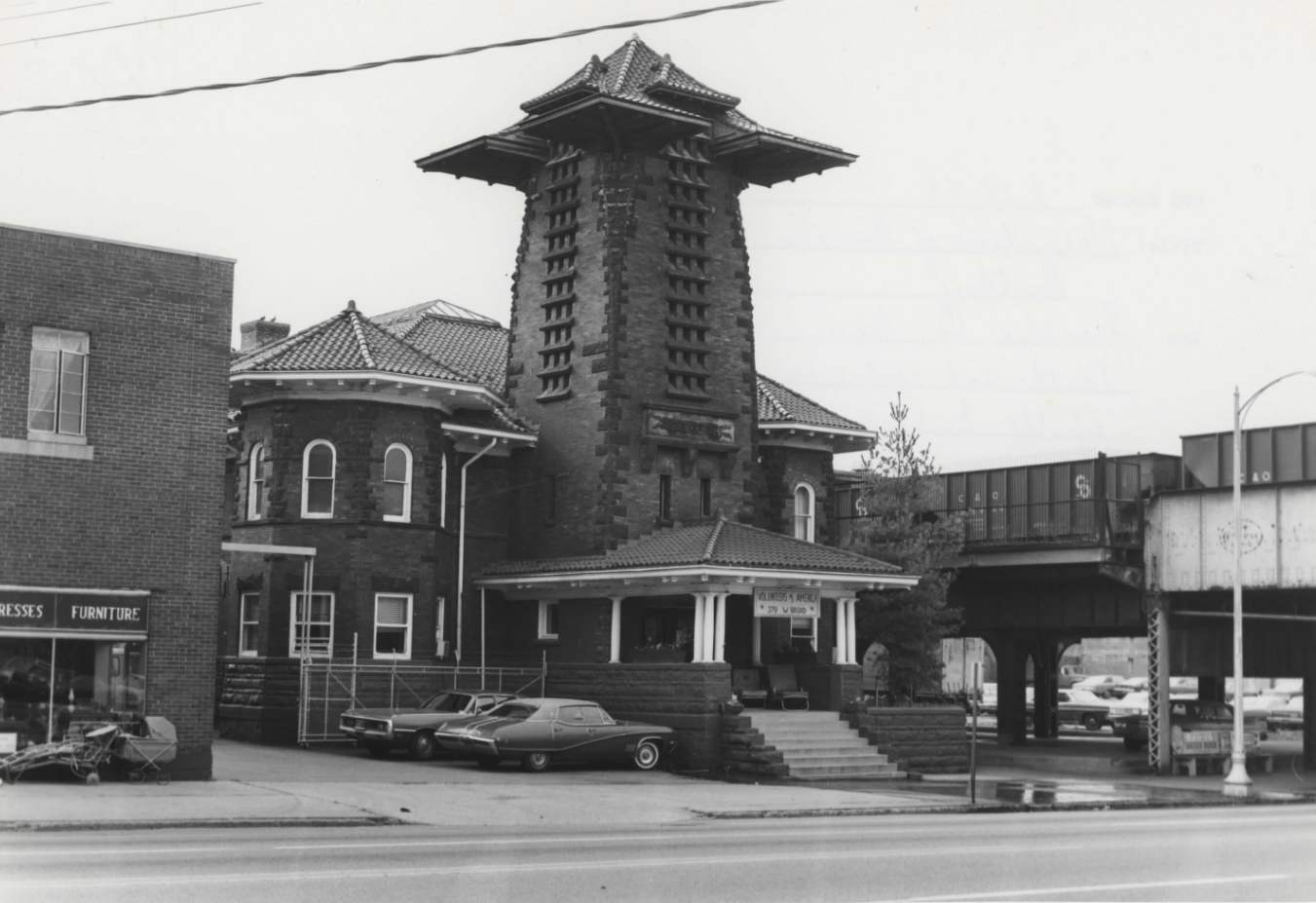
As the Volunteers of America, 1973

== Reputation ==
The building's eclectic architecture has earned its appreciation as "one of the city's most whimsical and unusual buildings". In 1978, during the VOA's ownership, renowned architect Paul Rudolph visited the city and told architects at a meeting of the local chapter of the American Institute of Architects that the building was his favorite in Columbus. Due to the building's age and use housing an organization helping the homeless, the structure was not seen around that time as a distinctive structure.

At its opening, The Columbus Dispatch lauded it as magnificent, and one of the finest stations in the United States. The building has attracted architecture enthusiasts, and it was the first stop on a Broad Street tour guide of Frank Packard-designed buildings.

== See also ==
- Circus House, built in the same year and similar style by the architects
- National Register of Historic Places listings in Columbus, Ohio
- Public transit in Columbus, Ohio
- Social services and homelessness in Columbus, Ohio
