= North Market =

Shopping mall in Columbus, Ohio

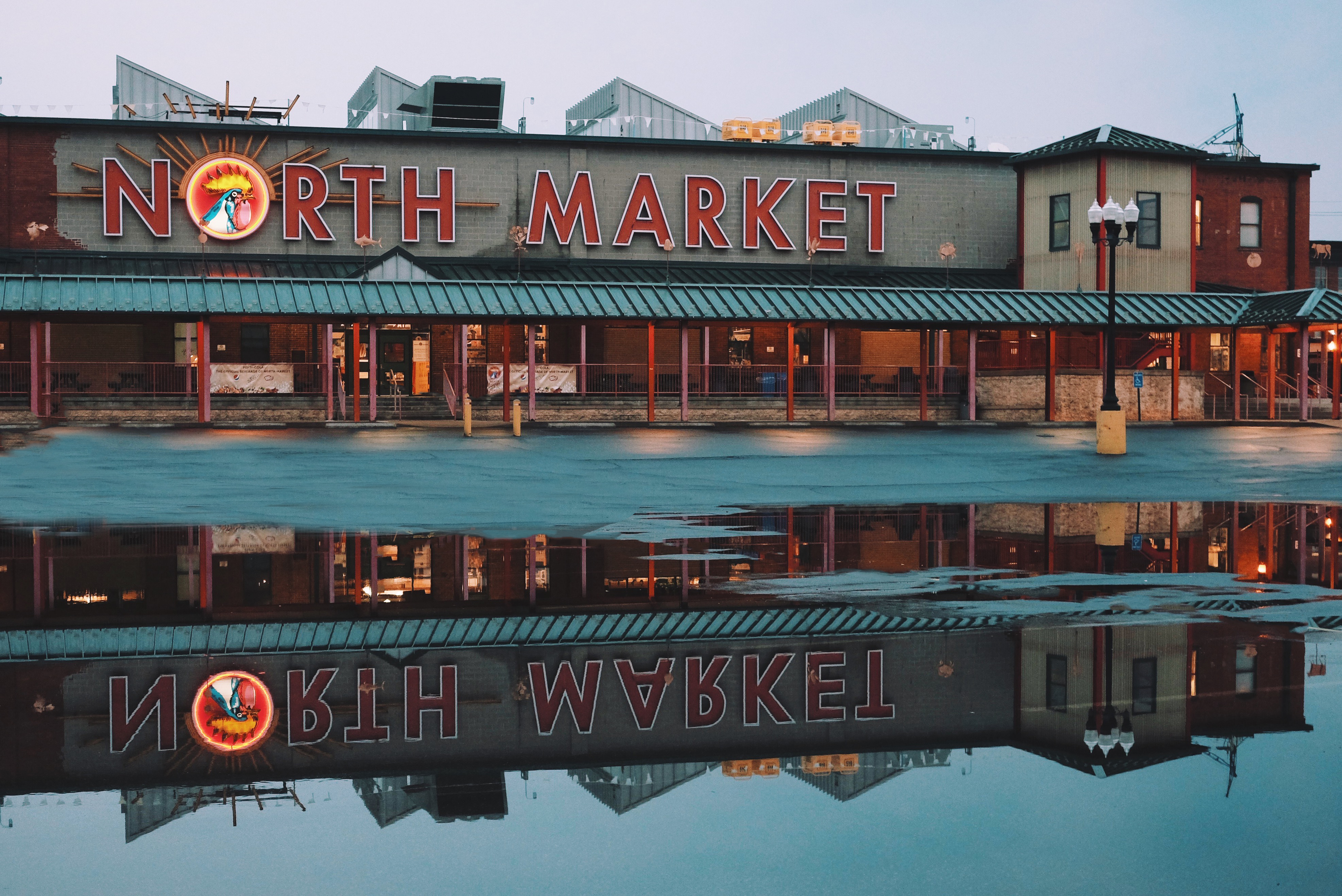
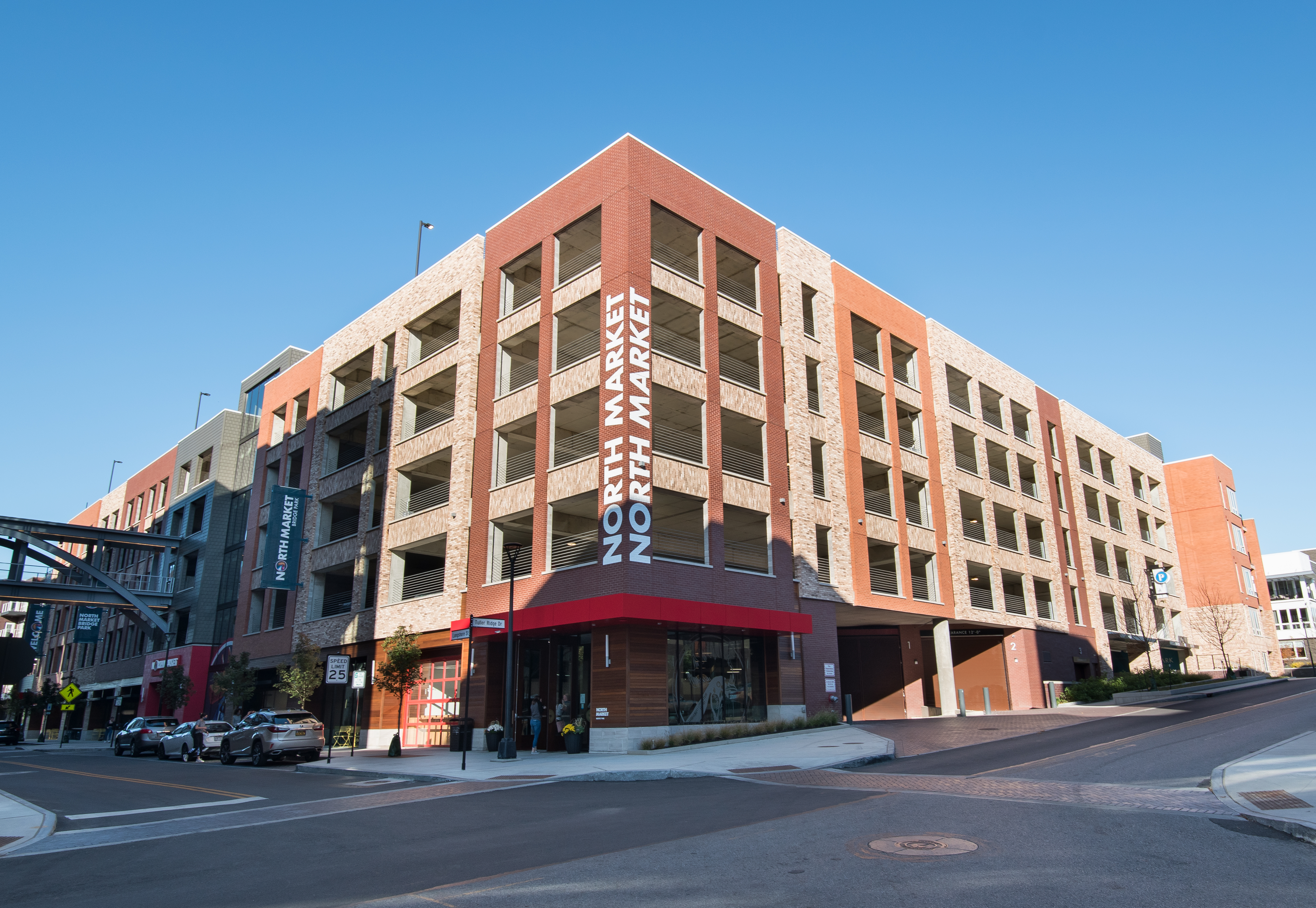
- The Columbus (top) and Dublin (bottom) North Market locations
- Market locations in Columbus and Dublin
- Coordinates: 39°58′19″N 83°00′16″W, 40.104680°N 83.109798°W
- Address: 59 Spruce St (Columbus); 6750 Longshore St (Dublin)
- Opened: 1876 (first market house); 1995 (current downtown market); 2020 (Dublin market)
- Manager: North Market Development Authority
- Public transit: Columbus: multiple routes: 1, 2, 5, 13, 72, 74, 102, AirConnect, Night Owl; Dublin: 33
- Website: northmarket.org
- 460-488 North Park Street Warehouse
- U.S. Historic district – Contributing property
- Columbus Register of Historic Properties
- Part of: North Market Historic District (National and Columbus Registers) 82001460, CR-21

Significant dates
- Designated CP: December 30, 1982
- Designated CRHP: September 19, 1983

North Market is a food hall and public market in Columbus, Ohio. The Downtown Columbus market was established in 1876, and was the second of four founded in Columbus. The market is managed by the non-profit North Market Development Authority (NDMA), which also manages North Market Bridge Park, a market in Dublin, Ohio.

The downtown market hosts about 35 vendors. About one third of these sell ready-to-eat foods, one third sell specialty goods, and the remaining portion sell produce, flowers, meat and fish, cookware, and gifts. The NDMA also hosts a weekly farmer's market from June to October outside the market building.

The Dublin market, completed in 2020, was designed to be more modern than the downtown location. The new market has 30,000 sq ft (2,800 m^{2}) of space, two-thirds of which is for the public. The market has 15 vendors, with a total capacity of 19.

== History ==
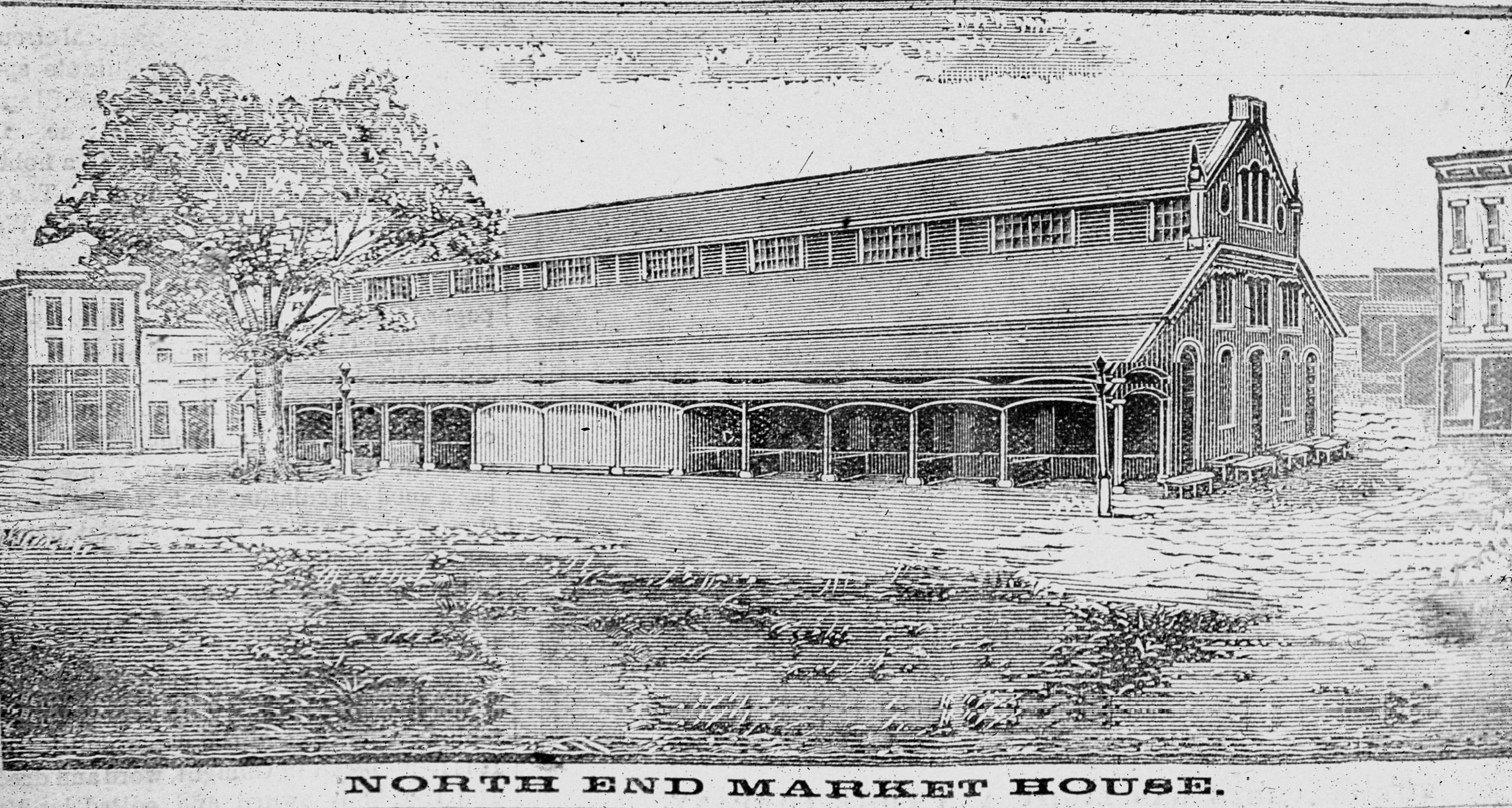
North End Market House (1876-1948)

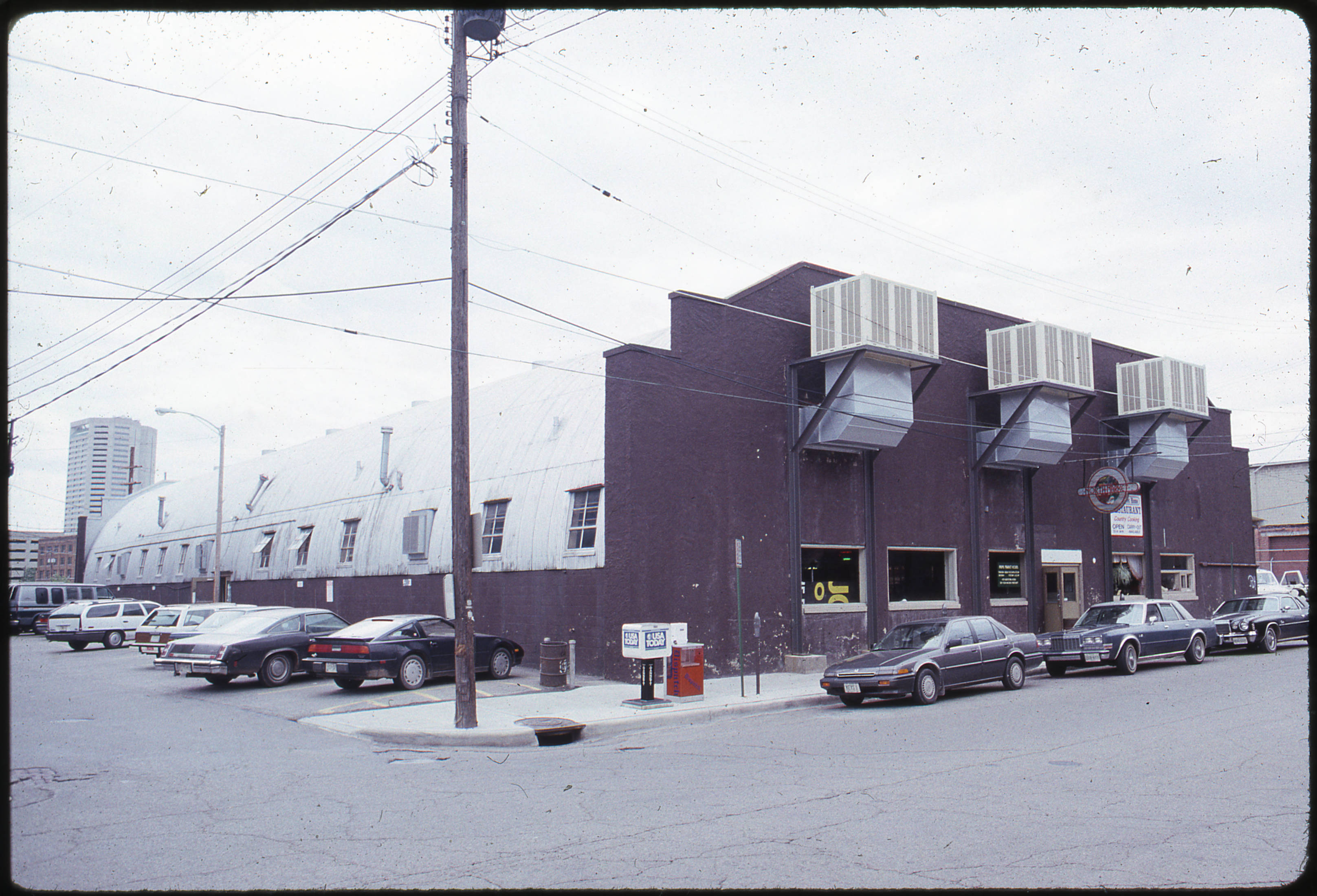
The second North Market (1948-1995)

From 1813 to 1873, the current location of the North Market housed a cemetery known as the North Graveyard. After negotiations with city developers, grave removal and relocation began in 1872. In 1876, a market house as well as other small businesses and restaurants were built on the land. This public space at 29 Spruce Street became the North Market. The North Market was the second of four public markets built throughout the city (North, East, West and Central) and is the only remaining public market at its original site.

The Central Market, built in 1850 at Town and Fourth Streets as a combination City Hall and public market, was torn down in 1966 to make way for urban renewal and today is the location of Columbus's Greyhound bus station. The building once housing the West Market on South Gift Street is now a Boys and Girls Club. The East Market at Mt. Vernon and Miami Avenues was destroyed by fire in 1947. A new East Market opened in the Franklin Park neighborhood in 2022.

In 1948, almost one year to the day of the fire at the East Market, the same tragedy struck North Market (or North End Market as it was then called). The City of Columbus decided not to rebuild the market but merchants quickly pooled their funds to purchase a war surplus Quonset hut to house North Market. Though the merchants bought the building, the city retained ownership of the Market property.

The vitality of the Market began to wane post World War II as population shifted from the city to the suburbs and the development of supermarkets. The building of the Ohio Center and the temporary closing of High Street in the late 1970s caused the Market to hit rock bottom. Attempts to revive the once thriving institution were thwarted by the physical and mechanical limitations of the Quonset hut. The Market was operating on a month-to-month lease with the city. The future was far from secure.

During the 1980s a national, growing recognition of public markets emerged. This enabled Columbus residents to rediscover their market. That idea, along with the fear that the city would tear down the Market to develop a parking lot for the planned Greater Columbus Convention Center, drove the creation of the North Market Development Authority (NMDA). This not-for-profit group of shoppers and merchants was established to “preserve and promote the traditional and cultural aspects of the historic North Market."

In 1988, NMDA led the market's recovery by negotiating a long-term lease with the city, effectively eliminating the threat of demolition. In 1989, the NMDA assumed daily operations of the market.

The initial staff of a Market Master and Executive Director, plus volunteer board members, the NMDA focused on the possibility of rehabilitating the Quonset hut. Physically bursting at the seams and on its last legs, the building was financially impractical to renovate. Even if the costly and extensive repairs were made, the Market would still be housed in a cramped Quonset hut, rather than a light, clean, functional marketplace.

The NMDA spearheaded a capital campaign to finance building renovations. The market's new home would be 60 percent larger than the Quonset hut with room for new merchants. After raising $5 million, the NMDA began construction in January 1995. In November 1995, the new North Market opened with 25 merchants. The market house is a former warehouse of the Advance Thresher Company, built in 1915 and part of the North Market Historic District.

North Market has been under the leadership of Executive Director Rick Harrison Wolfe since mid-2013.

North Market's bell, which was used in the first North Market building, is housed in a decorative structure on the northeast corner of the market parking lot. The bell had survived the market's 1948 fire; it fell and was recovered, and had been stored in the market's basement. Local donations funded its outdoor installation in 2014.

The market owners opened a second location, in Dublin, Ohio, on November 5, 2020.

== Merchant Building ==
May 2022 rendering of the completed tower beside North Market

The Merchant Building, formerly North Market Tower, is a proposed mixed-use tower being developed on the site of the downtown market's parking lot. The site was the location of the first two North Market halls. The city held an architectural design contest for a skyscraper in 2016. Schooley Caldwell, a Columbus-based firm, was selected, which added NBBJ to the project. The project is still in development, and is under review by the city's Historic Resources Commission and was approved by its Downtown Commission in December 2021. Construction began in late 2022.

== Gallery ==
Columbus market

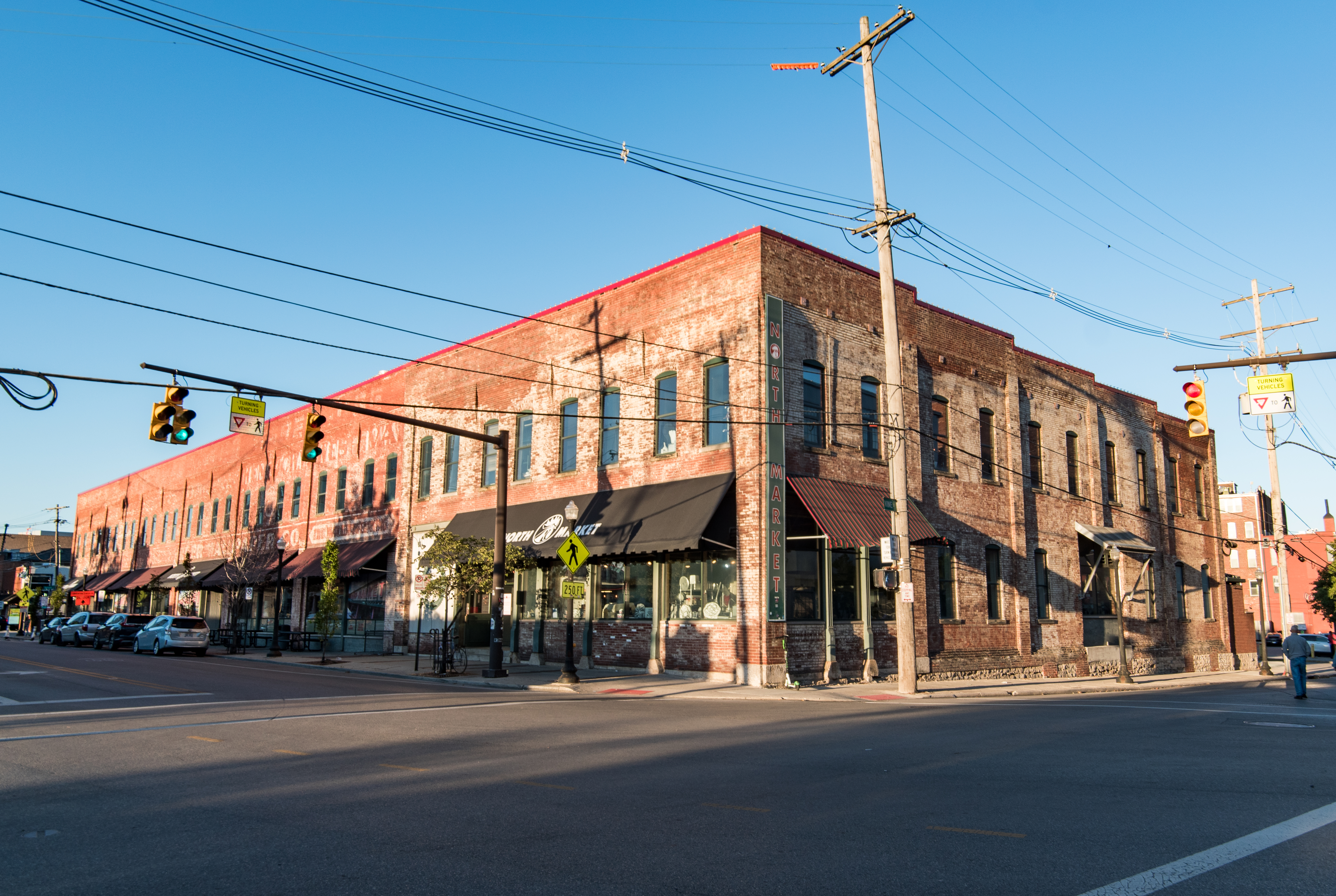
Park and Vine Street facades

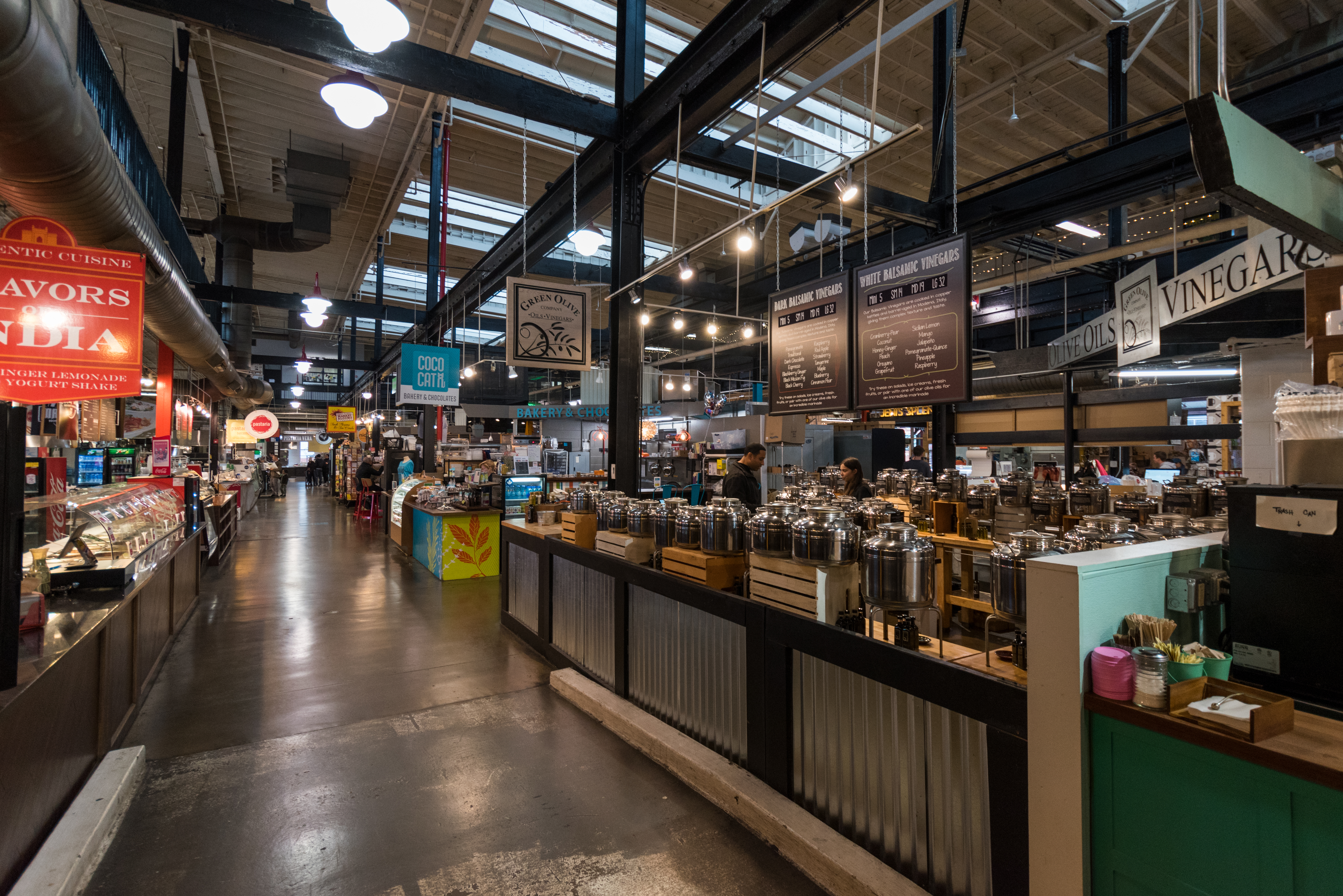
First floor foodstands

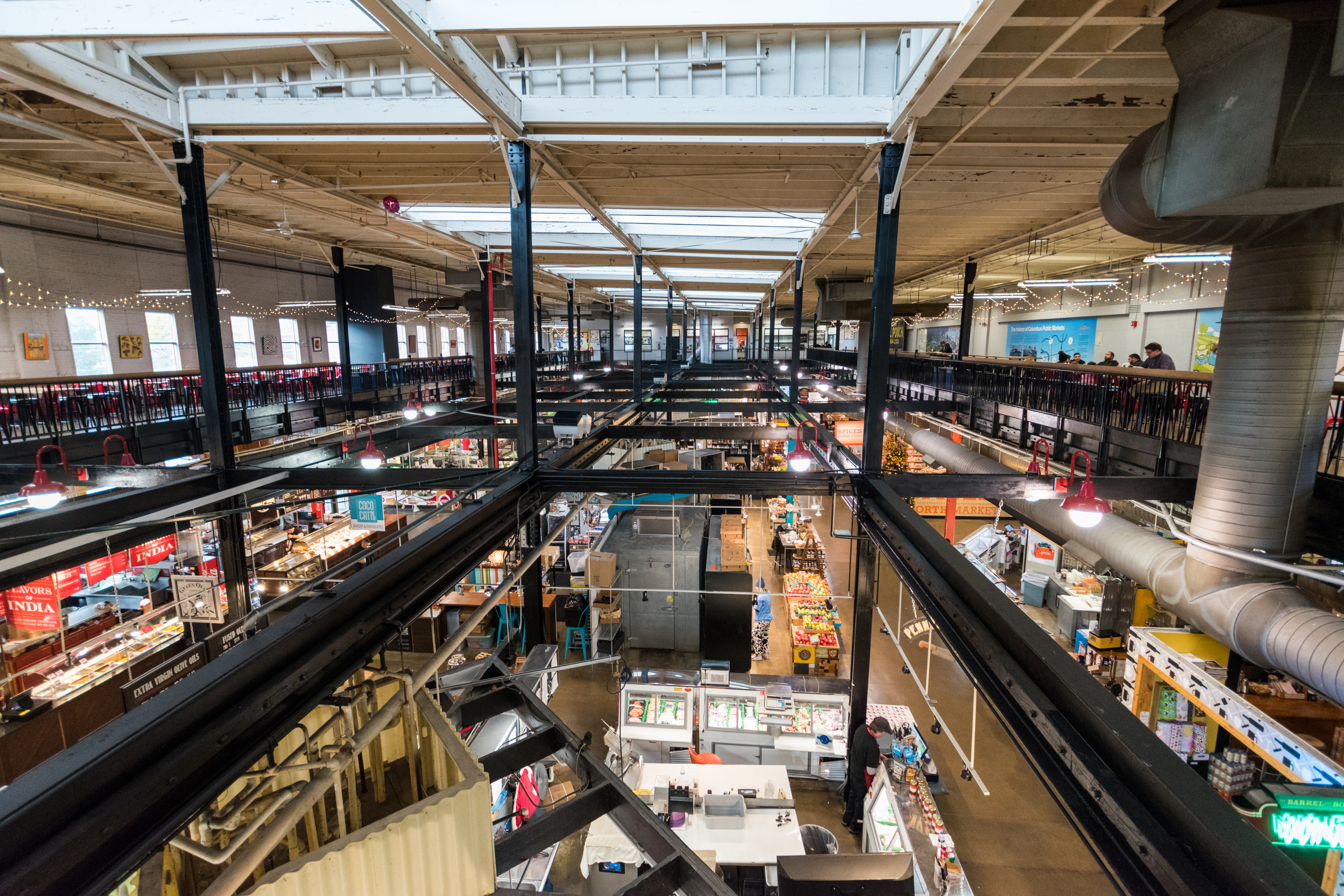
Mezzanine level

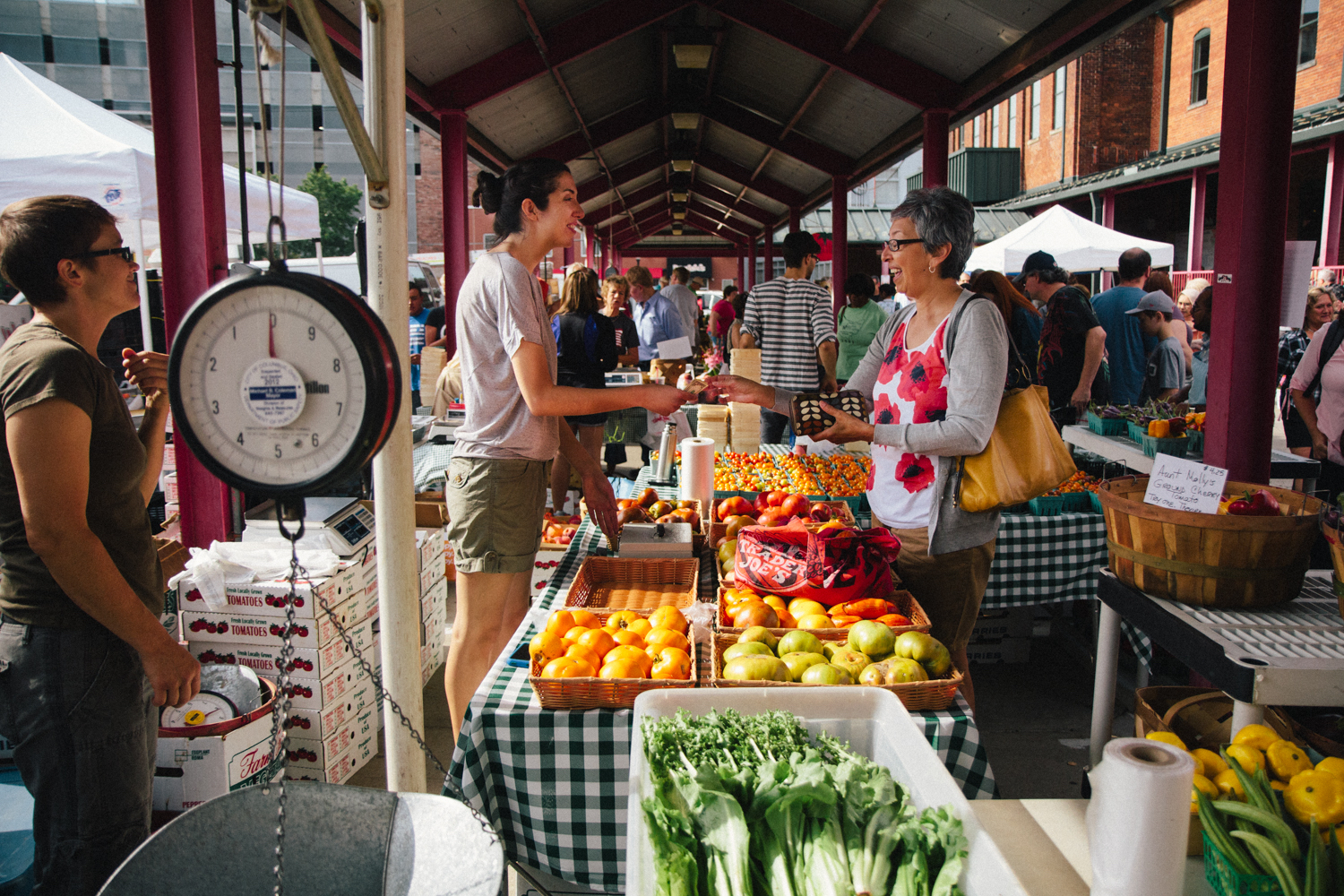
Farmer's market

Dublin market

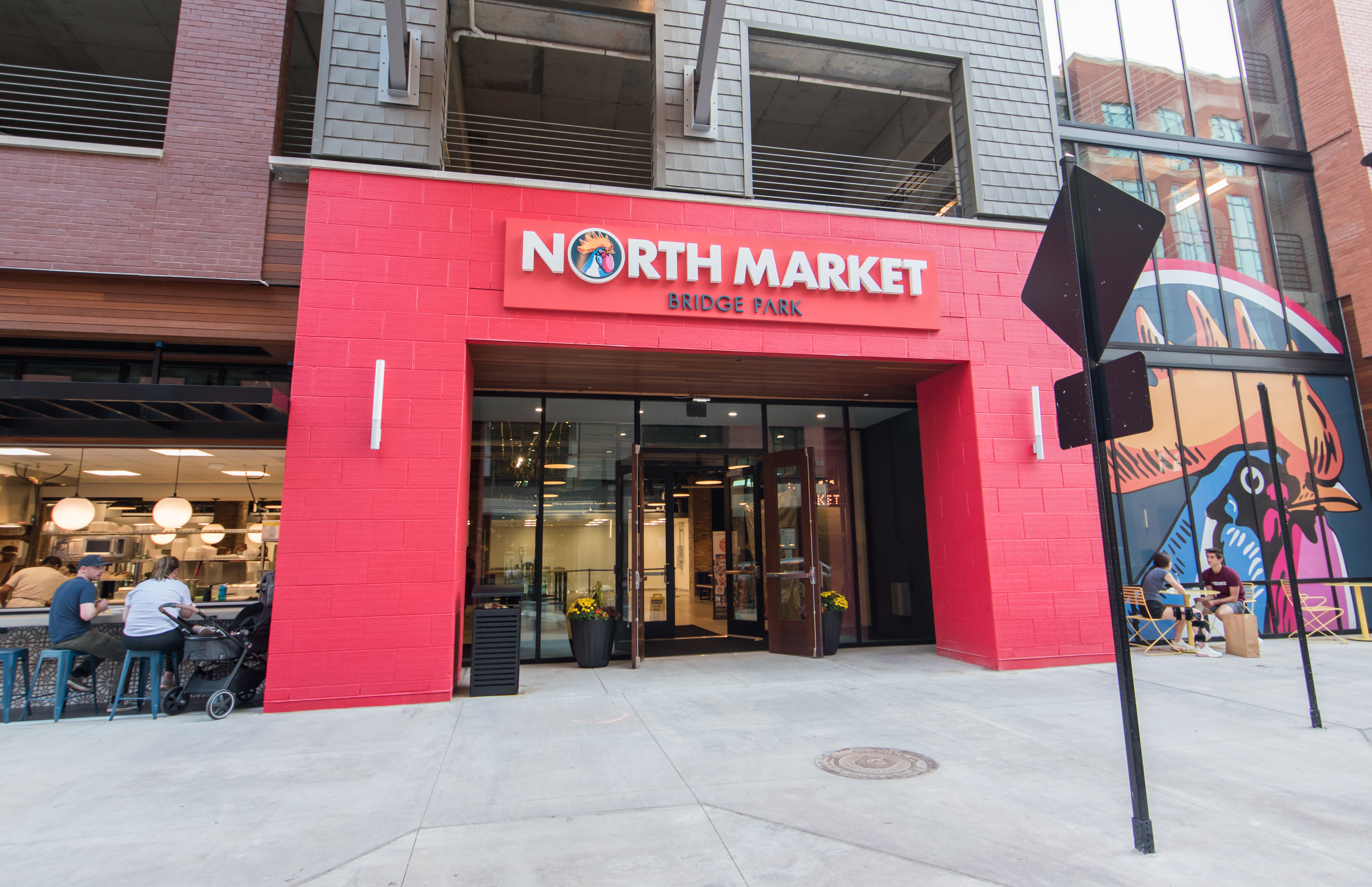
Main entrance

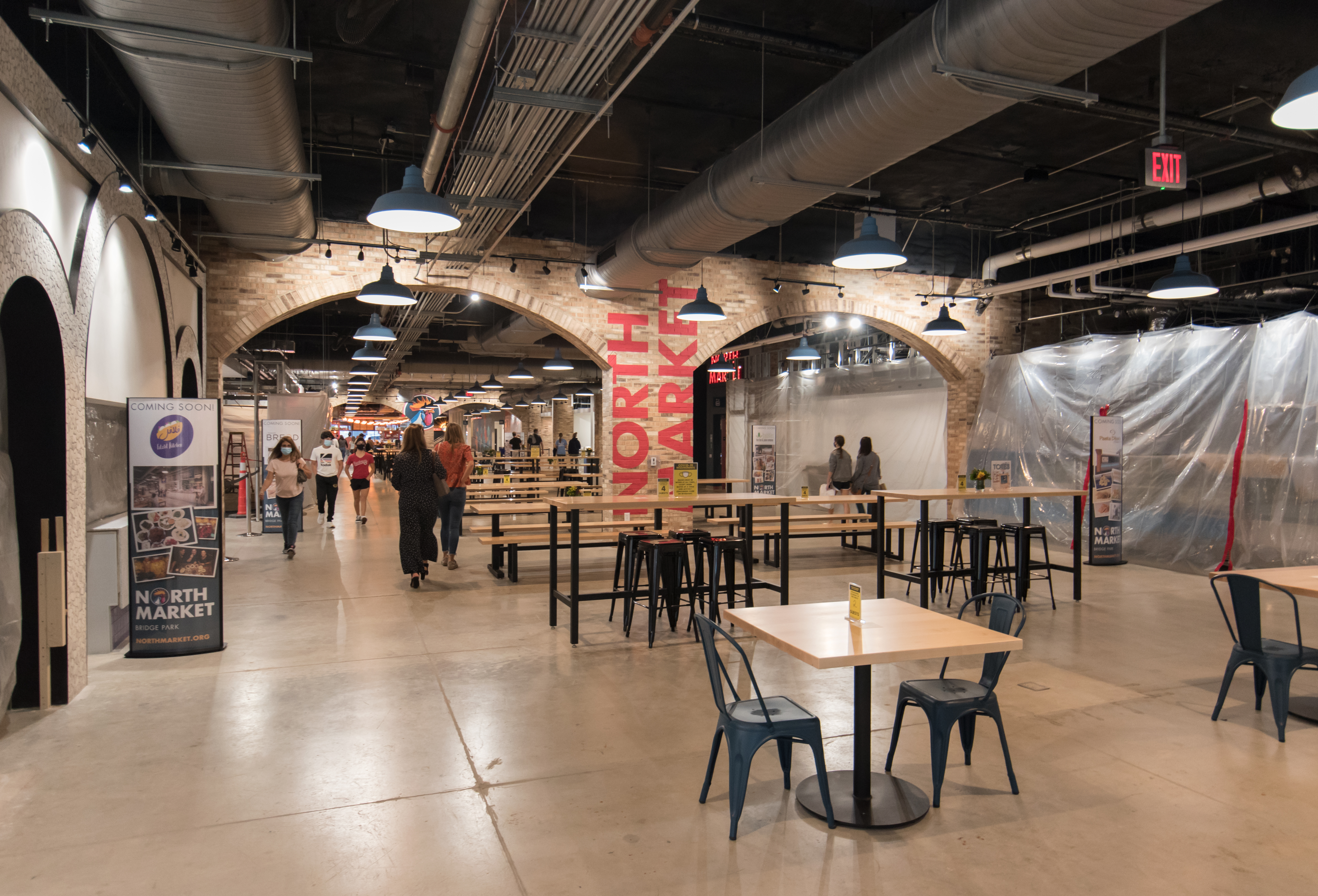
Interior space

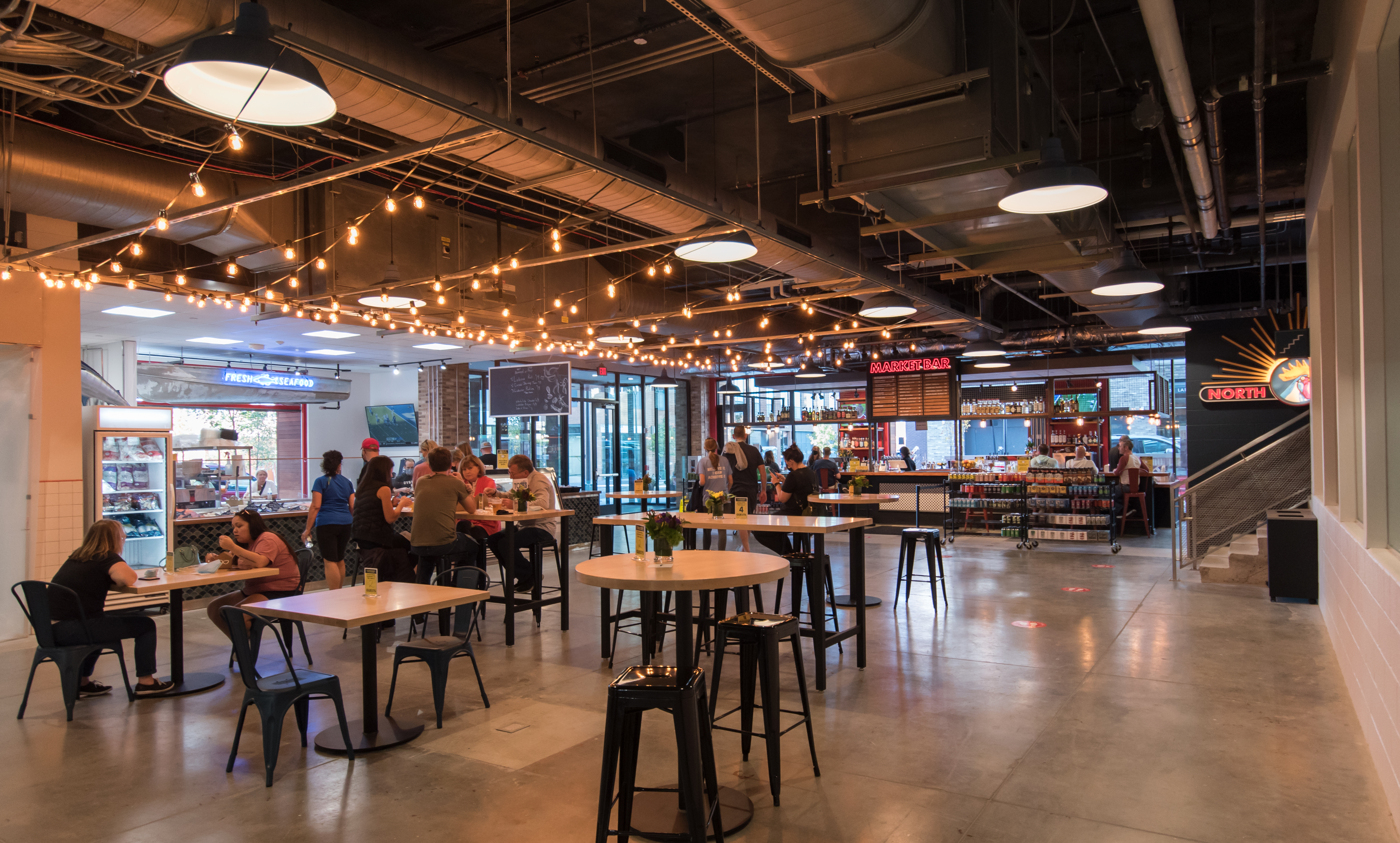
General seating

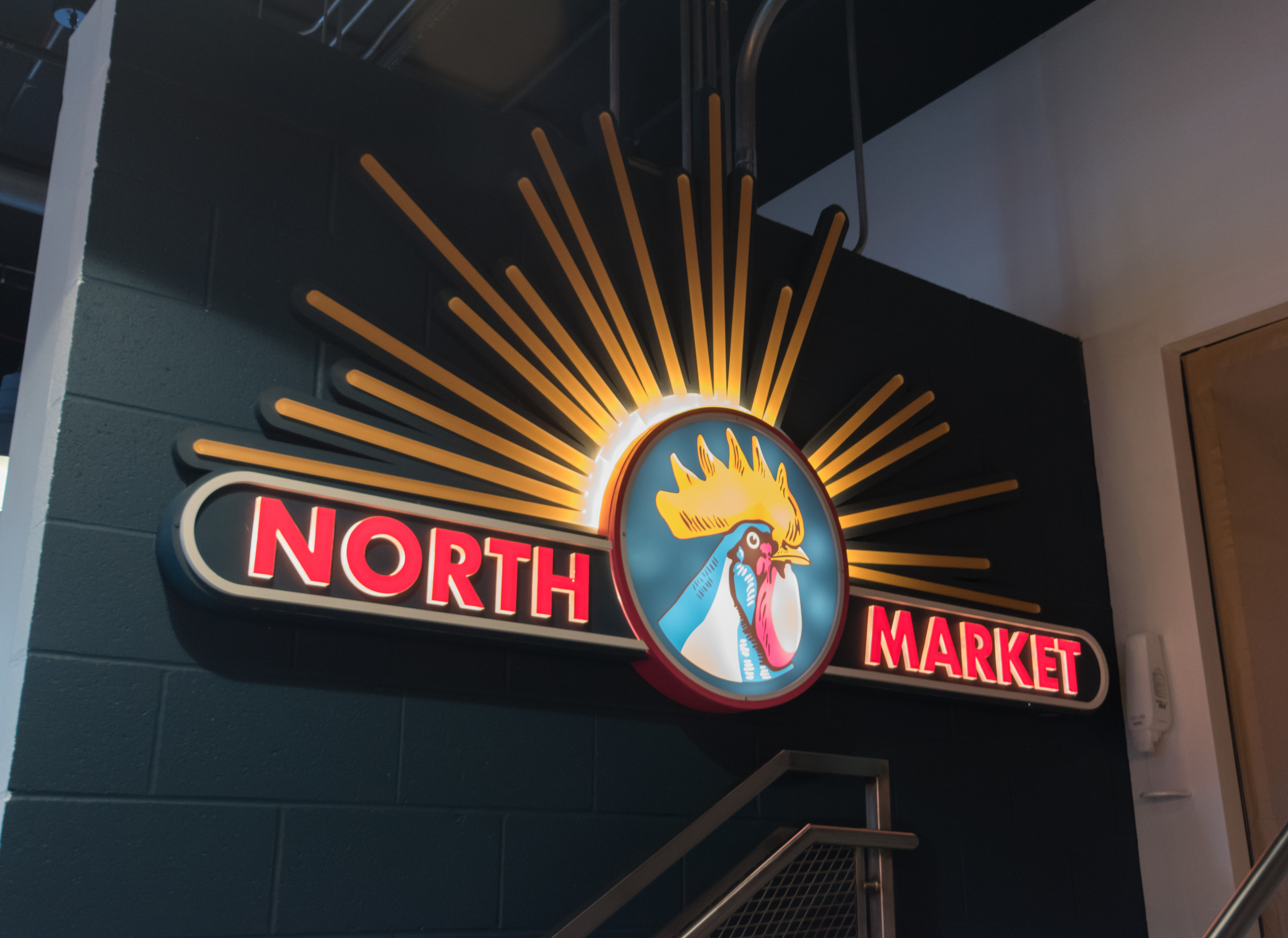
Market sign

== See also ==
- List of tallest buildings in Columbus, Ohio
- Trolley District
