= Thurn's =

Smokehouse in Columbus, Ohio

Coordinates: 39°56′23.1174″N 83°0′39.84″W

Thurn's Specialty Meats, Inc.
- Type: Private
- Industry: Meat packing
- Founded: 1886
- Founder: Alois Thurn
- Headquarters: Columbus, Ohio, USA
- Products: Food service
- Owner: Albert Thurn
- Website: ThurnsMeats.com

Thurn's Specialty Meats or Thurn's was a smokehouse in Columbus, Ohio. It was founded in 1886 and continues to operate using the same methods and recipes for 140 years.

== History ==
=== Founding ===
Alois ‘Grospop’ Thurn, an immigrant from southern Germany started Thurn's in 1886 after seeing that there were no such smoke houses in the area, an area where there with many German immigrants at the time. He began by selling his product door to door in Columbus's Brewery District.

=== Location ===
On April 24, 1886, Alois Thurn opened a stall at the Central Market in Columbus after successfully selling his meats out of his South Front Street home. Some time in the 1890s, Alois Thurn purchased property on Greenlawn Avenue and closed his stall at the Old Central Market. The construction on I-71 through Columbus forced Thurn's to relocate to its current location in 1958. In 1965, the Thurn family closed their stall at the Central Market, two years before the market closed.

=== Ownership ===
Robert Thurn and his two brothers sold the store to Albert Thurn in 1988. Albert's ownership marks the 4th generation of Thurn to own the store. Albert, his brother Anton, his son Alec and sister Teresa all work at the store. His father Robert Thurn died in February 2014.

=== Other ===
On November 2, 1992, Thurn's made the front page of the Columbus Dispatch when Presidential candidate Bill Clinton visited Thurn's while on the campaign trail.

New York magazine and Time magazine food columnist Josh Ozersky hosted a sampling of his favorite meats from Thurn's. The sampling was held on September 10, 2011 at Thurn's.

== Products ==
Thurn's uses the same recipes and methods used by the store approximately 100 years ago and all of their meats come from suppliers in Ohio.

Thurn's carries over 70 products. Capicola, double smoked bacon, schinken, smoked tongue, blood sausage, and smoked pork chops are some of their best selling products.

Thurn's was the first supplier of cottage ham in Columbus.

Until 25 May 2025Thurn's was open to the public three days a week. They usually sell until they run out of product. Currently, they are open sporadically (typically near holidays). They announce dates on their Facebook page.

== Smoker & Equipment ==
The smoke house uses a pit fired smoker with steam radiators that reach temperature of approximately 210 degrees Fahrenheit. Thurn's uses red oak and mulberry in their smoker. Much of the process equipment used at Thurn's dates back as far as the 1930s.
