= GoBus (Ohio) =

Intercity bus service in Ohio, United States

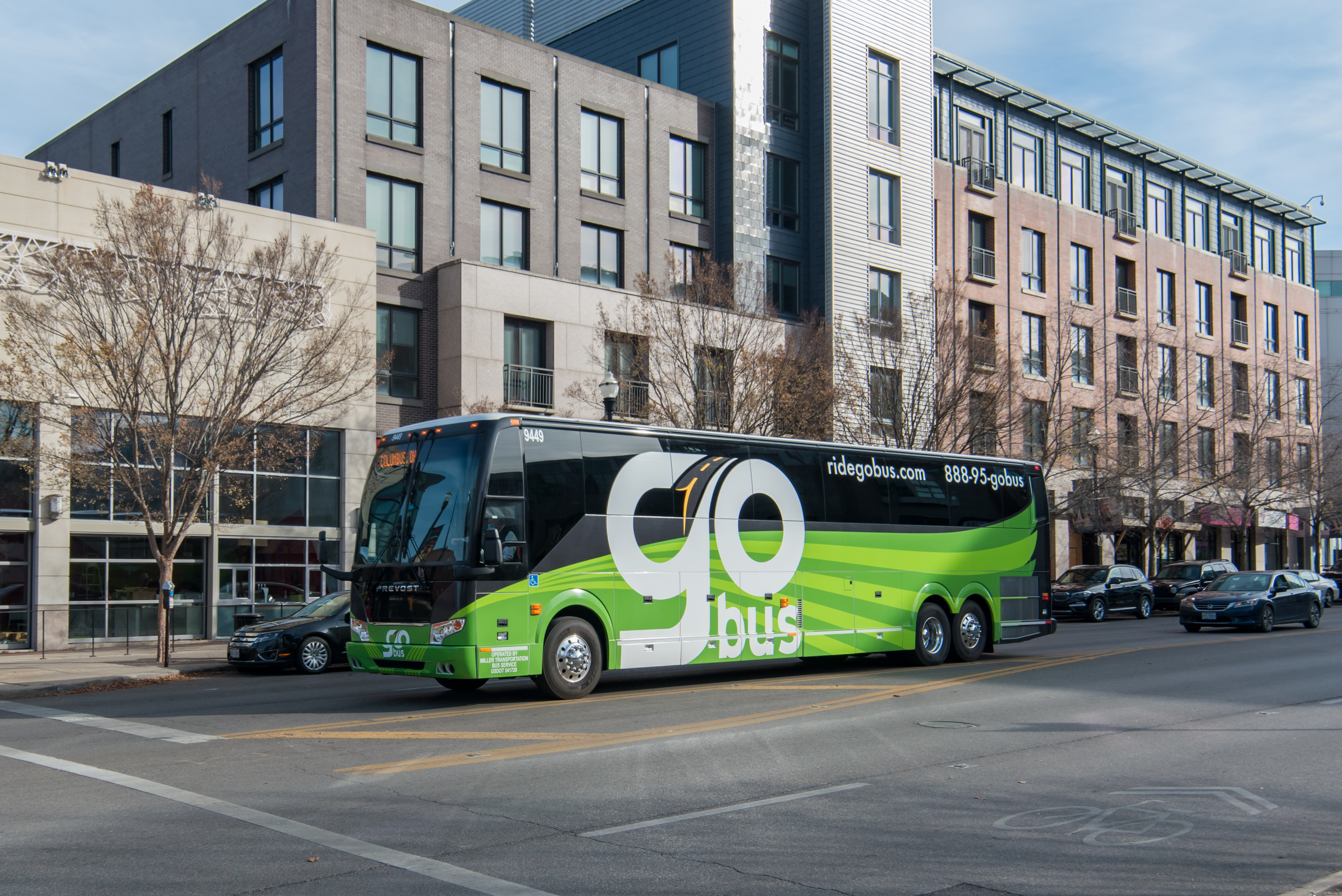
- A GoBus in Columbus's University District
- Parent: Hocking-Athens-Perry Community Action Program
- Commenced operation: November 1, 2010
- Headquarters: Glouster, Ohio
- Service area: Ohio
- Service type: Intercity bus
- Alliance: Greyhound Lines
- Routes: 9
- Operator: Barons Bus Lines
- Website: ridegobus.com

GoBus is an intercity bus service operating in the U.S. state of Ohio. The service operates five routes, focused on rural destinations. GoBus is funded in part by subsidies from the Federal Transit Administration, which provides funding to states for rural intercity bus services. The GoBus service is administered by the Hocking-Athens-Perry Community Action Program, an Athens-based nonprofit, and operated by Barons Bus Lines.

== Service ==
GoBus operates a network of 5 routes in southern and western Ohio, with hubs in Athens and Columbus. As of 2023, all routes are operated by Barons Bus Lines, using a fleet of coaches equipped with power outlets and onboard restrooms. Barons Bus operates some GoBus routes in coordination with their existing route network, providing onward service to destinations outside the state of Ohio, including Chicago, Buffalo, and Charleston, West Virginia.

In late 2025, GoBus announced four routes would be added in the future, expanding service in western and northern Ohio, and outside the state to Pittsburgh, Pennsylvania.

== Cities served ==
- Akron, Ohio
- Albany, Ohio
- Athens, Ohio; Ohio University
- Batavia, Ohio
- Broadview Heights, Ohio
- Caldwell, Ohio
- Cambridge, Ohio
- Canton, Ohio
- Cincinnati, Ohio; University of Cincinnati
- Cleveland, Ohio; Brookpark station
- Columbus, Ohio: Columbus Bus Station
- Coolville, Ohio
- Delphos, Ohio
- Elyria, Ohio
- Jackson, Ohio
- Kenton, Ohio
- Lancaster, Ohio
- Lima, Ohio
- Logan, Ohio
- Marietta, Ohio
- Marysville, Ohio
- Mount Eaton, Ohio
- Nelsonville, Ohio; Hocking College
- Newcomerstown, Ohio
- New Philadelphia, Ohio
- Parkersburg, West Virginia
- Parma, Ohio
- Peebles, Ohio
- Port Clinton, Ohio
- Sandusky, Ohio
- Seaman, Ohio
- Van Wert, Ohio
- Wooster, Ohio; The College of Wooster

== Routes ==
Route	Terminals	Cities Served	Notes
Green Line	Columbus, Athens, Parkersburg	Parkersburg, Marietta, Coolville, Athens, Nelsonville, Logan, Lancaster, Columbus	Columbus Greyhound station serves as a transfer point only; Reservations required for trips to and from Coolville
Orange Line	Cincinnati, Athens	Athens, Jackson, Pikeon, Peebles, Seaman, Batavia, Cincinnati, Arlington Heights	Reservations required for trips to and from Jackson
Blue Line	Cleveland, Marietta, Athens	Athens, Parkersburg, Marietta, Caldwell, Cambridge, Newcomerstown, New Philadelphia, Mount Eaton, Canton, Akron, Cleveland	Reservations required for trips to and from Newcomerstown
Pink Line	Columbus, Wooster, Akron	Columbus, Newark, Utica, Mount Vernon, Gambier, Mount Gilead, Loudonville, Mansfield, Ashland, Wooster, Akron	Reservations required for trips to and from Mount Gilead
Lime Line	Van Wert, Columbus	Van Wert, Delphos, Lima, Marysville, Columbus	Reservations required for trips to and from Delphos
Red Line	Cincinnati, Dayton, Toledo	Toledo, Bowling Green, Findlay, Lima, Kenton, Bellefontaine, Urbana, Springfield, Yellow Springs, Dayton, Middletown, Oxford, Cincinnati	
Gray Line	Ashtabula, Toledo	Toledo, Fremont, Port Clinton, Sandusky, Norwalk, Elyria, Cleveland, Painesville, Ashtabula	
Yellow Line	Columbus, Pittsburgh	Columbus, Newark, Zanesville, Cambridge, St. Clairsville, Wheeling, Steubenville, Pittsburgh	
Purple Line	Toledo, Columbus	Columbus, Marion, Upper Sandusky, Findlay, Bowling Green, Toledo	

== See also ==
- Intercity buses in the United States
