= Trolley District =

Historic site in Columbus, Ohio

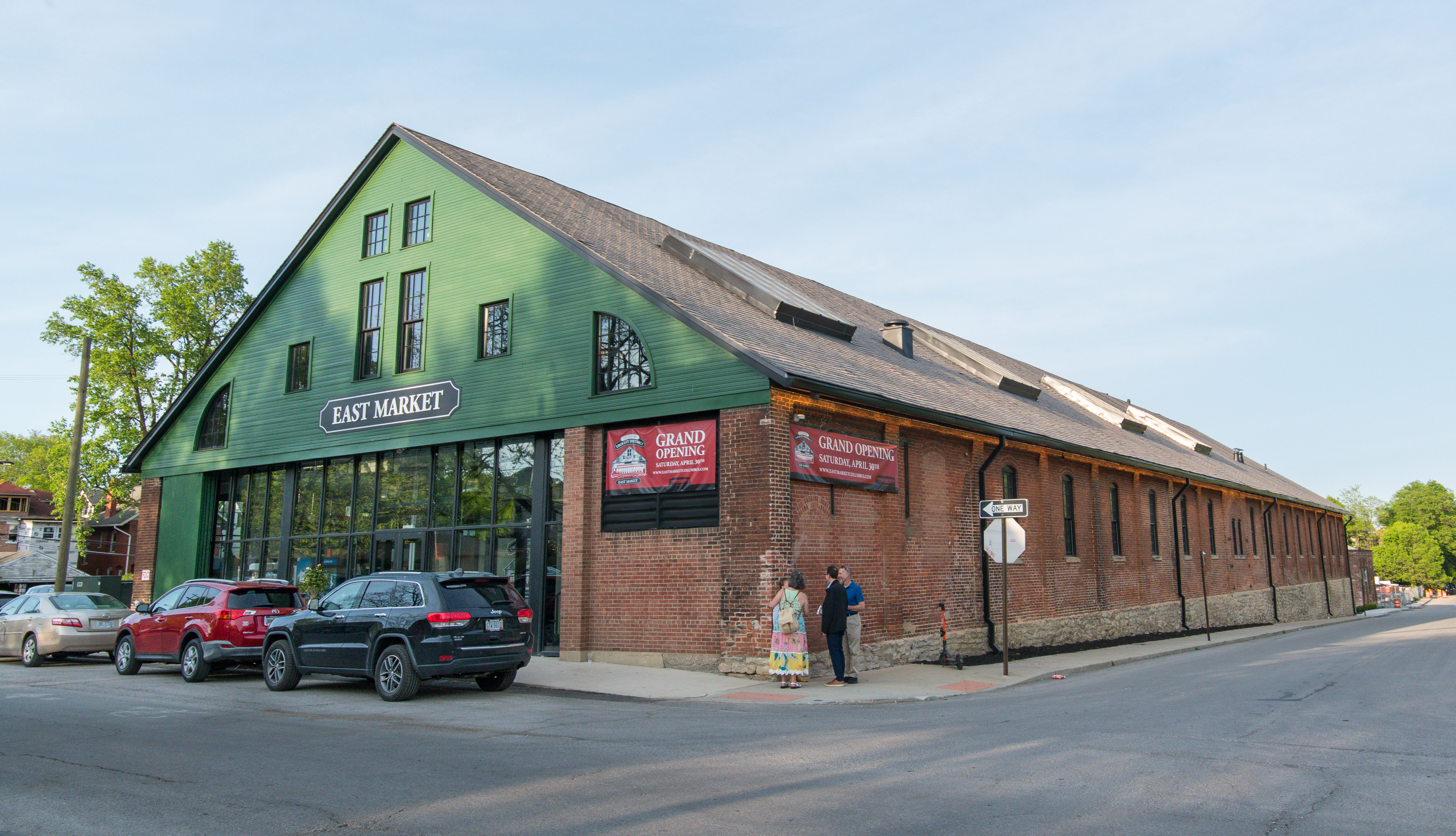
- The East Market, part of the Trolley District
- Location: Kelton Ave. and Oak St., Columbus, Ohio
- Coordinates: 39.962724°N 82.957105°W
- Opened: 2021-2022
- Previous names: Columbus Electric Trolley Barns

History
- Built: 1882–1920

Site notes
- Area: 3 acres (1.2 ha)

U.S. National Register of Historic Places
- Designated: June 4, 1980
- Part of: Columbus Near East Side District
- Reference no.: #78002063

The Trolley District is a mixed-use complex in Columbus, Ohio. The three-acre (1.2 ha) site houses the East Market, a public market and food hall, as well as two bars, restaurants, a brewery, and event space, with plans for neighboring apartments. The property is located in the city's Franklin Park neighborhood and is a contributing part of the Columbus Near East Side District, listed on the National Register of Historic Places.

The site's buildings were built between 1882 and 1920 to serve public transit in Columbus, including horsecars, streetcars, and buses. It became vacant in the 1980s and gradually fell into disrepair. A redevelopment project began in 2007, though it failed to make progress. Another redevelopment project began in 2014, and on-site construction began in March 2020. The first two bars on-site opened in December 2021, the marketplace opened in April 2022, the brewery opened in February 2023, and a restaurant opened in May of that year.

== Attributes ==
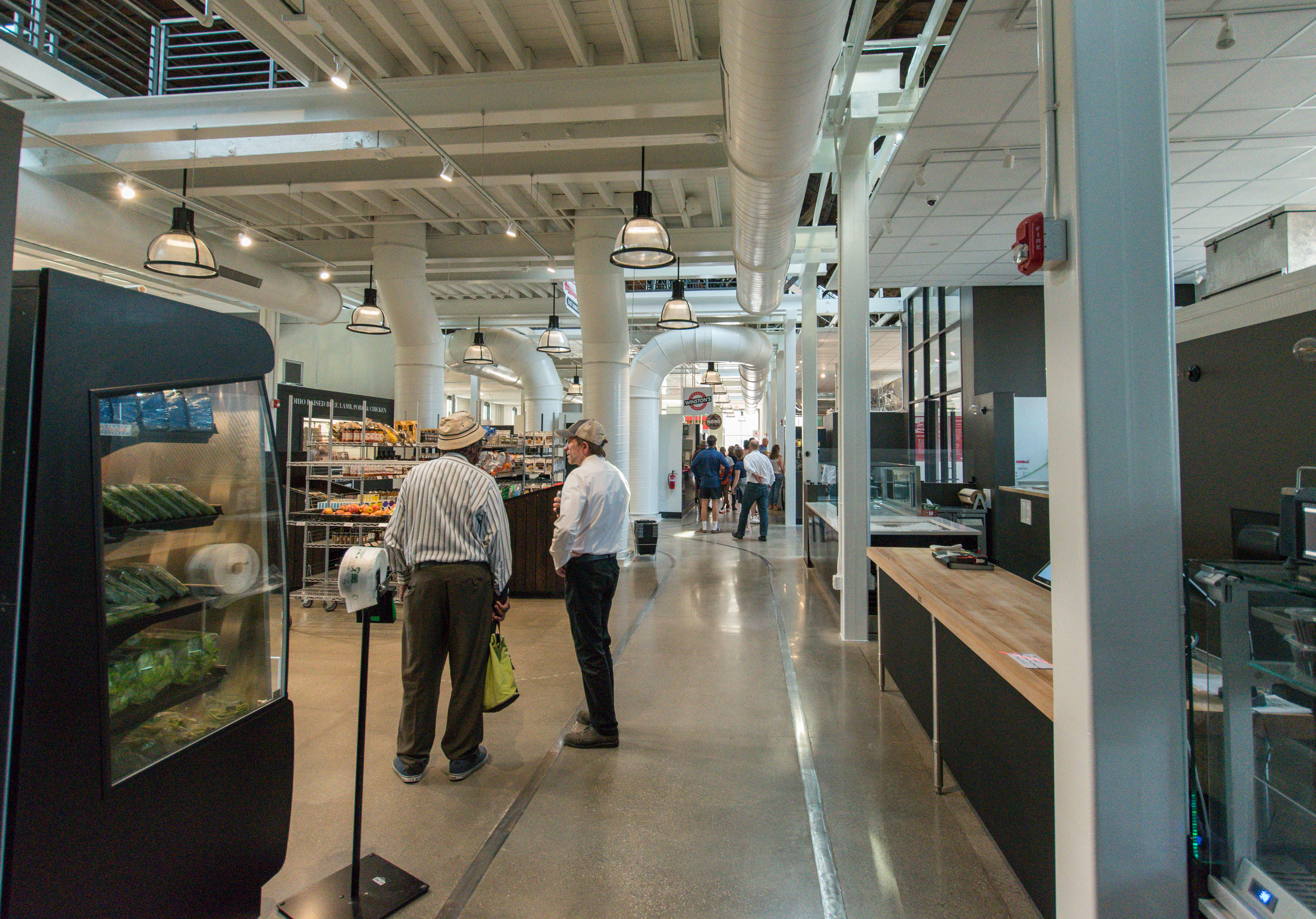
Market interior, 2022

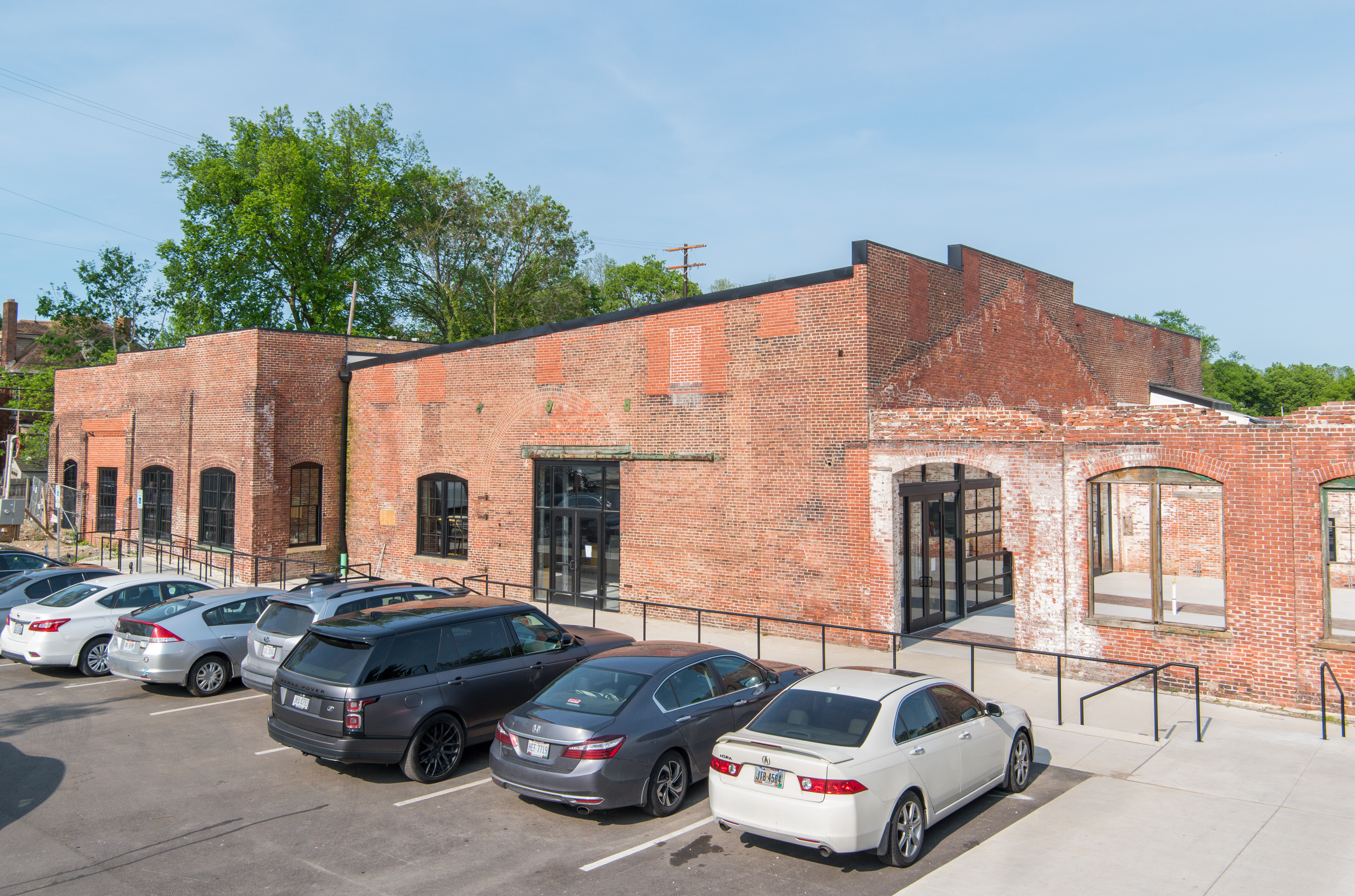
Brewery building renovation, 2022

The trolley barn complex is located at the northeast corner of Oak Street and Kelton (formerly Rose) Avenue. The three-acre (1.2 ha) site lies adjacent to the city-owned Franklin Park, which contains the Franklin Park Conservatory. The site contains six brick buildings, solidly constructed.

The largest building on the site is a former streetcar paint shop, known as the west car barn. The building contains East Market, a public food hall and marketplace similar to the city's North Market and former East, West, and Central Markets. The building was planned to have six stalls for prepared foods, a produce vendor, and a coffee stall. A 2020 report indicated it will now hold 20 stalls and a restaurant on the main floor, storage and refrigeration in the basement, and an upper floor for marketplace seating and event space. A small speakeasy-themed bar will occupy some ground-floor space, to be open to the public except during private events. A raised patio will be constructed around the building's east end, wrapping around to the north.

The property also contains a 13,000 sq ft (1,200 m^{2}) taproom for the Columbus Brewing Company, in the former carriage and later trolley repair shop building. The site includes a large bar, fireplace, several brewing tanks, and an outdoor beer garden.

Other buildings will hold foodservice operations and other businesses; one will become a second location for The Butcher & Grocer, a local butcher shop.

The site was planned to contain 168 parking spaces, including on a plot of land north of the East Market building, which formerly held another car barn. A space near the taproom was planned to be flexible to contain delivery space, overflow parking, and event space.

A 102-unit apartment complex is set to be constructed on an empty lot across Oak Street, to the south of the trolley barn complex. The buildings, at three to five stories, will contain about 15 affordable units. The complex was a requirement for the brewery to lease its space.

== History ==
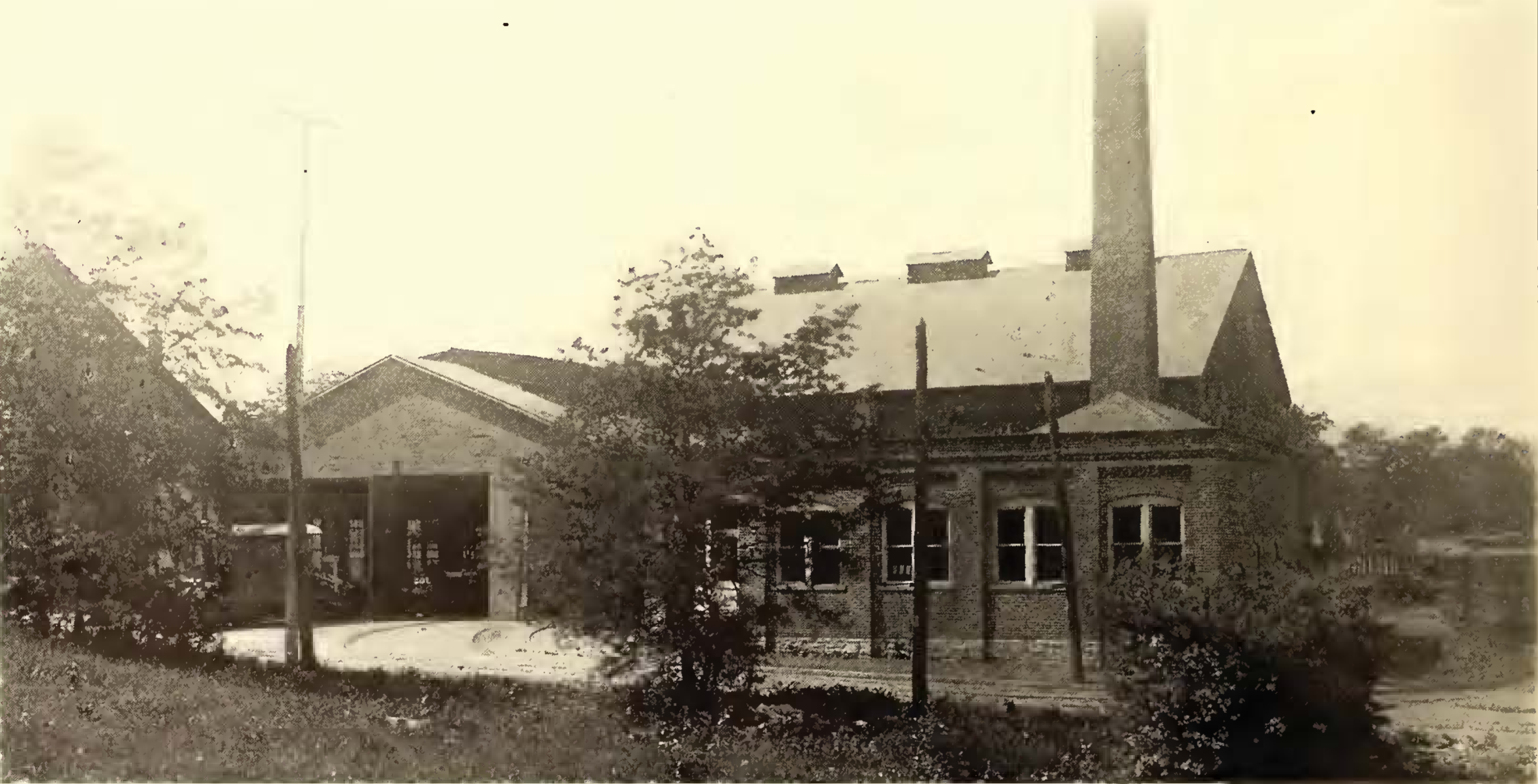
Part of the complex in 1904

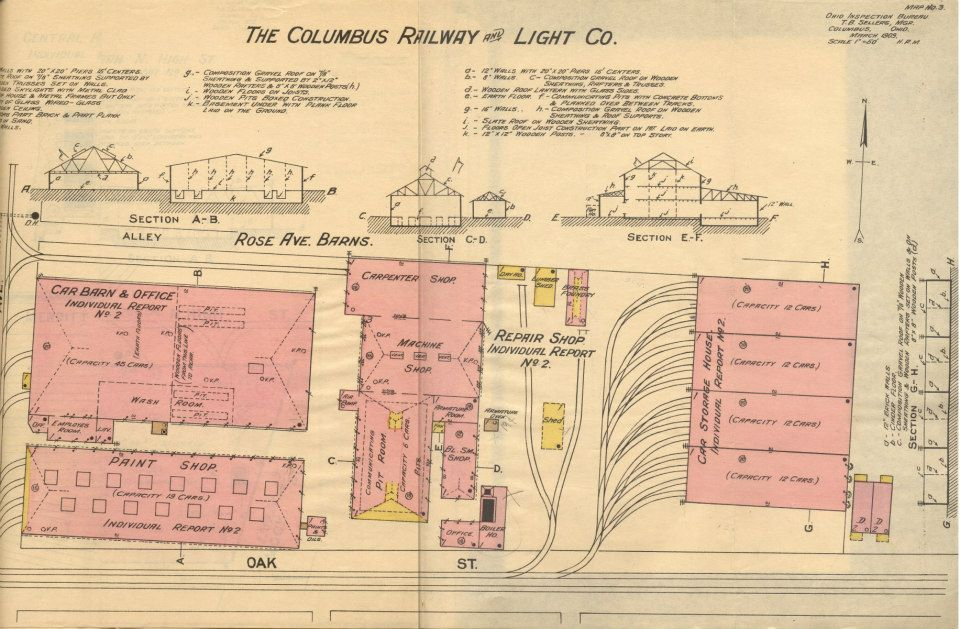
Site map, 1909

The buildings were constructed between 1882 and 1920 to serve the city's electric trolley network. The earliest building served horsecars, while every building served streetcars until their discontinuation, and subsequently buses until the 1980s. Several of the buildings were subsequently demolished or fell into disrepair.

When built, the site was a considerable distance from Columbus's center by carriage. The site, originally for the Columbus Railway & Light Co., became owned by the Columbus Transit Co. The property was used as a repair shop, to lift cars, paint them, and manufacture and repair metal and wooden parts.

The site was sold to Minnie McGee for $231,000 in a sheriff's sale in 2003. Plans to redevelop the site date to at least 2007. At that time, the Columbus Compact Corporation planned to develop it into the Trolley Market, an organic food and arts and crafts market with outdoor activity spaces, performance spaces, community greenhouses, and other features. In 2010, Columbus Compact sought community members' help in redeveloping the site, gathering a group called the Friends of Franklin Park Trolley Barn. The corporation offered the property owner $189,000 for the property in 2013.

By March 2013, the property was ordered to be cleaned up, as the owner had let it decline. Amid numerous code violations, bricks and roof tiles were beginning to fall into neighboring properties, and prostitution and drug dealing was reportedly taking place there. The 2013 court order came with a fine of $250 per day until the property was repaired. By September the court ordered McGee to sell the property or face $30,000 in fines accumulated from the earlier court order.

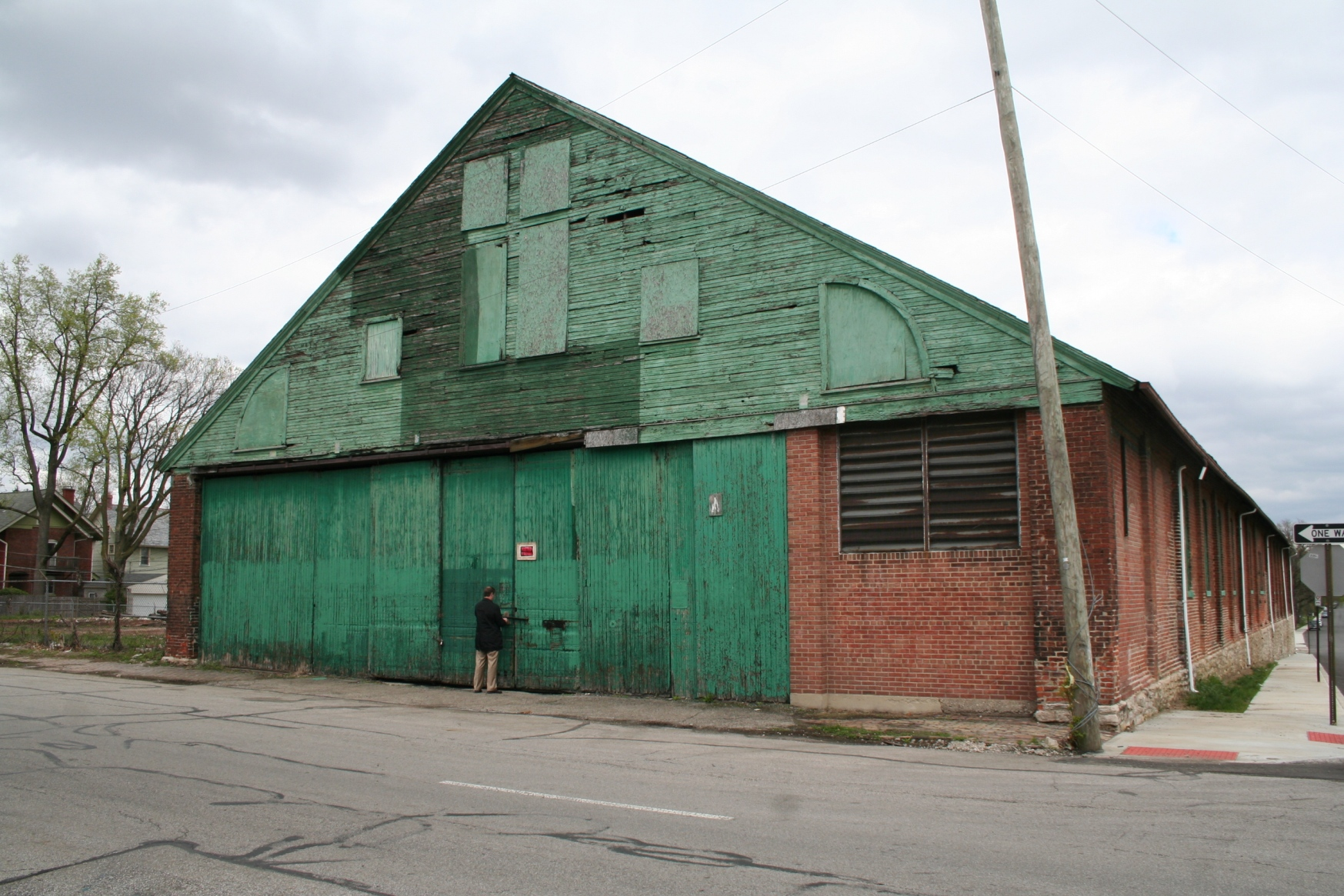
The current East Market building in 2015, prior to restoration

In 2014, Brad DeHays of Connect Realty purchased the site and its buildings from Minnie McGee, at its appraised value. In 2017, DeHays announced his plan for the site: an East Market (similar to the city's North Market and former East, West, and Central Markets), along with a Columbus Brewing Company taproom and a foodservice space. A 102-unit apartment complex was planned to be built across Oak Street. The developer applied for historic tax credits to help fund the entire project, and planned to keep as many of the existing structures as possible, later saying he plans to keep every building on the site. DeHays stressed the importance of working with the community and supporting it with fresh produce and healthy food options, as the area is currently underserved by grocery stores. After being passed over for historic tax credits in 2017, the project received its $2 million in credits in 2018. The trolley barn complex project was estimated to cost $14 million, while the apartment complex development was set to cost $15 million. Construction began in March 2020; the first phase – the East Market building – is set to be completed in August 2021, while the easternmost buildings will be complete by November 2021. Renovations have included new floors and structural supports, repaired ceilings, and large patches in walls. Earlier opening estimates called for June or July 2021, delayed by construction difficulties, including a fire damaging the roof and heavy rains that collapsed a wall.

In 2019, the city approved a substantial tax agreement with the property owners, after talks with DeHayes and former mayor Michael Coleman. The city classified the site as a "downtown redevelopment district" (DRD), which would not lower the property's taxes. Instead it would divert 70% of the site's property taxes for 30 years to subsidize the fresh food market in the development. The agreement would also include a free market stall for Columbus City Schools' culinary students to use, high-speed internet for East High School, and mobile laptop stations at the market. The agreement was criticized by the school district teachers union president, who described the agreement as an unnecessary giveaway as the project is certain to be profitable. He also stated that the educational benefits are not as meaningful as staff and facility upgrades. Scott Woods, writing for Columbus Alive, noted similar concerns, and that the city should be taxing the property at a higher rate. DeHays stated that the produce market couldn't survive without a subsidy, and that the project would otherwise not be financially viable. North Market's director agreed, though he noted that the Trolley District project is for-profit, unlike North Market, and thus could support less-profitable aspects of its operations.

The first two commercial operations opened in the development in December 2021: The Railhouse, a tavern, and Switch, a speakeasy-style bar. The East Market opened in April 2022. The Columbus Brewing Company opened on the site in February 2023, followed by the Local Cantina restaurant and bar, part of a larger chain, in May 2023.

== See also ==
- National Register of Historic Places listings in Columbus, Ohio
- Public transit in Columbus, Ohio
