= Central Market (Columbus, Ohio) =

Public market in Columbus, Ohio

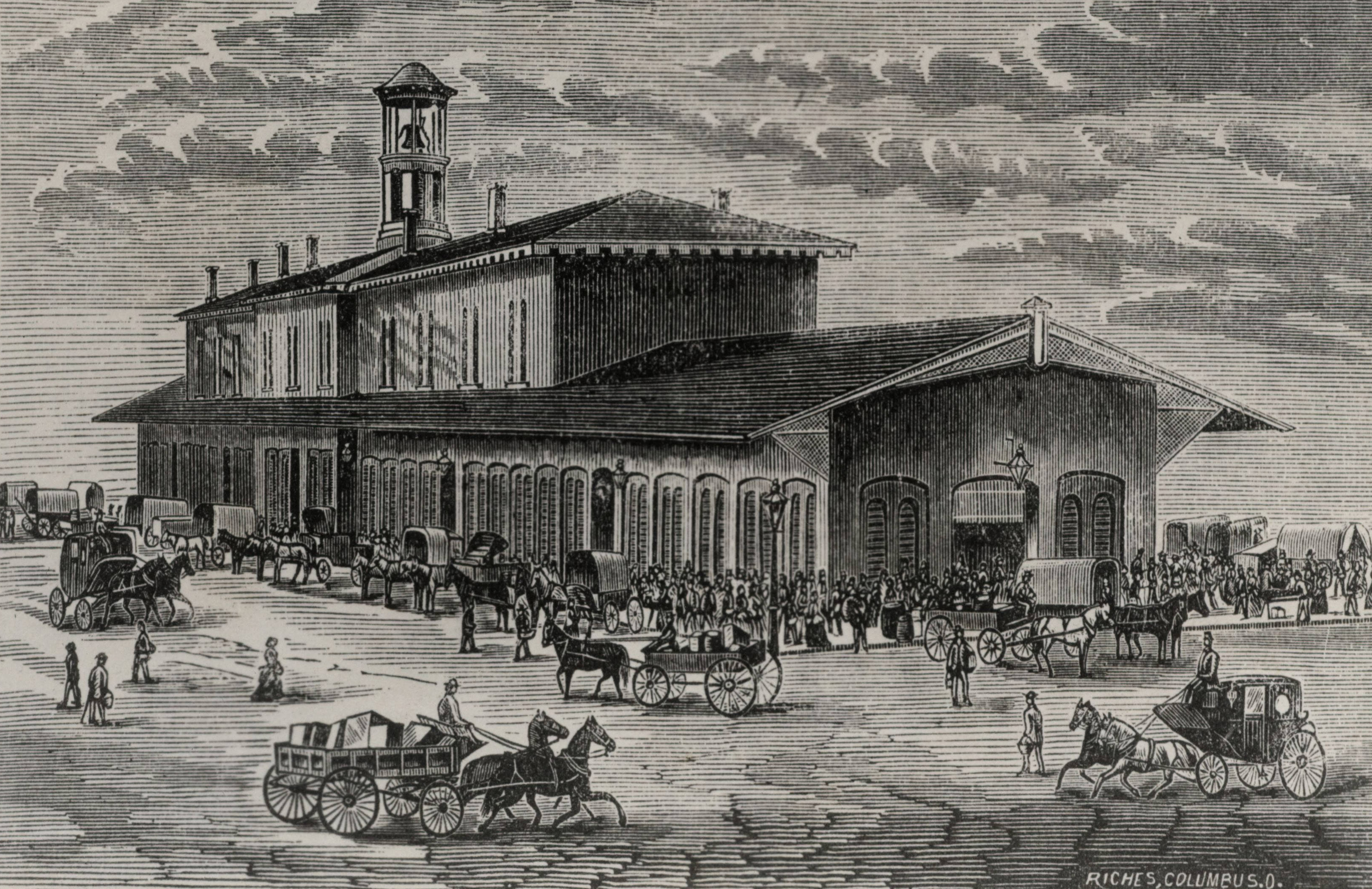
- 1873 illustration of the market
- Interactive map pinpointing where the market stood
- Location: Fourth Street, Columbus, Ohio
- Coordinates: 39.958654°N 82.995710°W
- Opened: 1814
- Closed: 1966
- Owner: City of Columbus
- Floors: 2

Central Market was a public market in Downtown Columbus, Ohio. The market operated from 1814 to 1966, was the location of Columbus's first city hall for two decades, from 1850 to 1872. It moved three times, each time into successively larger buildings. The third market building stood the longest time, from 1850 to 1966, when it was demolished as part of the Market-Mohawk Urban Renewal project. North Market remains, the only one left of four public markets that operated in the city.

== Attributes ==
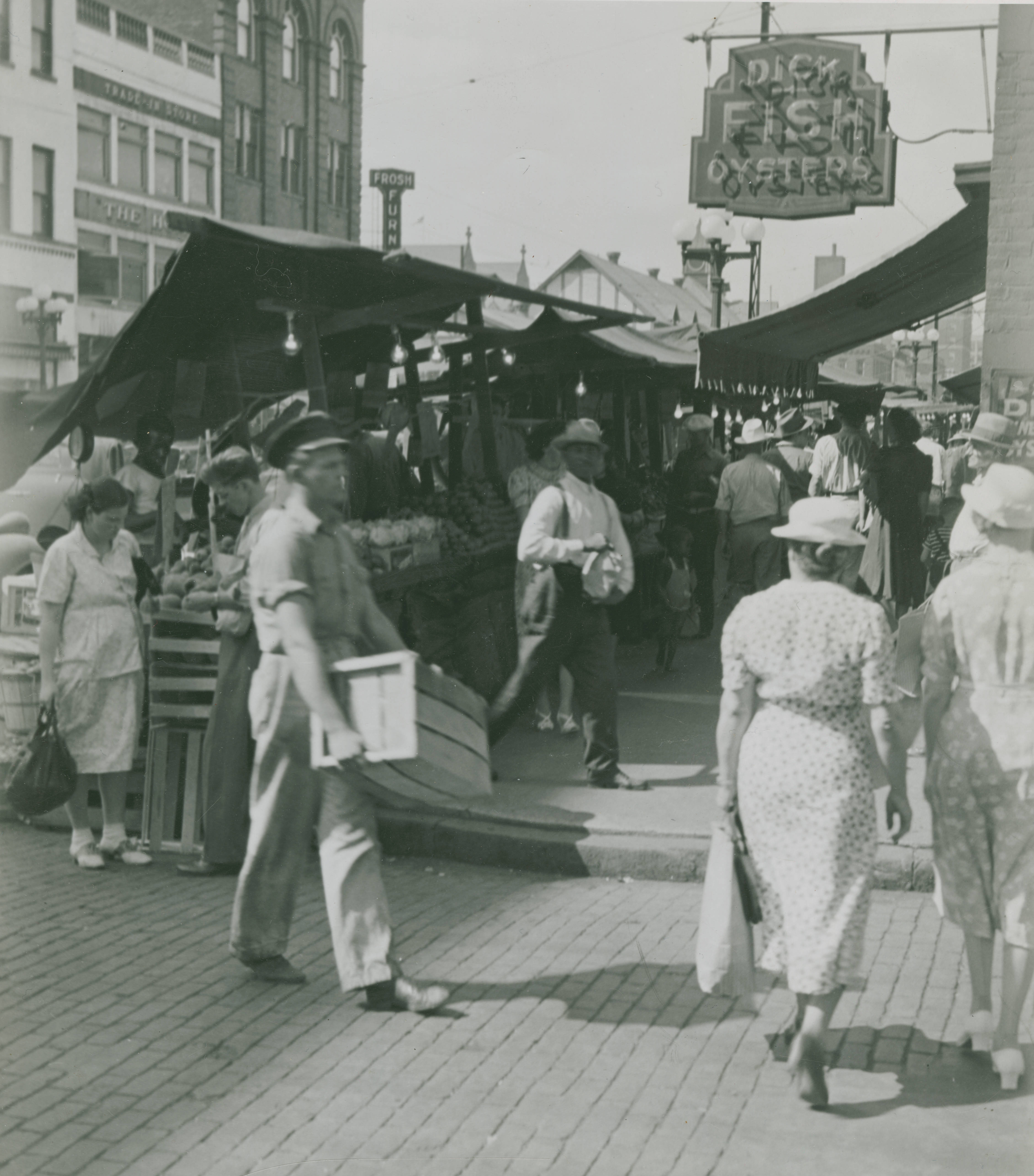
Central Street Market operating outside Central Market, 1939.

The third, longest-lasting market was located on the west side of Fourth Street, between Town and Rich Streets, the current site of the now-former Greyhound bus station.

The first Central Market was a small building built of wood, 50 ft (15 m) long. The second was larger, and had two stories.

The third Central Market building, again two stories, was built of brick and limestone. It had a small central bell tower, and was 388 feet long and 37 feet wide. The first floor entirely held stalls for fruit, vegetables, meat, poultry, and flowers. Additional stalls were located outside the building; the market's total was approximately 64. Farmers would arrive to set up stalls around 3-4 a.m., and the market's opening bell would ring at 6 a.m. Early meats sold here included squirrels, pigeons, doves, quail, and rabbits. Produce included peaches, pears, quinces, apples, blackberries, and cherries. Apple cider was sold at 5-7 cents per gallon.

The building's second floor housed City Hall, including a council chamber and courtroom, with two neighboring jail cells and a guard room. Individual rooms held the offices of the mayor, city marshal, clerk, surveyor, and the market master, the marketplace supervisor. The building's 1930 remodel added the Tudor Revival half-timber trim commonly associated with the building.

Until the Columbus City Prison was built in 1879, prisoners were held in a two-story brick building adjacent to the market. For trials, they were led across a wooden walkway into the second-story courtroom.

Central Market was surrounded on four sides and surrounding sidewalks with sheds and horse-drawn stands for farm stalls, selling the agricultural products that were an important part of Central Ohio's economy at the time.

== History ==
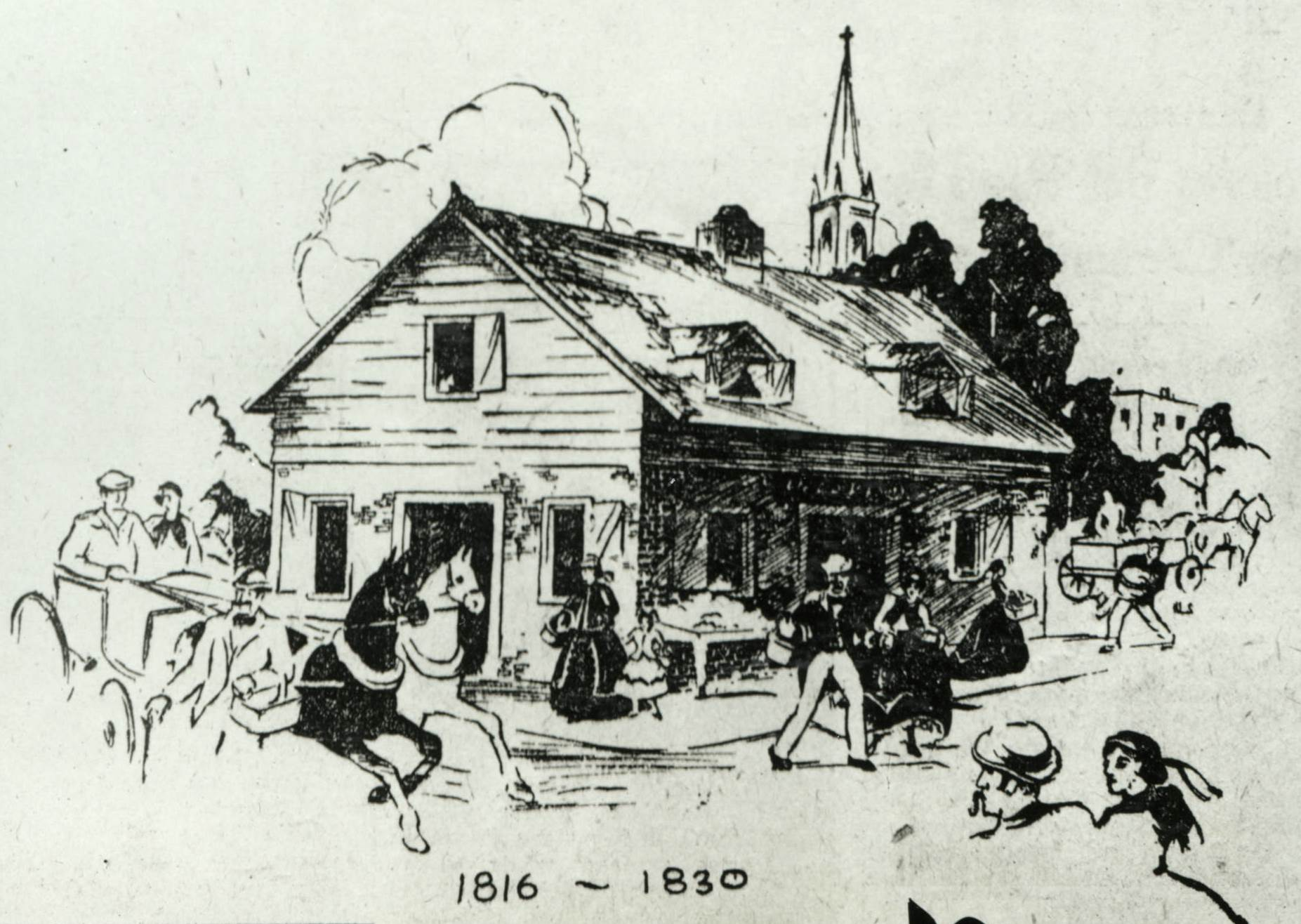
Artist's conception of the first Central Market.

The first Central Market was located on High Street, south of Rich Street, built in 1814 and operated for two years. In 1817, Columbus City Council had a new market built on State Street, just west of High Street. Years later, the building was sold to John Young for use as the city's first gaming and pool hall. The city then purchased the third market building's land for $2,000, and constructed the building from 1849–50. The new space was desirable given its large amount of space for parking. The market building was designed with its second floor as the first official and permanent City Hall; before this there was no official space for the mayor and city council to meet. The state constitution, rewritten in 1850, created more power and duties for city mayors, also creating a need for a more formal space. Lorenzo English was the first mayor to take on these duties and operate from this new City Hall. In 1872, a new City Hall was dedicated on Capitol Square, removing the municipal functions of Central Market to the new building.

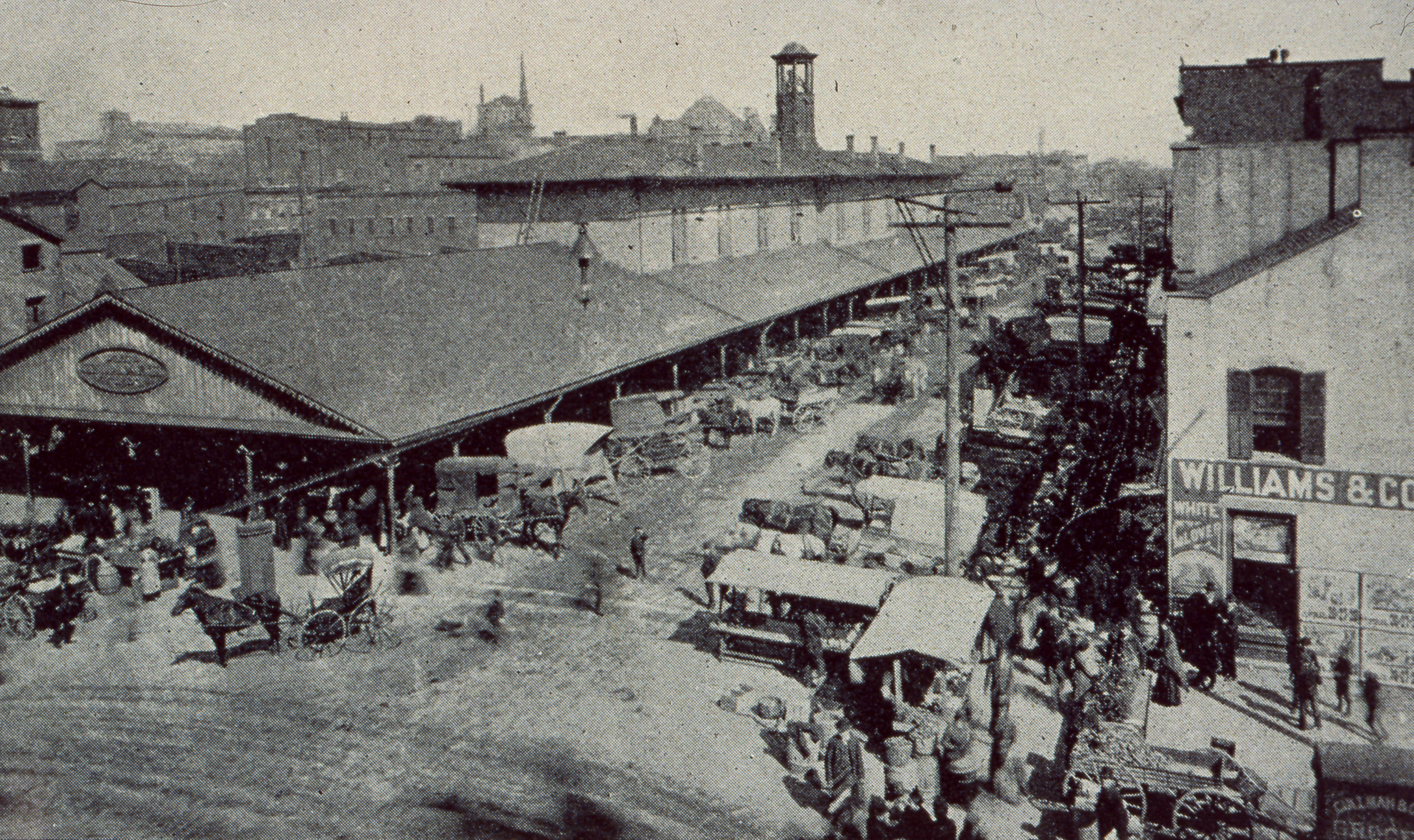
Central Market in 1898.

In 1930, the market was remodeled by Thomas Tully, with new dormers, half-timber trim, new roof lines, and heating and refrigeration installed. The market was thriving into the 1950s, as much of the population lacked refrigeration and needed to purchase smaller quantities of food more often. At its height, the market drew in 20,000 people on Saturdays and had 65 meat vendors. In 1950, the market celebrated its centennial; Governor Jim Rhodes stated it would not be redeveloped, as it had significant historic value. By the 1960s, as urban renewal became popular, and as the market was in need of repair, with tenants declining, Mayor Jack Sensenbrenner led the effort to remove it. One city councilman and several preservationists fought to save it for six years. City Council would indecisively revive and eliminate the market in subsequent sequential meetings.

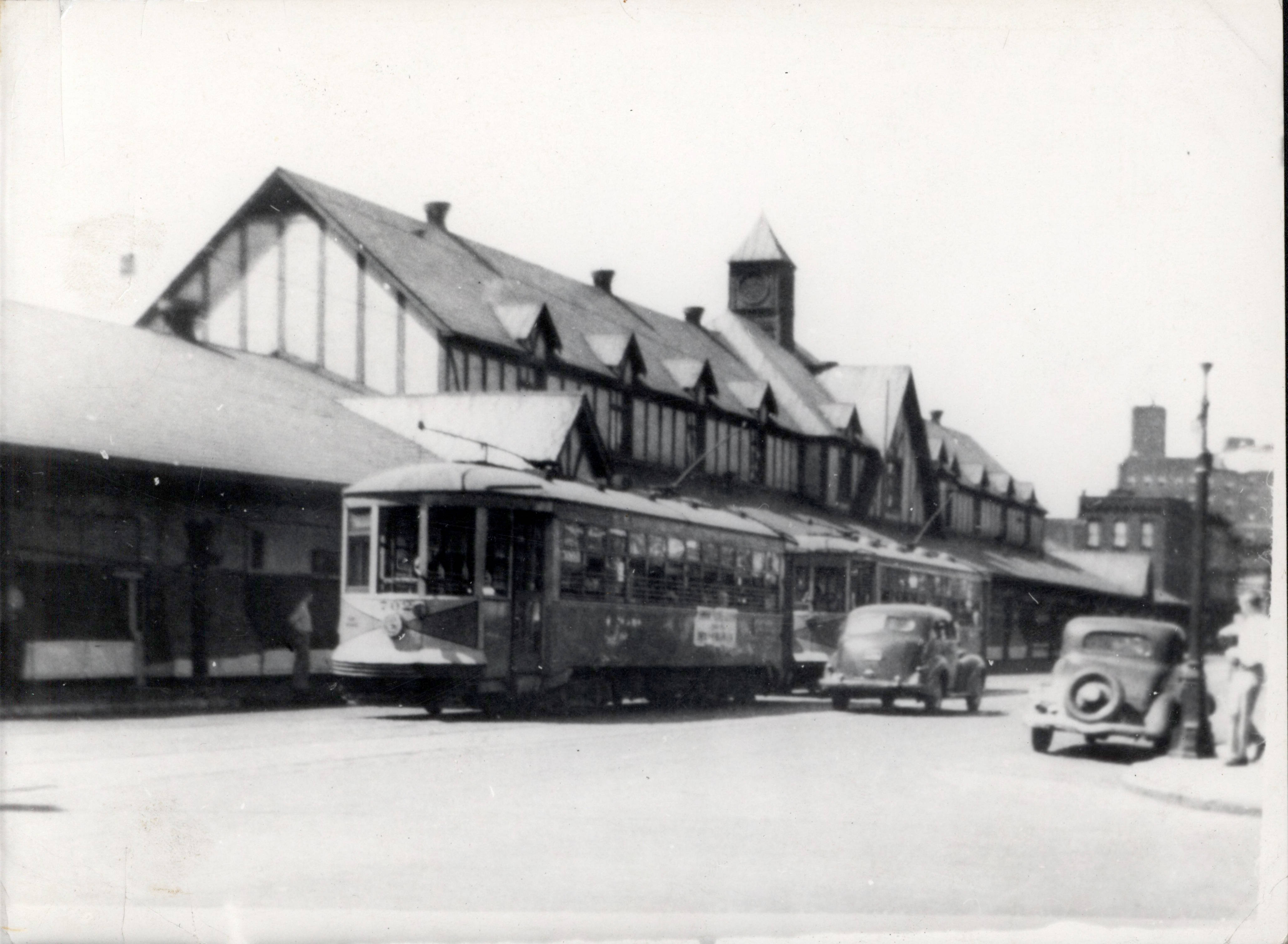
The market in 1948 with its post-1930 half-timber trim.

The market was sold from the city to United Redevelopment Corp. as part of the Market-Mohawk Urban Renewal project. Many of the market's merchants moved to the then nearly empty North Market. On June 9, 1966, its demolition was scheduled, after a judge refused to spare the market. Merchants still operated out of the space into the last weeks of it standing. The demolition took place from June 12 to 21, leaving only bricks and timbers. The contracted demolition company was S.G. Loewendick & Sons, notable for demolishing other landmarks in Columbus.

The closure of Central Market made North Market the sole remaining public market in the city. East Market stood on Mount Vernon and Miami Avenues from 1892 to 1947, while the West Market was built on Gift Street in Franklinton in 1889, and still stands, having been converted to a Boys and Girls Club in 1926. A new East Market opened in 2022 as part of the Trolley District development on the Near East Side.

== See also ==
- Columbus City Hall
