= Columbus Bus Station =

Intercity bus station in Columbus, Ohio

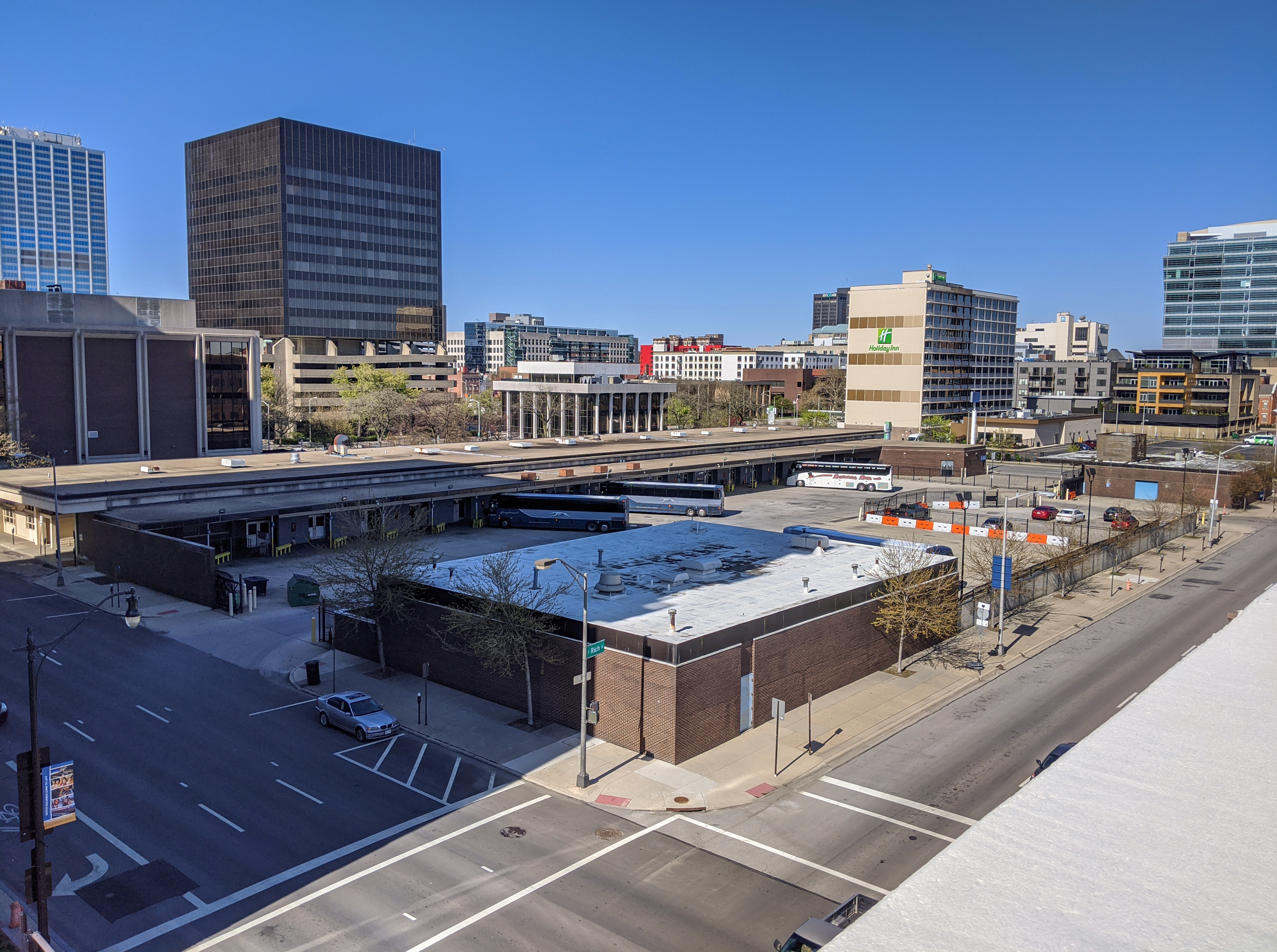

General information
- Location: 111 E. Town Street, Columbus, Ohio
- Coordinates: 39.958577°N 82.996372°W
- Owner: The Dial Corporation
- Operator: Greyhound Lines
- Connections: 3, 6, 8, 9, 11, 13, 51, 52, 61, 71, 72, 73, 74; CoGo

Other information
- Website: Official website

History
- Opened: August 1, 1969
- Closed: April 1, 2022
Location

The Columbus Bus Station was an intercity bus station in Downtown Columbus, Ohio. The station, managed by Greyhound Lines, also served Barons Bus Lines, Miller Transportation, GoBus, and other carriers. The current building was constructed in 1969. From 1979 until its closure in 2022, with the demolition of Union Station and a short-lived replacement, the Greyhound station was the only intercity transit center in the city.

Columbus has seen intercity bus transit since 1929, when a union station opened on Town Street. Sixteen companies, including a Greyhound bus company, operated there. In 1932, a competing bus terminal opened on State Street, operated by Greyhound. By 1940, the station was replaced by another Greyhound terminal, in a space neighboring the current bus station site. The 1940 terminal was lauded at its opening, though in following decades, it reportedly deteriorated and became a place of refuge for the homeless. The current bus station was built from 1968 to 1969 in a modern style, and featured numerous traveler amenities. Efforts to keep the station safe were successful early on, though the Greyhound Corporation proposed its sale by 1988. In 2021, following a shooting incident and reports of frequent police visits, the property was declared a public nuisance. Agreements were made to increase security, and the local mass transit agency, COTA, agreed to purchase and redevelop the site. Intercity bus services moved to a COTA facility in 2022, and COTA plans to demolish the 1969 station and create a mixed-use development on the property.

== Attributes ==
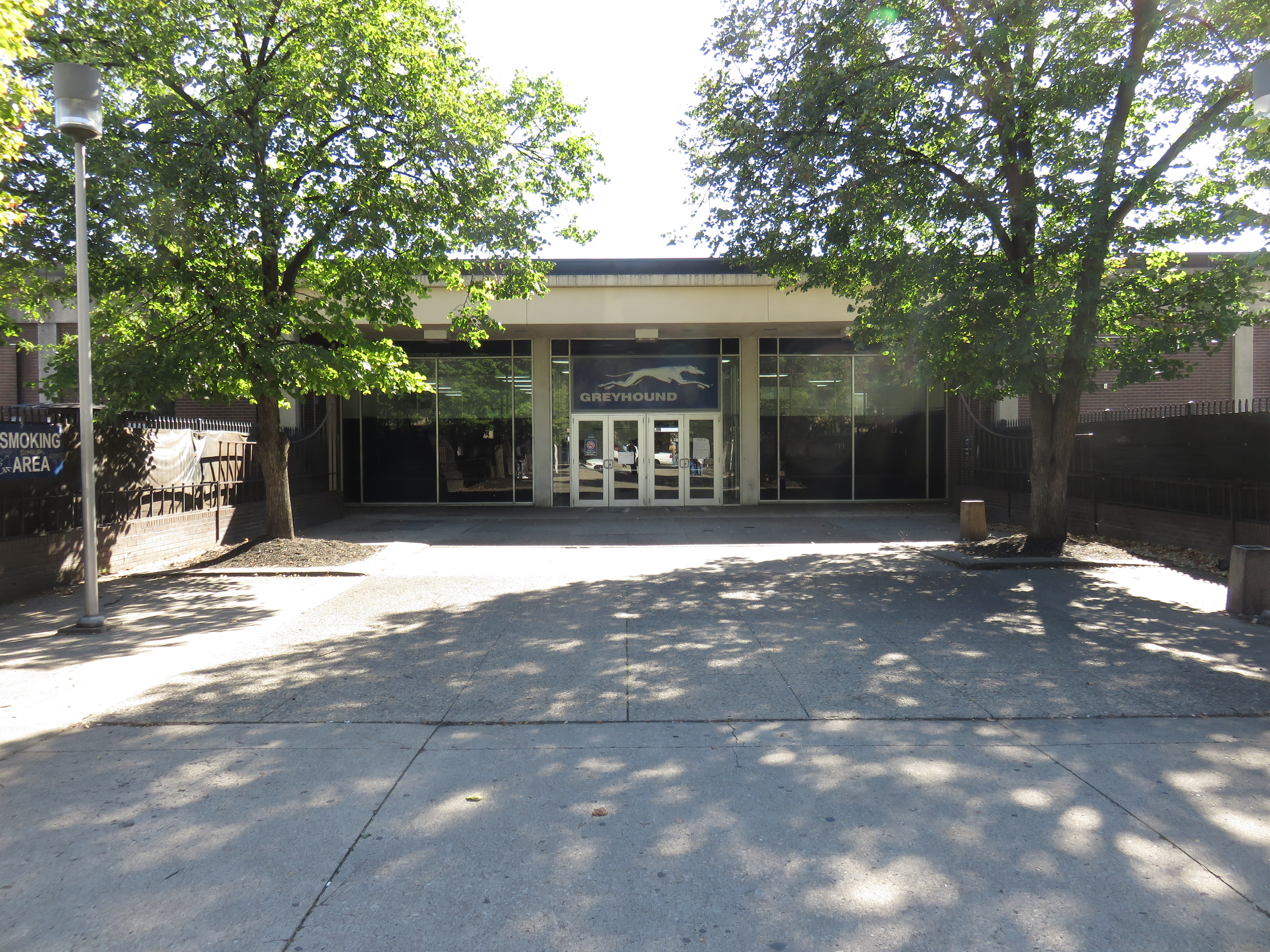
Main entrance

The Greyhound station building sits on a 2.45-acre (1.0 ha) site, taking up most of a city block. The terminal is roughly bordered by Town and Rich streets to the north and south, and 3rd and 4th streets to the west and east. The property includes the 32,000 sq ft (3,000 m^{2}) station, two smaller buildings, and a parking area for the intercity buses. The station is built of brick and concrete, and has 20 bays for boarding buses. A landscaped pedestrian mall connects the building's set-back entrance to Town Street. The station was open 24/7, and has entrances at every side; some were permanently closed.

The bus station, managed by Greyhound Lines, also served Barons Bus Lines, Miller Transportation, GoBus, and other carriers. Flixbus coaches stopped on the south side of the station. In 2021, the station saw about 34 buses stopping per day.

The Greyhound site is considered an important property to city officials, given the scale of development taking place around it, as well as its location by Columbus Commons and the busy 3rd and 4th streets.

== History ==
=== Early stations ===
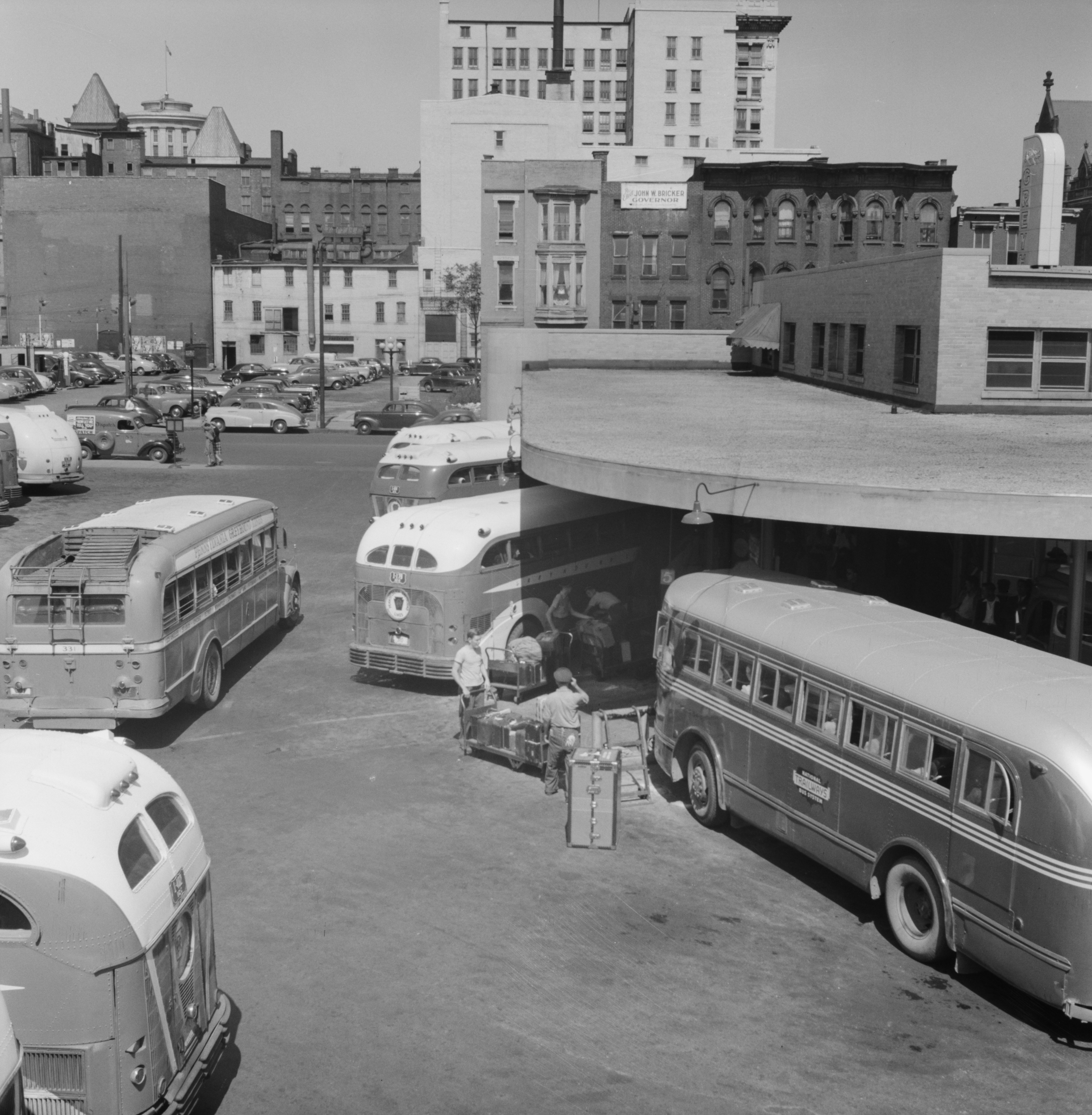
The 81 E. Town St. station in 1943

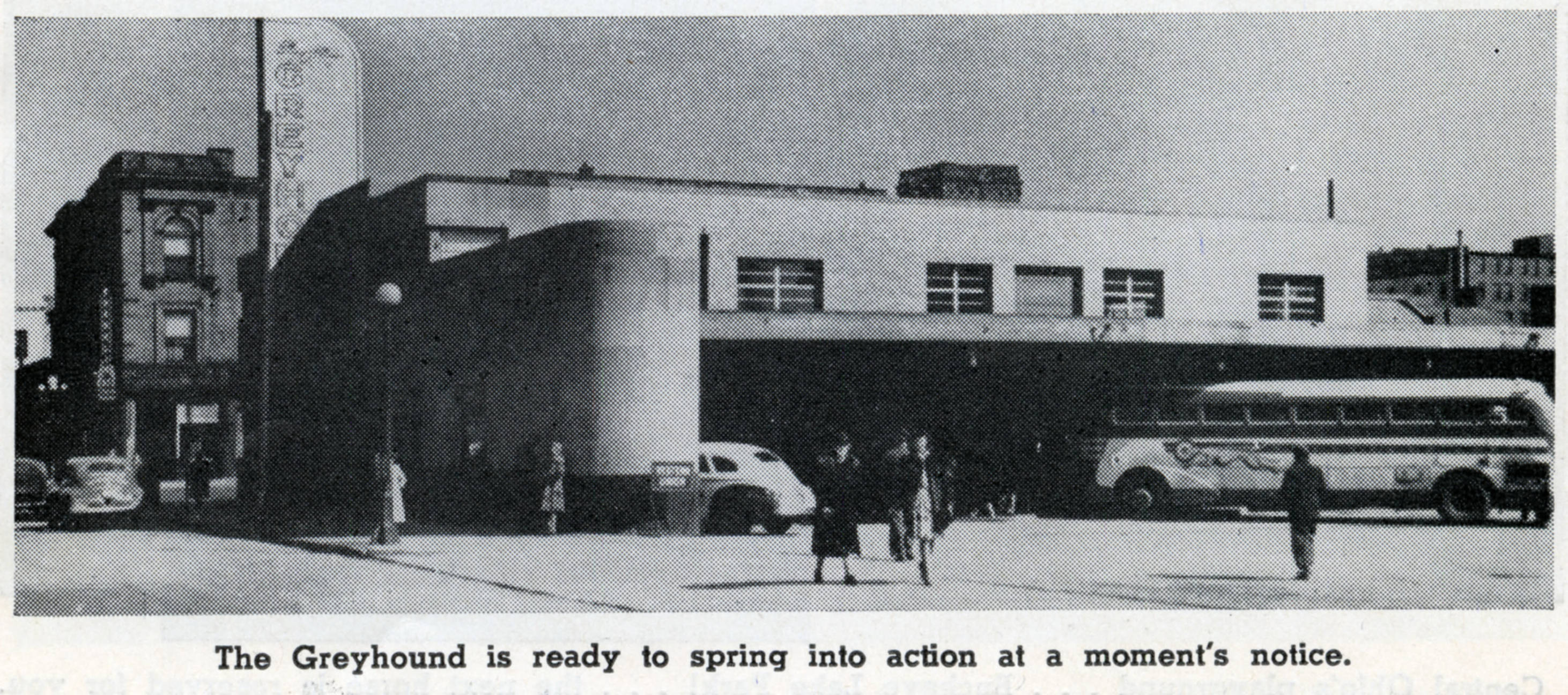
81 E. Town St. station, 1945

Among the first intercity bus stations in Columbus was the Union Bus Station, which opened around 1929 at 47 E. Town Street. 150 buses were estimated to use it per day, with platforms allowing for 12 buses to unload at once. The Union Bus Station was to have a 110-seat waiting room, restaurant, restrooms, soda fountains, news stands, tobacco shops, a barber, and a tailor. Sixteen companies operated out of it at opening, including the Greyhound Lines Columbus-Zanesville Transportation Company.

On April 23, 1932, a new Greyhound bus terminal opened at 45 W. State Street (some reports gave its address as 40 or 43 W. State). The building cost $55,000. Its opening included a series of events and celebrations, including a parade showing the evolution of road travel, reportedly including a Native American on a horse, an ox-cart pulled by oxen, a stagecoach, pony express, a tally-ho, Victorian phaeton, covered wagon, buck-board, horse and buggy, tandem bicycle, early automobiles and buses, a twin coach, and a then-modern Greyhound overnight coach. The new station had loading space for six buses, as well as a waiting room, ticket office, information desk, restrooms, and offices. The station was operated by the Pennsylvania Greyhound Co., a subsidiary of Greyhound Lines. Five days after the new station's opening, Union Bus Station operators filed a lawsuit against Greyhound, alleging that Greyhound and other companies already entered into a contract to utilize the Union Bus Station from 1929 to 1939.

On February 24, 1940, the Greyhound Terminal of Columbus opened at 81 E. Town St., at Town and 3rd streets' southwest corner. The new building was claimed to have the most complete layout of any Greyhound station, given thought-out passenger handling as well as an adjacent garage built to the rear of the station. The station was owned by the Pennsylvania, Ohio, and Atlantic Greyhound Lines. It featured a waiting room, restaurant, ticket offices, restrooms, bedrooms for dispatchers, a baggage room, and express office. By 1967, the station was owned by the Pontifical College Josephinum.

=== Current station ===
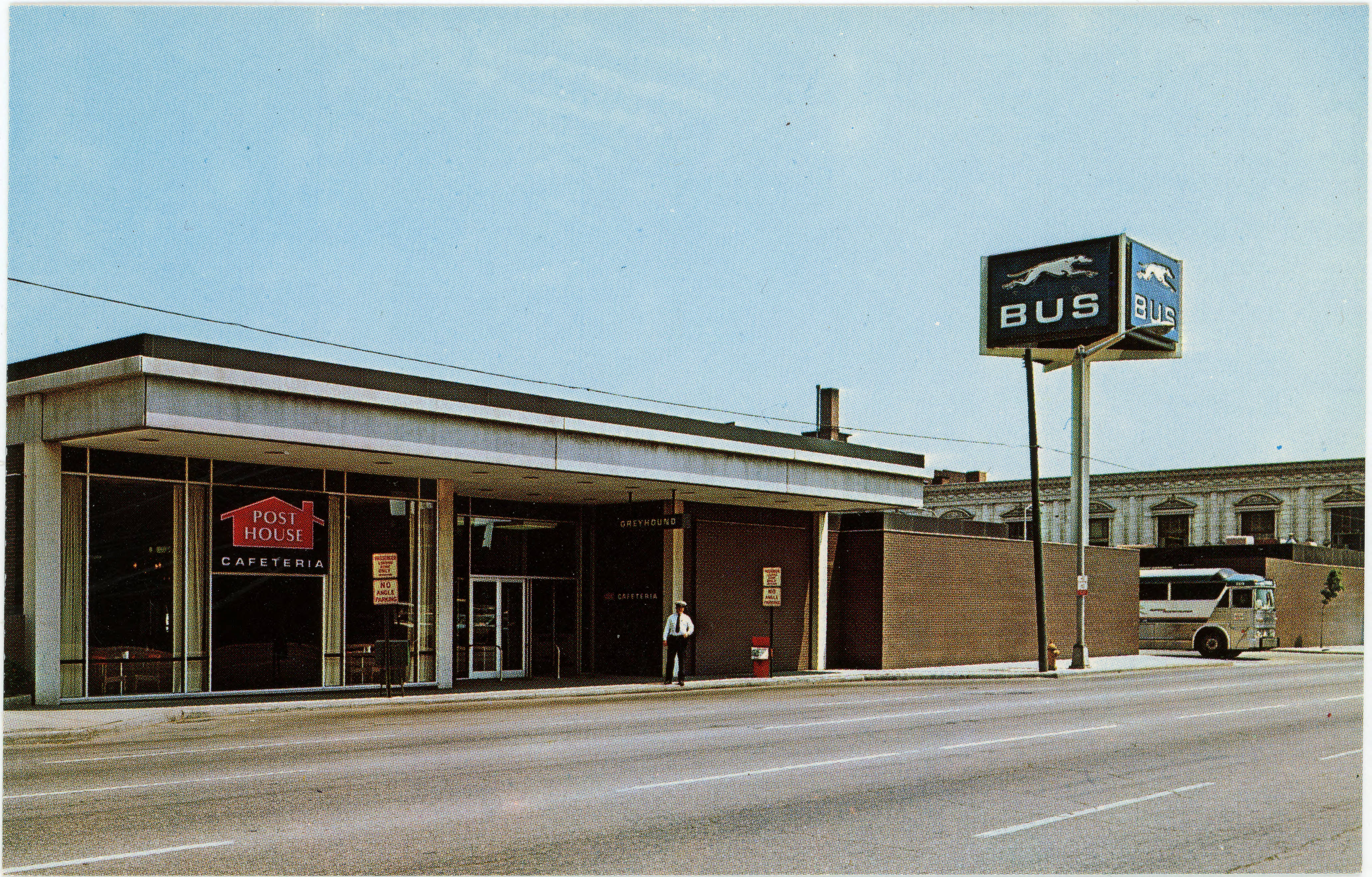
The Third Street side of the station included a streetside restaurant entrance

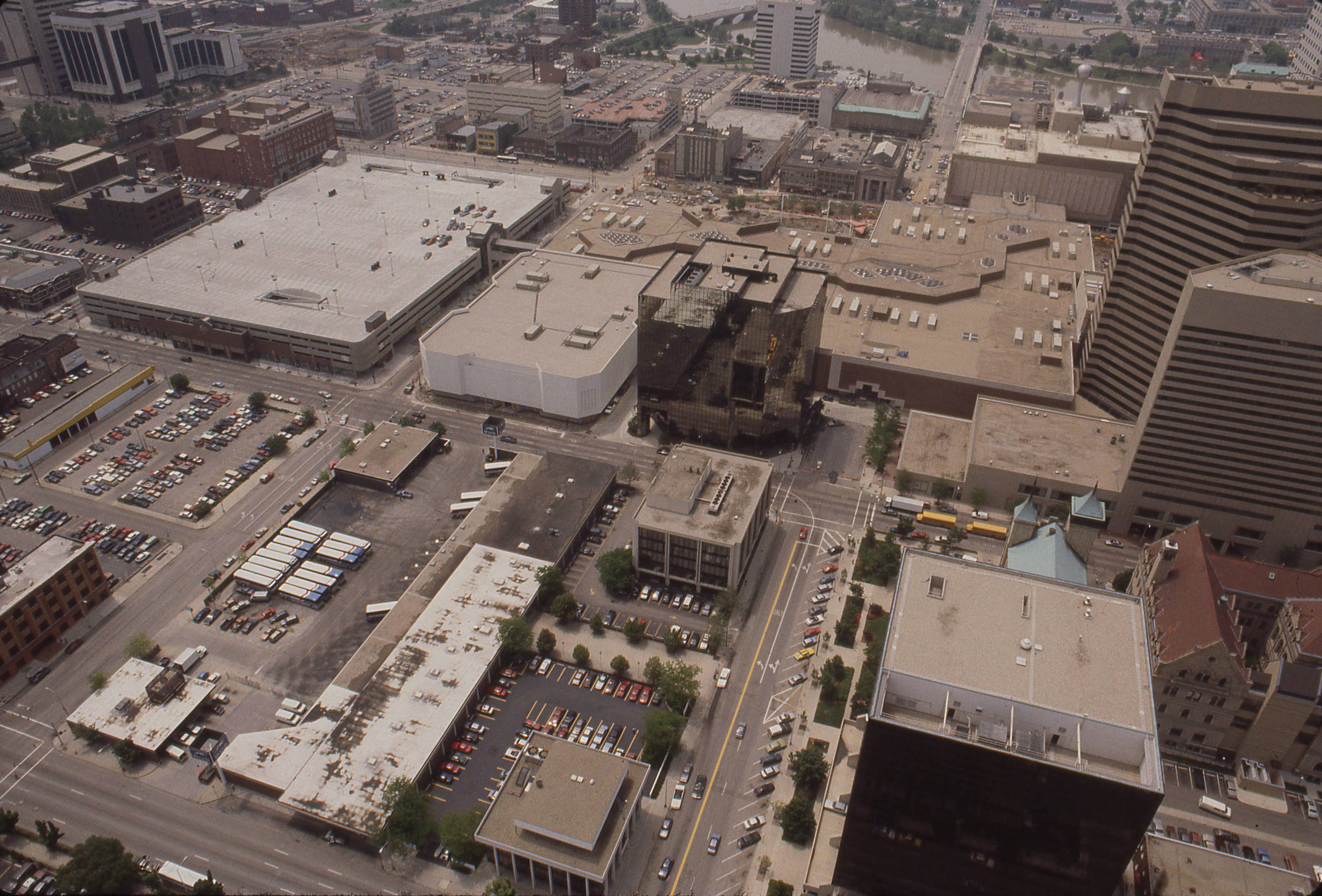
Aerial view of the station beside the Columbus City Center mall, 1990

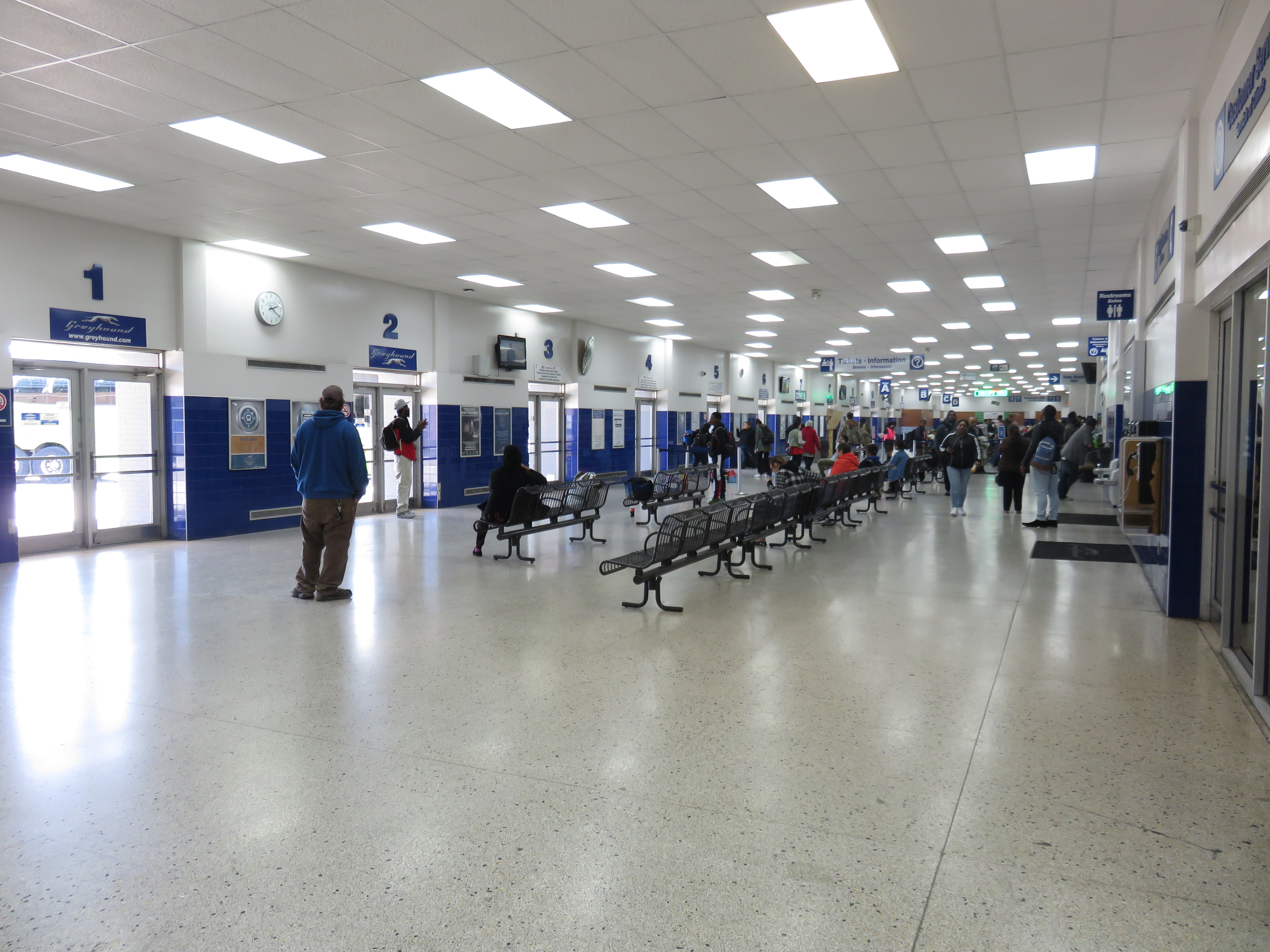
Station interior

Plans for a new Greyhound station were announced in 1967. The new station was developed as part of an urban renewal project in the Market-Mohawk redevelopment area. The project required the demolition of the historic Central Market and an A&P grocery store once used as the city's central interurban station, and owned by the Pontifical College Josephinum. Initial plans also called for a 1,000-vehicle parking garage atop the new station, though this plan was dropped in 1967, seen as not economically feasible, and given that there were 1,000 spots within a one-block distance of the terminal.

Ground broke for the station in 1968, and it opened on August 1, 1969. The new terminal cost $2.5 million, and was five times larger than the prior facility. At its opening, the station had general offices and a Travelers Aid station. Post House, a Greyhound restaurant subsidiary, operated a cafeteria, cocktail lounge, snack bar, gift shop, and game room in the new station.

By October 1969, a murder had already taken place outside the new station.

In 1972, Columbus policeman Thomas R. Stroud became known for keeping the station safe. Police and Greyhound officials were keen to keep the 1969 station clean and safe for visitors, as according to The Columbus Dispatch, the old station had "deteriorated into a haven for a variety of undesirables ranging from vagrants and drunks to deviates." Stroud began patrolling the station around April 1972, and arrested or ticketed 105 people within two months.

In 1988, the Greyhound Corporation proposed selling, leasing, or creating a joint-venture for the property. The corporation envisioned a multi-use space with office and retail functions, and potentially a hotel. At the time, the Columbus City Center mall was being constructed adjacent to the property. A 1988 feasibility study for the proposed Greater Columbus Convention Center suggested Greyhound Lines relocate there, which Greyhound officials supported.

In 1990, the Dial Corporation put the station up for sale, asking $4.2 million. Greyhound planned to move elsewhere in the city, preferably downtown, if the station building was sold. A local realty company began negotiations to purchase it in 1995, with the possibility of Greyhound relocating.

A 1995 article detailed the lack of security in the building, partially because all of its entrances were kept open. Homeless residents would stay there and use its coin-operated lockers, leading Greyhound to remove seats and replace the lockers with computer-coded ones with a higher user cost. By 2000, the station became a "gritty gathering point" for visitors, looking worn and grimy. At the time, it saw 1.4 million passengers travel through per year.

In July 2021, the station was the final filming site for Bones and All, a 2022 film starring Timothée Chalamet.

Throughout the early 21st century, the station has not been well maintained, and has attracted crime, including stabbings, gun-related complaints, drug overdoses, and assaults. Police made 1,200 visits to the station in 2020 and 300 in the first half of 2021, and often multiple times per day. A May 2021 shooting left a victim in critical condition. In June 2021, a city of Columbus attorney declared the property a public nuisance, requesting a hearing where the city could force the facility's closure for up to a year. An agreement made in the county municipal court required Greyhound to have at least two 24-hour private security guards, to maintain security cameras, and enforce additional security measures.

A few months later, in July, the Central Ohio Transit Authority (COTA) purchased the property for $9.4 million. The transit agency plans to demolish the bus station and create a multi-use development, including a transit center on-site, to serve regular buses in addition to planned east–west and northwest BRT routes. COTA officials believe transit should be a secondary feature of the new development. The city government and Columbus Downtown Development Corporation will partner in planning the site. The Columbus Dispatch reported that there are no plans to move the COTA headquarters there, though the agency's chief development officer suggested COTA could move its offices there and sell its current headquarters.

Intercity bus service was set to move to COTA's South Transit Terminal in fall 2021. The station operations moved on April 1, 2022. In June 2023, the station relocated to a former gas station on the city's west side. Since COTA's purchase of the old bus station, the site has sat vacant. COTA and the Columbus Downtown Development Corporation are planning an interim use of the property, likely to complement the nearby Columbus Commons park or to become an extension of the park. Meanwhile, Greyhound's west side station is facing code violations, and was ordered by the city to fix the violations by August 18, 2023, or risk closing. On October 8, 2023, a man was shot and killed at the Wilson Rd. station. A suspect was arrested on scene and was later charged with murder.

=== Strikes ===
Greyhound has a history of its workers going on strike. Some of these have affected service at the station, though a strike in 1941 across the Central Greyhound Lines did not directly affect Columbus, which at the time serviced only the Pennsylvania Greyhound Lines and the Ohio and Atlantic Lines.

An unauthorized strike took place in November 1971, a walkout by about 150 members of the Amalgamated Transit Union. The act halted service between Columbus and most local and major cities, though not on the Lake Shore Line, operated by an independent company.

== See also ==
- Social services and homelessness in Columbus, Ohio
- Public transit in Columbus, Ohio
