= Chenoweth, Ohio =

- Unincorporated community
- Location within Ohio Location within the United States
- Coordinates: 39°43′52″N 83°21′27″W
- Country: United States
- State: Ohio
- Counties: Madison
- Township: Range
- Elevation: 951 ft (290 m)
- Time zone: UTC-5 (Eastern (EST))
  - Summer (DST): UTC-4 (EDT)
- ZIP Code: 43143 (Mount Sterling)
- Area code: 740
- GNIS feature ID: 1056240

Chenoweth is an unincorporated community in Range Township, Madison County, Ohio, United States. It is located along Ohio State Route 323 between McClimansville and Range.

Chenoweth was never platted. The community has the name of John Chenoweth, a pioneer settler. The Chenoweth Post office was established on October 12, 1887, but was discontinued on September 15, 1900. The mail service is now sent through the Mount Sterling branch. As of 1915, the community contained one grocery store, one blacksmith, and a small cluster of houses.
