= Wrightsville, Madison County, Ohio =

Wrightsville, Ohio
- Unincorporated community
- Location within Ohio Location within the United States
- Coordinates: 39°51′40″N 83°14′50″W
- Country: United States
- State: Ohio
- Counties: Madison, Franklin
- Townships: Fairfield, Pleasant
- Elevation: 950 ft (290 m)
- Time zone: UTC-5 (Eastern (EST))
  - Summer (DST): UTC-4 (EDT)
- ZIP Codes: 43140 (London); 43123 (Grove City)
- Area code: 614
- GNIS feature ID: 2030260

Wrightsville is an unincorporated community in Fairfield Township, Madison County, and Pleasant Township, Franklin County, Ohio, United States. The center of the community is located at 39°51′40″N 83°14′50″W, at the intersection of Ohio State Route 665 and Georgesville-Wrightsville Road, approximately four miles (6.4 km) north of Kiousville and just west of the county line, with some of the community extending east into Franklin County.

== History ==
The Wrightsville Post Office was established on January 23, 1888, but was discontinued on January 15, 1901. The mail service is now sent through London for the Madison County portion of the community and through Grove City for the Franklin County portion.
