= Wrightsville, Ohio =

Wrightsville, Ohio, may refer to:

- Wrightsville, Adams County, Ohio
- Wrightsville, Madison County, Ohio
