= McKendree, Ohio =

- Unincorporated community
- Location within Ohio Location within the United States
- Coordinates: 39°47′09″N 83°16′19″W
- Country: United States
- State: Ohio
- Counties: Madison
- Township: Pleasant
- Elevation: 935 ft (285 m)
- Time zone: UTC-5 (Eastern (EST))
  - Summer (DST): UTC-4 (EDT)
- ZIP Code: 43143 (Mount Sterling)
- Area code: 740
- GNIS feature ID: 1048964

McKendree is an unincorporated community in Pleasant Township, Madison County, Ohio, United States. It is located at the intersection of Nioga-Toops Road and McKendree Road, southeast of Kiousville.
