= Madison Township, Clark County, Ohio =

Township in Ohio, US

- Township
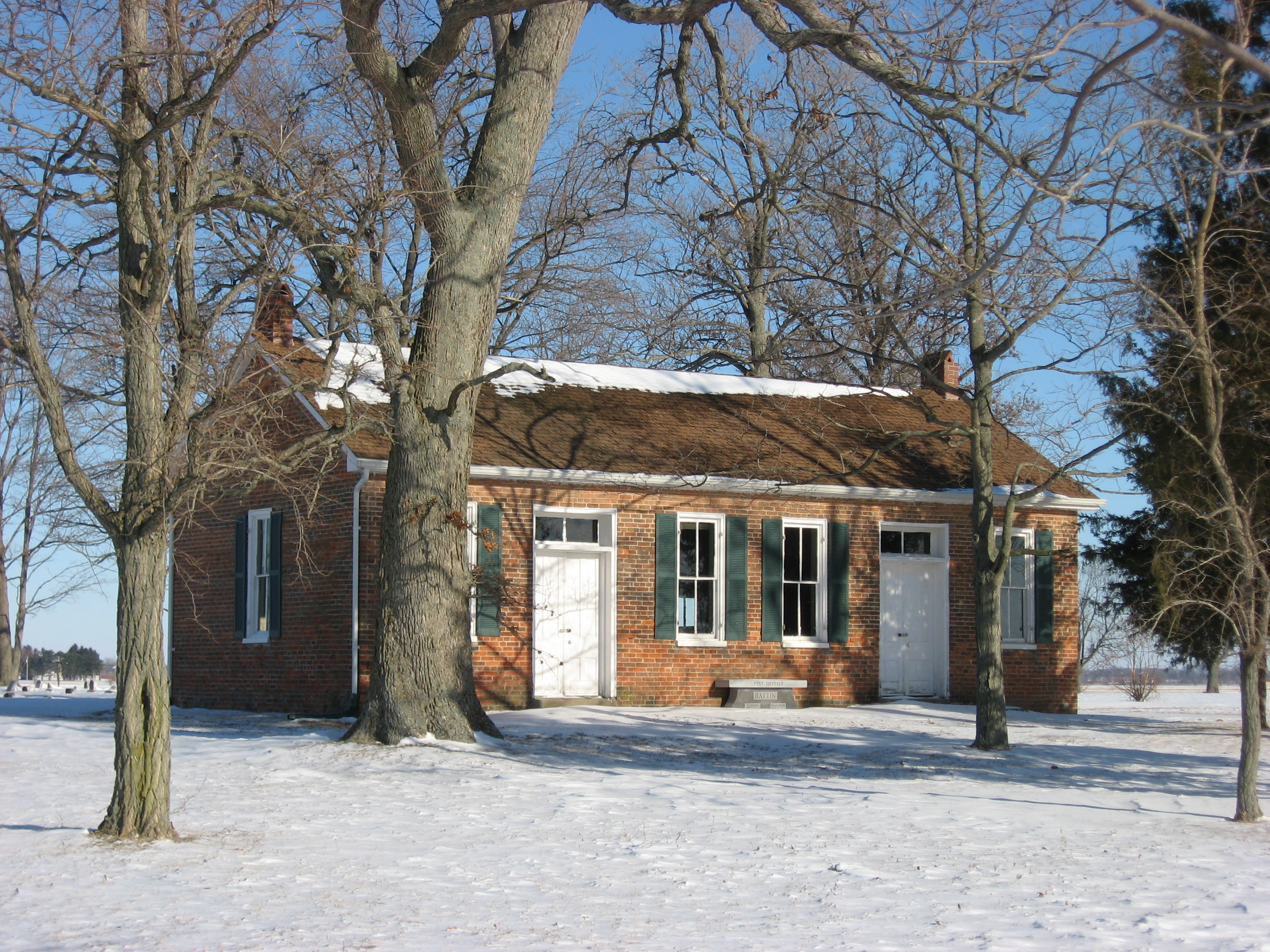
- The Green Plain Monthly Meetinghouse, a township landmark

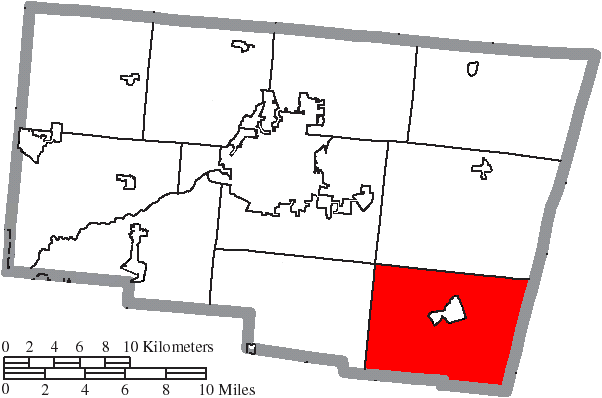
- Location of Madison Township in Clark County
- Coordinates: 39°49′13″N 83°38′35″W
- Country: United States
- State: Ohio
- County: Clark

Area
  - Total: 41.1 sq mi (106.5 km^{2})
  - Land: 41.1 sq mi (106.4 km^{2})
  - Water: 0.039 sq mi (0.1 km^{2})
- Elevation: 1,080 ft (330 m)

Population (2020)
  - Total: 2,532
  - Density: 61.63/sq mi (23.80/km^{2})
- Time zone: UTC-5 (Eastern (EST))
  - Summer (DST): UTC-4 (EDT)
- FIPS code: 39-46354
- GNIS feature ID: 1085854
- Website: https://www.madisontownshipoh.net/

Madison Township is one of the ten townships of Clark County, Ohio, United States. The 2020 census reported 2,532 people living in the township.

== Geography ==
Located in the southeastern corner of the county, it borders the following townships:

- Harmony Township - north
- Paint Township, Madison County - east
- Stokes Township, Madison County - southeast
- Ross Township, Greene County - south
- Cedarville Township, Greene County - southwest
- Green Township - west
- Springfield Township - northwest corner

The village of South Charleston is located in central Madison Township.

== Name and history ==
Madison Township is named after Madison County, Ohio.

It is one of twenty Madison Townships statewide.

== Government ==
The township is governed by a three-member board of trustees, who are elected in November of odd-numbered years to a four-year term beginning on the following January 1. Two are elected in the year after the presidential election and one is elected in the year before it. There is also an elected township fiscal officer, who serves a four-year term beginning on April 1 of the year after the election, which is held in November of the year before the presidential election. Vacancies in the fiscal officership or on the board of trustees are filled by the remaining trustees.
