= Resaca =

Resaca may refer to:

- Resaca (channel), a geographical feature in the Rio Grande basin, Texas, United States
- Resaca, Georgia, a city in Gordon County, Georgia, United States
- Resaca, Ohio, an unincorporated community in Madison County, Ohio, United States
- Battle of Resaca, a battle of the American Civil War fought in Georgia in May 1864
- Battle of Resaca de la Palma, a battle of the Mexican–American War fought in Texas in 1846
- USS Resaca (1865), an American navy ship
- Resaca, Spanish for hangover
- Resaca (film) a film by Alberto Santana, earliest sound film in Cinema of Peru
