= Florence, Ohio =

Florence, Ohio may refer to:

- Florence, Madison County, Ohio
- Florence Township, Erie County, Ohio
- Florence Township, Williams County, Ohio
- Munroe Falls, Ohio, which was originally called Florence from ca. 1817-1836
