= McKendree =

McKendree or MacKendree may refer to:

== People with the name ==
=== Surname ===
- Kevin McKendree (born 1969), American blues musician and songwriter
- William MacKendree, American artist
- William McKendree (1757–1835), American Methodist bishop

=== Given name ===
- McKendree Long (1888–1976), American minister and painter

== Places ==
- McKendree Township, Vermilion County, Illinois
- McKendree, Ohio
- McKendree, West Virginia

== Other uses ==
- McKendree Elementary School, an elementary school in Lawrenceville, Georgia
- McKendree University, a Methodist university in Lebanon, Illinois, US
- McKendree United Methodist Church, a United Methodist church in Nashville, Tennessee
- McKendree Chapel, a church in Jackson, Missouri

== See also ==
- McKendree Spring, an American musical band
- McKendree cylinder
