= California, Ohio =

California, Ohio may refer to:

- California, Cincinnati, a neighborhood within Cincinnati, Ohio
- Big Plain, Ohio, originally named California
