= Chrisman =

Chrisman may refer to:

- Chrisman (surname)
- Chrisman, Illinois, city in Edgar County, Illinois, United States
- Chrisman, Ohio, unincorporated community in Madison County, Ohio, United States
