= Stokes Township, Ohio =

Stokes Township, Ohio could refer to:

- Stokes Township, Logan County, Ohio
- Stokes Township, Madison County, Ohio
