= McClimansville, Ohio =

- Unincorporated community
- Location within Ohio Location within the United States
- Coordinates: 39°43′43″N 83°16′18″W
- Country: United States
- State: Ohio
- Counties: Madison
- Township: Pleasant
- Elevation: 912 ft (278 m)
- Time zone: UTC-5 (Eastern (EST))
  - Summer (DST): UTC-4 (EDT)
- ZIP Code: 43143 (Mount Sterling)
- Area code: 740
- GNIS feature ID: 1056415

McClimansville is an unincorporated community in Pleasant Township, Madison County, Ohio, United States. It is located at the intersection of Ohio State Route 323 and Ohio State Route 56, just north of Mount Sterling.
