= Warnersville =

Warnersville may refer to:

- Warnersville, a historically African American neighborhood of Greensboro, North Carolina established by Yardley Warner
- Former name of Trinidad, California
- Warnersville, an unincorporated village in Lycoming County, Pennsylvania
- Original name of Kiousville, Ohio
- According to accounts of John Ward Westcott's life, a village on Lime Island, Michigan where he was born
