= Big Plain, Ohio =

- Unincorporated community
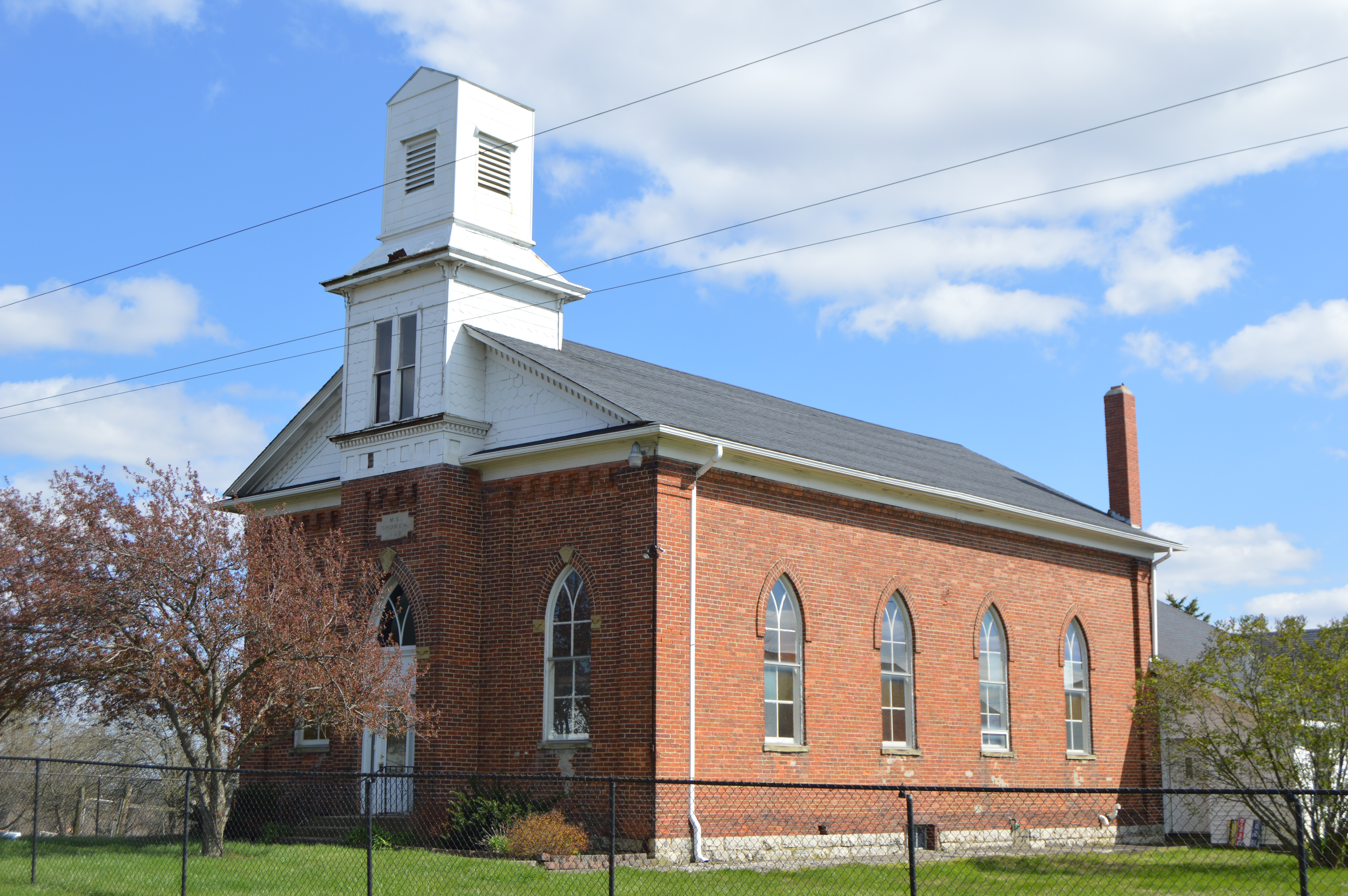
- Former Methodist church

- Location within Ohio Location within the United States
- Coordinates: 39°50′19″N 83°17′21″W
- Country: United States
- State: Ohio
- Counties: Madison
- Township: Fairfield
- Elevation: 984 ft (300 m)
- Time zone: UTC-5 (Eastern (EST))
  - Summer (DST): UTC-4 (EDT)
- ZIP Code: 43140 (London)
- Area code: 740
- GNIS feature ID: 1064437

Big Plain is an unincorporated community in Fairfield Township, Madison County, Ohio, United States. It is located at the intersection of West Jefferson-Kiousville Road and Big Plain-Circleville Road, approximately four miles north of Kiousville.

== History ==
The community was originally laid out by Thomas Chappel, Robert Thomas and William D. Pringle in the spring of 1849, and was then named California, after the recent gold rush in the state of the same name, and the community was later expanded by Pringle. As of 1875, the community had one church, two dry goods stores, one drug store, two blacksmith and wagon shops, two physicians, and one shoe shop. Due to there already being a post office named California elsewhere in the state, the Big Plain Post Office was established on June 17, 1850, named after large prairies in the area known as the "Big Plains". To prevent any confusion, the name of the community was changed to match the name of the post office some time between 1875 and 1905. The post office was discontinued on December 14, 1905. The mail service is now sent through the London branch. As of 1915, the community contained a church, a Knights of Pythias lodge, and the township hall.

== Demographics ==
As of 1875, the population was about 125, and as of 1915, the population was 200.
