= Rupert, Ohio =

- Unincorporated community
- Location within Ohio Location within the United States
- Coordinates: 39°52′57″N 83°21′12″W
- Country: United States
- State: Ohio
- County: Madison
- Township: Union
- Elevation: 961 ft (293 m)
- Time zone: UTC-5 (Eastern (EST))
  - Summer (DST): UTC-4 (EDT)
- ZIP Code: 43140 (London)
- Area code: 740
- GNIS feature ID: 1062997

Rupert is an unincorporated community in Union Township, Madison County, Ohio, United States. It is located at the intersection of Ohio State Route 665 and Glade Run Road, approximately four miles east of London.

The Rupert Post Office was established on May 2, 1894, but was discontinued on August 31, 1901. The mail service is now sent through the London branch. As of 1915, the community contained a general store, a blacksmith, and only a few houses.
