= Madison County, Ohio =

County in Ohio, United States

- County
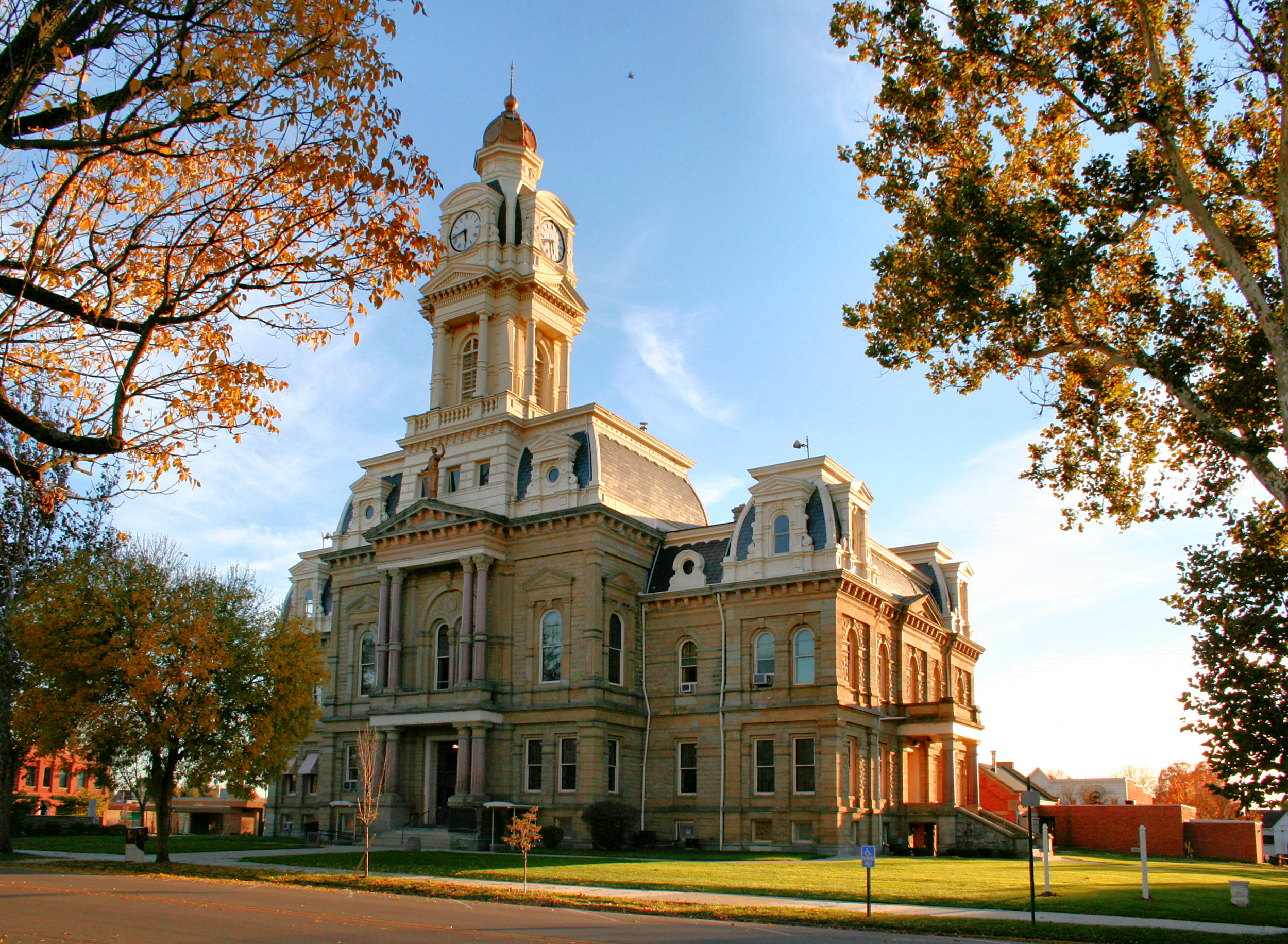
- Madison County Courthouse

- Flag Seal

- Location within the U.S. state of Ohio
- Coordinates: 39°54′N 83°24′W
- Country: United States
- State: Ohio
- Founded: February 16, 1810
- Named for: James Madison
- Seat: London
- Largest city: London

Area
  - Total: 467 sq mi (1,210 km^{2})
  - Land: 466 sq mi (1,210 km^{2})
  - Water: 0.8 sq mi (2.1 km^{2}) 0.2%

Population (2020)
  - Total: 43,824
  - Estimate (2025): 46,985 ▲
  - Density: 94.0/sq mi (36.3/km^{2})
- Time zone: UTC−5 (Eastern)
  - Summer (DST): UTC−4 (EDT)
- Congressional district: 15th
- Website: www.co.madison.oh.us

Madison County is a county located in the central portion of the U.S. state of Ohio. As of the 2020 census, the population was 43,824. Its county seat is London. The county is named for James Madison, President of the United States and was established on March 1, 1810. Madison County is part of the Columbus, OH Metropolitan Statistical Area.

== History ==
In 1850, Madison County contained 24 churches and one newspaper office, had a total population of 10,015, and the county's public school system had 3838 pupils. With agriculture as the primary business, that same year the county produced 726,451 bushels of corn, 19,308 tons of hay, 120,696 pounds of wool, and 128,948 pounds of butter. In 1900, the county had a population of 20,590.

In November 1949, the remains of a Mastodon were discovered at Orleton Farms in Madison County, approximately 11.5 mi (18.5 km) northwest of West Jefferson. The discovery was made when workmen were locating a clogged drain on the farm with an iron rod. The farm reported the findings to the Ohio Historical Society, who then sent out a team to recover the bones. Later, in January of 1952, five different articles were released detailing the Orleton Mastodon and multiple experts' interpretations of the findings.

In 2008, Madison County, which spans Interstates 70 and 71 as they converge on Columbus, was cited by the Ohio State Highway Patrol as leading the state for the most speeding tickets 20-mph or more over the posted limit. Despite a population of around 42,000 in 2006, over 7,700 such tickets were issued in three years. Three of Madison County's 18 fatal crashes in 2006 and 2007 occurred on interstates. Madison County is also home to the Ohio Peace Officer Training Academy, the Ohio Bureau of Criminal Identification & Investigation, and several prison facilities.

== Geography ==
According to the U.S. Census Bureau, the county has a total area of 467 square miles (1,210 km^{2}), of which 466 square miles (1,210 km^{2}) is land and 0.8 square miles (2.1 km^{2}) (0.2%) is water.

=== Adjacent counties ===
- Union County (north)
- Franklin County (east)
- Pickaway County (southeast)
- Fayette County (south)
- Greene County (southwest)
- Clark County (west)
- Champaign County (northwest)

== Demographics ==
Historical population
Census	Pop.	Note	%±
1810	1,603		—
1820	4,799		199.4%
1830	6,190		29.0%
1840	9,025		45.8%
1850	10,015		11.0%
1860	13,015		30.0%
1870	15,633		20.1%
1880	20,129		28.8%
1890	20,057		−0.4%
1900	20,590		2.7%
1910	19,902		−3.3%
1920	19,662		−1.2%
1930	20,253		3.0%
1940	21,811		7.7%
1950	22,300		2.2%
1960	26,454		18.6%
1970	28,318		7.0%
1980	33,004		16.5%
1990	37,068		12.3%
2000	40,213		8.5%
2010	43,435		8.0%
2020	43,824		0.9%
2025 (est.)	46,985	▲	7.2%
U.S. Decennial Census; 1790-1960 1900-1990; 1990-2000 2020

=== 2020 census ===
Madison County, Ohio – Racial and ethnic composition Note: the US Census treats Hispanic/Latino as an ethnic category. This table excludes Latinos from the racial categories and assigns them to a separate category. Hispanics/Latinos may be of any race.
Race / Ethnicity (NH = Non-Hispanic)	Pop 1980	Pop 1990	Pop 2000	Pop 2010	Pop 2020	% 1980	% 1990	% 2000	% 2010	% 2020
White alone (NH)	31,169	33,837	36,744	38,994	37,761	94.44%	91.28%	91.37%	89.78%	86.17%
Black or African American alone (NH)	1,516	2,739	2,505	2,852	2,664	4.59%	7.39%	6.23%	6.57%	6.08%
Native American or Alaska Native alone (NH)	31	90	79	88	59	0.09%	0.24%	0.20%	0.20%	0.13%
Asian alone (NH)	75	148	175	231	253	0.23%	0.40%	0.44%	0.53%	0.58%
Native Hawaiian or Pacific Islander alone (NH)	x	x	6	8	4	x	x	0.01%	0.02%	0.01%
Other race alone (NH)	47	38	40	53	176	0.14%	0.10%	0.10%	0.12%	0.40%
Mixed race or Multiracial (NH)	x	x	370	587	1,644	x	x	0.92%	1.35%	3.75%
Hispanic or Latino (any race)	166	216	294	622	1,263	0.50%	0.58%	0.73%	1.43%	2.88%
Total	33,004	37,068	40,213	43,435	43,824	100.00%	100.00%	100.00%	100.00%	100.00%

As of the 2020 census, the county had a population of 43,824, and the median age was 41.1 years. 21.0% of residents were under the age of 18 and 16.4% of residents were 65 years of age or older. For every 100 females there were 120.0 males, and for every 100 females age 18 and over there were 125.5 males age 18 and over.

The racial makeup of the county was 86.8% White, 6.1% Black or African American, 0.2% American Indian and Alaska Native, 0.6% Asian, <0.1% Native Hawaiian and Pacific Islander, 1.5% from some other race, and 4.8% from two or more races. Hispanic or Latino residents of any race comprised 2.9% of the population.

33.8% of residents lived in urban areas, while 66.2% lived in rural areas.

There were 15,234 households in the county, of which 31.4% had children under the age of 18 living in them. Of all households, 51.9% were married-couple households, 17.0% were households with a male householder and no spouse or partner present, and 23.3% were households with a female householder and no spouse or partner present. About 25.1% of all households were made up of individuals and 11.8% had someone living alone who was 65 years of age or older. There were 16,216 housing units, of which 6.1% were vacant. Among occupied housing units, 73.5% were owner-occupied and 26.5% were renter-occupied. The homeowner vacancy rate was 1.2% and the rental vacancy rate was 4.5%.

=== 2010 census ===
As of the 2010 United States census, there were 43,435 people, 14,734 households, and 10,580 families living in the county. The population density was 93.2 inhabitants per square mile (36.0/km^{2}). There were 15,939 housing units at an average density of 34.2 units per square mile (13.2 units/km^{2}). The racial makeup of the county was 90.6% white, 6.6% black or African American, 0.5% Asian, 0.2% American Indian, 0.5% from other races, and 1.5% from two or more races. Those of Hispanic or Latino origin made up 1.4% of the population. In terms of ancestry, 32.0% were German, 16.5% were Irish, 14.5% were American, and 9.6% were English.

Of the 14,734 households, 34.1% had children under the age of 18 living with them, 55.4% were married couples living together, 11.3% had a female householder with no husband present, 28.2% were non-families, and 23.5% of all households were made up of individuals. The average household size was 2.59 and the average family size was 3.04. The median age was 39.1 years.

The median income for a household in the county was $50,533 and the median income for a family was $63,397. Males had a median income of $46,550 versus $33,193 for females. The per capita income for the county was $23,980. About 8.9% of families and 11.7% of the population were below the poverty line, including 16.1% of those under age 18 and 6.1% of those age 65 or over.

=== 2000 census ===
As of the census of 2000, there were 40,213 people, 13,672 households, and 10,035 families living in the county. The population density was 86 inhabitants per square mile (33/km^{2}). There were 14,399 housing units at an average density of 31 units per square mile (12/km^{2}). The racial makeup of the county was 91.75% White, 6.24% Black or African American, 0.20% Native American, 0.44% Asian, 0.01% Pacific Islander, 0.35% from other races, and 1.01% from two or more races. 0.73% of the population were Hispanic or Latino of any race.

There were 13,672 households, out of which 35.20% had children under the age of 18 living with them, 59.20% were married couples living together, 9.90% had a female householder with no husband present, and 26.60% were non-families. 22.30% of all households were made up of individuals, and 9.50% had someone living alone who was 65 years of age or older. The average household size was 2.62 and the average family size was 3.06.

In the county, the population was spread out, with 24.70% under the age of 18, 9.10% from 18 to 24, 32.80% from 25 to 44, 22.60% from 45 to 64, and 10.90% who were 65 years of age or older. The median age was 36 years. For every 100 females there were 117.00 males. For every 100 females age 18 and over, there were 121.30 males.

The median income for a household in the county was $44,212, and the median income for a family was $50,520. Males had a median income of $35,251 versus $26,119 for females. The per capita income for the county was $18,721. About 6.20% of families and 7.80% of the population were below the poverty line, including 10.50% of those under age 18 and 8.70% of those age 65 or over.

== Politics ==
Madison County is a Republican stronghold county in presidential elections. The only two Democrats to win the county were Franklin D. Roosevelt in 1932 & 1936 and Lyndon B. Johnson in 1964.

United States presidential election results for Madison County, Ohio
Year	Republican		Democratic		Third party(ies)	
Year	No.	%	No.	%	No.	%
1856	997	46.85%	656	30.83%	475	22.32%
1860	1,417	53.03%	1,016	38.02%	239	8.94%
1864	1,688	58.94%	1,176	41.06%	0	0.00%
1868	1,682	52.04%	1,550	47.96%	0	0.00%
1872	1,934	54.25%	1,625	45.58%	6	0.17%
1876	2,191	50.24%	2,145	49.19%	25	0.57%
1880	2,680	53.09%	2,305	45.66%	63	1.25%
1884	2,706	52.28%	2,391	46.19%	79	1.53%
1888	2,708	50.71%	2,376	44.49%	256	4.79%
1892	2,594	50.93%	2,292	45.00%	207	4.06%
1896	3,308	54.01%	2,751	44.91%	66	1.08%
1900	3,197	55.58%	2,493	43.34%	62	1.08%
1904	3,164	59.07%	2,103	39.26%	89	1.66%
1908	3,051	54.93%	2,430	43.75%	73	1.31%
1912	2,271	43.37%	2,172	41.48%	793	15.15%
1916	2,809	50.92%	2,667	48.35%	40	0.73%
1920	5,397	58.76%	3,769	41.03%	19	0.21%
1924	4,829	61.97%	2,685	34.46%	278	3.57%
1928	5,522	68.13%	2,527	31.18%	56	0.69%
1932	4,631	49.13%	4,722	50.10%	73	0.77%
1936	4,843	47.81%	5,184	51.17%	103	1.02%
1940	5,904	57.35%	4,390	42.65%	0	0.00%
1944	5,546	62.17%	3,374	37.83%	0	0.00%
1948	4,730	58.44%	3,356	41.46%	8	0.10%
1952	6,279	66.40%	3,177	33.60%	0	0.00%
1956	6,483	69.28%	2,875	30.72%	0	0.00%
1960	7,256	66.37%	3,677	33.63%	0	0.00%
1964	4,945	48.44%	5,264	51.56%	0	0.00%
1968	5,882	57.15%	2,780	27.01%	1,631	15.85%
1972	8,372	75.67%	2,484	22.45%	208	1.88%
1976	7,074	58.17%	4,885	40.17%	202	1.66%
1980	7,166	63.14%	3,565	31.41%	619	5.45%
1984	8,979	74.91%	2,928	24.43%	80	0.67%
1988	8,303	70.26%	3,421	28.95%	93	0.79%
1992	6,865	48.79%	3,998	28.41%	3,208	22.80%
1996	6,871	51.20%	5,072	37.79%	1,478	11.01%
2000	8,892	60.63%	5,287	36.05%	488	3.33%
2004	11,117	63.90%	6,203	35.65%	78	0.45%
2008	10,606	60.57%	6,532	37.30%	372	2.12%
2012	10,342	58.91%	6,845	38.99%	370	2.11%
2016	11,631	66.76%	4,779	27.43%	1,011	5.80%
2020	13,835	69.57%	5,698	28.65%	354	1.78%
2024	14,737	70.98%	5,713	27.52%	312	1.50%

United States Senate election results for Madison County, Ohio1
Year	Republican		Democratic		Third party(ies)	
Year	No.	%	No.	%	No.	%
2024	13,347	65.24%	6,322	30.90%	789	3.86%

== Education ==
=== Primary and secondary schools ===
School districts include:

- Fairbanks Local School District
- Jefferson Local School District
- Jonathan Alder Local School District
- London City School District
- Madison-Plains Local School District
- Mechanicsburg Exempted Village School District

=== Libraries ===
The following libraries serve the communities of Madison County.

- Hurt/Battelle Memorial Library in West Jefferson
- London Public Library in London
- Mount Sterling Public Library in Mount Sterling
- Plain City Public Library in Plain City

== Transportation ==
=== Airports ===
The Madison County Airport is located three nautical miles (3.5 mi; 5.6 km) north of London's central business district.

=== Major highways ===
- I-70
- I-71
- US 40
- US 42
- US 62
- SR 3
- SR 29
- SR 38
- SR 41
- SR 56
- SR 142
- SR 161
- SR 187
- SR 207
- SR 323
- SR 665
- SR 729

== Communities ==
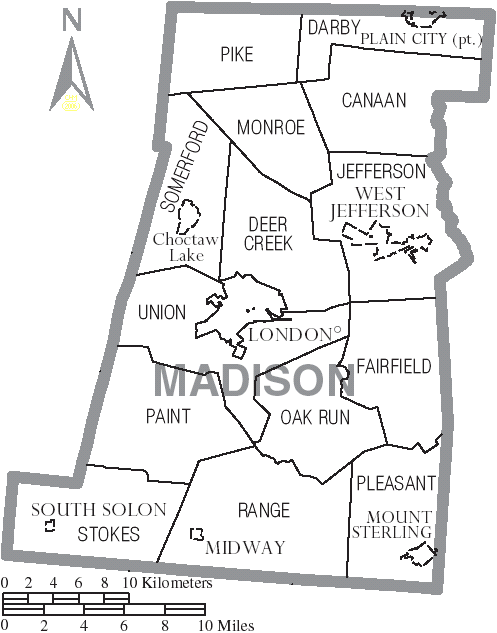
Map of Madison County, Ohio with Municipal and Township Labels

=== Cities ===
- London (county seat)
- Dublin (Part)

=== Villages ===
- Midway
- Mount Sterling
- Plain City
- South Solon
- West Jefferson

=== Townships ===
- Canaan
- Darby
- Deer Creek
- Fairfield
- Jefferson
- Monroe
- Oak Run
- Paint
- Pike
- Pleasant
- Range
- Somerford
- Stokes
- Union

=== Census-designated places ===
- Choctaw Lake
- Lafayette
- Plumwood

=== Unincorporated communities ===
- Amity
- Big Plain
- Chenoweth
- Chrisman
- Florence
- Gillivan
- Kileville
- Kiousville
- Lilly Chapel
- Madison Lake
- McClimansville
- McKendree
- Newport
- Range
- Resaca
- Rosedale
- Rupert
- Summerford
- Tradersville
- Wrightsville

== See also ==
- Madison Lake State Park – Park in Ohio, USA
- National Register of Historic Places listings in Madison County, Ohio
