= Chrisman, Ohio =

- Unincorporated community
- Location within Ohio Location within the United States
- Coordinates: 39°49′59″N 83°22′22″W
- Country: United States
- State: Ohio
- Counties: Madison
- Township: Oak Run
- Elevation: 991 ft (302 m)
- Time zone: UTC-5 (Eastern (EST))
  - Summer (DST): UTC-4 (EDT)
- ZIP Code: 43143 (Mount Sterling)
- Area code: 740
- GNIS feature ID: 1048601

Chrisman is an unincorporated community in Oak Run Township, Madison County, Ohio, United States. It is located at the intersection of London-Circleville Road (State Route 56) and Gregg Mill Road (Township Highway 100), about four miles southeast of London.

Chrisman was never platted. The Chrisman Post office was established on October 16, 1896, but was discontinued on October 31, 1901. The mail service is now sent through the London branch. As of 1915, the community contained little more than a few houses.
