= Deer Creek Township, Madison County, Ohio =

Township in Ohio, US

- Township
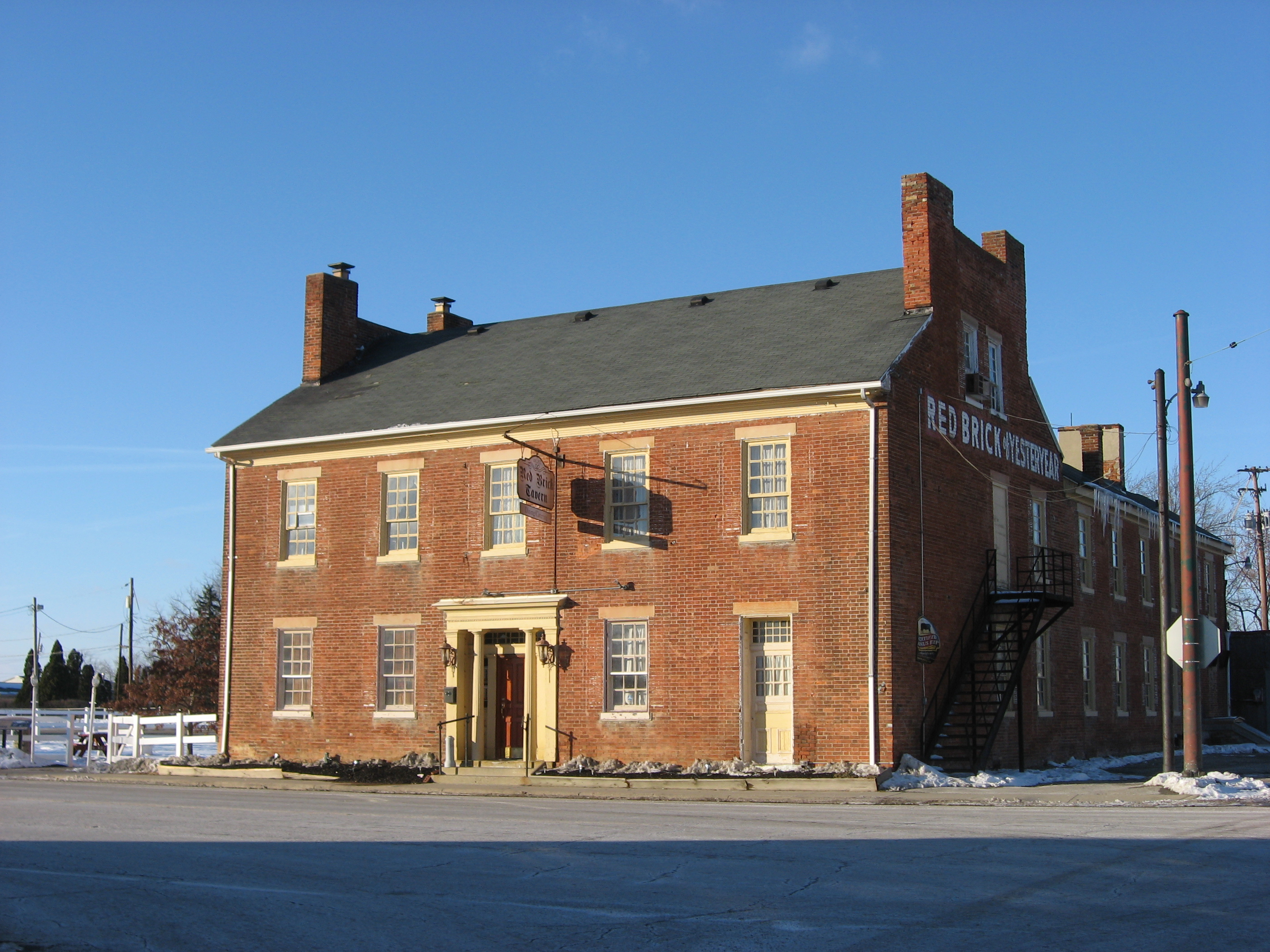
- The Red Brick Tavern in Lafayette

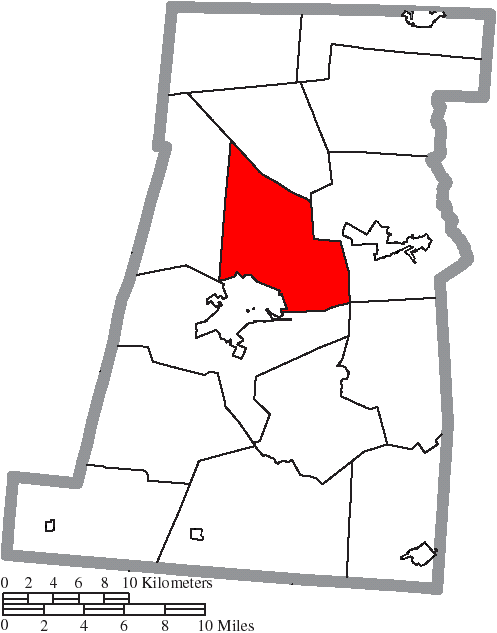
- Location of Deer Creek Township in Madison County
- Coordinates: 39°56′11″N 83°24′12″W
- Country: United States
- State: Ohio
- County: Madison

Area
  - Total: 31.0 sq mi (80.2 km^{2})
  - Land: 30.9 sq mi (80.1 km^{2})
  - Water: 0.039 sq mi (0.1 km^{2})
- Elevation: 1,010 ft (308 m)

Population (2020)
  - Total: 967
  - Density: 31.3/sq mi (12.1/km^{2})
- Time zone: UTC-5 (Eastern (EST))
  - Summer (DST): UTC-4 (EDT)
- FIPS code: 39-21154
- GNIS feature ID: 1086542

Deer Creek Township is one of the fourteen townships of Madison County, Ohio, United States. The 2020 census found 967 people in the township.

== Geography ==
Located in the central part of the county, it borders the following townships:

- Monroe Township - north
- Jefferson Township - east
- Fairfield Township - southeast corner
- Union Township - south
- Somerford Township - west

Part of the city of London, the county seat of Madison County, is located in Deer Creek Township. The Census-designated place of Lafayette lies northeast of London on U.S. Route 40.

The London Country Club is located within the township.

The Molly Caren Agricultural Center, operated by the Ohio State University, lies at the crossroads of SR 38 and U.S. 40 within the township.

The runway of the Madison County Airport ends in the township. The Silent P aerodrome (OA86) is located fully within the township.

== Name and history ==
As of 1854, the population of the township was 583, 894 in 1890, 882 in 1900, and 883 in 1910. Statewide, the only other Deer Creek Township is located in Pickaway County.

The township is named after the eponymous creek which flows through the township. A sizeable tributary of the Deer Creek flows north-south in the township's far east.

== Government ==
The township is governed by a three-member board of trustees, who are elected in November of odd-numbered years to a four-year term beginning on the following January 1. Two are elected in the year after the presidential election and one is elected in the year before it. There is also an elected township fiscal officer, who serves a four-year term beginning on April 1 of the year after the election, which is held in November of the year before the presidential election. Vacancies in the fiscal officership or on the board of trustees are filled by the remaining trustees.
