= Florence, Madison County, Ohio =

Florence, Ohio
- Unincorporated community
- Location within Ohio Location within the United States
- Coordinates: 39°50′52″N 83°32′50″W
- Country: United States
- State: Ohio
- Counties: Madison
- Township: Paint
- Elevation: 1,145 ft (349 m)
- Time zone: UTC-5 (Eastern (EST))
  - Summer (DST): UTC-4 (EDT)
- ZIP Code: 43140 (London)
- Area code: 740
- GNIS feature ID: 1062768

Florence is an unincorporated community in Paint Township, Madison County, Ohio, United States. It is located along U.S. Route 42 between London and South Charleston.

Florence was never platted; the community simply grew around a station built on the Pennsylvania Railroad. As of 1915, the community contained one grain elevator, one general store, the railroad station and freight depot, and only a few houses.
