= Tradersville, Ohio =

- Unincorporated community
- Location within Ohio Location within the United States
- Coordinates: 40°00′00″N 83°29′55″W
- Country: United States
- State: Ohio
- Counties: Madison
- Township: Somerford
- Elevation: 1,102 ft (336 m)
- Time zone: UTC-5 (Eastern (EST))
  - Summer (DST): UTC-4 (EDT)
- ZIP Codes: 43140 (London); 43044 (Mechanicsburg)
- Area code: 740
- GNIS feature ID: 1047126

Tradersville is an unincorporated community in Somerford Township, Madison County, Ohio, United States.

As of 1875, Tradersville contained one dry goods and grocery store, a post office, and a blacksmith shop.

The Tradersville Post office was established on March 2, 1848 and discontinued on January 19, 1883. It was then reestablished on January 24, 1900, and discontinued yet again on August 31, 1901. The mail service is now sent through the London branch.
