= Gillivan, Ohio =

- Unincorporated community
- Location within Ohio Location within the United States
- Coordinates: 39°59′19″N 83°20′13″W
- Country: United States
- State: Ohio
- Counties: Madison
- Township: Jefferson
- Elevation: 978 ft (298 m)
- Time zone: UTC-5 (Eastern (EST))
  - Summer (DST): UTC-4 (EDT)
- ZIP Code: 43162 (West Jefferson)
- Area code: 614
- GNIS feature ID: 1048783

Gillivan is an unincorporated community in Jefferson Township, Madison County, Ohio, United States. It is located along U.S. Route 42, north of its intersection with Ohio State Route 29.

The community was never actually laid out, but simply formed around a crossroads. As of 1915, the community contained one general store, one hardware store, one blacksmith, and only six houses.
