= Darby Township, Pickaway County, Ohio =

Township in Ohio, US

- Township
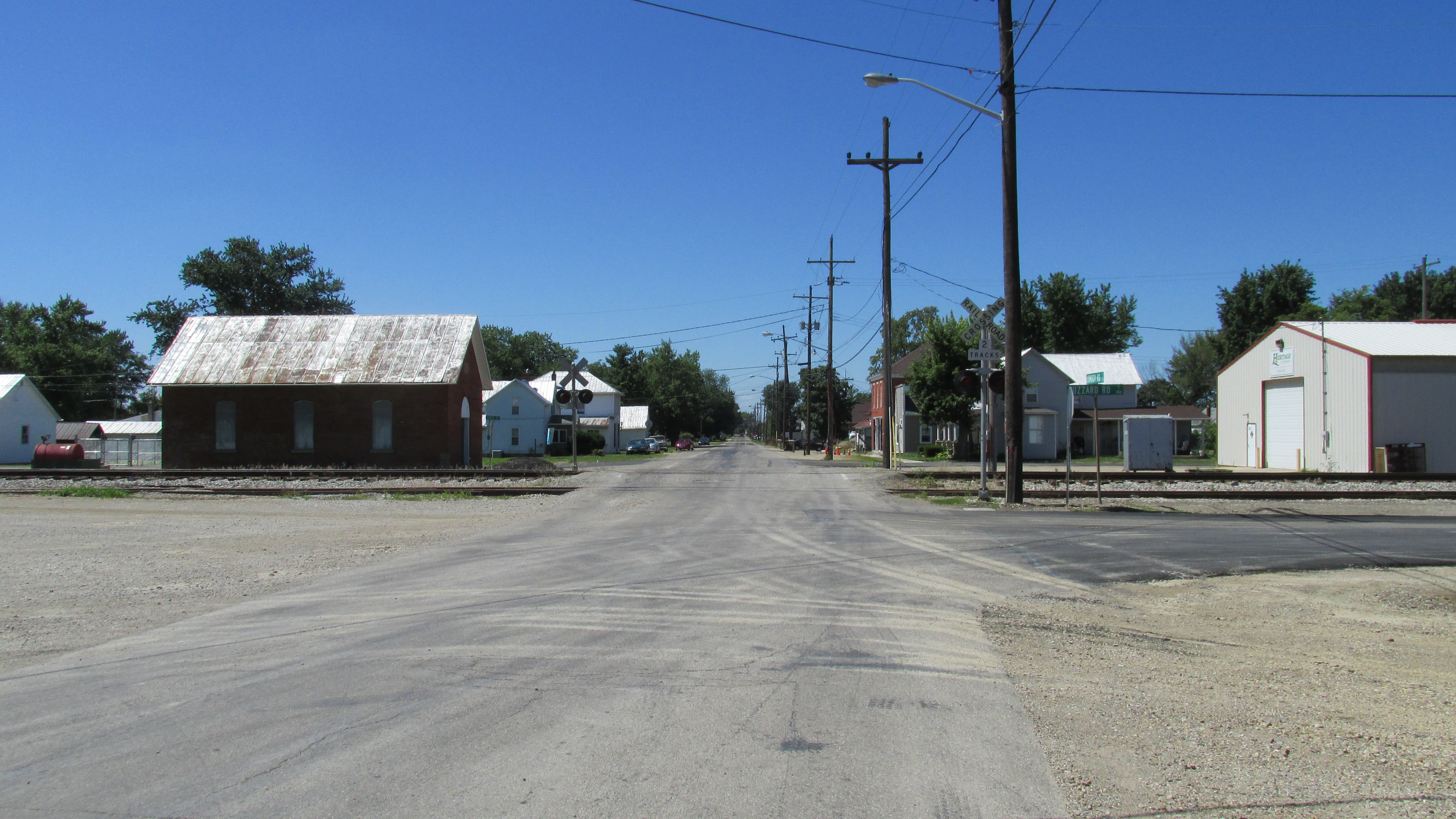
- Scene in Derby

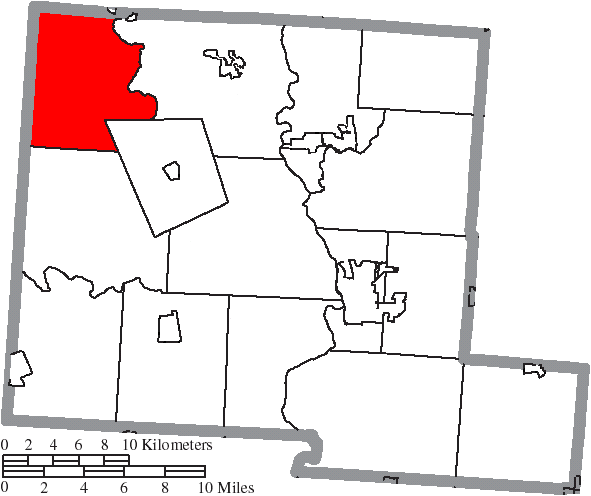
- Location of Darby Township in Pickaway County
- Coordinates: 39°46′9″N 83°11′21″W
- Country: United States
- State: Ohio
- County: Pickaway

Area
  - Total: 34.4 sq mi (89.2 km^{2})
  - Land: 34.3 sq mi (88.8 km^{2})
  - Water: 0.12 sq mi (0.3 km^{2})
- Elevation: 909 ft (277 m)

Population (2020)
  - Total: 3,213
  - Density: 94/sq mi (36.2/km^{2})
- Time zone: UTC-5 (Eastern (EST))
  - Summer (DST): UTC-4 (EDT)
- FIPS code: 39-20156
- GNIS feature ID: 1086793
- Website: https://www.darbytownship.us/

Darby Township is one of the fifteen townships of Pickaway County, Ohio, United States. The 2020 census found 3,213 people in the township.

== Geography ==
Located in the northwestern corner of the county, it borders the following townships:

- Pleasant Township, Franklin County - north
- Scioto Township - east
- Muhlenberg Township - southeast
- Monroe Township - south
- Pleasant Township, Madison County - west
- Fairfield Township, Madison County - northwest

Part of the village of Harrisburg is located in northern Darby Township, and the census-designated place of Derby lies in the center of the township.

== Name and history ==
Statewide, other Darby Townships are located in Madison and Union Counties.

Darby Township was settled chiefly by emigrants from Virginia.

== Government ==
The township is governed by a three-member board of trustees, who are elected in November of odd-numbered years to a four-year term beginning on the following January 1. Two are elected in the year after the presidential election and one is elected in the year before it. There is also an elected township fiscal officer, who serves a four-year term beginning on April 1 of the year after the election, which is held in November of the year before the presidential election. Vacancies in the fiscal officership or on the board of trustees are filled by the remaining trustees.
