= Kileville, Ohio =

- Unincorporated community
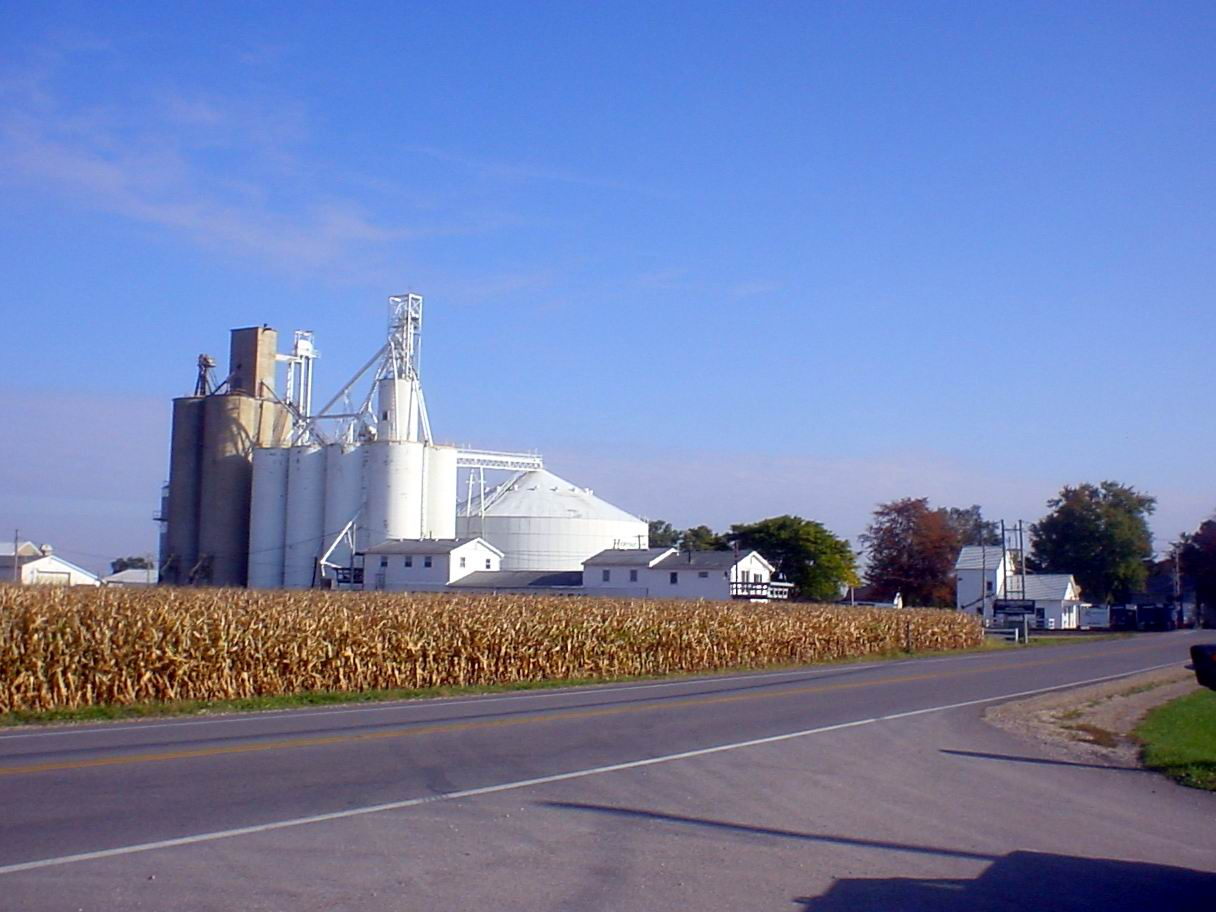
- Skyline of Kileville

- Location within Ohio Location within the United States
- Coordinates: 40°06′16″N 83°12′39″W
- Country: United States
- State: Ohio
- Counties: Madison
- Township: Darby
- Elevation: 951 ft (290 m)
- Time zone: UTC-5 (Eastern (EST))
  - Summer (DST): UTC-4 (EDT)
- ZIP Code: 43064 (Plain City)
- Area code: 614
- GNIS feature ID: 1064933

Kileville is an unincorporated community in Darby Township, Madison County, Ohio, United States. It is located along Ohio State Route 161, between Plain City and Dublin.

== History ==
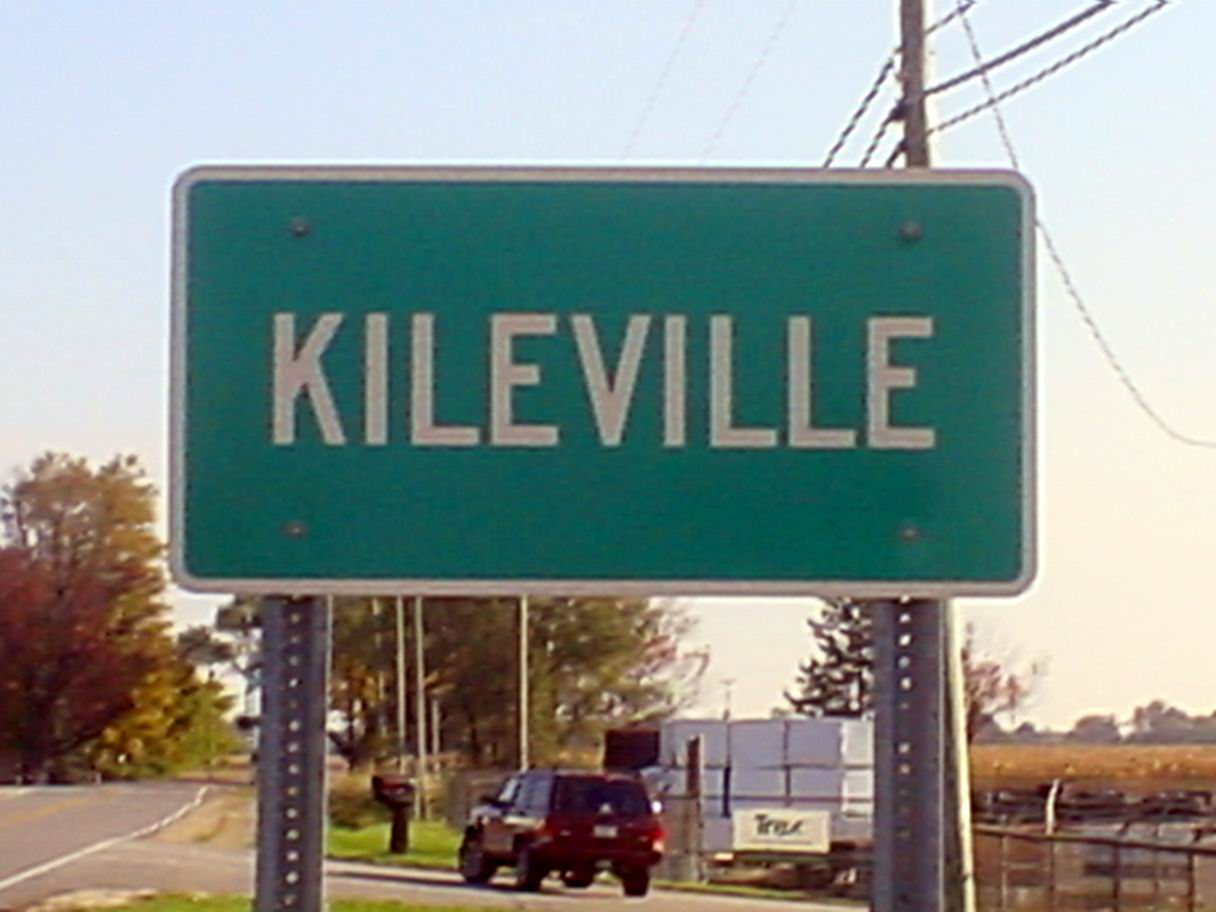
Kileville signage

Kileville was platted on October 2, 1895, by James Kile, a farmer who owned the land. It is located on the CSX railroad, but is only a small stop. As of 1915, Kileville was classified as a village, and consisted of one general store, one blacksmith, one post office, and one grain elevator.

Kileville was first electrified in 1920, when a power line was extended from Plain City. As of 1921, the Kileville Lighting Company had a total of nine customers.
