= Union Township, Madison County, Ohio =

Township in Ohio, US

- Township
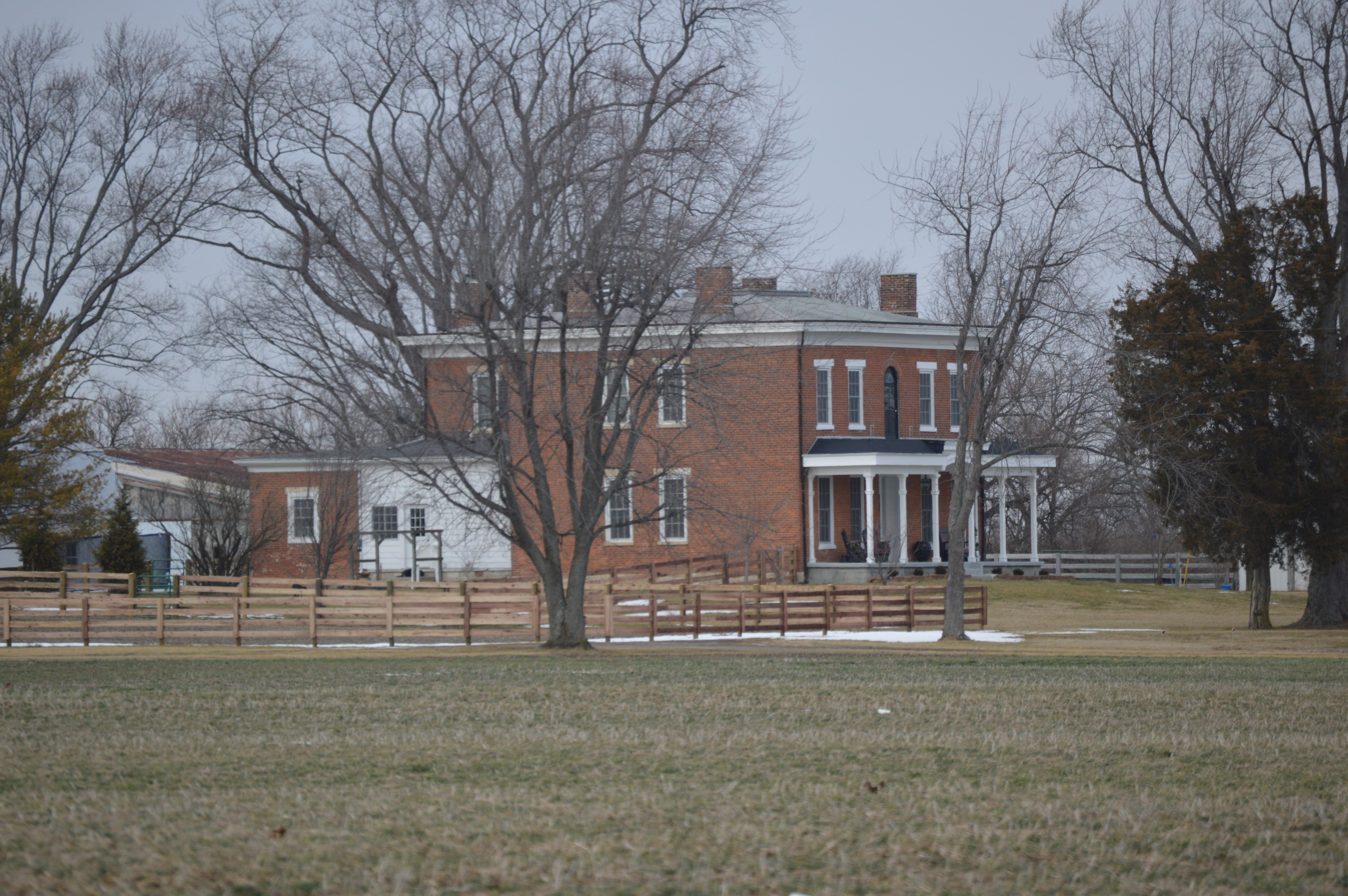
- Farmstead on State Route 38 south of London

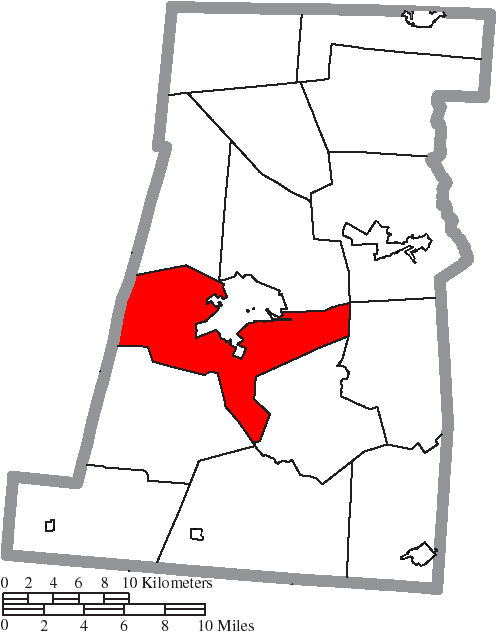
- Location of Union Township in Madison County
- Coordinates: 39°52′36″N 83°26′18″W
- Country: United States
- State: Ohio
- County: Madison

Area
  - Total: 39.0 sq mi (101.0 km^{2})
  - Land: 38.8 sq mi (100.4 km^{2})
  - Water: 0.23 sq mi (0.6 km^{2})
- Elevation: 1,056 ft (322 m)

Population (2020)
  - Total: 5,867
  - Density: 151.3/sq mi (58.44/km^{2})
- Time zone: UTC-5 (Eastern (EST))
  - Summer (DST): UTC-4 (EDT)
- FIPS code: 39-78428
- GNIS feature ID: 1086554

Union Township is one of the fourteen townships of Madison County, Ohio, United States. The 2020 census found 5,867 people in the township.

== Geography ==
Located in the western part of the county, it borders the following townships:

- Deer Creek Township - north
- Jefferson Township - northeast corner
- Fairfield Township - east
- Oak Run Township - southeast
- Paint Township - southwest
- Harmony Township, Clark County - west
- Somerford Township - northwest

Most of the city of London, the county seat of Madison County, is located in northern Union Township.

the Deer Creek flows through the township in its far east. Madison Lake State Park, a reservoir formed by the Madison Lake Dam is located in Union Township's portion of the Deer Creek.

The Oak Run flows within the township after running through the City of London. It continues southeast until it flows into Oak Run Township.

Along the Harmony Township border in the west, the Madison County high point is located within the township, at 1205 feet (367.3 meters).

== Name and history ==
It is one of twenty-seven Union Townships statewide.

== Government ==
The township is governed by a three-member board of trustees, who are elected in November of odd-numbered years to a four-year term beginning on the following January 1. Two are elected in the year after the presidential election and one is elected in the year before it. There is also an elected township fiscal officer, who serves a four-year term beginning on April 1 of the year after the election, which is held in November of the year before the presidential election. Vacancies in the fiscal officership or on the board of trustees are filled by the remaining trustees.
