= Midway, Ohio =

- Village
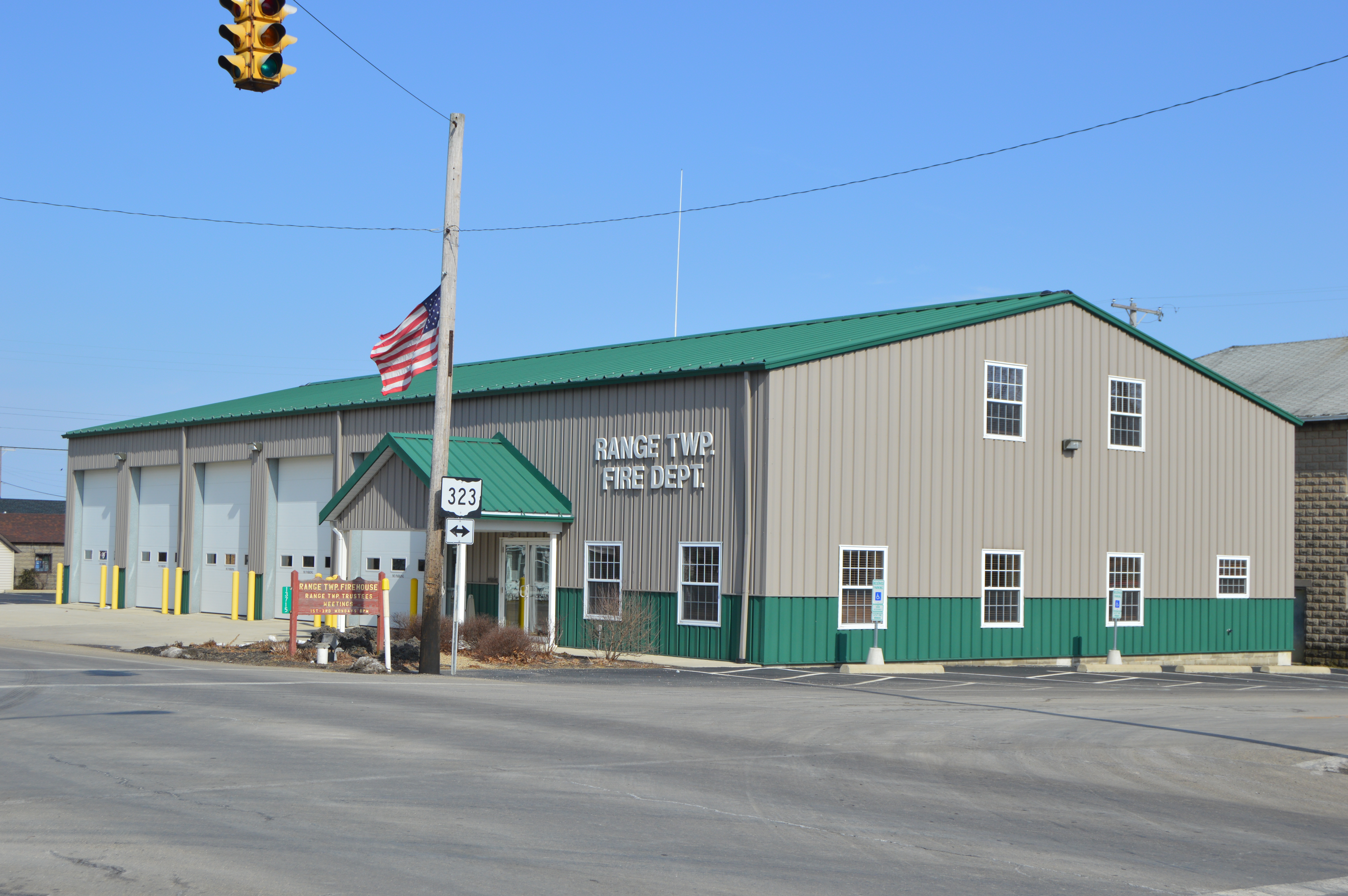
- Fire department downtown

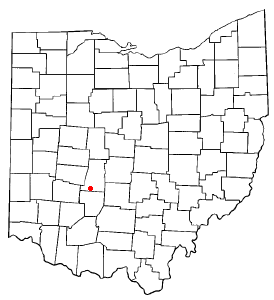
- Location of Midway, Ohio

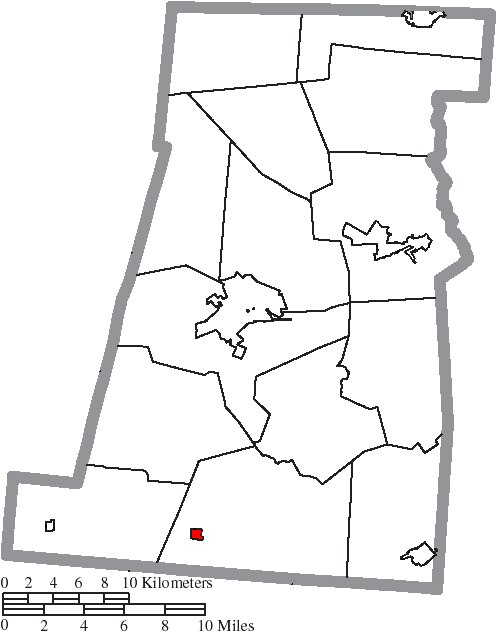
- Location of Midway in Madison County
- Coordinates: 39°43′59″N 83°28′36″W
- Country: United States
- State: Ohio
- County: Madison
- Township: Range

Area
  - Total: 0.26 sq mi (0.67 km^{2})
  - Land: 0.26 sq mi (0.67 km^{2})
  - Water: 0 sq mi (0.00 km^{2})
- Elevation: 1,070 ft (330 m)

Population (2020)
  - Total: 266
  - Density: 1,035.5/sq mi (399.81/km^{2})
- Time zone: UTC-5 (Eastern (EST))
  - Summer (DST): UTC-4 (EDT)
- ZIP Code: 43151
- FIPS code: 39-50008
- GNIS feature ID: 2399339

Midway (also called Sedalia) is a village in Range Township, Madison County, Ohio, United States. The population was 269 at the 2020 census.

Midway is also called "Sedalia" by some sources. Addresses with its ZIP code, 43151, are officially located in Sedalia.

== History ==
Midway was laid out by F. Thompson and William Morris, and recorded June 13, 1830. The community was named Midway for its location at the half-way point on a cattle route between Chicago and Philadelphia. As of 1875, the community contained two churches, three dry goods stores, one hotel, one blacksmith shop, one wagon shop, one shoe shop, one physician, and the population was 250.

== Geography ==
Midway is located at the intersection of Ohio State Routes 38 and 323.

According to the United States Census Bureau, the village has a total area of 0.29 square miles (0.75 km^{2}), all land.

== Demographics ==
Historical population
Census	Pop.	Note	%±
1900	274		—
1910	483		76.3%
1920	301		−37.7%
1930	317		5.3%
1940	278		−12.3%
1950	276		−0.7%
1960	341		23.6%
1970	318		−6.7%
1980	339		6.6%
1990	289		−14.7%
2000	274		−5.2%
2010	322		17.5%
2020	269		−16.5%
U.S. Decennial Census

=== 2010 census ===
As of the census of 2010, there were 322 people, 116 households, and 89 families living in the village. The population density was 1,110.3 inhabitants per square mile (428.7/km^{2}). There were 127 housing units at an average density of 437.9 per square mile (169.1/km^{2}). The racial makeup of the village was 97.2% White, 0.9% African American, 0.6% Native American, and 1.2% from two or more races. Hispanic or Latino of any race were 3.1% of the population.

There were 116 households, of which 43.1% had children under the age of 18 living with them, 48.3% were married couples living together, 19.8% had a female householder with no husband present, 8.6% had a male householder with no wife present, and 23.3% were non-families. 16.4% of all households were made up of individuals, and 6.9% had someone living alone who was 65 years of age or older. The average household size was 2.78 and the average family size was 3.04.

The median age in the village was 34.7 years. 30.7% of residents were under the age of 18; 9.9% were between the ages of 18 and 24; 20.8% were from 25 to 44; 26.6% were from 45 to 64; and 11.8% were 65 years of age or older. The gender makeup of the village was 48.8% male and 51.2% female.

=== 2000 census ===
As of the census of 2000, there were 274 people, 110 households, and 85 families living in the village. The population density was 984.9 inhabitants per square mile (380.3/km^{2}). There were 122 housing units at an average density of 438.5 per square mile (169.3/km^{2}). The racial makeup of the village was 99.64% White, and 0.36% from two or more races. Hispanic or Latino of any race were 1.46% of the population.

There were 110 households, out of which 38.2% had children under the age of 18 living with them, 60.9% were married couples living together, 10.0% had a female householder with no husband present, and 22.7% were non-families. 22.7% of all households were made up of individuals, and 13.6% had someone living alone who was 65 years of age or older. The average household size was 2.49 and the average family size was 2.91.

In the village, the population was spread out, with 28.1% under the age of 18, 4.7% from 18 to 24, 24.8% from 25 to 44, 25.9% from 45 to 64, and 16.4% who were 65 years of age or older. The median age was 38 years. For every 100 females there were 91.6 males. For every 100 females age 18 and over, there were 93.1 males.

The median income for a household in the village was $39,464, and the median income for a family was $42,500. Males had a median income of $34,167 versus $25,714 for females. The per capita income for the village was $17,990. About 2.2% of families and 3.0% of the population were below the poverty line, including none of those under the age of eighteen and 10.9% of those 65 or over.

== Notable person ==
- William V. Allen, former Nebraska Senator
