= Ohio State Route 323 =

State highway in Madison County, Ohio, US

State Route 323

Route information
- Maintained by ODOT
- Length: 18.64 mi (30.00 km)
- Existed: 1932–present

Major junctions
- West end: SR 41 in South Solon
- East end: SR 56 near Mount Sterling

Location
- Country: United States
- State: Ohio
- Counties: Madison

Highway system
- Ohio State Highway System; Interstate; US; State; Scenic
← US 322	→ SR 324

State Route 323 (SR 323) is an east–west state highway in southwestern Ohio. SR 323's western terminus is at SR 41 in South Solon. Its eastern terminus is at SR 56 just northwest of Mount Sterling.

== Route description ==
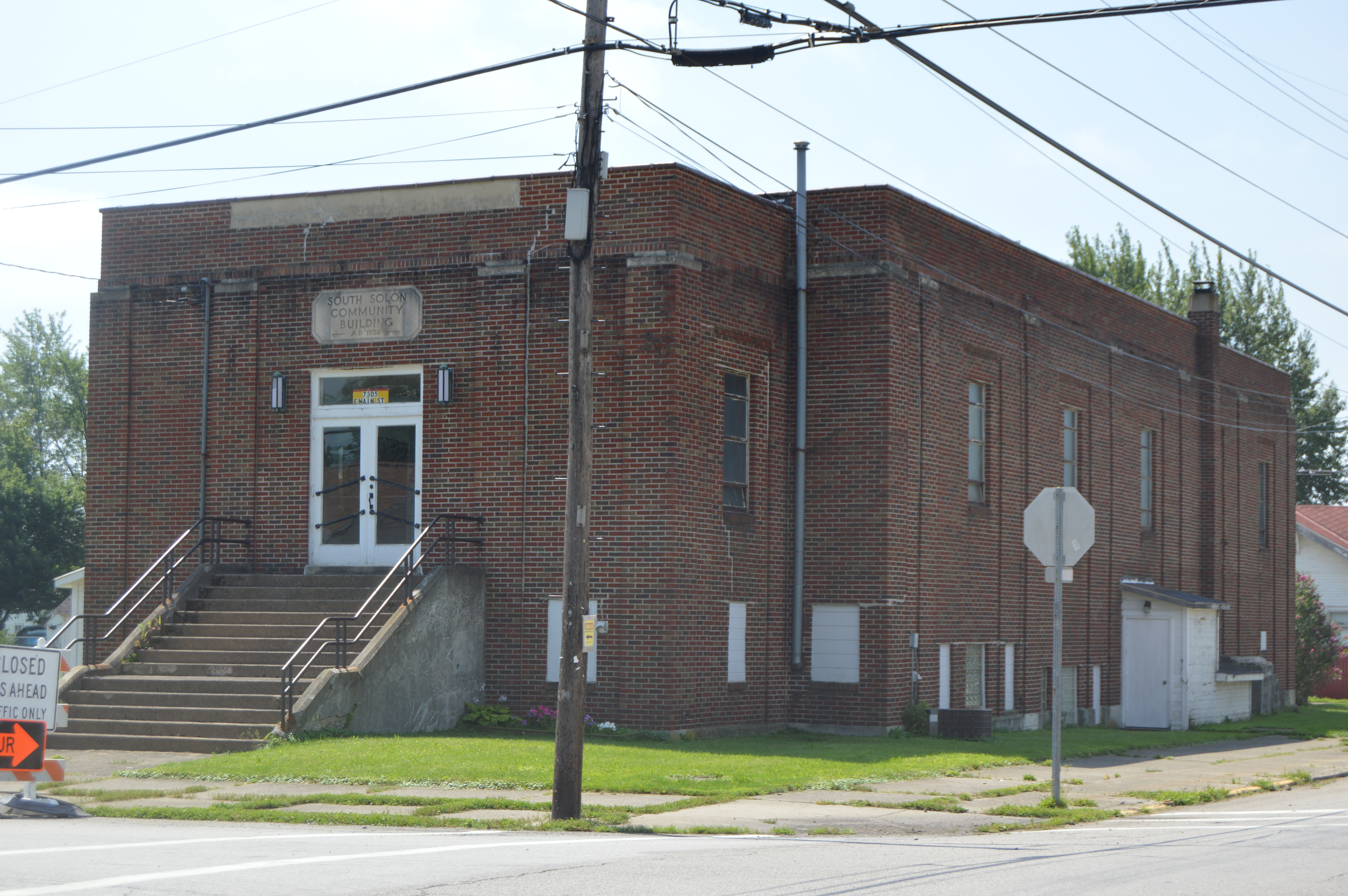
At the western terminus in South Solon

SR 323 runs exclusively within the southern portion of Madison County. No portion of SR 323 is included within the National Highway System.

== Major intersections ==
The entire route is in Madison County.

Location	mi	km	Destinations	Notes
South Solon	0.00	0.00	SR 41 (Washington Street) / Main Street	
Stokes Township	3.65	5.87	SR 729 south – Jeffersonville	Northern terminus of SR 729
Midway	7.60	12.23	SR 38 (Main Street)	
Pleasant Township	18.64	30.00	SR 56	
1.000 mi = 1.609 km; 1.000 km = 0.621 mi
