= Derby, Ohio =

- CDP
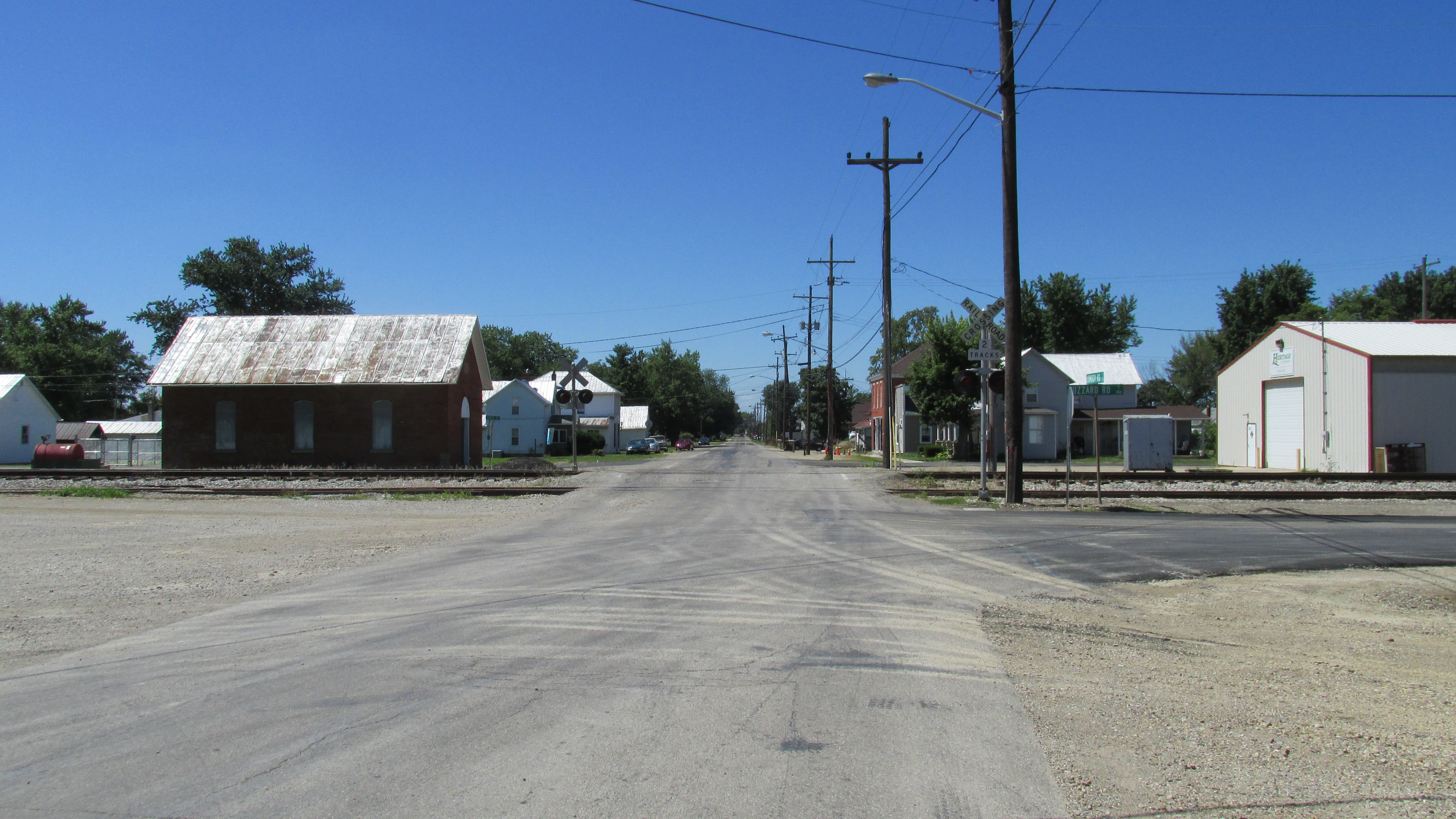
- Looking northwest on London Road in Derby, Ohio

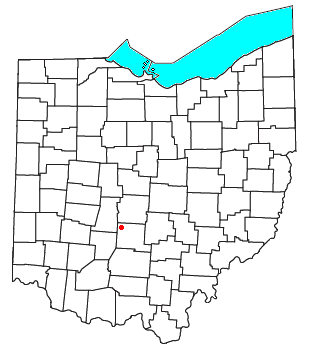
- Location of Derby, Ohio
- Country: United States
- State: Ohio
- County: Pickaway
- Township: Darby
- Elevation: 909 ft (277 m)

Population (2020)
  - Total: 355
- Time zone: UTC-5 (Eastern (EST))
  - Summer (DST): UTC-4 (EDT)
- ZIP: 43117
- GNIS feature ID: 2628883

Derby is a census-designated place in central Darby Township, Pickaway County, Ohio, United States. It is assigned the ZIP code 43117. The population was 355 at the 2020 census.

== History ==
Derby had its start when the railroad was extended to that point. A post office was established at Derby in 1881.
