= Jefferson Township, Madison County, Ohio =

Township in Ohio, US

- Township
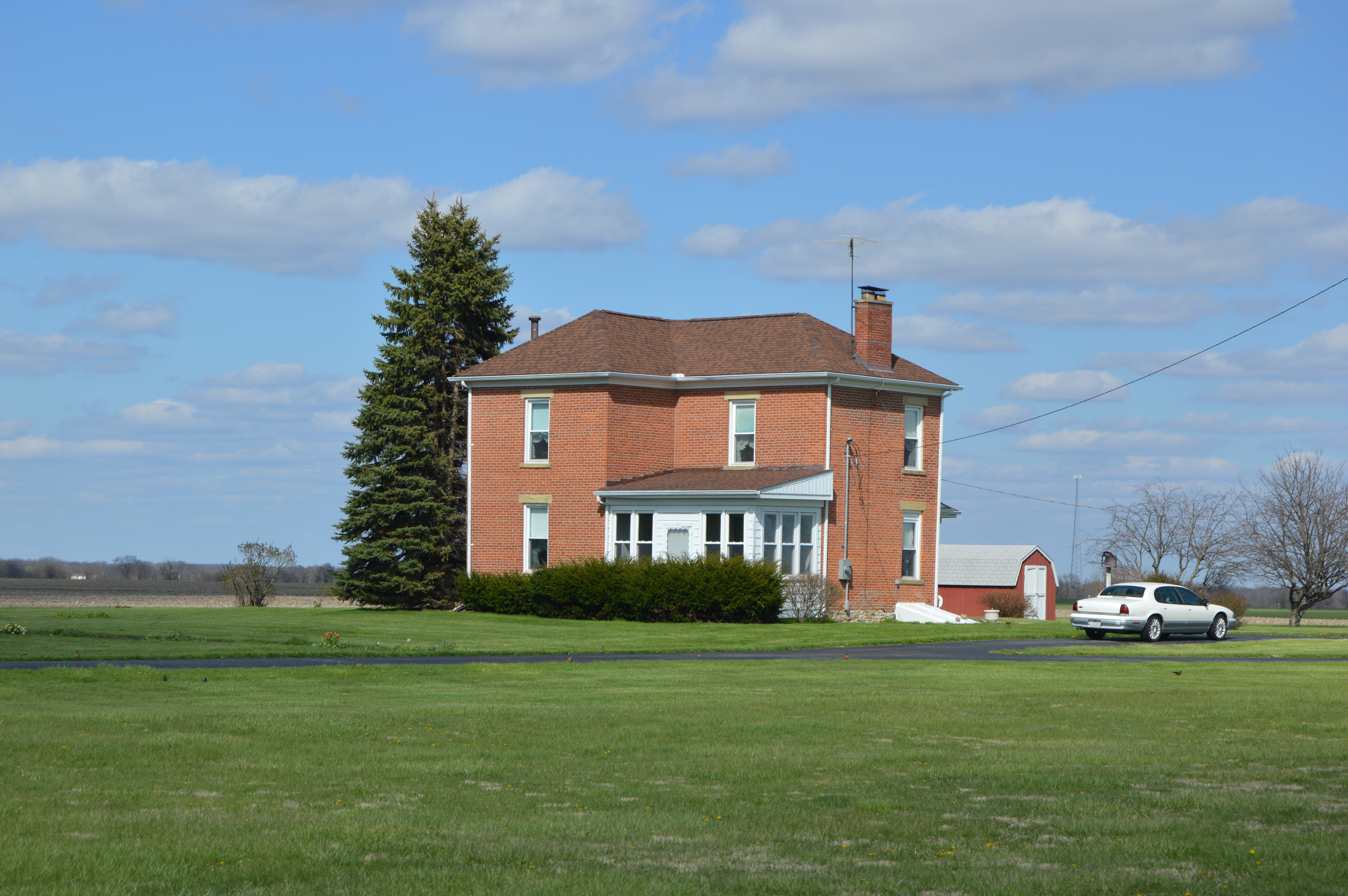
- House and farm fields south of West Jefferson

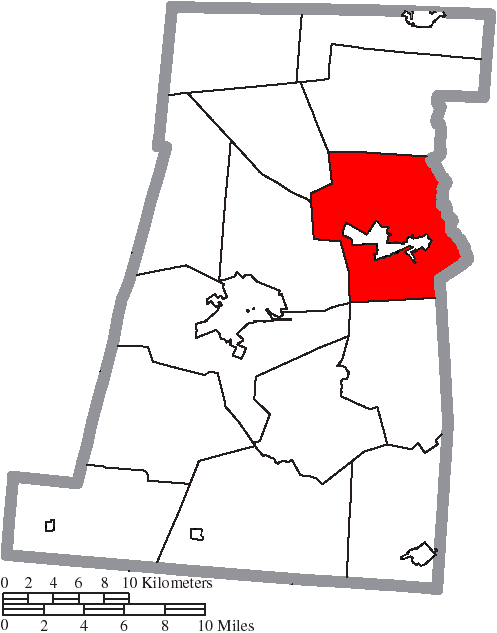
- Location of Jefferson Township in Madison County
- Coordinates: 39°56′50″N 83°16′51″W
- Country: United States
- State: Ohio
- County: Madison

Area
  - Total: 42.1 sq mi (109.1 km^{2})
  - Land: 42.1 sq mi (109.1 km^{2})
  - Water: 0.039 sq mi (0.1 km^{2})
- Elevation: 920 ft (280 m)

Population (2020)
  - Total: 7,212
  - Density: 171.2/sq mi (66.10/km^{2})
- Time zone: UTC-5 (Eastern (EST))
  - Summer (DST): UTC-4 (EDT)
- FIPS code: 39-38696
- GNIS feature ID: 1086544
- Website: https://jeffersontwpmadison.org/

Jefferson Township is one of the fourteen townships of Madison County, Ohio, United States. The 2020 census found 7,212 people in the township.

== Geography ==
Located in the eastern part of the county, it borders Franklin County, Ohio and the following townships:

- Canaan Township - north
- Brown Township, Franklin County - northeast
- Prairie Township, Franklin County - east
- Pleasant Township, Franklin County - northwest
- Fairfield Township - south
- Union Township - southwest corner
- Deer Creek Township - west
- Monroe Township - northwest

The village of West Jefferson is located in central Jefferson Township, along with the village of Gillivan, Ohio.

== Name and history ==
It is one of twenty-four Jefferson Townships statewide. The township's first settler, Michael Johnson, settled there in either 1796 or 1797.

== Government ==
The township is governed by a three-member board of trustees, who are elected in November of odd-numbered years to a four-year term beginning on the following January 1. Two are elected in the year after the presidential election and one is elected in the year before it. There is also an elected township fiscal officer, who serves a four-year term beginning on April 1 of the year after the election, which is held in November of the year before the presidential election. Vacancies in the fiscal officership or on the board of trustees are filled by the remaining trustees.
