= Madison County Courthouse (Ohio) =

Courthouse in Madison County, Ohio

- U.S. National Register of Historic Places
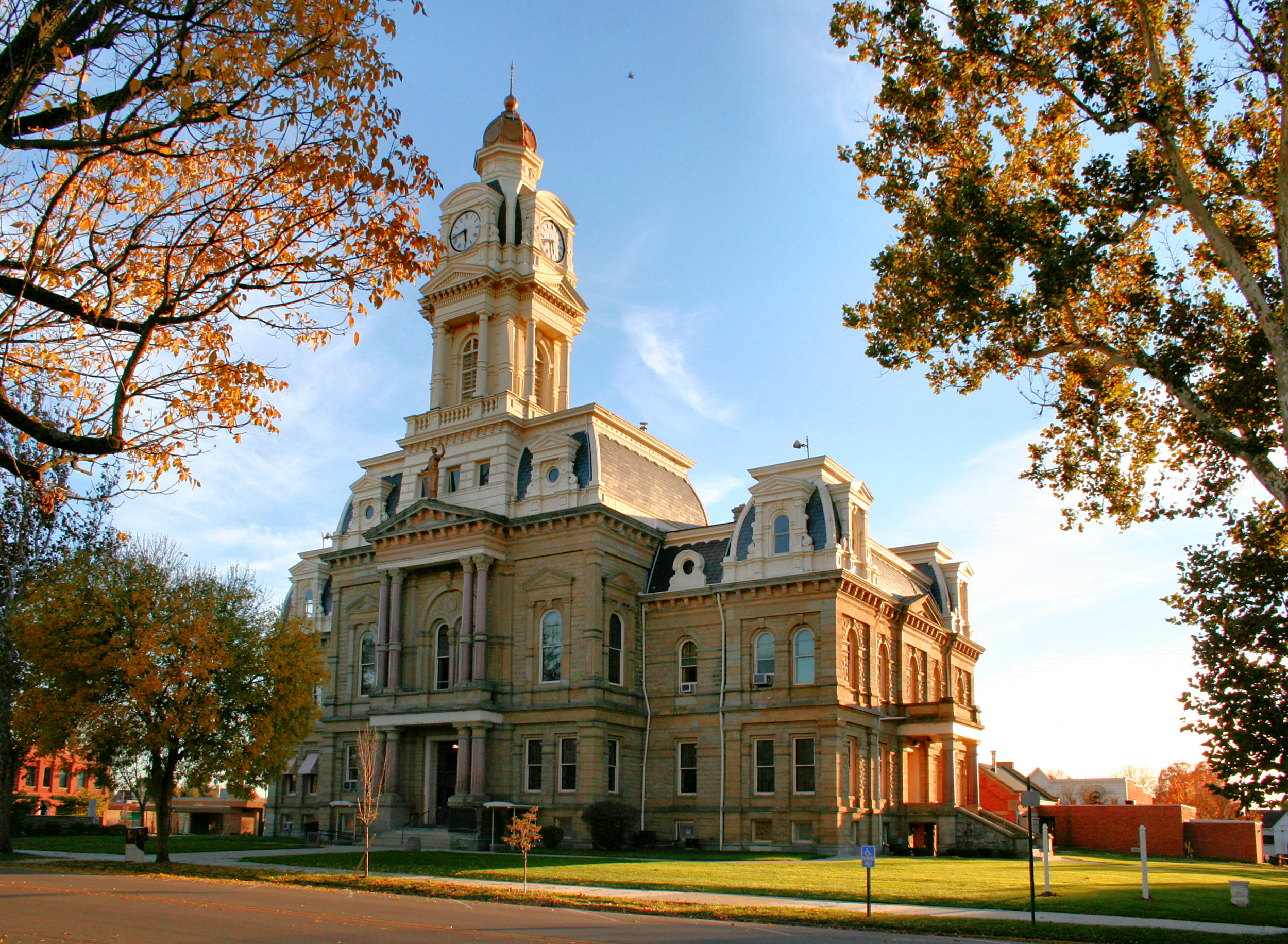
- Madison County Courthouse in 2005

- Location within Ohio Location within the United States
- Location: 1 N Main St, London, Ohio, U.S.
- Coordinates: 39.8865°N 83.4492°W
- Built: 1892
- Architect: George H. Maetzel
- Architectural style: Second Empire
- NRHP reference No.: 73001504
- Added to NRHP: March 14, 1973

The Madison County Courthouse is a historic Second Empire style courthouse located in London, Ohio. Constructed in 1892, it was listed in the National Register of Historic Places on March 14, 1973.

The courthouse was designed by George H. Maetzel. During the 1974 Super Outbreak, the tornado that destroyed most of Xenia hit London, causing the Lady Justice statue at the top of the courthouse to fall over.
