= Pleasant Township, Franklin County, Ohio =

Township in Ohio, US

- Township
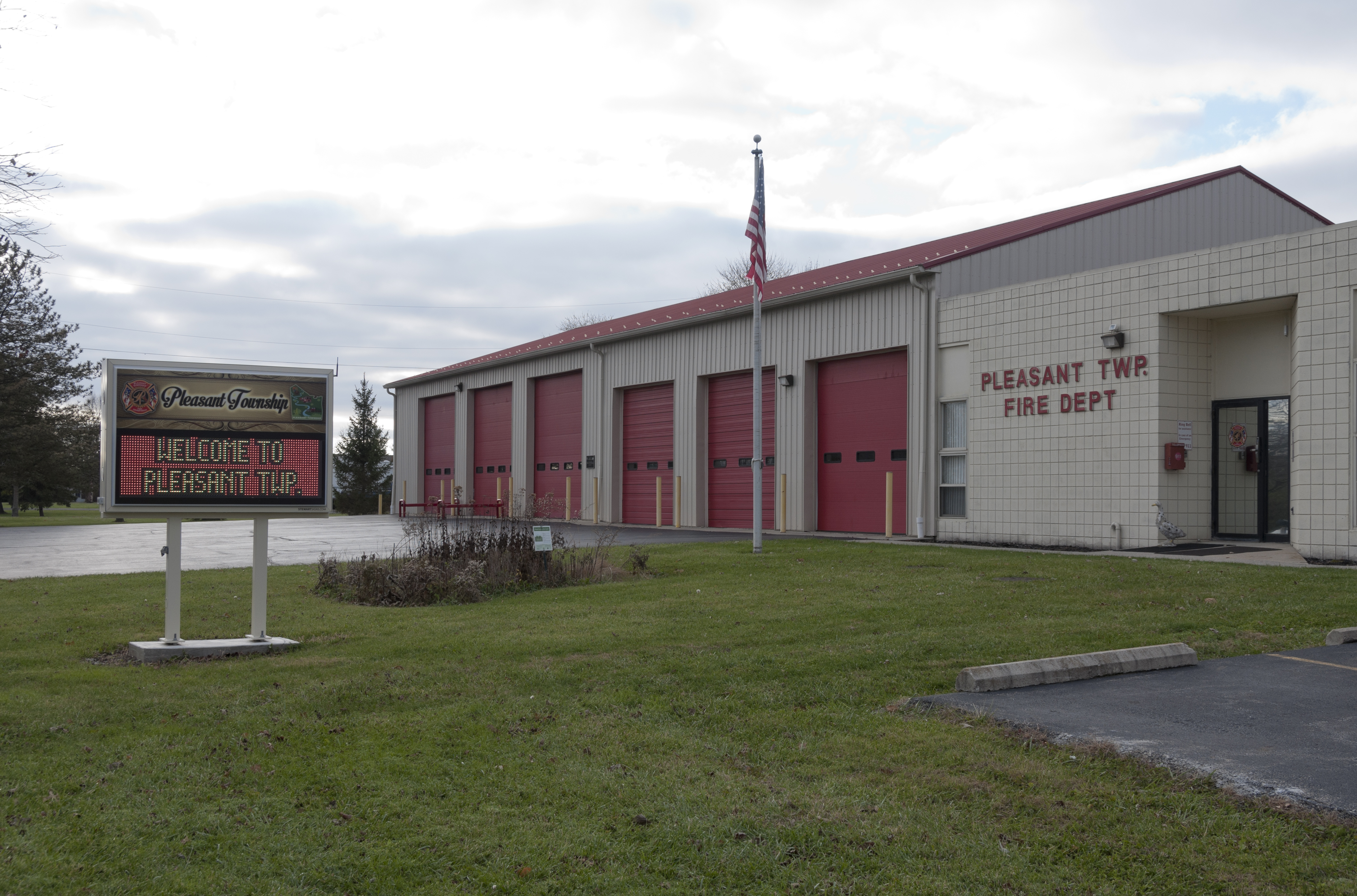
- Pleasant Township Municipal Building

- Location of Pleasant Township in Franklin County
- Coordinates: 39°50′46″N 83°10′48″W
- Country: United States
- State: Ohio
- County: Franklin

Area
  - Total: 43.6 sq mi (112.9 km^{2})
  - Land: 43.0 sq mi (111.3 km^{2})
  - Water: 0.62 sq mi (1.6 km^{2})
- Elevation: 909 ft (277 m)

Population (2020)
  - Total: 6,757
  - Density: 157.2/sq mi (60.71/km^{2})
- Time zone: UTC-5 (Eastern (EST))
  - Summer (DST): UTC-4 (EDT)
- FIPS code: 39-63254
- GNIS feature ID: 1086112
- Website: www.pleasanttownship.com

Pleasant Township is one of the seventeen townships of Franklin County, Ohio, United States. As of the 2020 census, the population was 6,757.

== Geography ==
Located in the southwestern corner of the county, it borders the following townships:

- Prairie Township - north
- Jackson Township - east
- Scioto Township, Pickaway County - southeast
- Darby Township, Pickaway County - south
- Fairfield Township, Madison County - west
- Jefferson Township, Madison County - northwest

Parts of two municipalities are located in Pleasant Township: the city of Columbus, the county seat of Franklin County, in the northeast; and the village of Harrisburg, in the south. The unincorporated communities of Darbydale and Georgesville lie in the township's south and west, respectively.

== Name and history ==
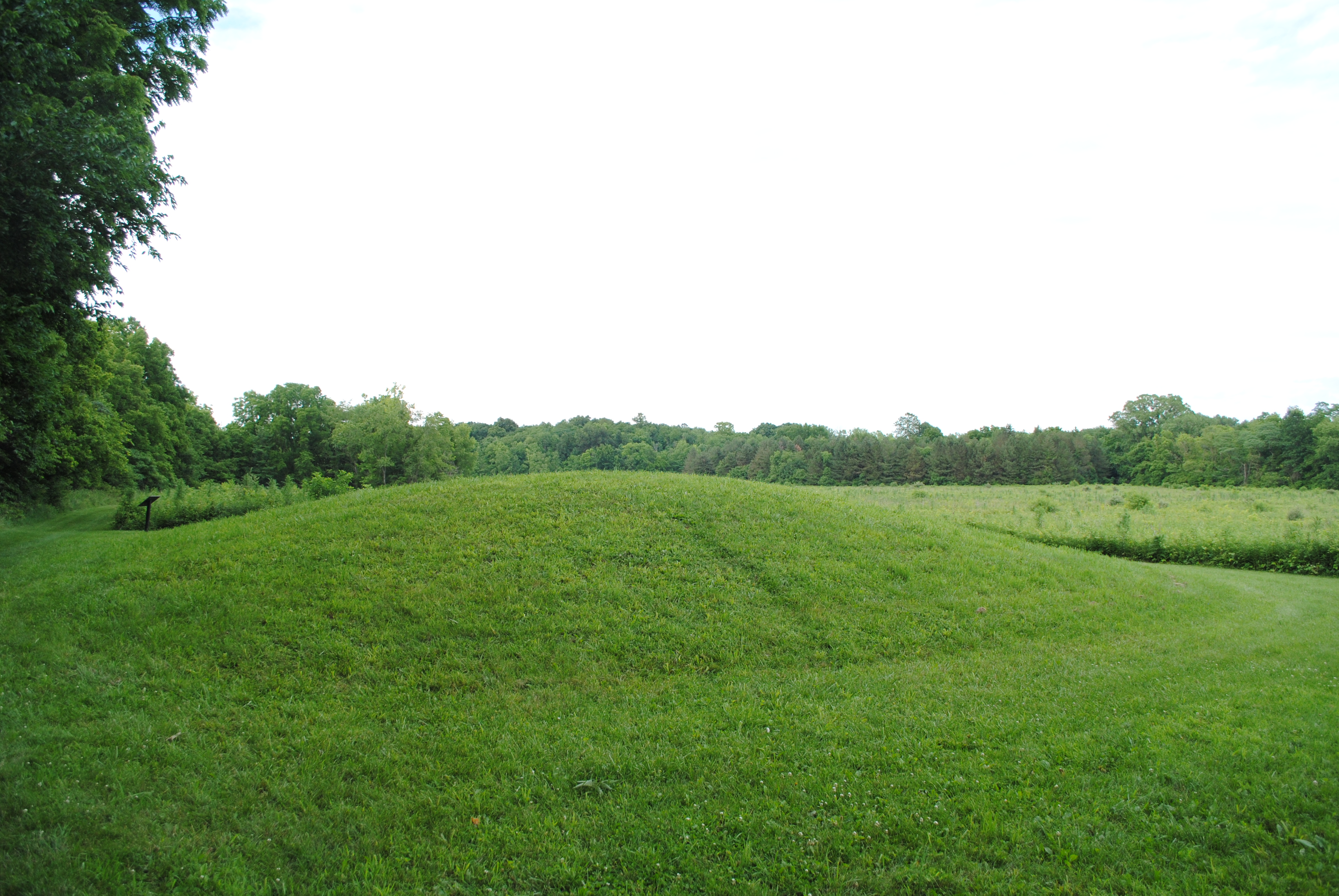
John Galbreath Mound

It is one of fifteen Pleasant Townships statewide.

In 1833, a gristmill and a saw mill operated on Little Darby Creek in the northern part of Pleasant Township.

== Government ==
The township is governed by a three-member board of trustees, who are elected in November of odd-numbered years to a four-year term beginning on the following January 1. Two are elected in the year after the presidential election and one is elected in the year before it. There is also an elected township fiscal officer, who serves a four-year term beginning on April 1 of the year after the election, which is held in November of the year before the presidential election. Vacancies in the fiscal officership or on the board of trustees are filled by the remaining trustees.
