= Oak Run Township, Madison County, Ohio =

Township in Ohio, US

- Township
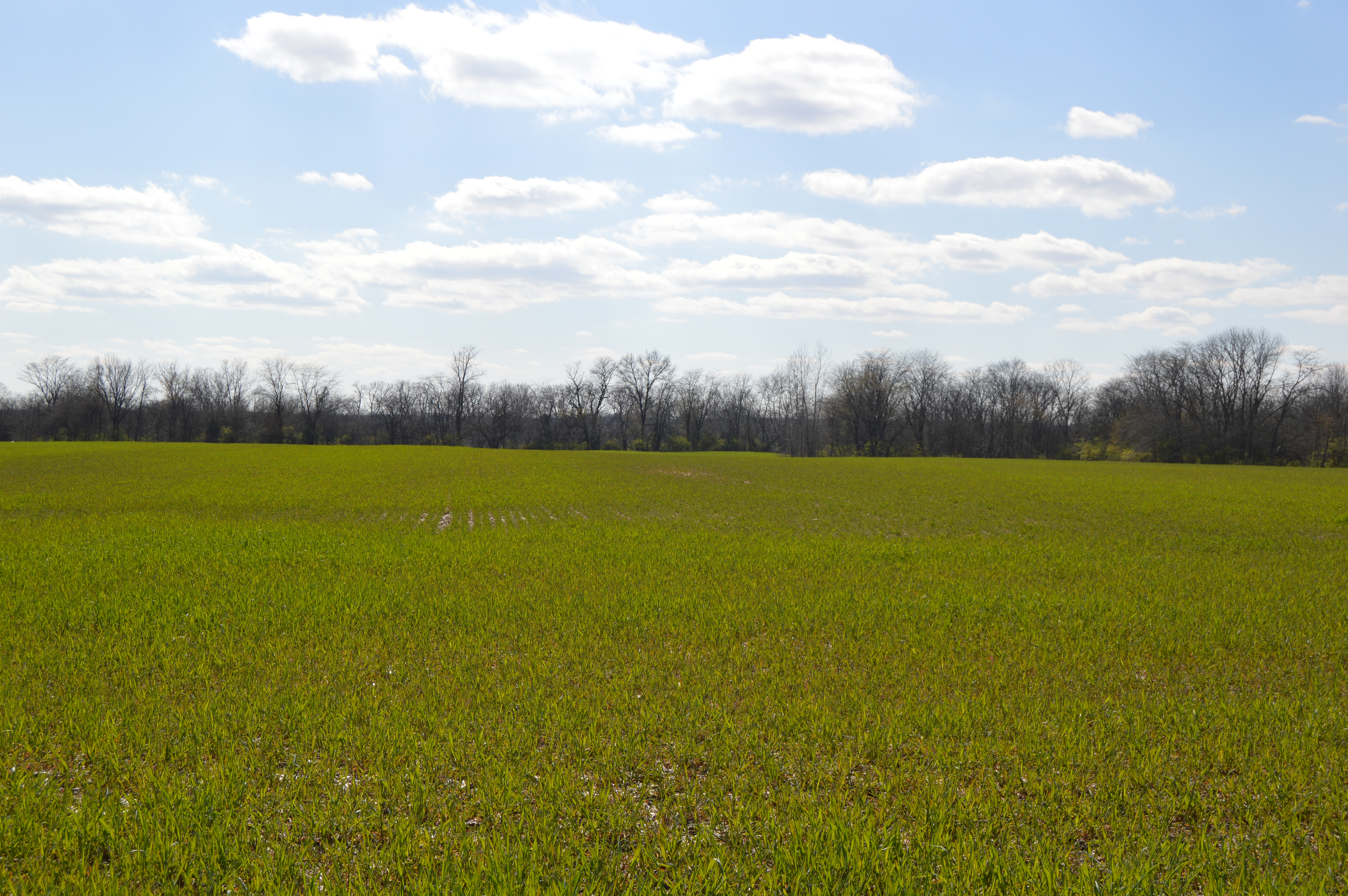
- Fields in the township's east

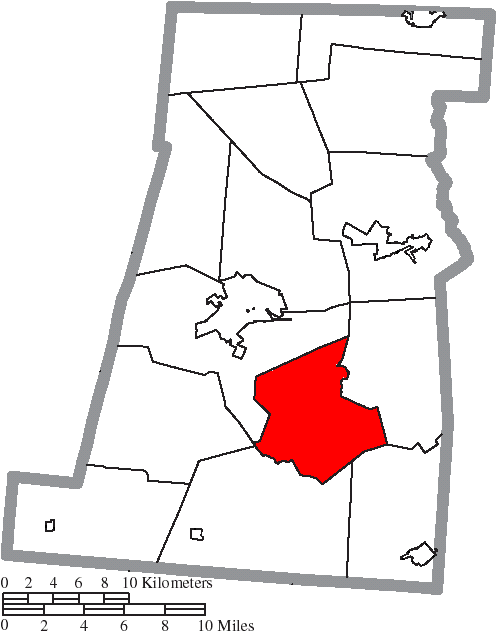
- Location of Oak Run Township in Madison County
- Coordinates: 39°49′19″N 83°22′20″W
- Country: United States
- State: Ohio
- County: Madison

Area
  - Total: 28.0 sq mi (72.5 km^{2})
  - Land: 28.0 sq mi (72.4 km^{2})
  - Water: 0 sq mi (0.0 km^{2})
- Elevation: 991 ft (302 m)

Population (2020)
  - Total: 521
  - Density: 18.6/sq mi (7.20/km^{2})
- Time zone: UTC-5 (Eastern (EST))
  - Summer (DST): UTC-4 (EDT)
- FIPS code: 39-57708
- GNIS feature ID: 1086547

Oak Run Township is one of the fourteen townships of Madison County, Ohio, United States. The 2020 census found 521 people in the township.

== Geography ==
Located in the southern part of the county, it borders the following townships:

- Fairfield Township - east
- Pleasant Township - southeast
- Range Township - south
- Paint Township - west
- Union Township - northwest

No municipalities are located in Oak Run Township.

== Name and history ==
It is the only Oak Run Township statewide.

== Government ==
The township is governed by a three-member board of trustees, who are elected in November of odd-numbered years to a four-year term beginning on the following January 1. Two are elected in the year after the presidential election and one is elected in the year before it. There is also an elected township fiscal officer, who serves a four-year term beginning on April 1 of the year after the election, which is held in November of the year before the presidential election. Vacancies in the fiscal officership or on the board of trustees are filled by the remaining trustees.
