= Paint Township, Madison County, Ohio =

Township in Ohio, US

- Township
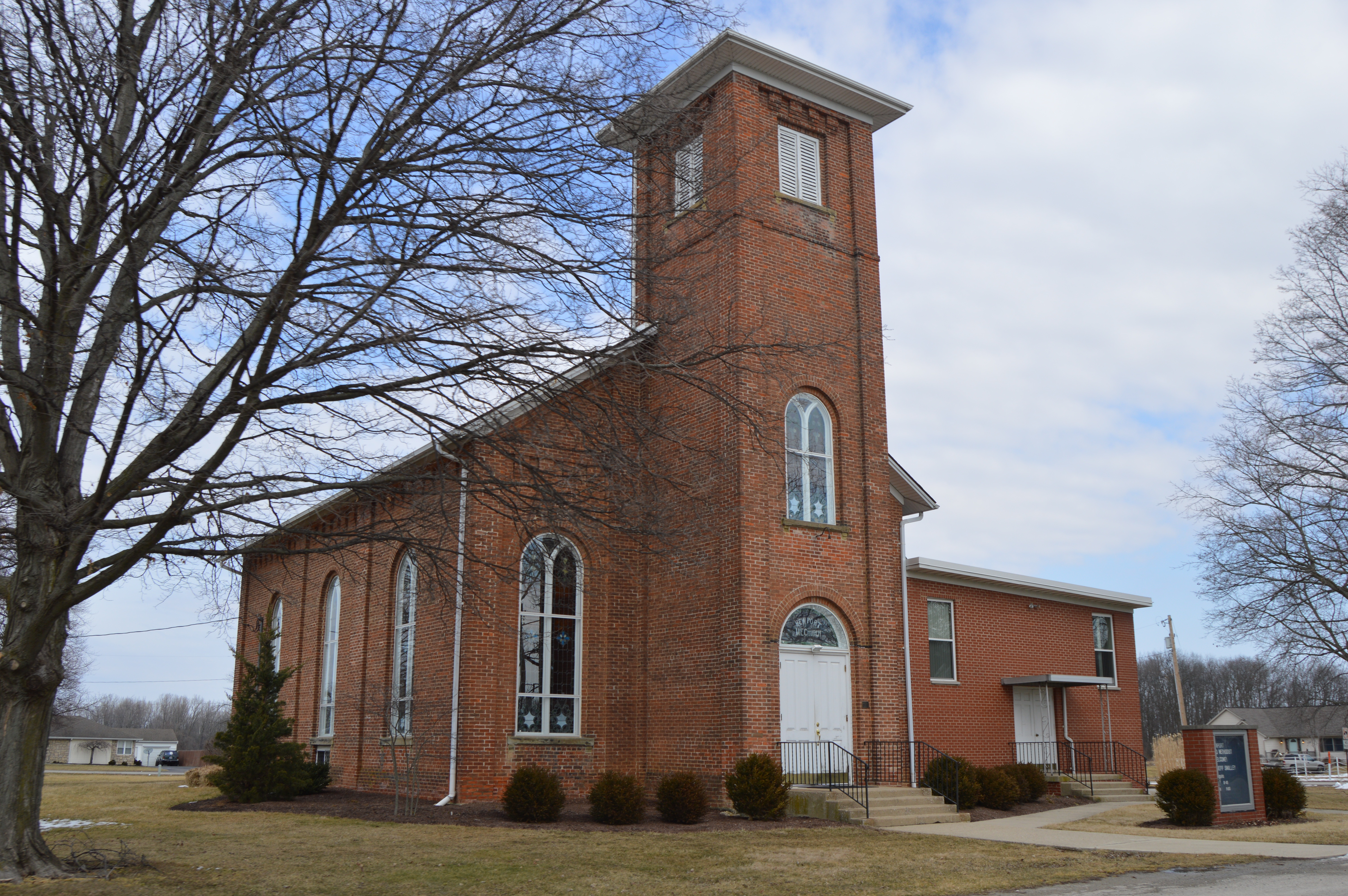
- Methodist church in Newport

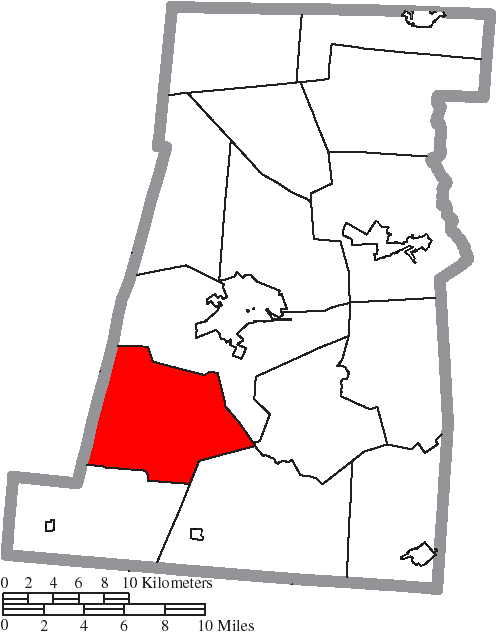
- Location of Paint Township in Madison County
- Coordinates: 39°49′56″N 83°31′31″W
- Country: United States
- State: Ohio
- County: Madison

Area
  - Total: 36.7 sq mi (95.0 km^{2})
  - Land: 36.7 sq mi (95.0 km^{2})
  - Water: 0 sq mi (0.0 km^{2})
- Elevation: 1,096 ft (334 m)

Population (2020)
  - Total: 554
  - Density: 15.1/sq mi (5.83/km^{2})
- Time zone: UTC-5 (Eastern (EST))
  - Summer (DST): UTC-4 (EDT)
- FIPS code: 39-59528
- GNIS feature ID: 1086548

Paint Township is one of the fourteen townships of Madison County, Ohio, United States. The 2020 census found 554 people in the township.

== Geography ==
Located in the southwestern part of the county, it borders the following townships:

- Union Township - northeast
- Oak Run Township - east
- Range Township - southeast
- Stokes Township - southwest
- Madison Township, Clark County - west
- Harmony Township, Clark County - northwest

No municipalities are located in Paint Township.

== Name and history ==
Paint Township takes its name from Paint Creek. It is one of six Paint Townships statewide.

== Government ==
The township is governed by a three-member board of trustees, who are elected in November of odd-numbered years to a four-year term beginning on the following January 1. Two are elected in the year after the presidential election and one is elected in the year before it. There is also an elected township fiscal officer, who serves a four-year term beginning on April 1 of the year after the election, which is held in November of the year before the presidential election. Vacancies in the fiscal officership or on the board of trustees are filled by the remaining trustees.
