= Resaca, Ohio =

- Unincorporated community
- Location within Ohio Location within the United States
- Coordinates: 40°02′58″N 83°23′17″W
- Country: United States
- State: Ohio
- Counties: Madison
- Township: Monroe
- Elevation: 981 ft (299 m)
- Time zone: UTC-5 (Eastern (EST))
  - Summer (DST): UTC-4 (EDT)
- ZIP Codes: 43064 (Plain City); 43140 (London)
- Area code: 740
- GNIS feature ID: 1070912

Resaca is an unincorporated community in Monroe Township, Madison County, Ohio, United States. It is located at the intersection of Finley Guy Road and Woods and W Avenue.

Resaca was never platted, but the Resaca Post Office was established on March 16, 1887. In 1915, the community had two general stores, one blacksmith, one physician, a poolroom and a population of 30. The post office was discontinued on December 15, 1905. The mail service is now sent through the Plain City branch.
