= Range Township, Madison County, Ohio =

Township in Ohio, US

- Township
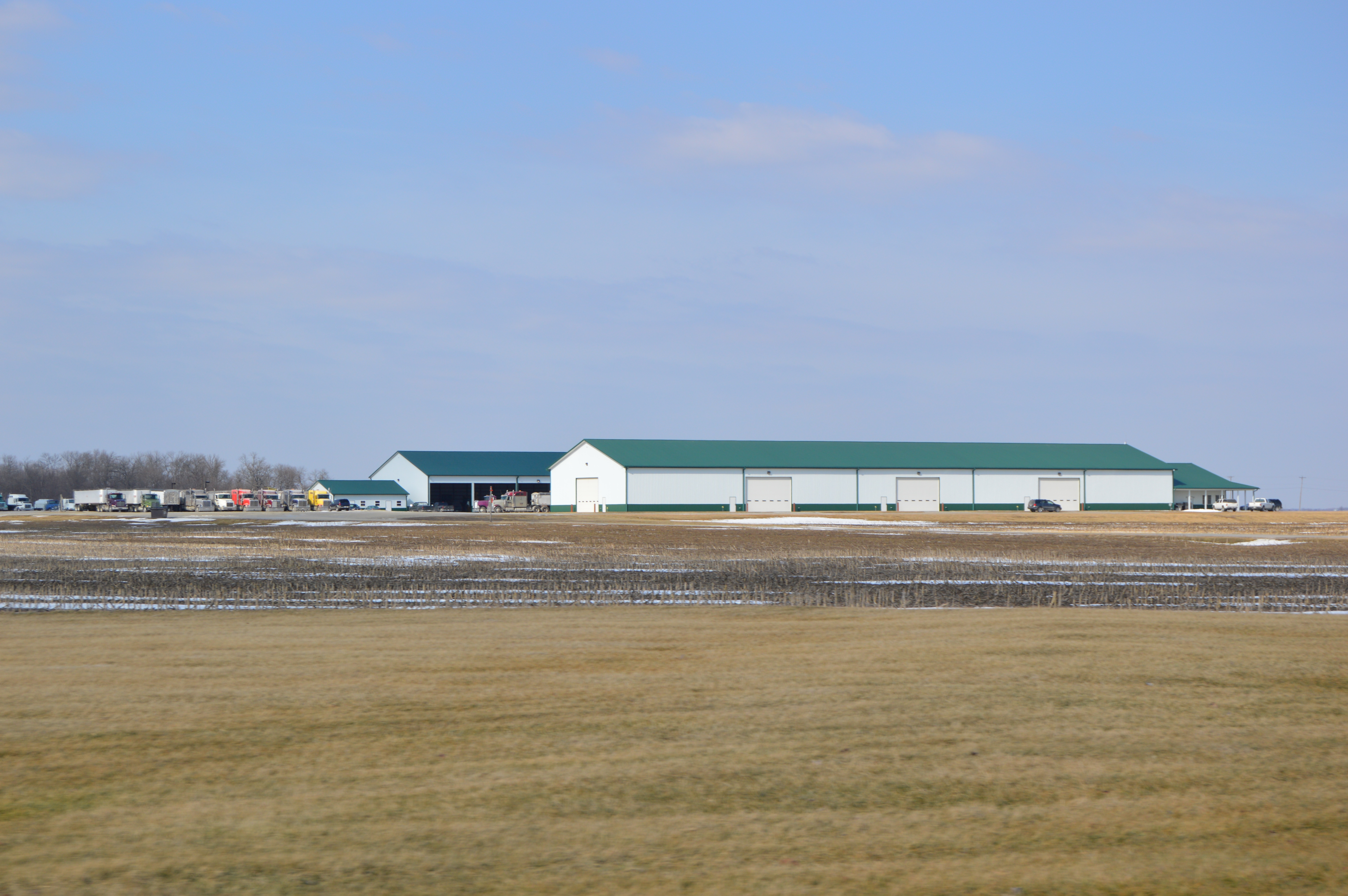
- Farm southwest of Midway

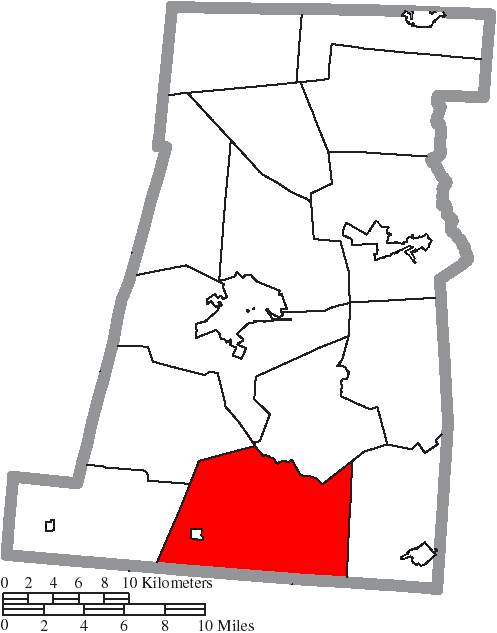
- Location of Range Township in Madison County
- Coordinates: 39°44′28″N 83°25′39″W
- Country: United States
- State: Ohio
- County: Madison

Area
  - Total: 48.2 sq mi (124.8 km^{2})
  - Land: 48.2 sq mi (124.8 km^{2})
  - Water: 0 sq mi (0.0 km^{2})
- Elevation: 1,014 ft (309 m)

Population (2020)
  - Total: 981
  - Density: 20.4/sq mi (7.86/km^{2})
- Time zone: UTC-5 (Eastern (EST))
  - Summer (DST): UTC-4 (EDT)
- FIPS code: 39-65480
- GNIS feature ID: 1086551

Range Township is one of the fourteen townships of Madison County, Ohio, United States. The 2020 census found 981 people in the township

== Geography ==
Located in the southern part of the county, it borders the following townships:

- Oak Run Township - north
- Pleasant Township - east
- Madison Township, Fayette County - southeast
- Paint Township, Fayette County - south
- Stokes Township - west
- Paint Township - northwest

The village of Midway is located in southwestern Range Township.

== Name and history ==
As of 1854, the population of the township was 988. It is the only Range Township statewide.

== Government ==
The township is governed by a three-member board of trustees, who are elected in November of odd-numbered years to a four-year term beginning on the following January 1. Two are elected in the year after the presidential election and one is elected in the year before it. There is also an elected township fiscal officer, who serves a four-year term beginning on April 1 of the year after the election, which is held in November of the year before the presidential election. Vacancies in the fiscal officership or on the board of trustees are filled by the remaining trustees.
