= Ohio State Route 38 =

State highway in Ohio

State Route 38

Route information
- Maintained by ODOT
- Length: 48.67 mi (78.33 km)
- Existed: 1924–present

Major junctions
- South end: US 62 / SR 3 near Bloomingburg
- I-71 near South Solon; US 42 / SR 56 / SR 142 / SR 665 in London; US 40 near London
- North end: SR 31 in Marysville

Location
- Country: United States
- State: Ohio
- Counties: Fayette, Madison, Union

Highway system
- Ohio State Highway System; Interstate; US; State; Scenic
← SR 37	→ SR 39

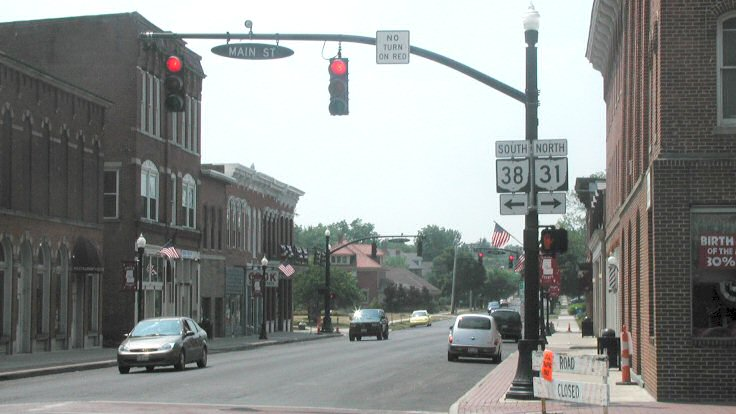
Northern terminus in Marysville

State Route 38 (SR 38) is a south–north state highway in the state of Ohio. Its southern terminus is near Bloomingburg and Washington Court House at the U.S. Route 62 / SR 3 concurrency and its northern terminus is in Marysville at the intersection of 5th Street and Main Street where the road continues north as SR 31.

On its winding route through central Ohio, State Route 38 mainly offers views of rolling or flat farmland planted with corn, soybeans, and other crops. It also passes through a variety of towns including Bloomingburg, London, and Marysville.

== History ==
When it was designated in 1923 along existing state highways, SR 38 traveled from Ripley on the Ohio River to Marion. This route included its current segment between Washington Court House and Marysville, but also served Russellville and Hillsboro. In 1927, the segment of SR 38 north of Marysville was deleted and renumbered by a relocated SR 4. The route would reach its long-time routing between Washington Court House and Marysville in 1932 when US 62 was brought into Ohio replacing SR 38 between Ripley and Washington Court House.

Between 2014 and 2015, State Route 38 was realigned south of Bloomingburg to replace State Route 238. The old route of SR 38 between Bloomingburg and Washington Court House was turned over to Fayette County.

== Major junctions ==
County	Location	mi	km	Destinations	Notes
Fayette	Union Township	0.00	0.00	US 62 / SR 3 / Old Springfield Road – Washington Court House, Columbus	
Fayette	Paint Township	4.69	7.55	SR 734 west – Jeffersonville	Eastern terminus of SR 734
Fayette	Paint Township	8.16– 8.36	13.13– 13.45	I-71 – Columbus, Cincinnati	Exit 75 (I-71)
Madison	Midway	11.10	17.86	SR 323 (Federal Street)	
Madison	London	22.10	35.57	SR 56 east (East Main Street) / SR 665 east (East Center Street)	Southern end of SR 56 / SR 665 concurrency
Madison	London	22.42	36.08	US 42 south / SR 142 begins (West High Street) / SR 56 west (West Main Street) / SR 665 ends	Southern end of US 42 / SR 142 concurrency; northern end of SR 56 / SR 665 concurrency
Madison	London	22.62	36.40	SR 142 east (East High Street)	Northern end of SR 142 concurrency
Madison	London	22.83	36.74	US 42 north (Lafayette Road)	Northern end of US 42 concurrency
Madison	Deer Creek Township	25.98	41.81	US 40 (National Pike)	
Madison	Deer Creek–Monroe township line	30.52	49.12	SR 29 – West Jefferson, Mechanicsburg	
Union	Union Township	38.99	62.75	SR 161 west – Urbana	Southern end of SR 161 concurrency
Union	Darby Township	39.18	63.05	SR 161 east – Plain City	Northern end of SR 161 concurrency
Union	Marysville	47.00	75.64	SR 736 south	Northern terminus of SR 736
Union	Marysville	48.67	78.33	SR 31 north (North Main Street) / 5th Street	Southern terminus of SR 31
1.000 mi = 1.609 km; 1.000 km = 0.621 mi: Concurrency terminus
