= Stokes Township, Madison County, Ohio =

Township in Ohio, US

- Township
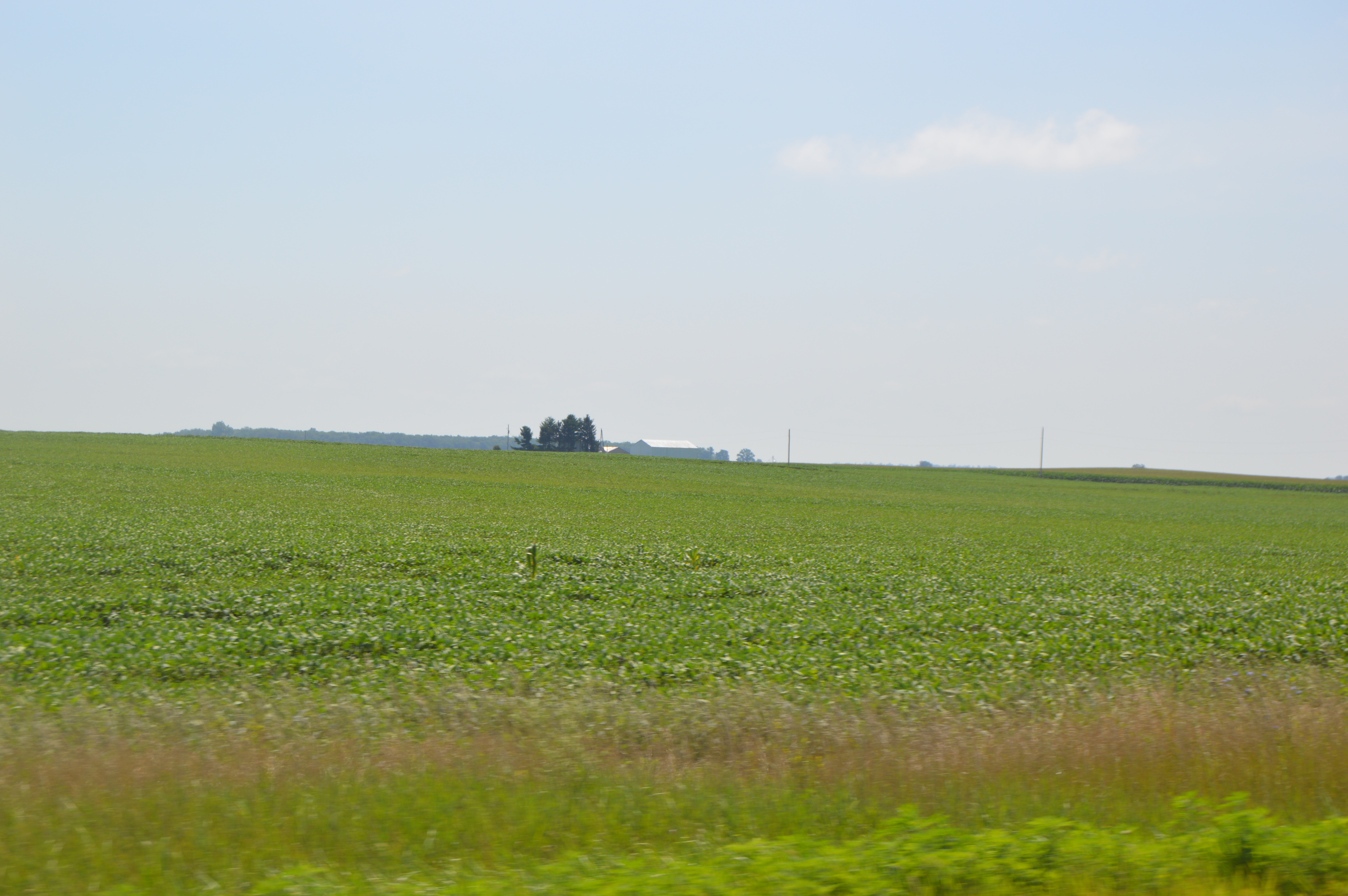
- Fields on State Route 41 north of South Solon

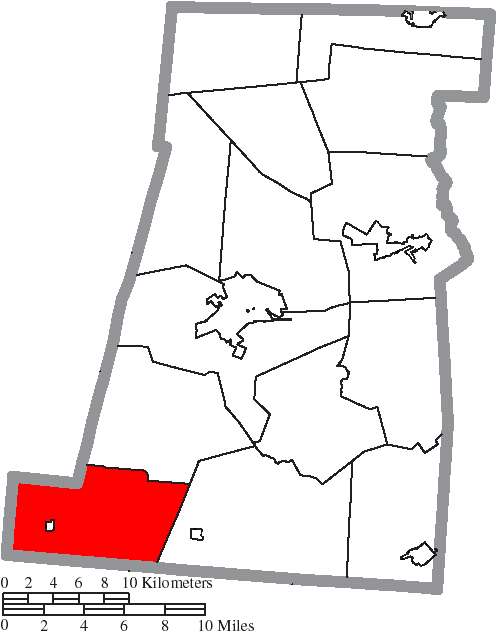
- Location of Stokes Township in Madison County
- Coordinates: 39°44′59″N 83°35′40″W
- Country: United States
- State: Ohio
- County: Madison

Area
  - Total: 34.8 sq mi (90.1 km^{2})
  - Land: 34.8 sq mi (90.1 km^{2})
  - Water: 0 sq mi (0.0 km^{2})
- Elevation: 1,109 ft (338 m)

Population (2020)
  - Total: 648
  - Density: 18.6/sq mi (7.19/km^{2})
- Time zone: UTC-5 (Eastern (EST))
  - Summer (DST): UTC-4 (EDT)
- FIPS code: 39-74784
- GNIS feature ID: 1086553

Stokes Township is one of the fourteen townships of Madison County, Ohio, United States. The 2020 census found 648 people in the township.

== Geography ==
Located in the southwestern corner of the county, it borders the following townships:

- Paint Township - northeast
- Range Township - east
- Paint Township, Fayette County - southeast
- Jefferson Township, Fayette County - south
- Ross Township, Greene County - west
- Madison Township, Clark County - northwest

The village of South Solon is located in western Stokes Township.

The most westerly township in the county, it is the only township to border Greene County.

== Name and history ==
Statewide, the only other Stokes Township is located in Logan County.

== Government ==
The township is governed by a three-member board of trustees, who are elected in November of odd-numbered years to a four-year term beginning on the following January 1. Two are elected in the year after the presidential election and one is elected in the year before it. There is also an elected township fiscal officer, who serves a four-year term beginning on April 1 of the year after the election, which is held in November of the year before the presidential election. Vacancies in the fiscal officership or on the board of trustees are filled by the remaining trustees.
