= Fairfield Township, Madison County, Ohio =

Township in Ohio, US

- Township
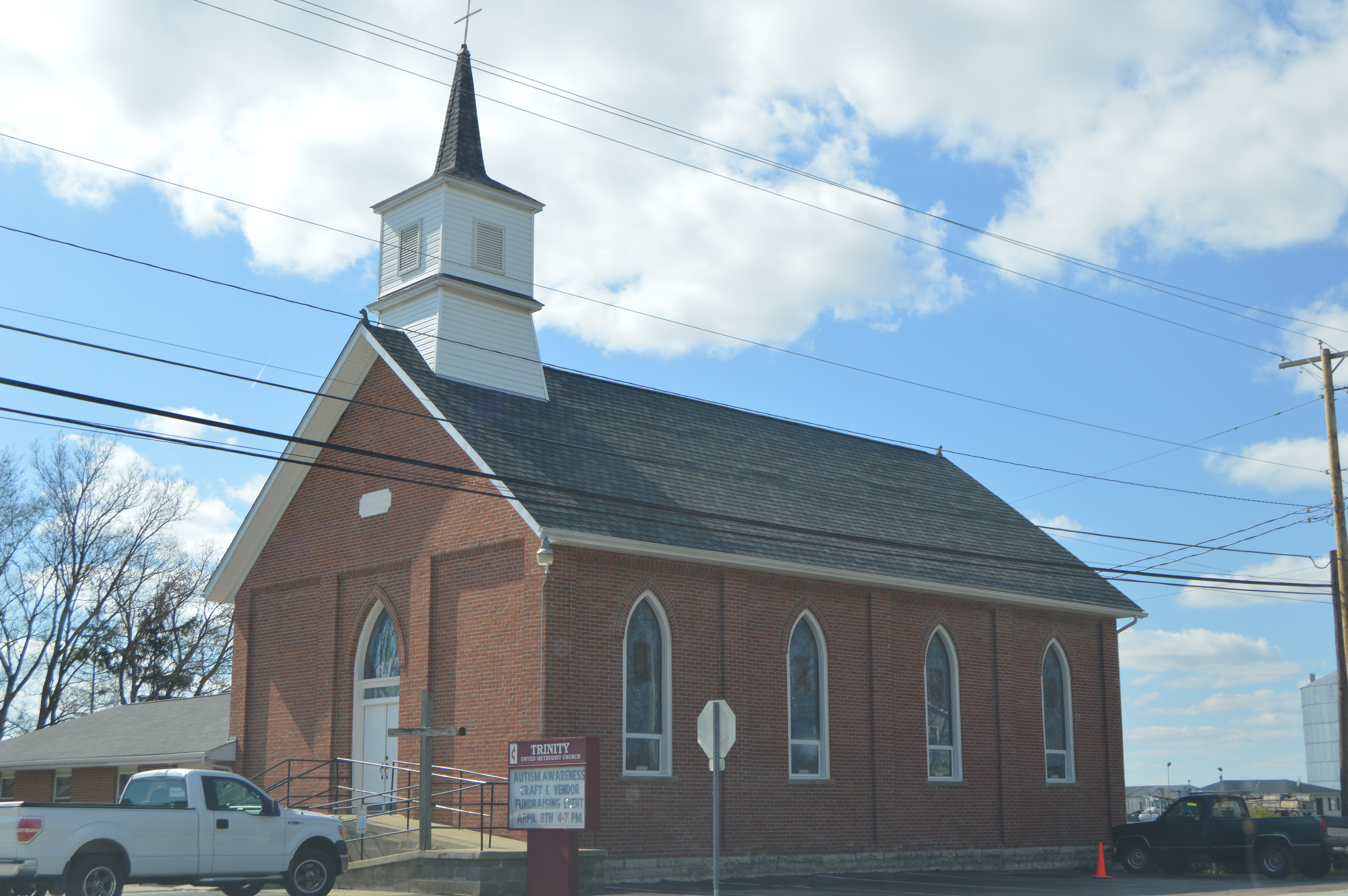
- Methodist church at Lilly Chapel

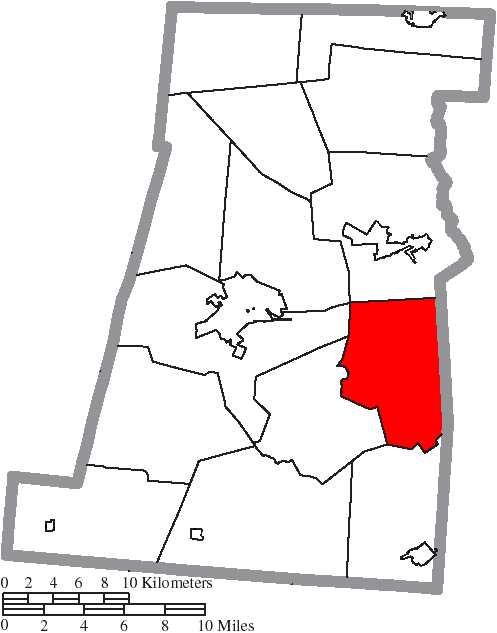
- Location of Fairfield Township in Madison County
- Coordinates: 39°51′20″N 83°16′23″W
- Country: United States
- State: Ohio
- County: Madison

Area
  - Total: 31.7 sq mi (82.0 km^{2})
  - Land: 31.7 sq mi (82.0 km^{2})
  - Water: 0 sq mi (0.0 km^{2})
- Elevation: 994 ft (303 m)

Population (2020)
  - Total: 1,452
  - Density: 45.9/sq mi (17.7/km^{2})
- Time zone: UTC-5 (Eastern (EST))
  - Summer (DST): UTC-4 (EDT)
- FIPS code: 39-26068
- GNIS feature ID: 1086543

Fairfield Township is one of the fourteen townships of Madison County, Ohio, United States. The 2020 census found 1,452 people in the township.

== Geography ==
Located in the eastern part of the county, it borders the following townships:

- Jefferson Township - north
- Pleasant Township, Franklin County - east
- Darby Township, Pickaway County - southeast
- Pleasant Township - south
- Oak Run Township - southwest
- Union Township - west
- Deer Creek Township - northwest corner

The communities of Kiousville and Lilly Chapel are located within the township.

== Name and history ==
It is one of seven Fairfield Townships statewide.

== Government ==
The township is governed by a three-member board of trustees, who are elected in November of odd-numbered years to a four-year term beginning on the following January 1. Two are elected in the year after the presidential election and one is elected in the year before it. There is also an elected township fiscal officer, who serves a four-year term beginning on April 1 of the year after the election, which is held in November of the year before the presidential election. Vacancies in the fiscal officership or on the board of trustees are filled by the remaining trustees.
