= Kiousville, Ohio =

- Unincorporated community
- Location within Ohio Location within the United States
- Coordinates: 39°47′50″N 83°17′41″W
- Country: United States
- State: Ohio
- Counties: Madison
- Townships: Fairfield, Pleasant
- Elevation: 935 ft (285 m)
- Time zone: UTC-5 (Eastern (EST))
  - Summer (DST): UTC-4 (EDT)
- ZIP Code: 43143 (Mount Sterling)
- Area code: 740
- GNIS feature ID: 1070802

Kiousville is an unincorporated community in southern Fairfield and northern Pleasant townships, Madison County, Ohio, United States. It is located at the intersection of Kiousville-Georgesville Road and McKendree Road.

== History ==
The community was originally known as Warnersville, after the owner of the land, Mr. Warner. The first store opened about 1867. The first post office was established on January 27, 1875, as the Warnersville Post Office, with R. Watrous as the postmaster. The Warnersville Post Office was discontinued on June 17, 1879.

On February 28, 1881, the post office was re-established as the Kiousville Post Office, but was again discontinued on September 15, 1900. The mail service is now sent through the Mount Sterling branch. As of 1915, the community contained only a few houses, one general store, and one blacksmith.
