= Pleasant Township, Madison County, Ohio =

Township in Ohio, US

- Township
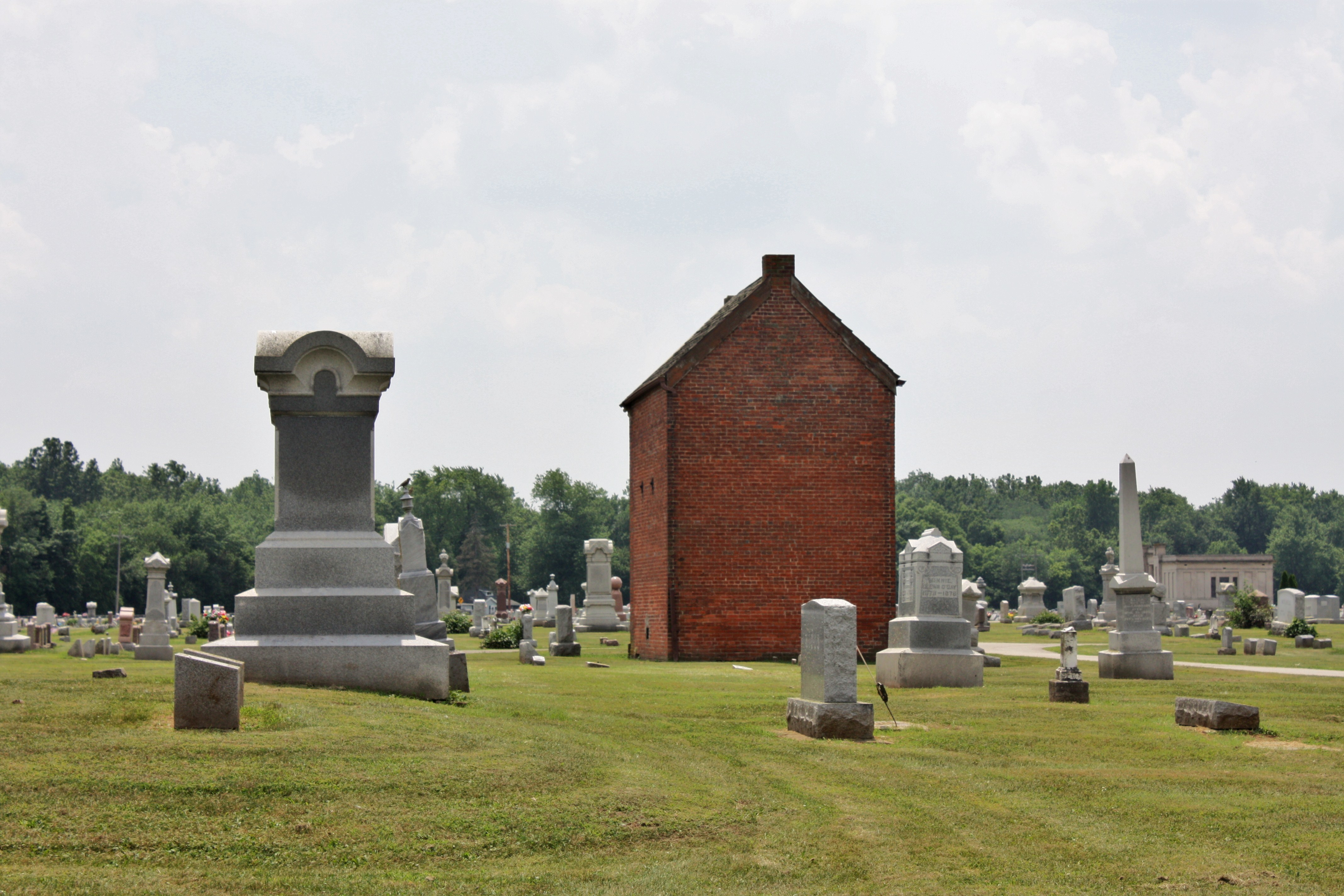
- Pleasant Cemetery, northeast of Mount Sterling

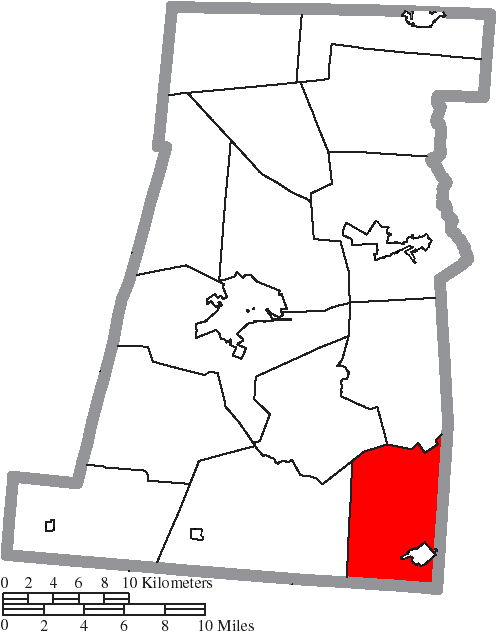
- Location of Pleasant Township in Madison County
- Coordinates: 39°43′39″N 83°16′14″W
- Country: United States
- State: Ohio
- County: Madison

Area
  - Total: 31.3 sq mi (81.0 km^{2})
  - Land: 31.3 sq mi (81.0 km^{2})
  - Water: 0 sq mi (0.0 km^{2})
- Elevation: 915 ft (279 m)

Population (2020)
  - Total: 3,272
  - Density: 105/sq mi (40.4/km^{2})
- Time zone: UTC-5 (Eastern (EST))
  - Summer (DST): UTC-4 (EDT)
- FIPS code: 39-63338
- GNIS feature ID: 1086550

Pleasant Township is one of the fourteen townships of Madison County, Ohio, United States. The 2020 census found 3,272 people in the township.

== Geography ==
Located in the southeastern corner of the county, it borders the following townships:

- Fairfield Township - north
- Darby Township, Pickaway County - east
- Monroe Township, Pickaway County - southeast
- Madison Township, Fayette County - south
- Range Township - west
- Oak Run Township - northwest

The village of Mount Sterling is located in southeastern Pleasant Township.

== Name and history ==
It is one of fifteen Pleasant Townships statewide.

== Government ==
The township is governed by a three-member board of trustees, who are elected in November of odd-numbered years to a four-year term beginning on the following January 1. Two are elected in the year after the presidential election and one is elected in the year before it. There is also an elected township fiscal officer, who serves a four-year term beginning on April 1 of the year after the election, which is held in November of the year before the presidential election. Vacancies in the fiscal officership or on the board of trustees are filled by the remaining trustees.
