= National Register of Historic Places listings in Union County, Ohio =

Location of Union County in Ohio

This is a list of the National Register of Historic Places listings in Union County, Ohio.

It is intended to be a complete list of the properties and districts on the National Register of Historic Places in Union County, Ohio, United States. The locations of National Register properties and districts for which the latitude and longitude coordinates are included below, may be seen in an online map.

There are 11 properties and districts listed on the National Register in the county.

This National Park Service list is complete through NPS recent listings posted October 30, 2026.

== Current listings ==
	Name on the Register	Image	Date listed	Location	City or town	Description
1	Ellis Mounds	Ellis Mounds	July 30, 1974 (#74001638)	Within the triangle formed by Hillview Rd., Wolford-Maskill Rd., and State Route 4, northeast of Marysville; 40°17′15″N 83°20′56″W	Paris Township	
2	Elmwood Place	Elmwood Place	November 29, 1979 (#79001972)	Southwest of Irwin on State Route 161; 40°07′09″N 83°29′03″W	Union Township	
3	The Fort	The Fort	July 8, 1982 (#82003662)	26953 North Lewisburg Rd., northeast of North Lewisburg; 40°13′55″N 83°33′01″W	Allen Township	
4	Gilcrist House	Gilcrist House	August 13, 1976 (#76001537)	3.5 miles southeast of downtown Marysville off U.S. Route 33; 40°12′30″N 83°18′53″W	Marysville	Destroyed
5	Harmon Building-Ohio Reformatory for Women		June 11, 2021 (#100006639)	1479 Collins Ave. 40°13′34″N 83°23′34″W	Marysville	
6	Dr. David W. Henderson House	Dr. David W. Henderson House	April 19, 2001 (#01000391)	318 E. 5th St. 40°14′11″N 83°21′49″W	Marysville	
7	Marysville Historic District	Marysville Historic District	February 1, 1978 (#78002201)	Roughly bounded by Maple, Plum, 4th, and 7th Sts. 40°14′08″N 83°22′06″W	Marysville	
8	Marysville Light and Water Company Plan		January 10, 2025 (#100011257)	409 North Main Street. 40°14′28″N 83°22′02″W	Marysville	
9	Oakdale Cemetery Historic District	Oakdale Cemetery Historic District	April 15, 2024 (#100010203)	1290 W. Fifth Street; 40°14′32″N 83°23′38″W	Marysville	
10	Reuben L. Partridge House		February 22, 2021 (#100006161)	245 West 7th St. 40°14′02″N 83°22′13″W	Marysville	
11	Reed Covered Bridge	Reed Covered Bridge	March 4, 1975 (#75001547)	3.5 miles south of Marysville off State Route 38; 40°08′59″N 83°22′50″W	Darby Township	150-feet long Partridge truss bridge. Collapsed in 1993

== See also ==
- List of National Historic Landmarks in Ohio
- Listings in neighboring counties: Champaign, Delaware, Franklin, Hardin, Logan, Madison, Marion
- National Register of Historic Places listings in Ohio
