= Bigelow Bridge =

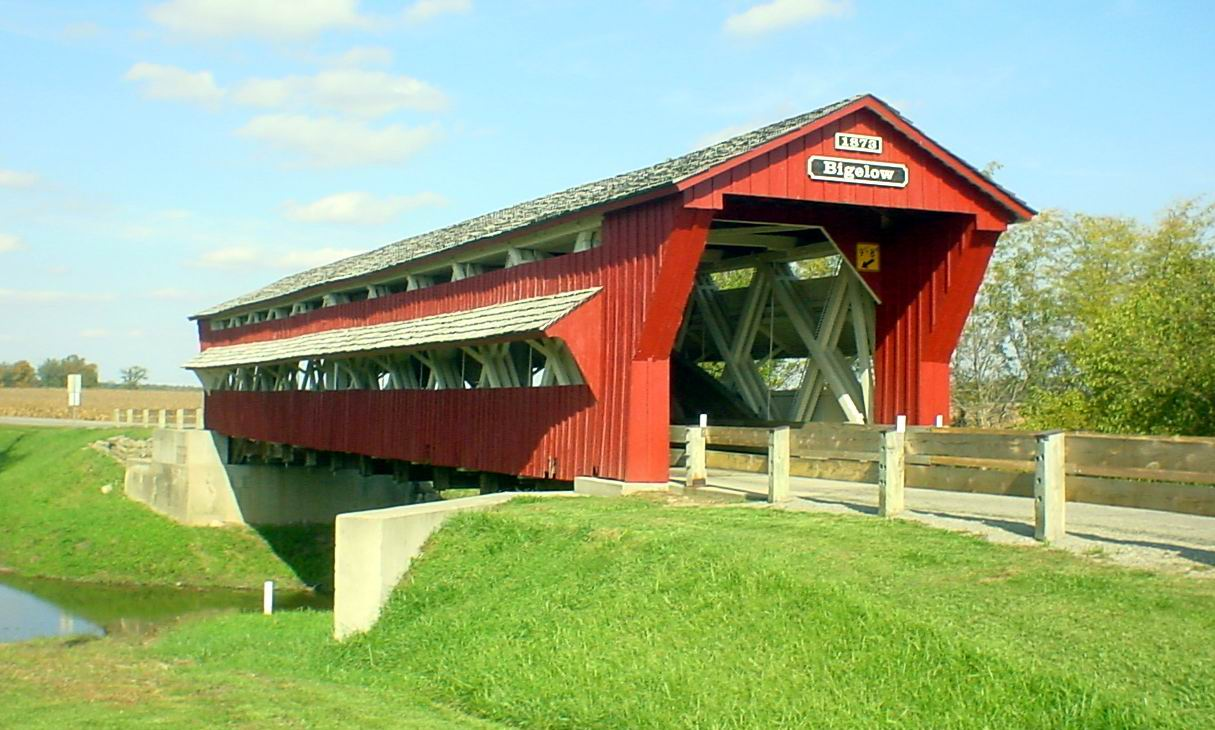
- Bigelow Bridge in 2009
- Coordinates: 40°06′58″N 83°25′30″W
- Carries: Motor vehicles, pedestrians
- Crosses: Little Darby Creek
- Locale: Union County, Ohio, United States
- Other name: Axe Handle Road Bridge
- Maintained by: Union County Engineer

Characteristics
- Design: Covered
- Total length: 100 feet (30 m)
- Width: 12.5 feet (3.8 m)
- Height: 12.5 feet (3.8 m)

History
- Designer: Reuben Partridge
- Opened: 1873

Statistics
- Daily traffic: 100 (as of 1951)

Location
- Interactive map of Bigelow Bridge

Bigelow Bridge (regionally known as Axe Handle Road Bridge) is one of six historic covered bridges in Union County, Ohio. It is located at 40°06′58″N 83°25′30″W, on Axe Handle Road just north of Ohio State Route 161 between Irwin and Chuckery, and crosses over the Little Darby Creek.

The wooden truss bridge was built in 1873 by Reuben Partridge, and named for Eliphas Bigelow, a nearby resident. It was refurbished including the addition of internal steel supports in 1990, and repainted in July 2008.

In November 2010, a historical marker was dedicated on the site by the Ohio Historical Society, honoring Bigelow Bridge and the surrounding Darby Plains region.
