= Darby Township =

Darby Township may refer to:

== Ohio ==
- Darby Township, Madison County, Ohio
- Darby Township, Pickaway County, Ohio
- Darby Township, Union County, Ohio

== Pennsylvania ==
- Darby Township, Delaware County, Pennsylvania
- Upper Darby Township, Pennsylvania
