= Tom Cannon Mound =

Prehistoric mound in Pleasant Township, Franklin County, Ohio

- U.S. National Register of Historic Places
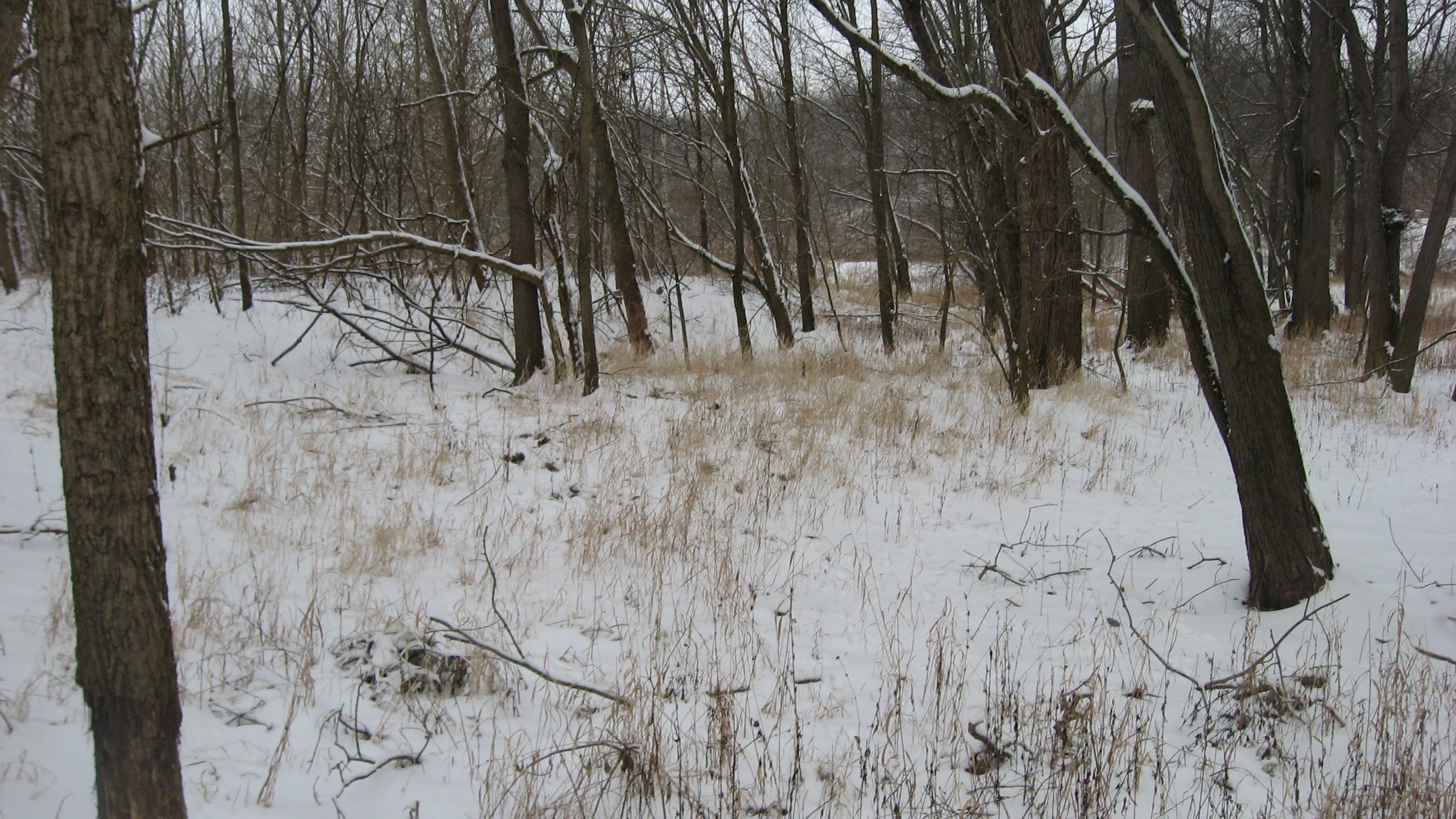
- Tom Cannon Mound in 2012

- Location within Ohio Location within the United States
- Location: Pleasant Township, Franklin County, Ohio, U.S.
- Coordinates: 39.8936°N 83.2180°W
- NRHP reference No.: 74001498
- Added to NRHP: May 2, 1974

Tom Cannon Mound is a prehistoric mound located in Pleasant Township, Franklin County, Ohio, at the confluence of Big Darby Creek and Little Darby Creek. It was listed in the National Register of Historic Places on May 2, 1974.

The mound was built by the Adena sometime between 500 BC and 400 AD. Minor excavations of the mound took place sometime in the 1940s, confirming the Adena constructed it.

== See also ==
- John Galbreath Mound
