= John Galbreath Mound =

Prehistoric mound in Galloway, Ohio

- U.S. National Register of Historic Places
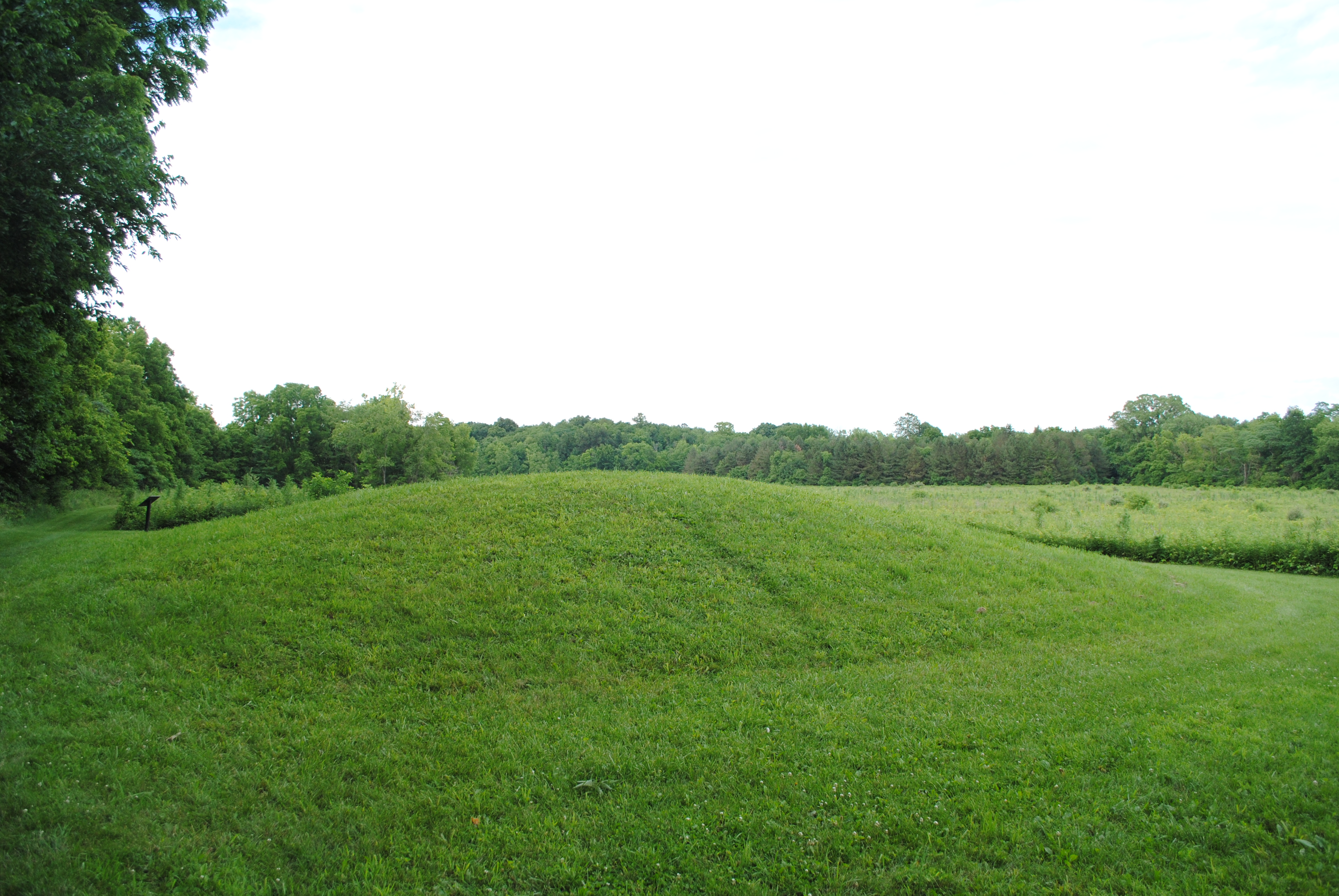
- John Galbreath Mound in 2011

- Location within Ohio Location within the United States
- Location: Battelle Darby Creek Metro Park, Galloway, Ohio
- Coordinates: 39.911944°N 83.221194°W
- Built: Prior to 500 AD
- Architect: Adena
- NRHP reference No.: 74001497
- Added to NRHP: July 15, 1974

John Galbreath Mound is a prehistoric mound located in Battelle Darby Creek Metro Park in Galloway, Ohio. It was listed on the National Register of Historic Places in 1974.

The exact date the mound was constructed is unknown, but was made at some point prior to 500 AD and after 500 BC. It follows elements of Adena culture, which existed in the Ohio Valley for centuries. It is named after John W. Galbreath.

== See also ==
- Tom Cannon Mound
