= Plumwood, Ohio =

- Census-designated place
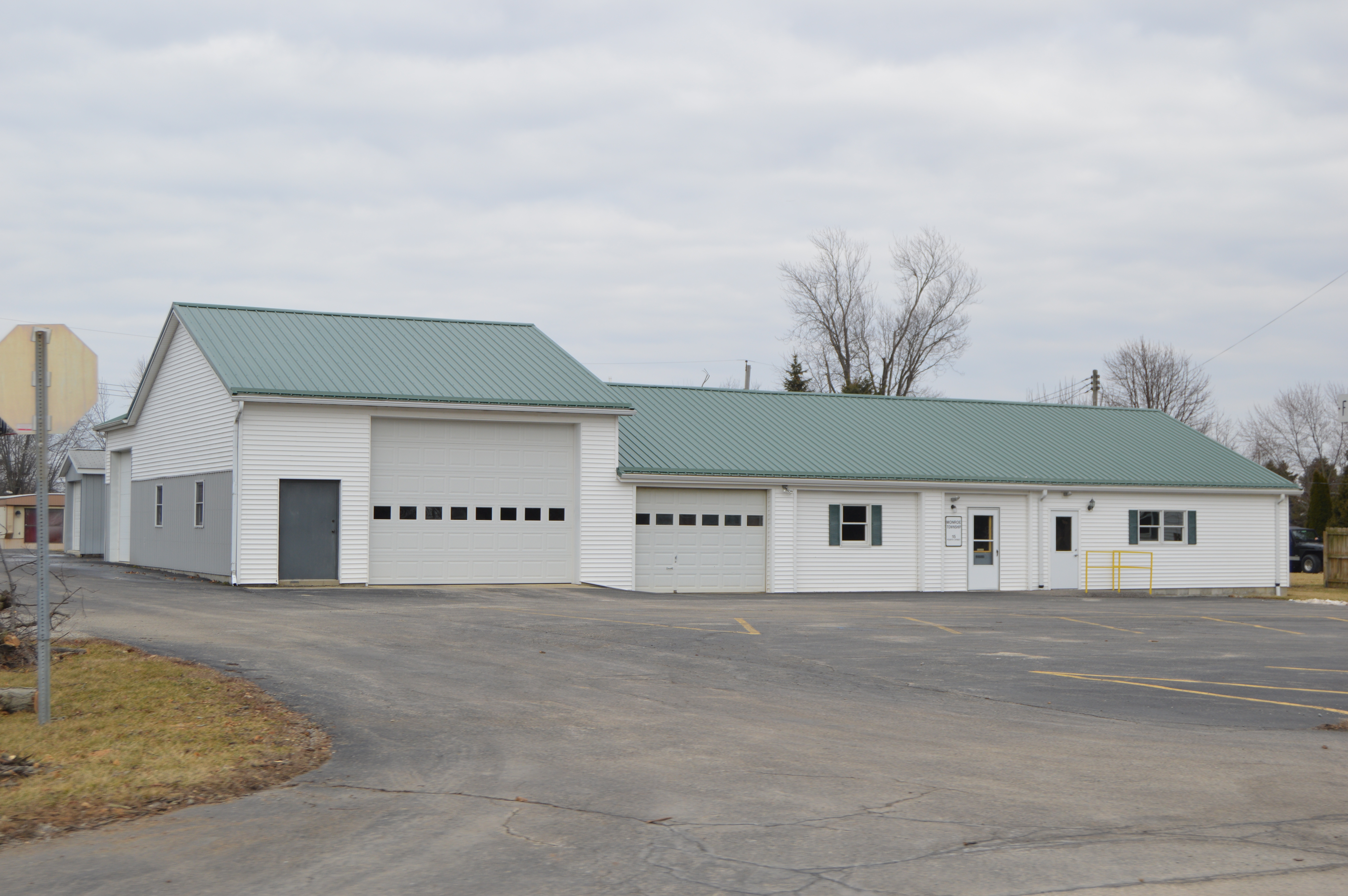
- Monroe Township hall

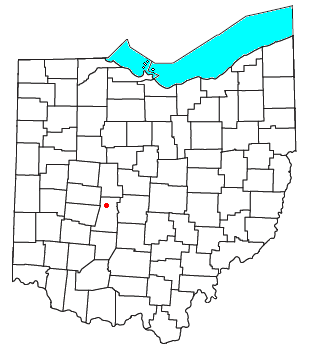
- Location in Ohio
- Coordinates: 40°00′32″N 83°24′53″W
- Country: United States
- State: Ohio
- County: Madison
- Township: Monroe

Area
  - Total: 0.62 sq mi (1.61 km^{2})
  - Land: 0.62 sq mi (1.61 km^{2})
  - Water: 0 sq mi (0.00 km^{2})
- Elevation: 1,007 ft (307 m)

Population (2020)
  - Total: 257
  - Density: 413.4/sq mi (159.61/km^{2})
- Time zone: UTC-5 (Eastern (EST))
  - Summer (DST): UTC-4 (EDT)
- ZIP Code: 43140 (London)
- FIPS code: 39-63758
- GNIS feature ID: 2628953

Plumwood is an unincorporated community and census-designated place in central Monroe Township, Madison County, Ohio, United States. As of the 2020 census, the population was 257.

== History ==
Plumwood was originally laid out on December 23, 1895, by Charles F. Sanford. The community was originally named Sanford, but the name was later changed. As of 1915, the community was one of the largest trade posts in the county, with three large general stores, a blacksmith, six threshing outfits, three hay baling outfits, and the population was 200.

Historical population
Census	Pop.	Note	%±
2010	319		—
2020	257		−19.4%
U.S. Decennial Census

== Geography ==
Plumwood is in northern Madison County, sitting at the intersection of State Route 38 with Arthur Bradley Road, 9 miles (14 km) north of London, the Madison county seat, and 17 miles (27 km) south of Marysville. Columbus, the state capital, is 24 miles (39 km) to the east.

According to the U.S. Census Bureau, the Plumwood CDP has an area of 0.62 square miles (1.61 km^{2}), all land. The Spring Fork of Little Darby Creek flows past the community to its south and west, part of the Scioto River watershed.

== Education ==
Plumwood is in the Jonathan Alder School District, which operates Jonathan Alder High School.
