= Marysville Historic District =

Marysville Historic District may refer to:

- Marysville Historic District (Marysville, Ohio), one of the National Register of Historic Places listings in Union County, Ohio
- Marysville Historic District (Marysville, New Brunswick), Canada
