= Bridgeport, Union County, Ohio =

Unincorporated community in Ohio, U.S.

Coordinates: 40°09′38″N 83°23′41″W

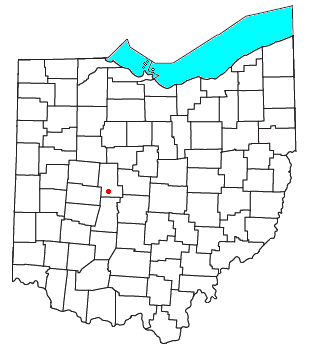
Location of Bridgeport in Union County, Ohio

Bridgeport is an unincorporated community in far western Darby Township, Union County, Ohio, United States. It lies at the intersection of State Route 38 with Orchard Road, midway between the villages of Milford Center and Unionville Center. At Bridgeport, Buck Run meets the Big Darby Creek, which meets the Scioto River at Circleville. It is located 6 miles (9.7 km) south of Marysville, the county seat of Union County.
