= Rosedale, Ohio =

- Unincorporated community
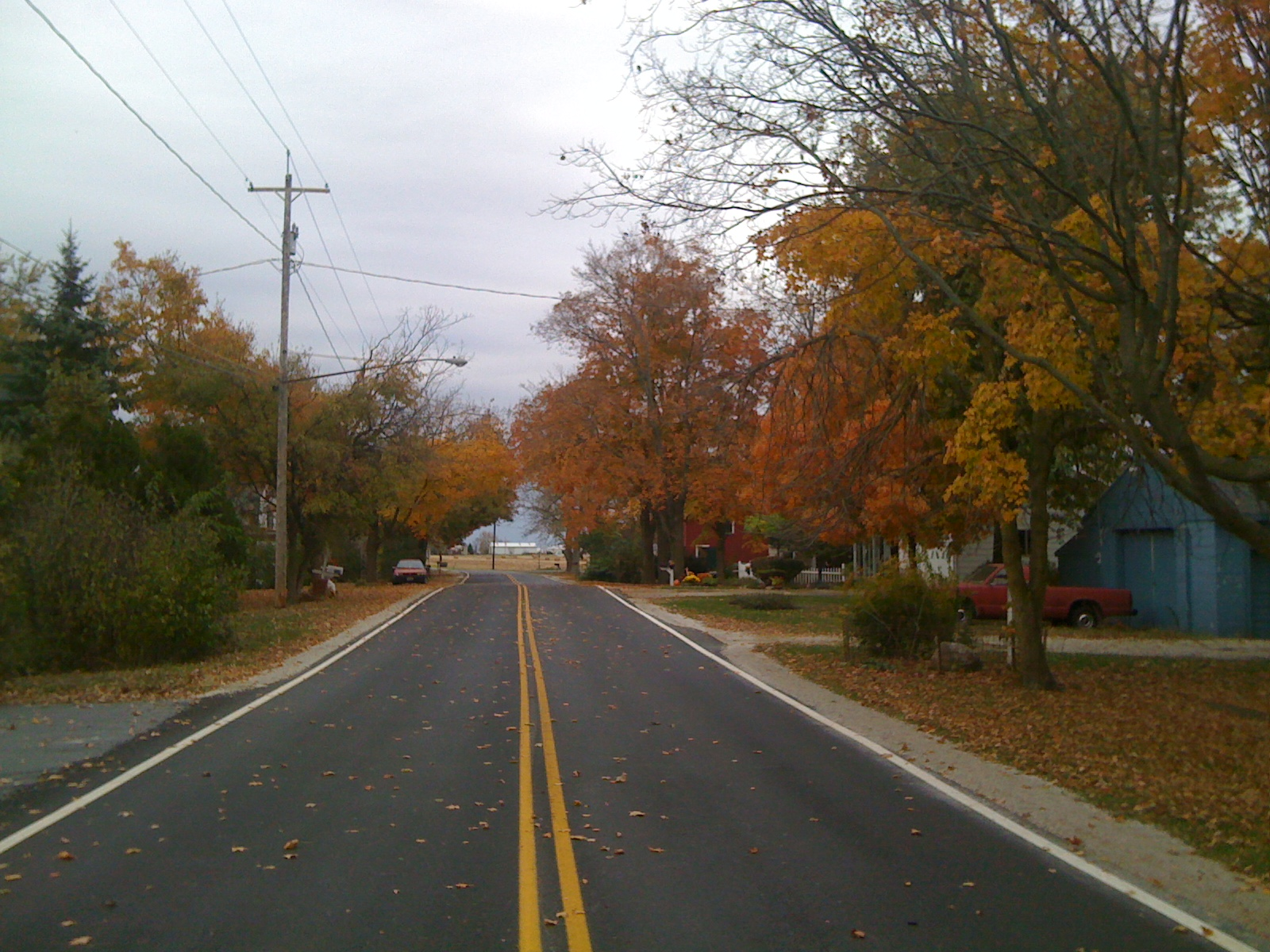
- Rosedale, Ohio in Fall

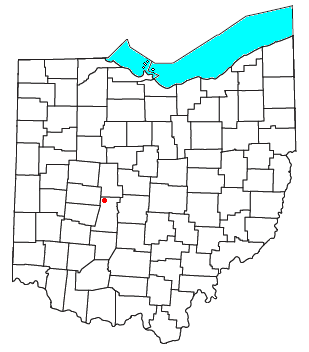
- Location of Rosedale, Ohio
- Coordinates: 40°04′41″N 83°27′18″W
- Country: United States
- State: Ohio
- County: Madison
- Township: Pike
- Elevation: 1,011 ft (308 m)

Population (2010)
  - Total: 580
- Time zone: UTC-5 (Eastern (EST))
  - Summer (DST): UTC-4 (EDT)
- ZIP Code: 43029 (Irwin)
- Area code: 740
- GNIS feature ID: 1065246

Rosedale is an unincorporated community in central Pike Township, Madison County, Ohio, United States, and roughly thirty miles (48 kilometers) west of the city of Columbus.

== History ==
The Rosedale Post Office was established on June 3, 1830, with Captain Andrews as the first postmaster. In 1832, he purchased 1,300 acres (530 ha) of land, named the place "Rosedale Farms" after the post office, and opened a store at the intersection of Rosedale Road and Rosedale-Milford Center Road. Later, Darius Burnham laid out the community of Liverpool on land he owned near Rosedale, and the plat was recorded on May 18, 1836, in London. From 1837 to 1838, Foster Griffin became the postmaster and moved the post office from the rural country into Liverpool. Soon after, the community changed its name to match the post office. The Rosedale Post Office was discontinued on October 14, 1867, re-established on January 17, 1870, then discontinued again on September 30, 1901. The mail service was then sent through the Mechanicsburg branch. In 1905, the Pike township high school was built in the community, at a cost of $12,000. As of 1915, the community contained one general store, one blacksmith, and a population of 60.

In 1964 Conservative Mennonite Bible School, a Bible college owned by the Conservative Mennonite Conference (now known as the Rosedale Network of Churches), purchased the former high school building and moved to Rosedale from Berlin, Ohio. The school was later renamed Rosedale Bible College. Also in the mid-1960s Conservative Mennonite Conference (now the Rosedale Network of Churches) moved its headquarters to the community.

== Geography and topography ==
The community is located between the Spring Fork and main channel of the Little Darby Creek to the northwest of their confluence. This puts the community on the western edge of the Scioto Watershed. The area was originally a wetland of prairie grass and moisture tolerant trees, and now boasts rich and productive farmland of primarily soy beans, corn and wheat.

== Economy ==
The town is the home of several denomination-wide agencies of the Rosedale Network of Churches, including Rosedale Bible College, Choice Books Great Lakes-Rosedale, and the administrative offices of the Conservative Mennonite Conference. The Conference's mission agency, Rosedale Mennonite Missions, was headquartered in Rosedale for several decades but relocated to Columbus, Ohio in 2015 and was subsequently renamed Rosedale International. Rosedale has one church, the Rosedale Free Will Baptist Church.
