= Battelle Darby Creek Metro Park =

Park and nature preserve in Central Ohio, U.S.

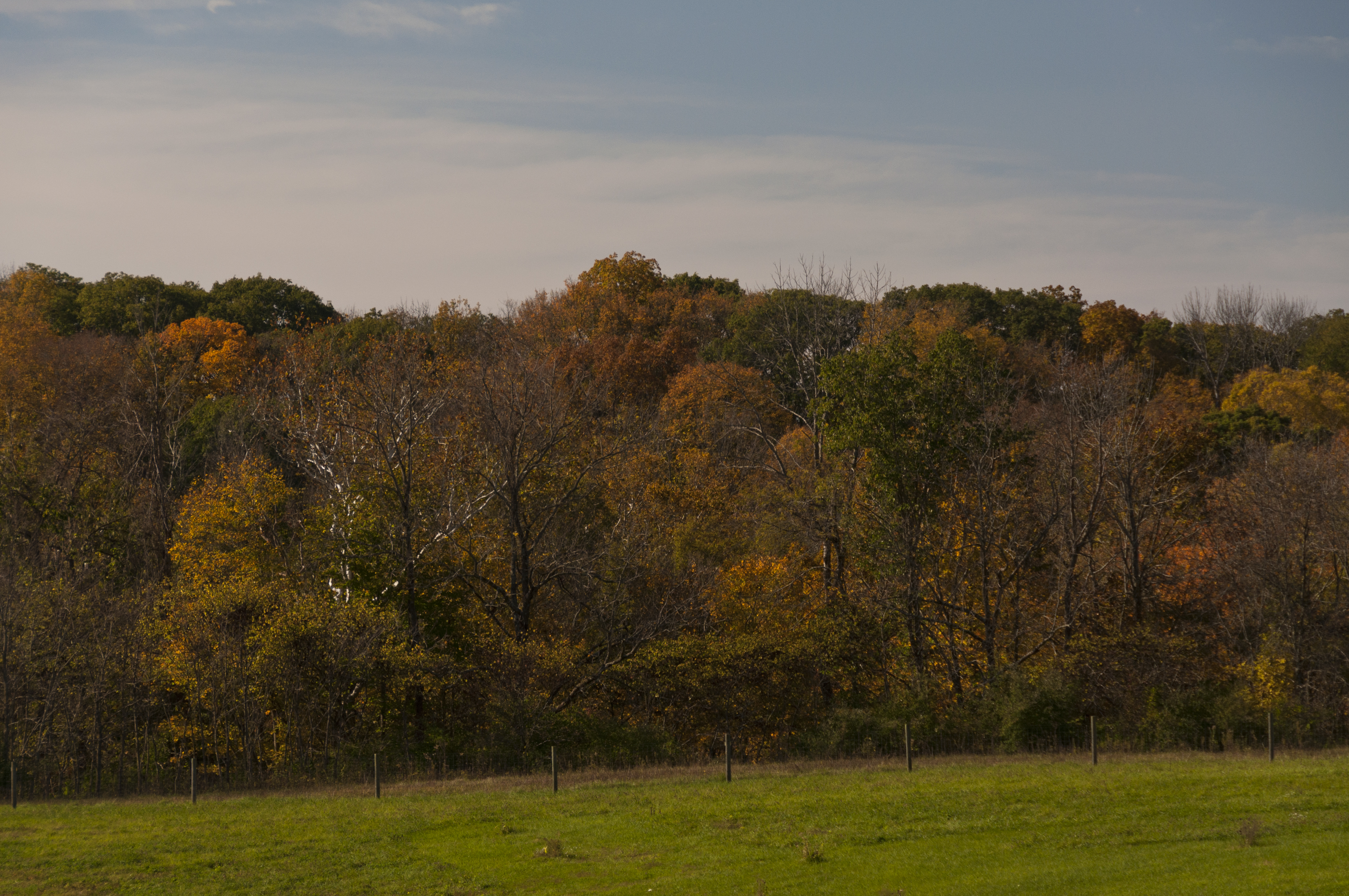
- Interactive map of Battelle Darby Creek Metro Park
- Type: Metro park
- Location: 1775 Darby Creek Dr., Galloway, Ohio
- Coordinates: 39°54′13″N 83°12′56″W
- Area: 7,358 acres (2,978 ha)
- Administrator: Columbus and Franklin County Metro Parks
- Open: Year-round
- Parking: Multiple lots
- Website: Official website

Battelle Darby Creek Metro Park is a metropolitan park in Central Ohio, owned and operated by Columbus and Franklin County Metro Parks. The park is within the Pleasant and Prairie townships, southwest of Columbus. It is the largest park in the Metro Parks system, with 7,358 acres (2,978 ha).

The park encompasses lands and creek beds north & south of the confluence of the Big & Little Darby Creeks. Unique features include restored tallgrass prairie areas totalling 2,000 acres (810 ha) that house a group of 10 American bison, a large nature center with exhibits about the exceptional biodiversity of Big Darby Creek, and a Fort Ancient mound. Thirteen miles of the Big Darby Creek and Little Darby Creek flow through the park. Much of the land for the park was donated by the Battelle Memorial Institute. The northern parcel lies just outside the town of West Jefferson (in Madison County). The park follows the Darby Creeks south past the village of Georgesville and continues towards the crossroads of Darbydale. Detached parcels of the park extend along Darby Creek to the village of Harrisburg (into Pickaway County).

== History ==
In the 1945 report recommending the formation of the Metro Park system, the Big Darby and Little Darby creeks were identified as a site of a future park. In 1950, the organization began acquiring land that would become the Darby Creek Metro Park. The park opened to the public in 1959 with 119 acres.

In the 1960s, the US Army Corps of Engineers began making plans to construct a dam on Big Darby Creek to provide flood control in the Big Darby Creek Watershed, the Scioto River Basin, and the Ohio River Valley. The project was riddled with issues including the discovery of an underground hole, construction delays, rising costs, and public opposition. Due to the issues, the project was put on hold and eventually decommissioned in 1978. In 1984, the park acquired the 834 acres earmarked for the dam.

The Big Darby is one of the most biologically diverse aquatic systems in the Midwestern United States. Recognizing the need for conservation, Metro Parks wrote a proposal to the Board of Trustees of the Battelle Memorial Institute Foundation requesting a grant to acquire 2,440 acres of land. Battelle offered one million dollars to the project, with additional funding coming from the US Department of the Interior’s Heritage Conservation and Recreation Service and the US Federal Bureau of Outdoor Recreation. After this acquisition, the park was renamed as Battelle Darby Creek Metro Park.

The park's prairies were former homes of the American bison and in February 2011, six female bison arrived making their home in two prairie enclosures. A nature center was opened in 2012, where visitors can view the herd.
