= Darby Township, Madison County, Ohio =

Township in Ohio, US

- Township
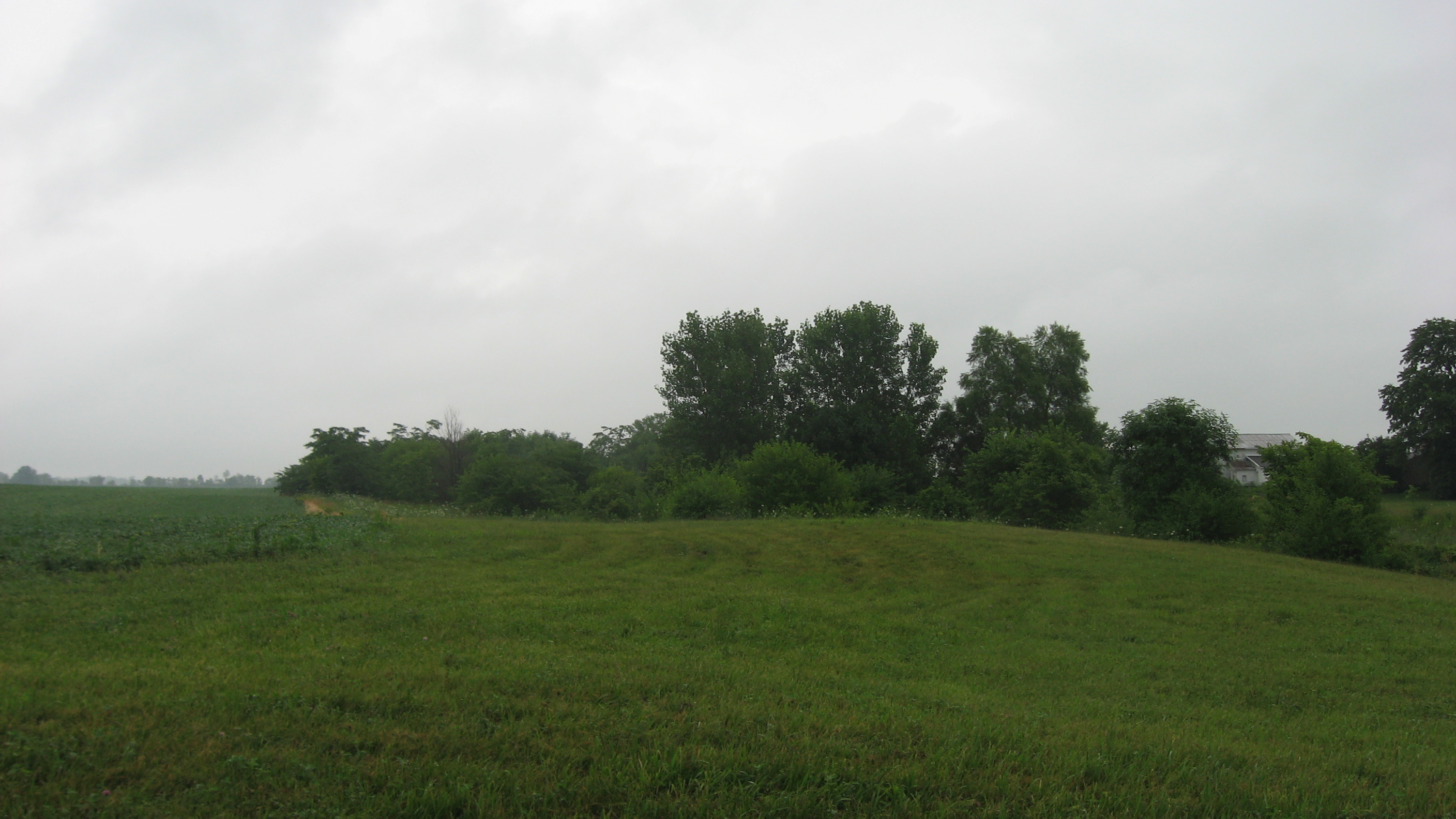
- Fields southeast of Plain City

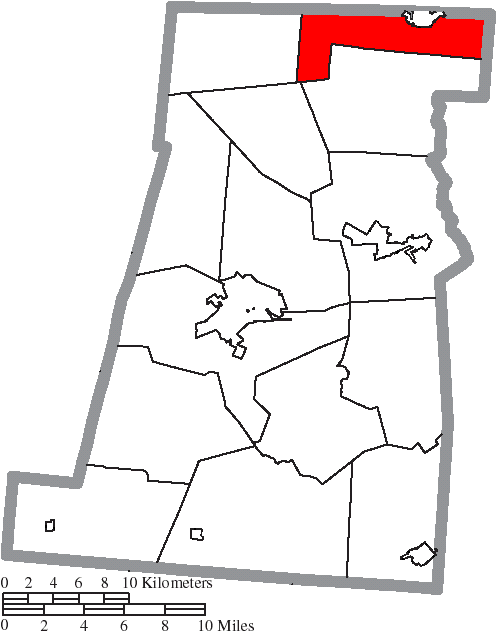
- Location of Darby Township in Madison County
- Coordinates: 40°6′8″N 83°16′23″W
- Country: United States
- State: Ohio
- County: Madison

Area
  - Total: 21.3 sq mi (55.2 km^{2})
  - Land: 21.3 sq mi (55.2 km^{2})
  - Water: 0 sq mi (0.0 km^{2})
- Elevation: 945 ft (288 m)

Population (2020)
  - Total: 4,261
  - Density: 200/sq mi (77.2/km^{2})
- Time zone: UTC-5 (Eastern (EST))
  - Summer (DST): UTC-4 (EDT)
- FIPS code: 39-20142
- GNIS feature ID: 1086541

Darby Township is one of the fourteen townships of Madison County, Ohio, United States. The 2020 census found 4,261 people in the township.

== Geography ==
Located in the northeastern corner of the county, it borders the following townships:

- Darby Township, Union County - north
- Jerome Township, Union County - northeast
- Washington Township, Franklin County - east
- Canaan Township - south
- Monroe Township - southwest
- Pike Township - west

Part of the village of Plain City is located in northeastern Darby Township.

The unincorported community of Kileville is located in the Northeast corner of the township, close to the tripoint with Union and Franklin counties.

== Name and history ==
As of 1854, the population of the township was 551, 1,504 in 1890, 1,558 in 1900, and 1,414 in 1910. Statewide, other Darby Townships are located in Pickaway and Union counties.

Darby Township is named after the Big Darby Creek which flows North to South in the township, parallel to the adjacent Plain City - Georgesville Road.

== Government ==
The township is governed by a three-member board of trustees, who are elected in November of odd-numbered years to a four-year term beginning on the following January 1. Two are elected in the year after the presidential election and one is elected in the year before it. There is also an elected township fiscal officer, who serves a four-year term beginning on April 1 of the year after the election, which is held in November of the year before the presidential election. Vacancies in the fiscal officership or on the board of trustees are filled by the remaining trustees.
