= Reuben Partridge =

American pioneer and engineer

- Born: September 10, 1832; Wilmington, New York, US
- Died: July 17, 1900 (aged 67); Marysville, Ohio, US
- Other names: "The Bridge Builder"
- Occupation: Engineer
- Years active: 1855-1900
- Known for: Bridges

Reuben L. Partridge (September 10, 1823 – July 17, 1900) was an American pioneer and engineer in Union County, Ohio, known locally as "The Bridge Builder".

== Early life ==
Reuben Partridge was born September 10, 1823, in Wilmington, New York, to Cyrus and Lucinda Partridge, he was one of four children. Prior to 1836, his family moved from New York to Franklin County, Ohio. When Partridge was 13 years old, his father died. His mother moved them to Marysville in Union County, where her son from a previous marriage, Rowland Lee, was an accomplished wagon maker. Partridge attended school for a short time, then spent over 8 years building carriages with his family. After that, he became interested in bridge building. On October 20, 1846, he married Marysville native Maria Wolford (1825-1901), and they had 6 children.

== Bridge Builder ==
Due to the design of local bridges at the time, they would sometimes crumple under the sudden stress of heavy rains. Partridge saw this and worked to design a new truss and brace system to support additional stresses including vehicle traffic. In 1855, he built the first self-supporting bridge in Union County. On June 11, 1872, he received a patent for a new U-shaped truss bridge design, the "Partridge Truss" (Patent #127,791). As of 1882, Partridge was responsible for having built 90% of the bridges in Union County, and by 1883 had built over 125 in total. In 1886, he moved to Columbus, and worked as the Vice President of the Columbus Bridge Company for the next 10 years. While most of the bridges he built were wooden covered bridges of the "Partridge truss" design, he did design and build some iron bridges while with Columbus Bridge Company.

Partridge moved back to Marysville in 1896, to a house he designed and built for his wife on West 7th Street. He died 4 years later, on July 17, 1900, from complications after breaking his leg falling through a bridge he was supervising the removal of in Taylor Township north of Marysville. Over the course of his life, Partridge built over 200 bridges across Union County and central Ohio. He was also an active member of the first militia formed in Union County, a Marysville city council member, township clerk, township trustee, and avid supporter of the local veterans of the Mexican War and Civil War. He is buried at the Oakdale Cemetery in Marysville.

== Historic bridges ==
Partridge built four of the six historic wooden covered bridges still standing in Union County today, the Bigelow Bridge (1873), Cullbertson Bridge (1872), Pottersburg Bridge (1872), and Spain Creek Bridge (1883). The Reed Bridge (1884) was originally on this list also, but collapsed in August 1993. The only other bridge of Partridge's that is still standing outside of Union County is the Bergstresser Covered Bridge (1887) near Canal Winchester, which is listed on the National Register of Historic Places.

== Legacy ==
In 2010, the city of Marysville commissioned a large public mural located at 40°14.245′N 83°22.022′W in Uptown Marysville in honor of Partridge. It was painted by Columbus artist Curtis Goldstein, and paid for in part by a grant from Dayton Power & Light.

On February 22, 2021, Partridge's house in Marysville was listed on the National Register of Historic Places.
