= Union Township, Union County, Ohio =

Township in Ohio, US

- Township
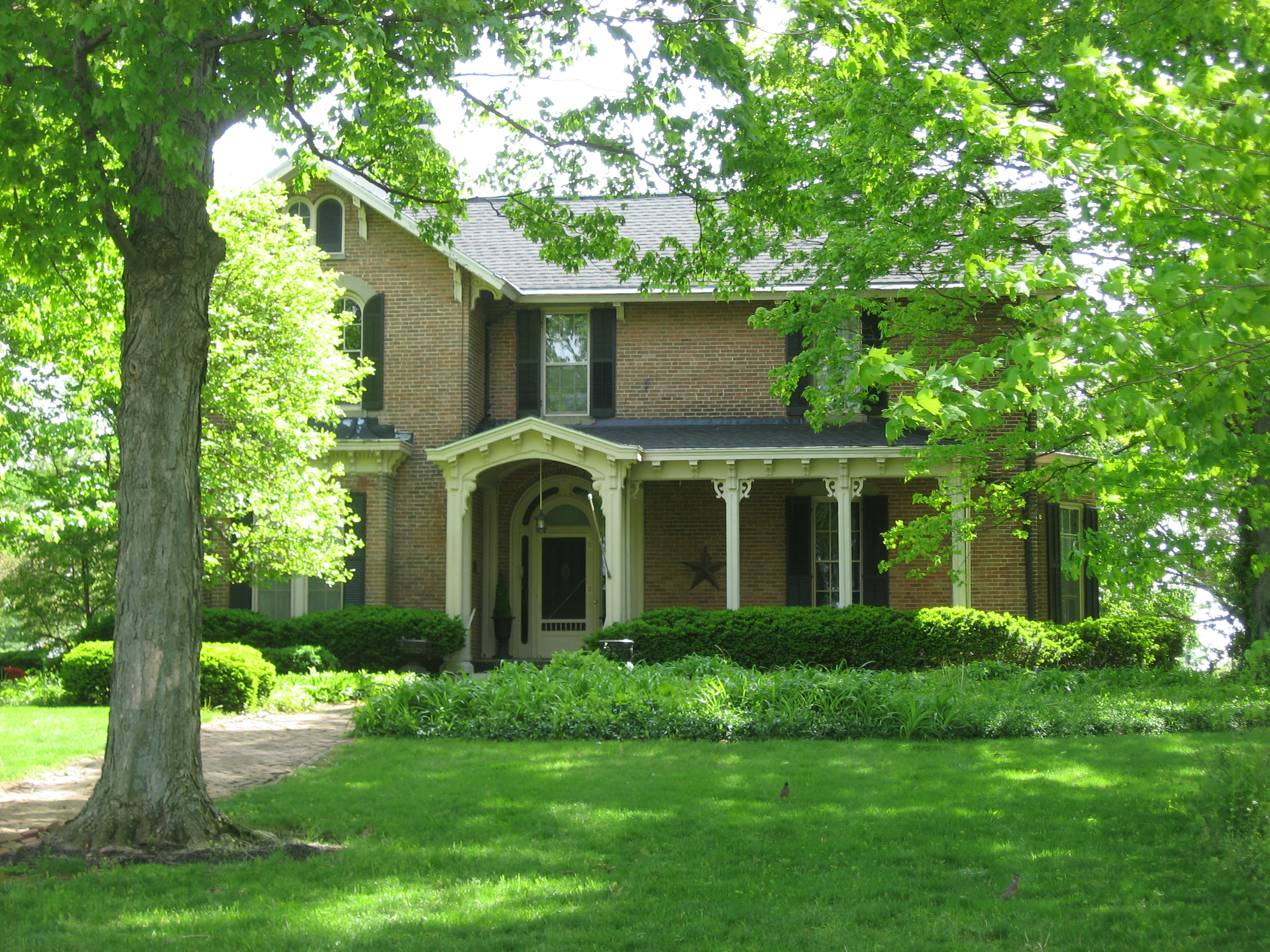
- Elmwood Place farmhouse on State Route 161

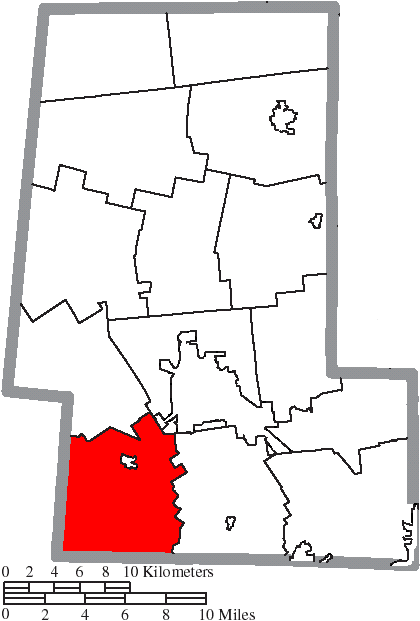
- Location of Union Township in Union County
- Coordinates: 40°9′13″N 83°27′11″W
- Country: United States
- State: Ohio
- County: Union

Area
  - Total: 36.0 sq mi (93.3 km^{2})
  - Land: 35.9 sq mi (93.1 km^{2})
  - Water: 0.077 sq mi (0.2 km^{2})
- Elevation: 994 ft (303 m)

Population (2020)
  - Total: 1,710
  - Density: 48/sq mi (18.4/km^{2})
- Time zone: UTC-5 (Eastern (EST))
  - Summer (DST): UTC-4 (EDT)
- FIPS code: 39-78582
- GNIS feature ID: 1087084

Union Township is one of the fourteen townships of Union County, Ohio, United States. The 2020 census found 1,710 people in the township, 807 of whom lived in the village of Milford Center.

== Geography ==
Located in the southwestern corner of the county, it borders the following townships:

- Allen Township - north
- Paris Township - northeast
- Darby Township - east
- Pike Township, Madison County - south
- Goshen Township, Champaign County - southwest
- Rush Township, Champaign County - west

The village of Milford Center is located in northern Union Township, and the unincorporated community of Irwin lies in the township's southwest.

== Name and history ==
Union Township was established in 1820. It is one of twenty-seven Union Townships statewide.

== Government ==
The township is governed by a three-member board of trustees, who are elected in November of odd-numbered years to a four-year term beginning on the following January 1. Two are elected in the year after the presidential election and one is elected in the year before it. There is also an elected township fiscal officer, who serves a four-year term beginning on April 1 of the year after the election, which is held in November of the year before the presidential election. Vacancies in the fiscal officership or on the board of trustees are filled by the remaining trustees.
