= Pike Township, Madison County, Ohio =

Township in Ohio, US

- Township
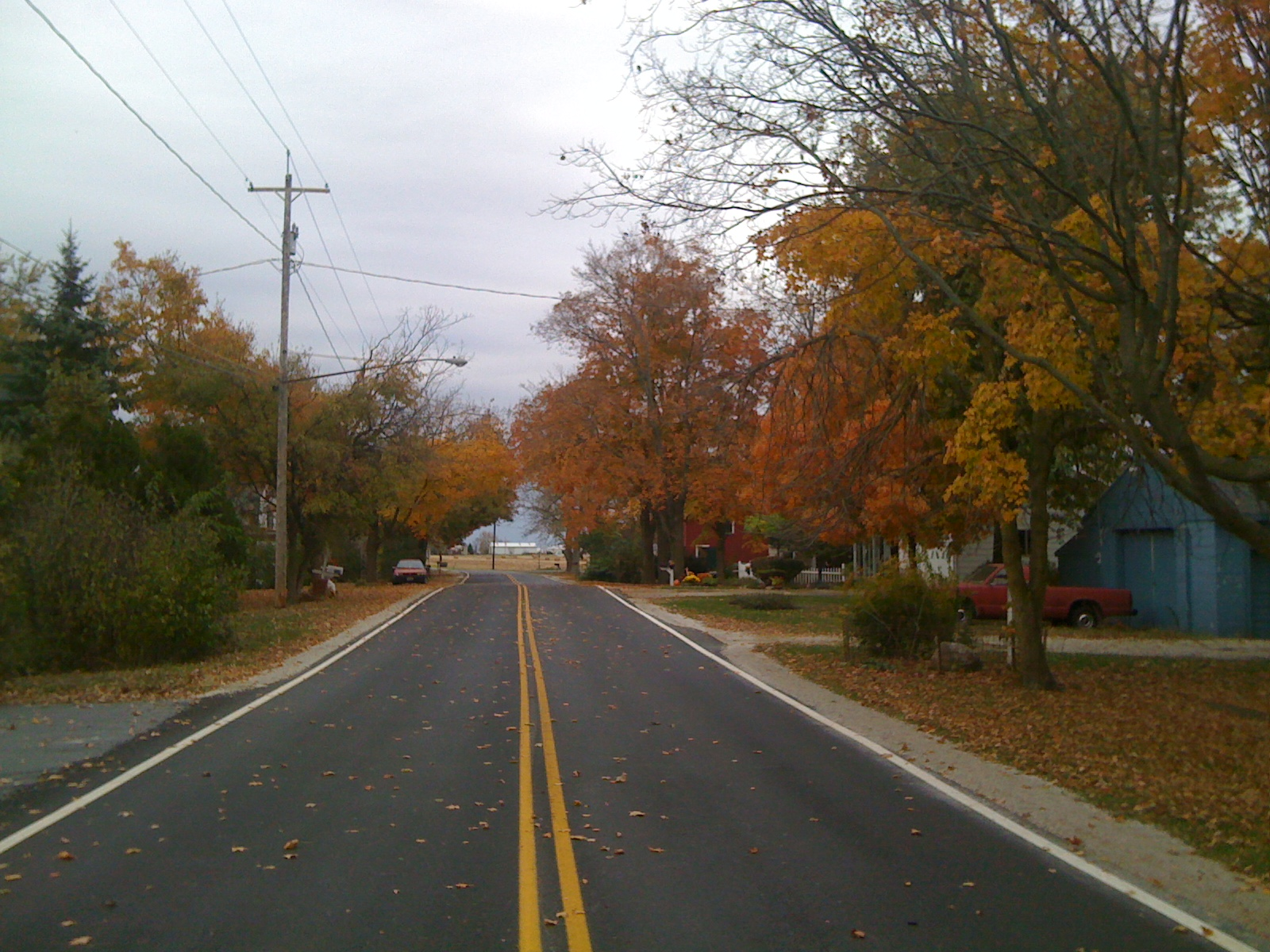
- Community scene in Rosedale

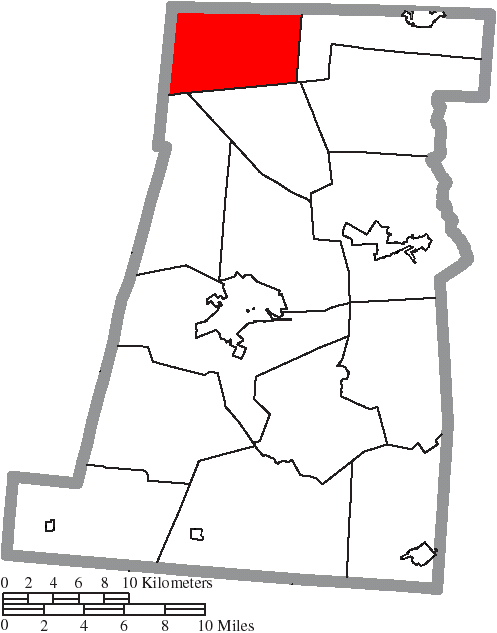
- Location of Pike Township in Madison County
- Coordinates: 40°4′47″N 83°26′36″W
- Country: United States
- State: Ohio
- County: Madison

Area
  - Total: 25.9 sq mi (67.2 km^{2})
  - Land: 25.9 sq mi (67.2 km^{2})
  - Water: 0 sq mi (0.0 km^{2})
- Elevation: 1,007 ft (307 m)

Population (2020)
  - Total: 545
  - Density: 21.0/sq mi (8.11/km^{2})
- Time zone: UTC-5 (Eastern (EST))
  - Summer (DST): UTC-4 (EDT)
- FIPS code: 39-62666
- GNIS feature ID: 1086549

Pike Township is one of the fourteen townships of Madison County, Ohio, United States. The 2020 census found 545 people in the township.

== Geography ==
Located in the northwestern corner of the county, it borders the following townships:

- Union Township, Union County - north
- Darby Township, Union County - northeast
- Darby Township - east
- Monroe Township - south
- Somerford Township - southwest
- Goshen Township, Champaign County - west

No municipalities are located in Pike Township, although the unincorporated community of Rosedale lies in the township's center.

== Name and history ==
It is one of eight Pike Townships statewide.

== Government ==
The township is governed by a three-member board of trustees, who are elected in November of odd-numbered years to a four-year term beginning on the following January 1. Two are elected in the year after the presidential election and one is elected in the year before it. There is also an elected township fiscal officer, who serves a four-year term beginning on April 1 of the year after the election, which is held in November of the year before the presidential election. Vacancies in the fiscal officership or on the board of trustees are filled by the remaining trustees.
