= Rosedale Bible College =

Private Anabaptist college in Ohio

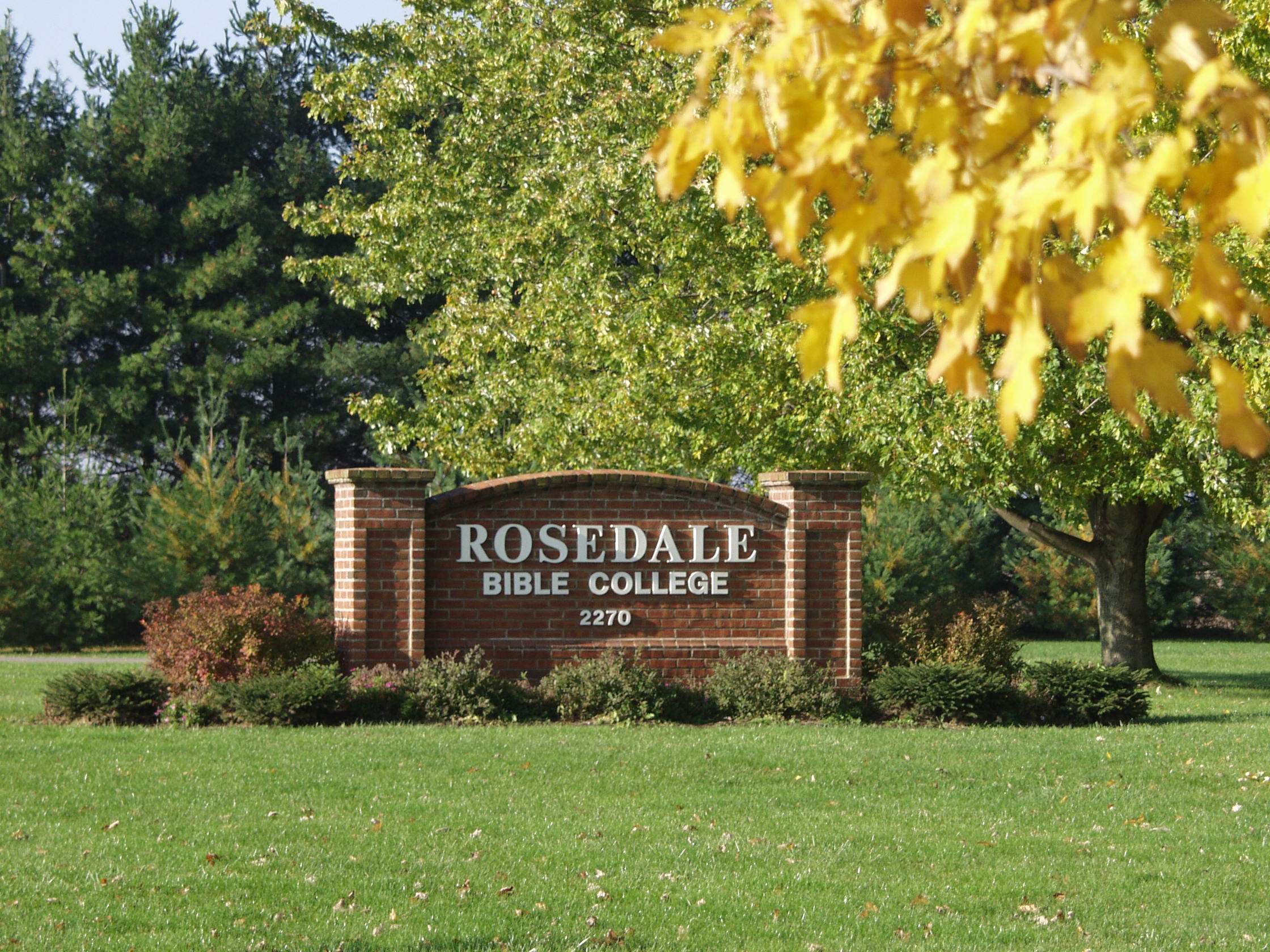
- Former names: Rosedale Bible Institute (1964–2001)
- Motto: Preparing Kingdom Workers
- Type: Private junior Bible college
- Established: 1952; 74 years ago
- Religious affiliation: Rosedale Network of Churches
- President: Jeremy Miller
- Location: Rosedale, Ohio, United States; 40.0776°N 83.45717°W
- Campus: Rural
- Website: rosedale.edu

Rosedale Bible College (RBC) is a private evangelical Anabaptist junior Bible college in Rosedale, Ohio. RBC offers an Associate in Biblical Studies accredited by the Commission on Accreditation of the Association for Biblical Higher Education. The college is owned by the Rosedale Network of Churches, a coalition of roughly 120 widely scattered churches within the Mennonite family of faith united by an evangelical-Anabaptist theology.

== History ==
RBC began in 1952 near the town of Berlin, Ohio, as a six-week Bible school that met in a local Mennonite church. In 1964 the college moved to its present campus and became known as Rosedale Bible Institute. The ensuing years saw growth in both course offerings and length of the school year. In conjunction with accreditation and degree granting privileges recognized by the Ohio Board of Regents, the institution changed its name in 2001 to Rosedale Bible College.

Currently the college serves approximately 70 students annually, a large majority of them coming from Mennonite congregations. The ratio of men to women is generally 50/50. The institution has roughly 7,000 alumni, with a relatively large number serving the church as missionaries, pastors, and ministry workers throughout the world. A majority of RBC students transfer to four-year institutions to further their education.

== Academics ==
Rosedale Bible College offers a transferable 2-year Associate Degree in Biblical Studies. RBC also offers an Academic Fast Track which allows students to graduate from the college and transfer to another school to complete a bachelor’s degree in two additional years. Rosedale Bible College is authorized by Ohio Higher Education (the state’s educational oversight body) to grant associate degrees.

As part of Rosedale Bible College’s core curriculum, the Explore Program requires every student to spend 20-25 hours per year in the local community, serving, learning, growing, and being challenged.

Rosedale Bible College offers transformative learning programs designed to provide students with hands-on, real-life experiences. These transformative learning programs include:

- Distance Learning Training in Ministry
- Short-term Ministry Programs
- Rosedale School of Business and Leadership
- Cross-Cultural Learning
- Venture Program
- Bridge Internships

=== Distance Learning Training in Ministry Program ===
The Distance Learning Training in Ministry is a program designed to equip students to serve in their local congregation.

=== Short-term Ministry Programs ===
The Short-term Ministry Programs is for students who’ve been part of a short-term ministry program. They may be eligible to turn those experiences into college credit at Rosedale Bible College. The REACH and YES programs operated by Mennonite missions agencies are programs that are approved by the academic committee for inclusion in this policy.

=== Rosedale School of Business and Leadership ===
The Rosedale School of Business and Leadership is a program that allows students to get an Associate Degree in Biblical Studies with a concentration in business and leadership. The program’s purpose is to prepare students to move directly into business management, or transfer to another institution to earn a Bachelor's degree in business with two more years of study.

=== Bridge internships ===
Bridge is an internship program for second or third-year students to develop vocational skills while serving in ministries and other occupational roles in their local community.

== Enrollment ==
The average school enrollment is 70 students, while typical class size is 15 – 20 students.

== Student life ==
Rosedale Bible College offers the following extracurricular activities:

- Rosedale Choir
- Rosedale Chorale
- Annual Drama Production
- Salt and Light Co.
- Intramural Sports

== Spiritual life ==
Rosedale Bible College students gather for chapel twice a week. The service format varies widely throughout the year between teaching and worship, and entire services dedicated to prayer.

Students meet with a Discipleship Group every week. The Discipleship Group consists of a series of lessons designed for students to continually grow as followers of Jesus, and to help them process their studies.
