= Monroe Township, Madison County, Ohio =

Township in Ohio, US

- Township
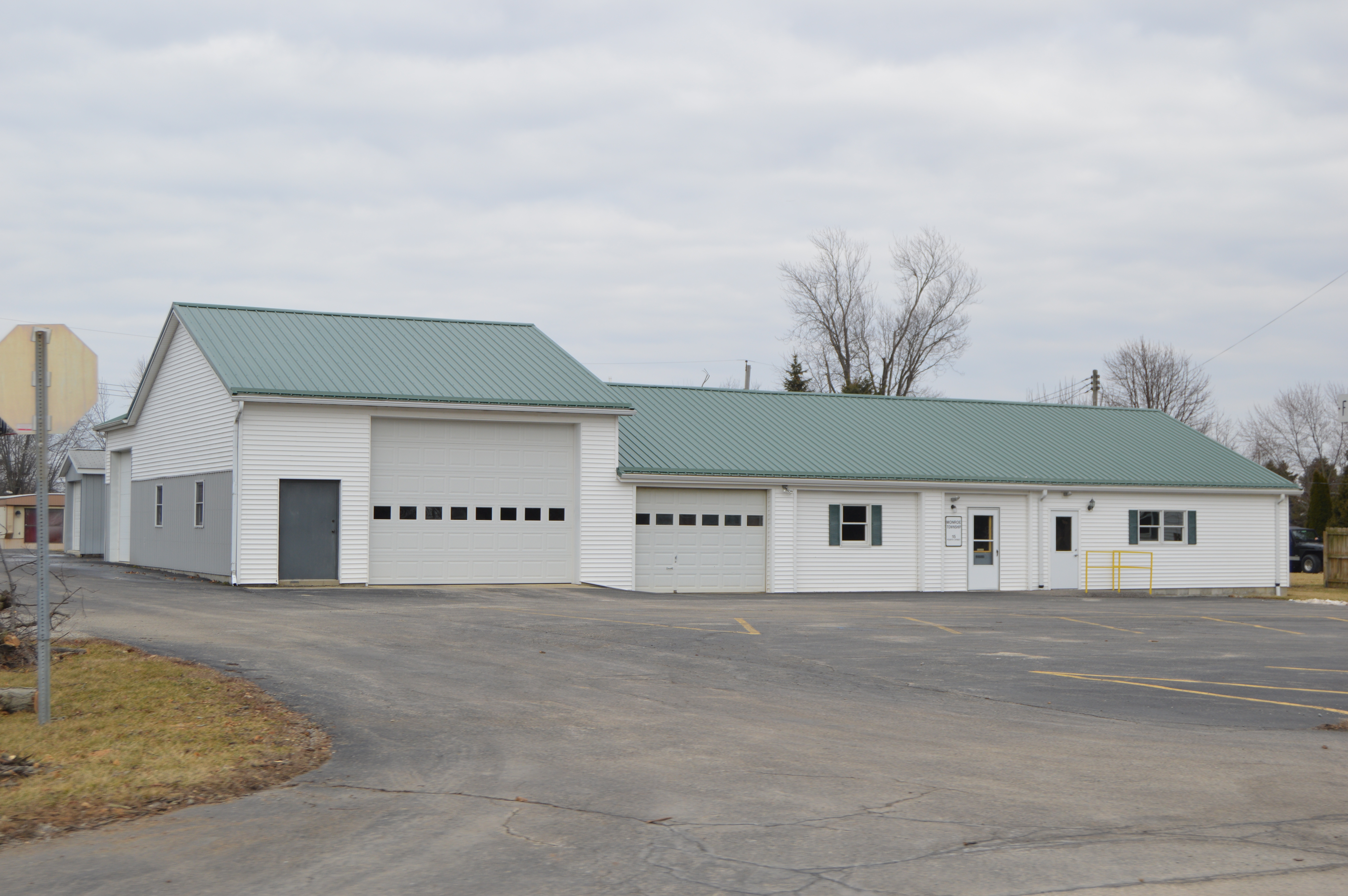
- Township hall at Plumwood

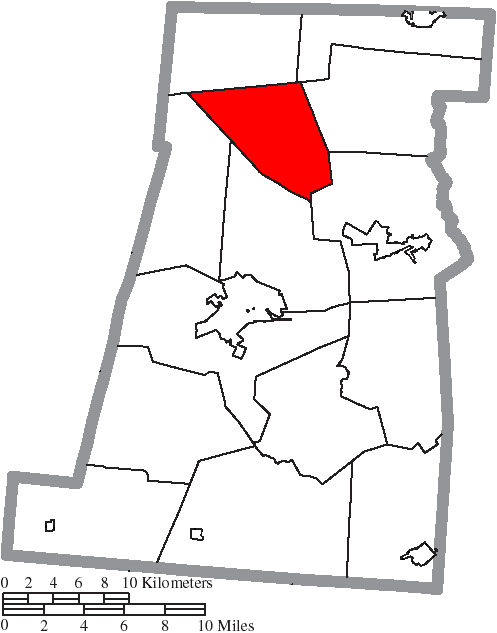
- Location of Monroe Township in Madison County
- Coordinates: 40°0′47″N 83°24′55″W
- Country: United States
- State: Ohio
- County: Madison

Area
  - Total: 22.9 sq mi (59.4 km^{2})
  - Land: 22.9 sq mi (59.4 km^{2})
  - Water: 0 sq mi (0.0 km^{2})
- Elevation: 994 ft (303 m)

Population (2020)
  - Total: 1,581
  - Density: 68.9/sq mi (26.6/km^{2})
- Time zone: UTC-5 (Eastern (EST))
  - Summer (DST): UTC-4 (EDT)
- FIPS code: 39-51478
- GNIS feature ID: 1086546

Monroe Township is one of the fourteen townships of Madison County, Ohio, United States. The 2020 census found 1,581 people in the township.

== Geography ==
Located in the northern part of the county, it borders the following townships:

- Pike Township - north
- Darby Township - northeast
- Canaan Township - east
- Jefferson Township - southeast
- Deer Creek Township - south
- Somerford Township - west

No municipalities are located in Monroe Township, although the census-designated place of Plumwood lies in the township's center.

== Name and history ==
It is one of twenty-two Monroe Townships statewide.

== Government ==
The township is governed by a three-member board of trustees, who are elected in November of odd-numbered years to a four-year term beginning on the following January 1. Two are elected in the year after the presidential election and one is elected in the year before it. There is also an elected township fiscal officer, who serves a four-year term beginning on April 1 of the year after the election, which is held in November of the year before the presidential election. Vacancies in the fiscal officership or on the board of trustees are filled by the remaining trustees.
