= Bergstresser/Dietz Covered Bridge =

Bergstresser Covered Bridge
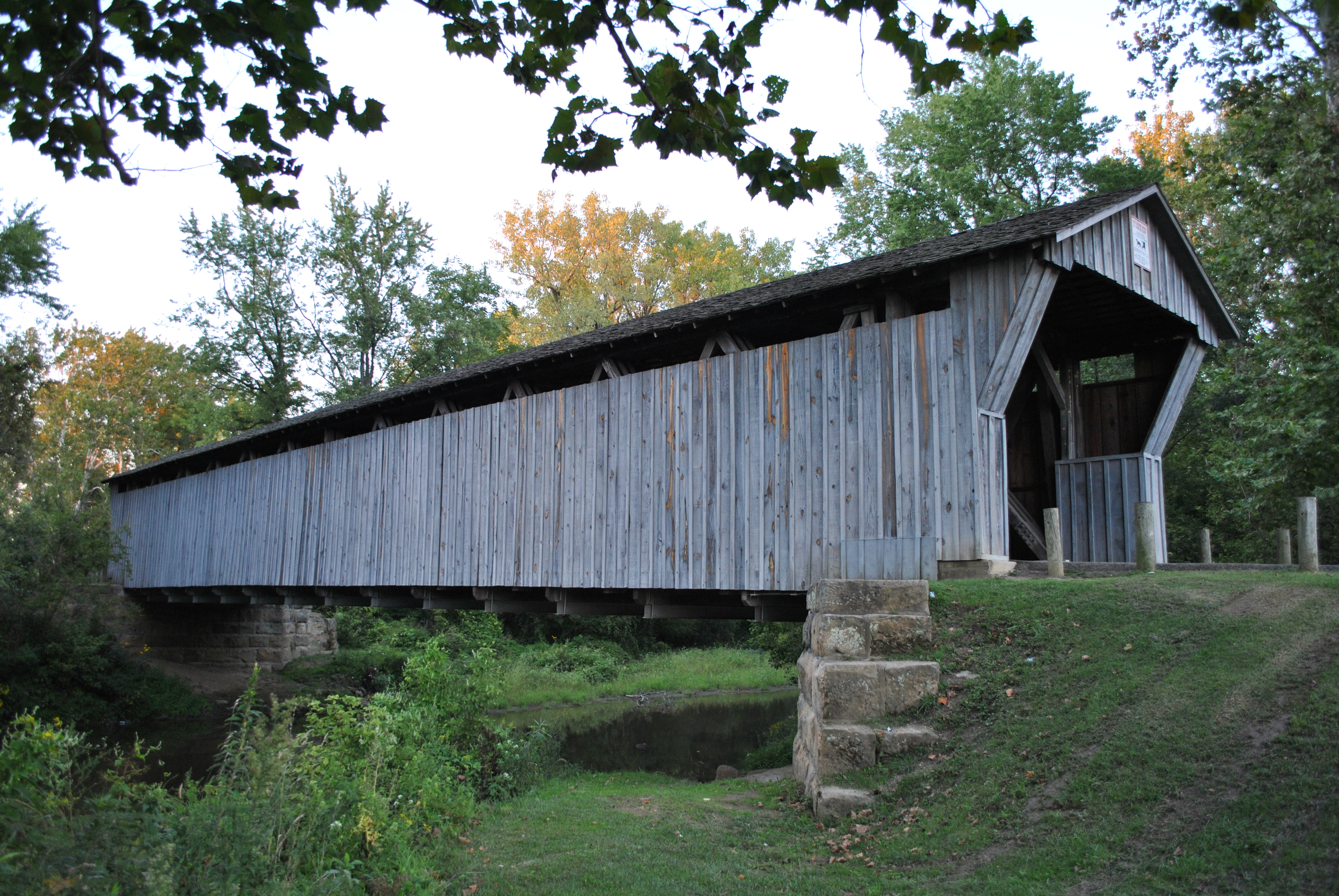
- Coordinates: 39°49′48″N 82°49′01″W
- Carries: Pedestrian
- Crosses: Little Walnut Creek
- Locale: Franklin County, Ohio

Characteristics
- Design: Partridge truss
- Total length: 134 feet (41 m)

History
- Opened: 1887
- Bergstresser Covered Bridge
- U.S. National Register of Historic Places
- Nearest city: Canal Winchester, Ohio
- Area: less than one acre
- Built: 1887
- Architect: Columbus Bridge Company; Corbett, M.
- Architectural style: Partridge truss
- NRHP reference No.: 74001484
- Added to NRHP: May 03, 1974

Location
- Interactive map of Bergstresser Covered Bridge

Bergstresser / Dietz Bridge, the last remaining covered bridge in Franklin County, Ohio, United States, is located within the city limits of Canal Winchester, Ohio in southeastern Franklin County. The wooden bridge crosses Little Walnut Creek, which is a tributary of the Scioto River. Although the bridge is in serviceable condition, it is only open to foot traffic.

== Location ==
The Bergstresser/Dietz Bridge is located adjacent to the intersection of Ashbrook Road and Washington Street in Canal Winchester. The bridge crosses Little Walnut Creek at what has been termed Kramer's Ford. An Ohio Historical Marker commemorating the bridge is located at the corner of Ashbrook Road and Washington Street.

== History ==
In the 1800s, the village of Canal Winchester was important to the local economies of southeastern Franklin and northwestern Fairfield counties. The village evolved into a local transportation hub because the Ohio and Erie Canal and the Hocking Valley Railway passed through. Little Walnut Creek acted as a moderate barrier to local farmers who transported crops into town. As a result, local citizens petitioned for a bridge to be built over Little Walnut Creek.

In March 1887, the Franklin County Commissioners announced the building of a bridge over Little Walnut Creek at Kramer's Ford. Michael Corbett of Groveport, Ohio, contracted to construct the abutments and the Columbus Bridge Company built the covered bridge for $2,690.00. Reuben Partridge, company vice president, supervised the building, using his patented truss system consisting of double and triple truss members constructed of pine and oak.

In the 1930s, the road traveling over the bridge became State Route 674, and in the 1950s the road was redirected to bypass the covered bridge.

== Preservation ==
In 1990, the county contracted with Abba Lichtenstein & Associates to evaluate the condition of the bridge. The W.J. Seidensticker Company repaired and restored the Bergstresser/Dietz Bridge using original and new materials. The bridge was rededicated on September 1, 1991. At this time, the ownership of the bridge was transferred to the village of Canal Winchester. The Ohio Historical Marker (Marker Number 17-25) was erected in 1992 by Citizens for Positive Growth for the Village of Canal Winchester and the Ohio Historical Society.
