= Reed Bridge =

- U.S. National Register of Historic Places
- Location within Ohio
- Nearest city: Marysville, Ohio
- Coordinates: 40°08′59″N 83°22′50″W
- Area: 1 acre (0.40 ha)
- Architectural style: Partridge truss
- NRHP reference No.: 75001547
- Added to NRHP: March 4, 1975

The Reed Bridge, near Marysville, Ohio, United States, was a Partridge truss covered bridge. It was listed on the National Register of Historic Places in 1975.

It was a single-span wooden bridge which spanned Big Darby Creek.

It was built by Reuben Partridge in 1884 and spanned over 150 feet (46 m). It was the longest covered bridge in Union County.

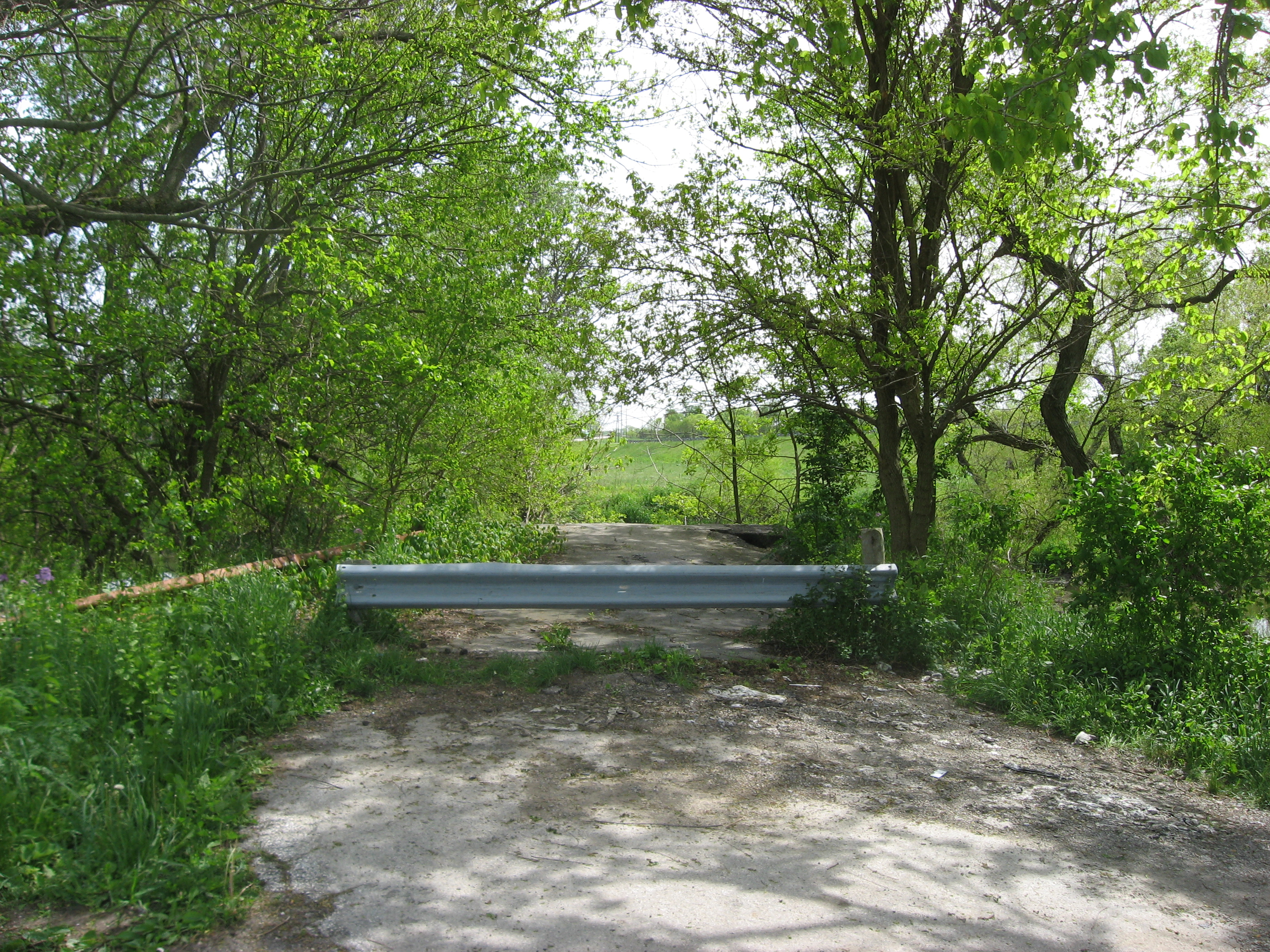
Site of former bridge

It was located 3.5 miles south of Marysville off State Route 38 in Darby Township, Union County, Ohio. It was bypassed by Route 38 in the 1960s. The bridge collapsed on August 19, 1993.
