= Canaan Township, Madison County, Ohio =

Township in Ohio, US

- Township
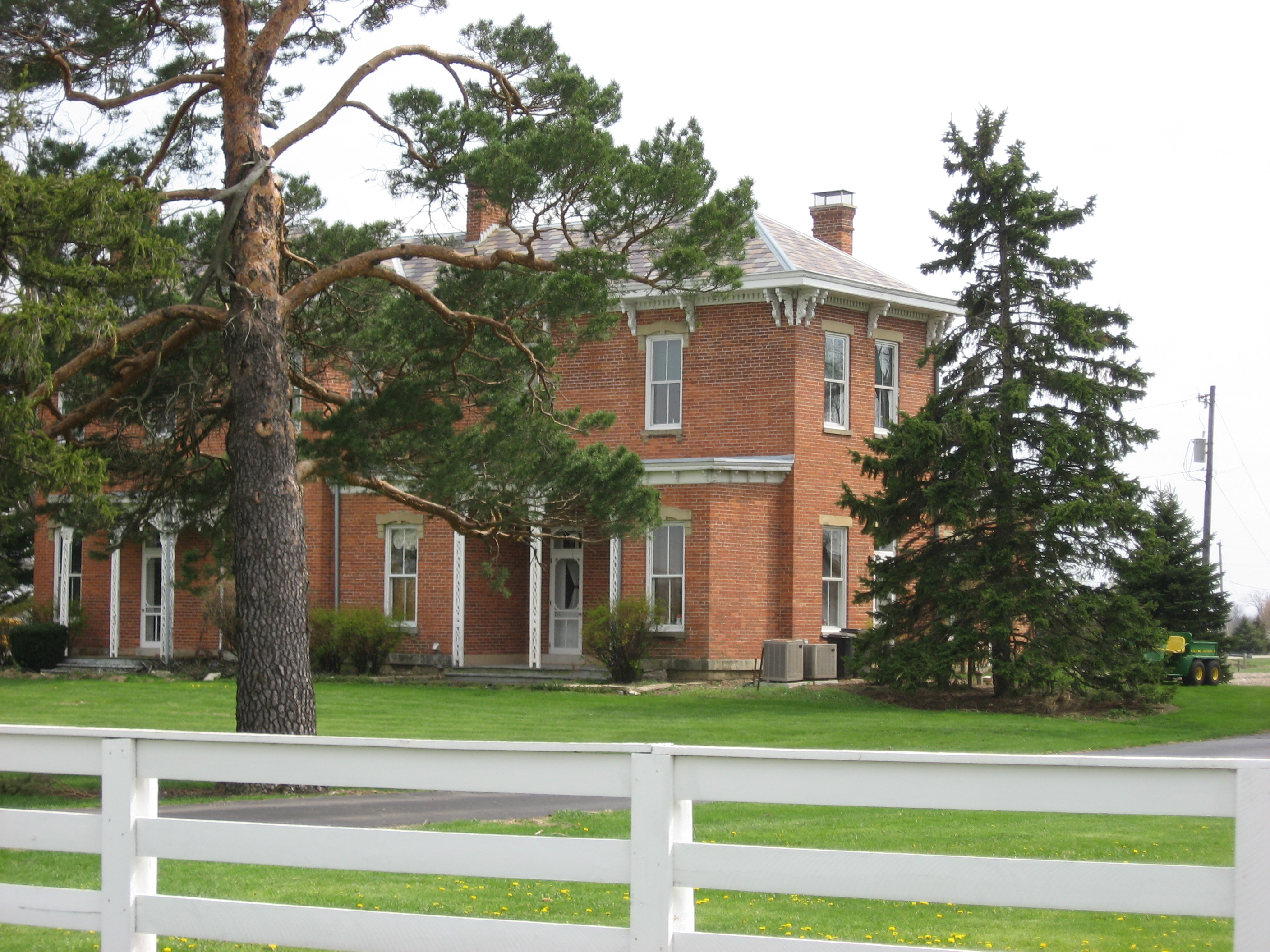
- Price Corners farmhouse on U.S. Route 42

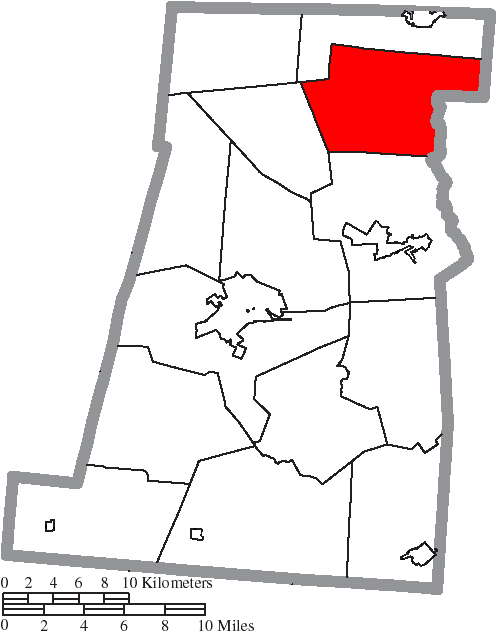
- Location of Canaan Township in Madison County
- Coordinates: 40°3′12″N 83°16′36″W
- Country: United States
- State: Ohio
- County: Madison

Area
  - Total: 35.0 sq mi (90.6 km^{2})
  - Land: 35.0 sq mi (90.6 km^{2})
  - Water: 0 sq mi (0.0 km^{2})
- Elevation: 965 ft (294 m)

Population (2020)
  - Total: 2,631
  - Density: 75.2/sq mi (29.0/km^{2})
- Time zone: UTC-5 (Eastern (EST))
  - Summer (DST): UTC-4 (EDT)
- FIPS code: 39-11234
- GNIS feature ID: 1086540

Canaan Township is one of the fourteen townships of Madison County, Ohio, United States. The 2020 census found 2,631 people in the township.

== Geography ==
Located in the northeastern part of the county, it borders the following townships:

- Darby Township - north
- Washington Township, Franklin County - northeast
- Brown Township, Franklin County - east
- Jefferson Township - south
- Monroe Township - west

No municipalities are located in Canaan Township.

== Name and history ==
As of 1854, the population of the township was 685, 842 in 1890, 881 in 1900, and 921 in 1910. Statewide, other Canaan Townships are located in Athens, Morrow, and Wayne counties.

== Government ==
The township is governed by a three-member board of trustees, who are elected in November of odd-numbered years to a four-year term beginning on the following January 1. Two are elected in the year after the presidential election and one is elected in the year before it. There is also an elected township fiscal officer, who serves a four-year term beginning on April 1 of the year after the election, which is held in November of the year before the presidential election. Vacancies in the fiscal officership or on the board of trustees are filled by the remaining trustees.
