= Conservative Mennonite Conference =

Conservative Mennonite Conference may refer to:

- Certain denominations in the Conservative Mennonite tradition of Conservative Anabaptism, such as the Conservative Mennonite Fellowship
- a former name for the Rosedale Network of Churches, an mainline Anabaptist denomination
