= Darby Township, Union County, Ohio =

Township in Ohio, US

- Township
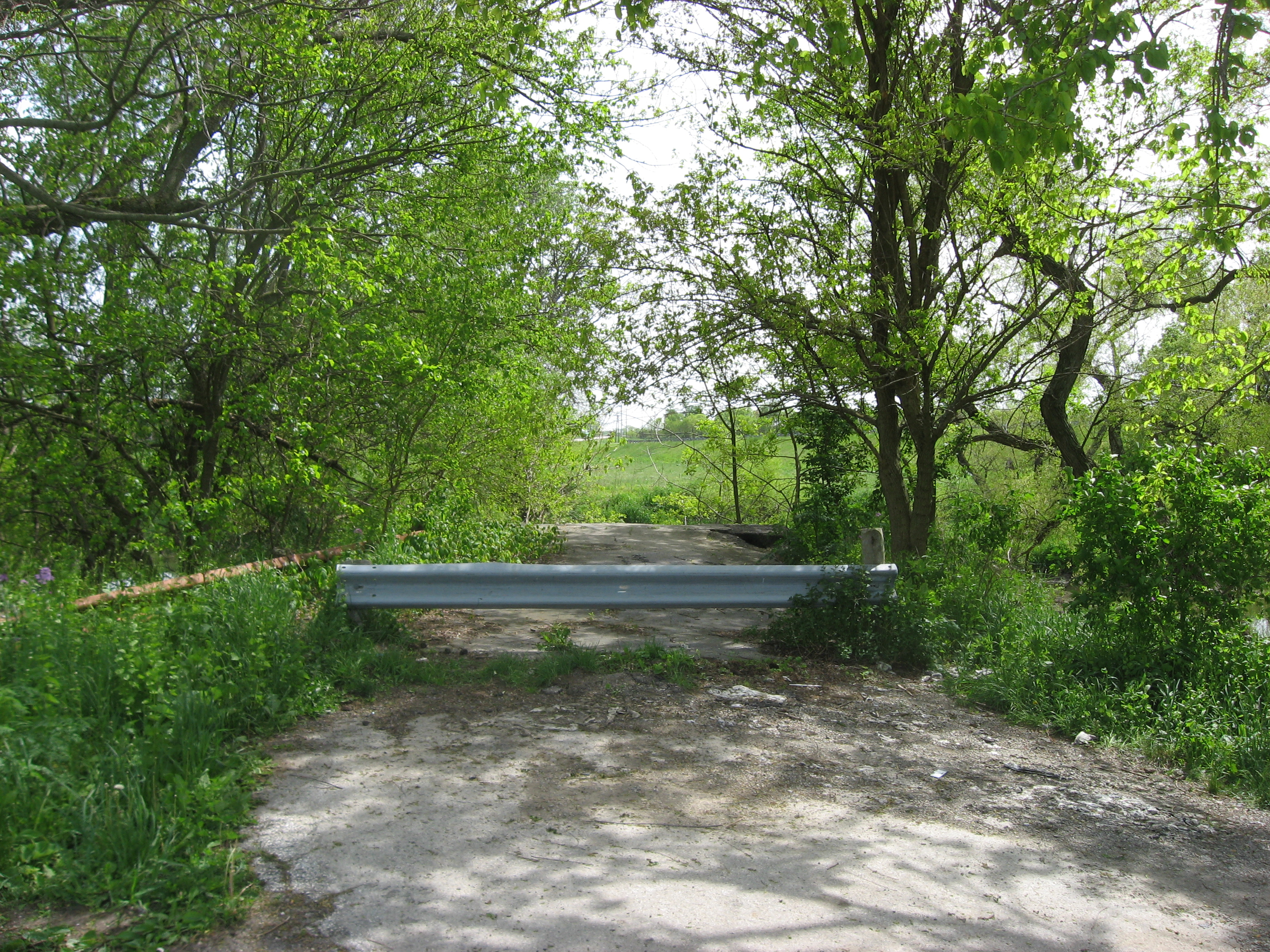
- Remains of the Reed Bridge

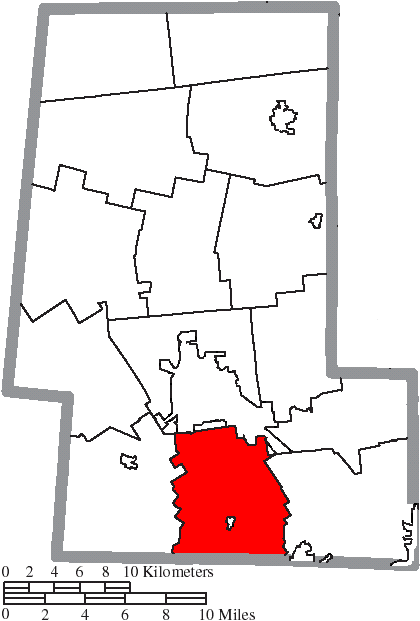
- Location of Darby Township in Union County
- Coordinates: 40°8′33″N 83°20′43″W
- Country: United States
- State: Ohio
- County: Union

Area
  - Total: 31.5 sq mi (81.7 km^{2})
  - Land: 31.5 sq mi (81.7 km^{2})
  - Water: 0 sq mi (0.0 km^{2})
- Elevation: 958 ft (292 m)

Population (2020)
  - Total: 2,397
  - Density: 76.0/sq mi (29.3/km^{2})
- Time zone: UTC-5 (Eastern (EST))
  - Summer (DST): UTC-4 (EDT)
- FIPS code: 39-20170
- GNIS feature ID: 1087075
- Website: http://www.unioncountydarbytwp.com

Darby Township is one of the fourteen townships of Union County, Ohio, United States. The 2020 census found 2,397 people in the township.

== Geography ==
Located in the southern part of the county, it borders the following townships:

- Paris Township - north
- Millcreek Township - northeast
- Jerome Township - east
- Darby Township, Madison County - south
- Pike Township, Madison County - southwest
- Union Township - west

Several populated places are located in Darby Township:

- A small part of the city of Marysville, the county seat of Union County, in the north
- The village of Unionville Center in the south
- The unincorporated community of Bridgeport, in the far west
- The unincorporated community of Chuckery, in the far southwest

== Name and history ==
Darby Township was organized in 1820, and named after the Big Darby Creek, which runs through the township. The first settlers of the township were from Pennsylvania and Virginia. Statewide, other Darby Townships are located in Madison and Pickaway counties.

== Government ==
The township is governed by a three-member board of trustees, who are elected in November of odd-numbered years to a four-year term beginning on the following January 1. Two are elected in the year after the presidential election and one is elected in the year before it. There is also an elected township fiscal officer, who serves a four-year term beginning on April 1 of the year after the election, which is held in November of the year before the presidential election. Vacancies in the fiscal officership or on the board of trustees are filled by the remaining trustees.
