= Irwin, Ohio =

- Unincorporated community
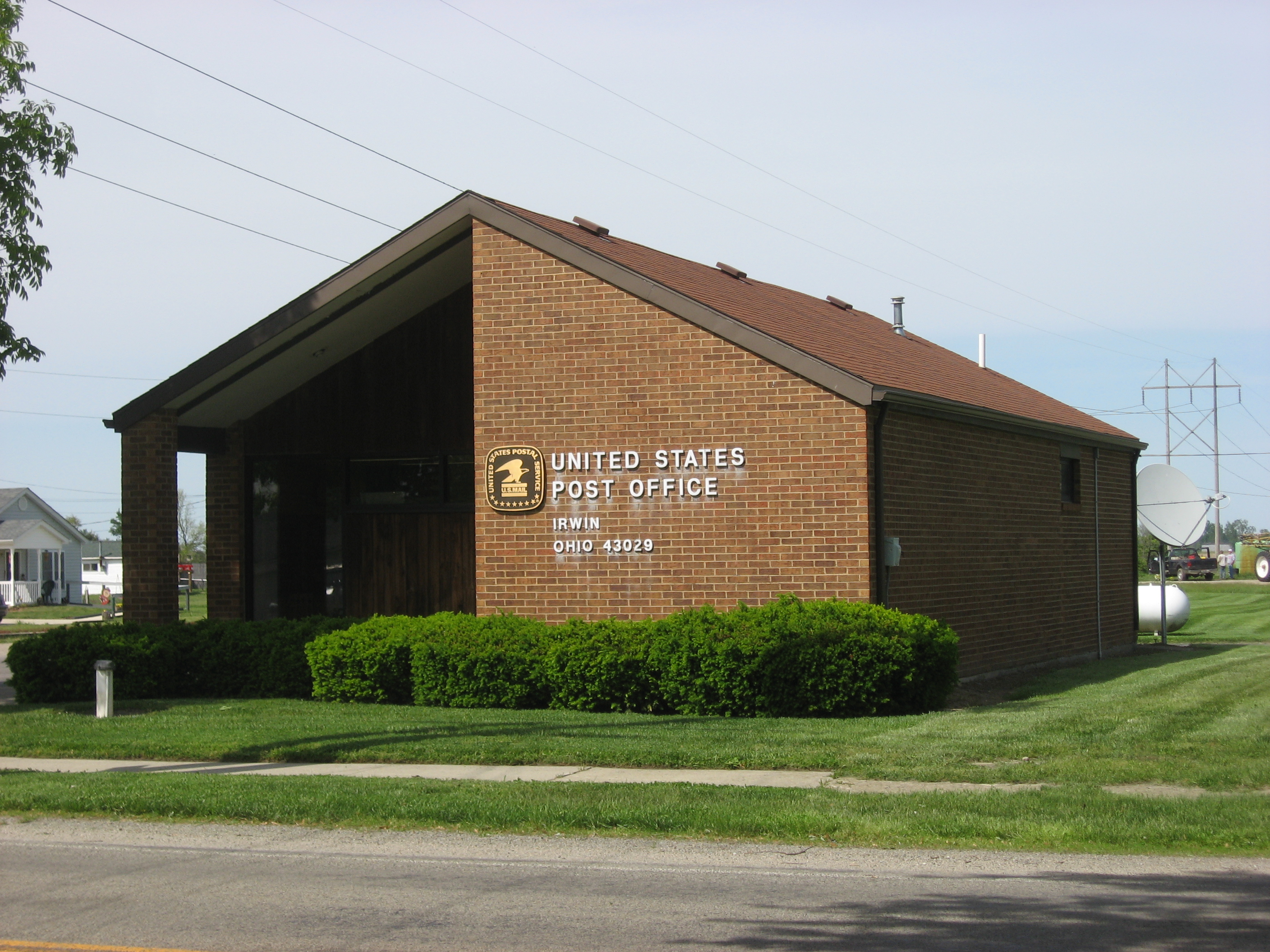
- Post office

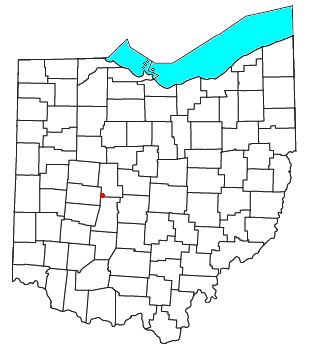
- Location of Irwin, Ohio
- Coordinates: 40°07′21″N 83°29′22″W
- Country: United States
- State: Ohio
- Counties: Union
- Elevation: 1,011 ft (308 m)
- Time zone: UTC-5 (Eastern (EST))
  - Summer (DST): UTC-4 (EDT)
- ZIP code: 43029
- Area code: 614
- GNIS feature ID: 1064891

Irwin is an unincorporated community in southwestern Union Township, Union County, Ohio, United States. It is located at the intersection of Ohio State Route 4 and 161. Irwin has a post office which serves the surrounding area, including the community of Rosedale.

== History ==
A post office has been in operation at Irwin since 15 May 1858. The community was named for one Mr. Irwin, a pioneer settler.

Located near Irwin is Elmwood Place, a historic farm that is listed on the National Register of Historic Places.
