= Ellis Mounds =

Archaeological site in Ohio, United States

- U.S. National Register of Historic Places
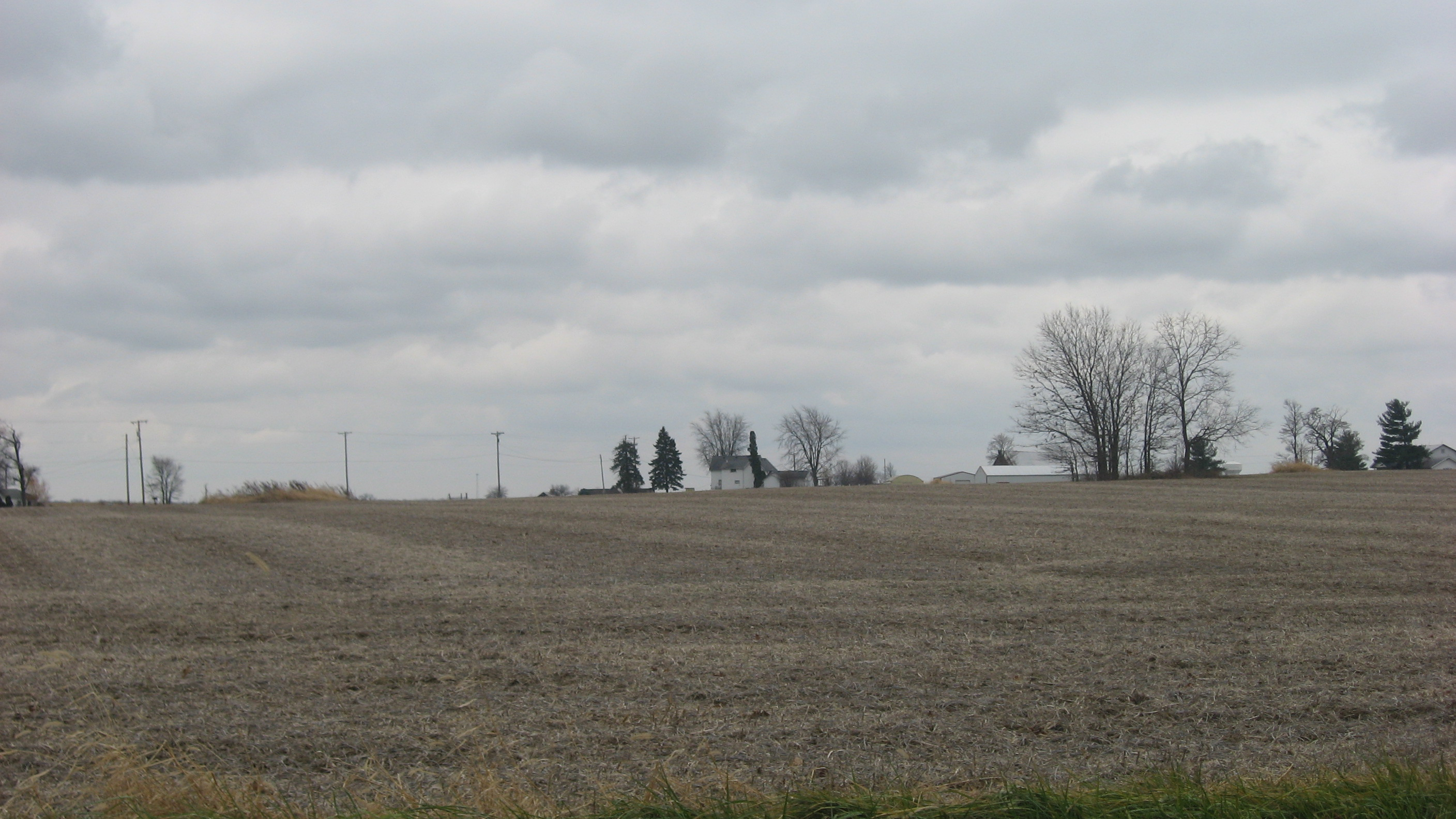
- Overview from the north

- Location within Ohio Location within the United States
- Location: Within the triangle formed by Hillview Rd., Wolford-Maskill Rd., and State Route 4
- Nearest city: Marysville, Ohio
- Coordinates: 40°17′15″N 83°20′56″W
- Area: 2 acres (0.81 ha)
- NRHP reference No.: 74001638
- Added to NRHP: July 30, 1974

The Ellis Mounds are a complex of Native American mounds near Marysville in Union County, Ohio, United States. These three mounds form an east-west line on a small ridgeline in a farm field. Believed to have been built by Hopewellian peoples, the mounds are important because they may reveal information about daily life in the Hopewell culture. Archaeologists who study the Hopewell have generally concentrated on their largest ceremonial centers: as a result, while the mortuary customs of the Hopewell are well known, other aspects of their culture are little understood. For this reason, a site such as Ellis that bears the potential of yielding information about such aspects is valuable indeed, especially because its date has not yet been established: Ellis may have been built as early as 300 BC and as late as AD 600. Furthermore, the location of the mounds outside of the Hopewellian heartland farther south may demonstrate the spread of Hopewell influence, since excavations in numerous locations have demonstrated the necessity of assembling a complex society with many workers in order to construct the ceremonial mounds for which the Hopewell are well known.

In 1974, the archaeological significance of the Ellis Mounds was recognized when they were listed on the National Register of Historic Places. They are one of seven National Register sites in Union County and the only one in the county's northern regions: three of the other six are within Marysville's city limits; the other three are south and west of Marysville.
