= Milford Center, Ohio =

- Village
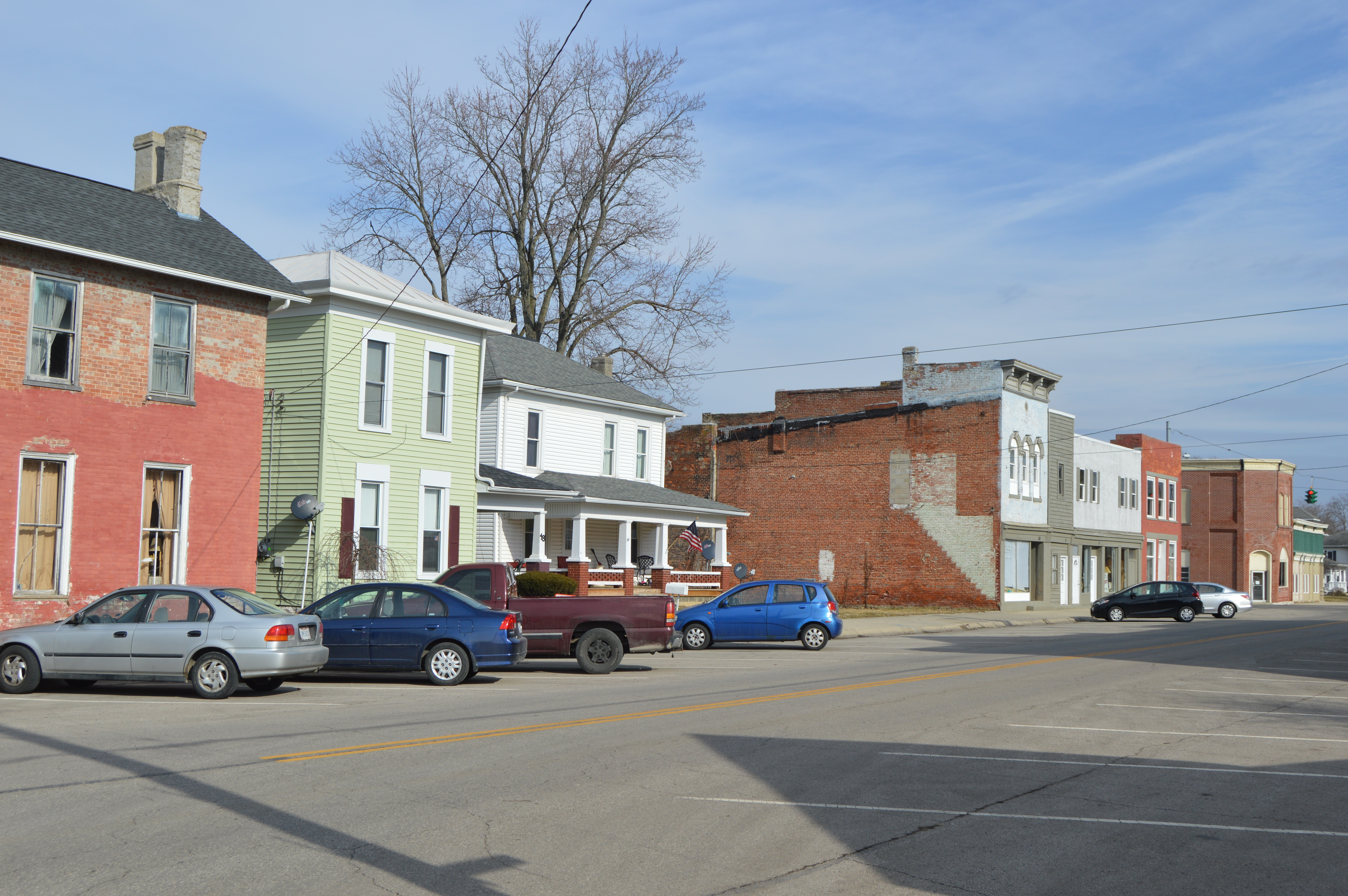
- State Street downtown

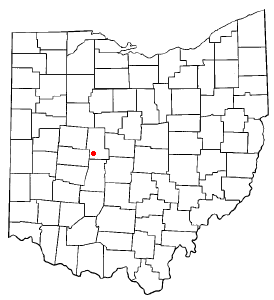
- Location of Milford Center, Ohio

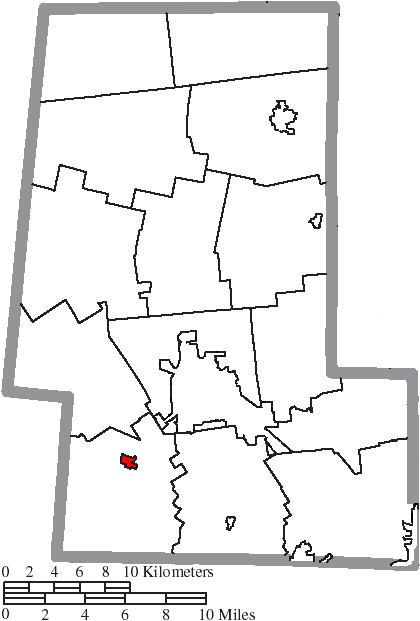
- Location of Milford Center in Union County
- Coordinates: 40°10′43″N 83°26′9″W
- Country: United States
- State: Ohio
- County: Union
- Township: Union

Area
  - Total: 0.43 sq mi (1.12 km^{2})
  - Land: 0.42 sq mi (1.09 km^{2})
  - Water: 0.012 sq mi (0.03 km^{2})
- Elevation: 994 ft (303 m)

Population (2020)
  - Total: 807
  - Density: 1,914.0/sq mi (738.99/km^{2})
- Time zone: UTC-5 (Eastern (EST))
  - Summer (DST): UTC-4 (EDT)
- ZIP code: 43045
- Area codes: 937, 326
- FIPS code: 39-50218
- GNIS feature ID: 2399346
- Website: https://www.villageofmilfordcenter.com/

Milford Center is a village in Union County, Ohio, United States. The population was 807 at the 2020 census.

== History ==
Milford Center was originally called Milford, and under the latter name was platted in 1816. The village was incorporated in 1853. A post office was established as Milford in 1823; the name was changed to Milford Centre in 1829, and was finally changed again to Milford Center in 1893.

== Geography ==
According to the United States Census Bureau, the village has a total area of 0.42 square miles (1.09 km^{2}), of which 0.41 square miles (1.06 km^{2}) is land and 0.01 square miles (0.03 km^{2}) is water.

== Demographics ==
Historical population
Census	Pop.	Note	%±
1850	211		—
1870	372		—
1880	490		31.7%
1890	718		46.5%
1900	682		−5.0%
1910	685		0.4%
1920	671		−2.0%
1930	647		−3.6%
1940	686		6.0%
1950	753		9.8%
1960	794		5.4%
1970	753		−5.2%
1980	764		1.5%
1990	651		−14.8%
2000	626		−3.8%
2010	792		26.5%
2020	807		1.9%
U.S. Decennial Census

=== 2010 census ===
As of the census of 2010, there were 792 people, 299 households, and 220 families living in the village. The population density was 1,931.7 inhabitants per square mile (745.8/km^{2}). There were 324 housing units at an average density of 790.2 per square mile (305.1/km^{2}). The racial makeup of the village was 96.8% White, 0.5% African American, 0.4% Native American, 0.3% Asian, and 2.0% from two or more races. Hispanic or Latino of any race were 0.6% of the population.

There were 299 households, of which 37.5% had children under the age of 18 living with them, 52.8% were married couples living together, 14.7% had a female householder with no husband present, 6.0% had a male householder with no wife present, and 26.4% were non-families. 21.7% of all households were made up of individuals, and 10% had someone living alone who was 65 years of age or older. The average household size was 2.65 and the average family size was 3.03.

The median age in the village was 34.9 years. 28% of residents were under the age of 18; 7.8% were between the ages of 18 and 24; 29.4% were from 25 to 44; 24.2% were from 45 to 64; and 10.6% were 65 years of age or older. The gender makeup of the village was 47.0% male and 53.0% female.

=== 2000 census ===
As of the census of 2000, there were 626 people, 232 households, and 177 families living in the village. The population density was 1,770.8 inhabitants per square mile (683.7/km^{2}). There were 241 housing units at an average density of 681.7 per square mile (263.2/km^{2}). The racial makeup of the village was 98.88% White, and 1.12% from two or more races. Hispanic or Latino of any race were 0.64% of the population.

There were 232 households, out of which 40.9% had children under the age of 18 living with them, 60.8% were married couples living together, 12.9% had a female householder with no husband present, and 23.7% were non-families. 19.4% of all households were made up of individuals, and 8.6% had someone living alone who was 65 years of age or older. The average household size was 2.70 and the average family size was 3.11.

In the village, the population was spread out, with 28.3% under the age of 18, 8.3% from 18 to 24, 31.9% from 25 to 44, 20.8% from 45 to 64, and 10.7% who were 65 years of age or older. The median age was 34 years. For every 100 females there were 98.7 males. For every 100 females age 18 and over, there were 95.2 males.

The median income for a household in the village was $40,938, and the median income for a family was $47,250. Males had a median income of $33,929 versus $24,750 for females. The per capita income for the village was $18,346. About 1.8% of families and 1.0% of the population were below the poverty line, including none of those under age 18 and 5.5% of those age 65 or over.

== Education ==
The school district is Fairbanks Local School District.

== Notable person ==
- Norton P. Chipman - American Civil War army officer, military prosecutor, politician, author and judge
