= Elmwood Place (Irwin, Ohio) =

Historic house in Ohio, United States

- U.S. National Register of Historic Places
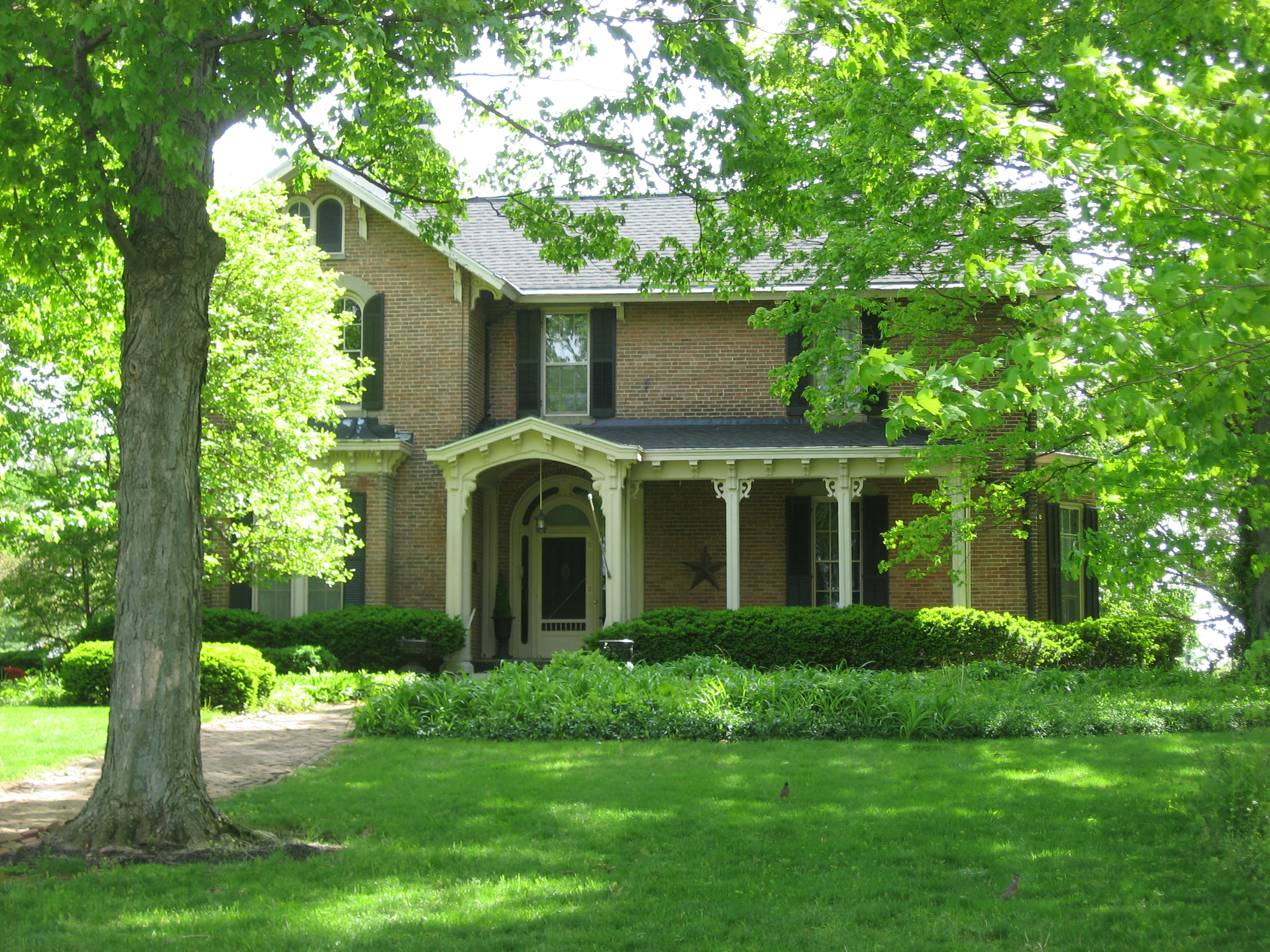
- Front of the farmhouse at Elmwood Place

- Location within Ohio Location within the United States
- Nearest city: Irwin, Ohio
- Coordinates: 40°7′9″N 83°29′3″W
- Area: 9 acres (3.6 ha)
- Built: 1861
- Architect: James Fullington
- Architectural style: Italianate
- NRHP reference No.: 79001972
- Added to NRHP: November 29, 1979

Elmwood Place is a historic farmstead in the southwestern corner of Union County, Ohio, United States. Located along State Route 161 near the community of Irwin, the farmstead comprises six different buildings spread out over an area of 9 acres (3.6 ha).

In 1858, the property where Elmwood Place sits — then open fields — was purchased by James Fullington. One of Union County's most prominent landholders, Fullington soon began construction of the present farm buildings. First to be completed was the farmhouse, finished in 1861; a carriage house and a large barn were completed, and the remaining buildings — two small frame sheds and a cottage for tenants, which was moved from its original location — were all erected by 1877.

The farmhouse at Elmwood Place is a large brick building with a porch. It was constructed with many Italianate details, such as the cornices, the arched windows and doors, and many interior elements. Because both the house and the other buildings remain in a fine state of preservation, Elmwood Place has been named one of Union County's best examples of 19th-century rural architecture. In recognition of its status, the farm was added to the National Register of Historic Places in late 1979; it is one of seven places in the county to have been recognized.
