= Big Darby Creek =

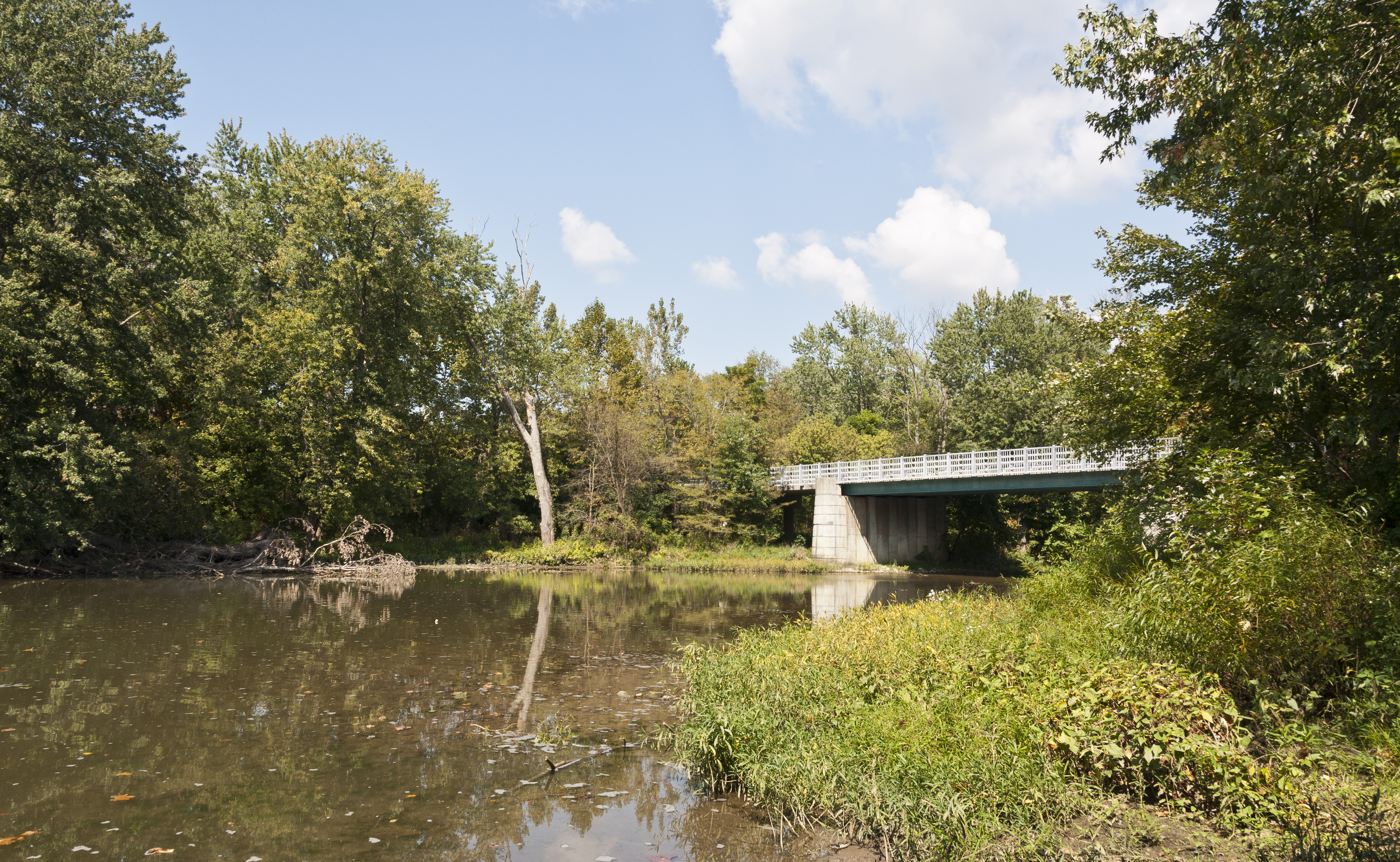

Physical characteristics
- Mouth
  - location: Scioto River, Columbus, Ohio
- Length: 84 mi (135 km)
- Basin size: 556.6 sq mi (1,442 km^{2})
- Discharge
  - location: Darbydale
  - average: 498 cu ft/s (14.1 m^{3}/s), USGS water years 1922-2019

Basin features
- River system: Lower Scioto River Basin

National Wild and Scenic Rivers System
- Type: Scenic
- Designated: March 10, 1994

Big Darby Creek is a scenic river located in northwestern central Ohio, and an important tributary to the Lower Scioto River. The river's major tributary is the Little Darby Creek.

The river runs 84 miles (135 km) from its source near the Champaign-Union county line, south-east through Union and Madison Counties. In Franklin County, the river runs through the 7,060 acres (2,860 ha) Battelle Darby Creek Metro Park, where it meets with the Little Darby Creek. Directly downstream from the park, the river empties into the Scioto River in Pickaway County at 39°36′50″N 82°57′47″W.

Big Darby Creek is one of the most biologically diverse aquatic systems in the Midwestern United States. It is the site of the only known population of the Scioto madtom, a fish which is now thought to be extinct. In addition, for its size, the creek "has the greatest diversity of freshwater mussels in North America. Forty species have been reported from the system." During creek bird surveys from 1989-1991, Zoologist Dan Rice identified 86 species of riparian corridor bird species adjacent to Big Darby Creek Scenic River. Between 1984 and 1992, Rice conducted fish surveys and found 72 species of fish in Big Darby Creek.

== History ==
When The Columbus Dispatch published an article in 1967 revealing the City of Columbus' plans to purchase over 4,000 acres (16 km^{2}) along the river to build a reservoir, a political and legal battle ensued between the municipality and several environmental groups working with the Ohio Department of Natural Resources. From 1974 to 1984, both sides exchanged victories and the legal battle continued into the Ohio Supreme Court, who ended the battle by ruling that the 'scenic river' designation was constitutional. On June 22, 1984, the Upper and Lower Darby Creeks were designated a state scenic river, and then added to the National Wild and Scenic Rivers System on March 10, 1994. In 2003, Big Darby and Little Darby Creeks were also given their own Historical Markers.

In 2008, the Columbus Zoo and Aquarium built a new exhibit focusing on the Big Darby Creek and its more than 38 rare species of fish and mussels, and in 2009, the City of Columbus, Franklin County Metro Parks, the Ohio Nature Conservancy and other companies spent more than $6 million on seven projects designed to restore sections of the river and its tributaries.

The highest recorded flood crest was 17.94 feet (5.47 m) on January 22, 1959.

== Gallery ==
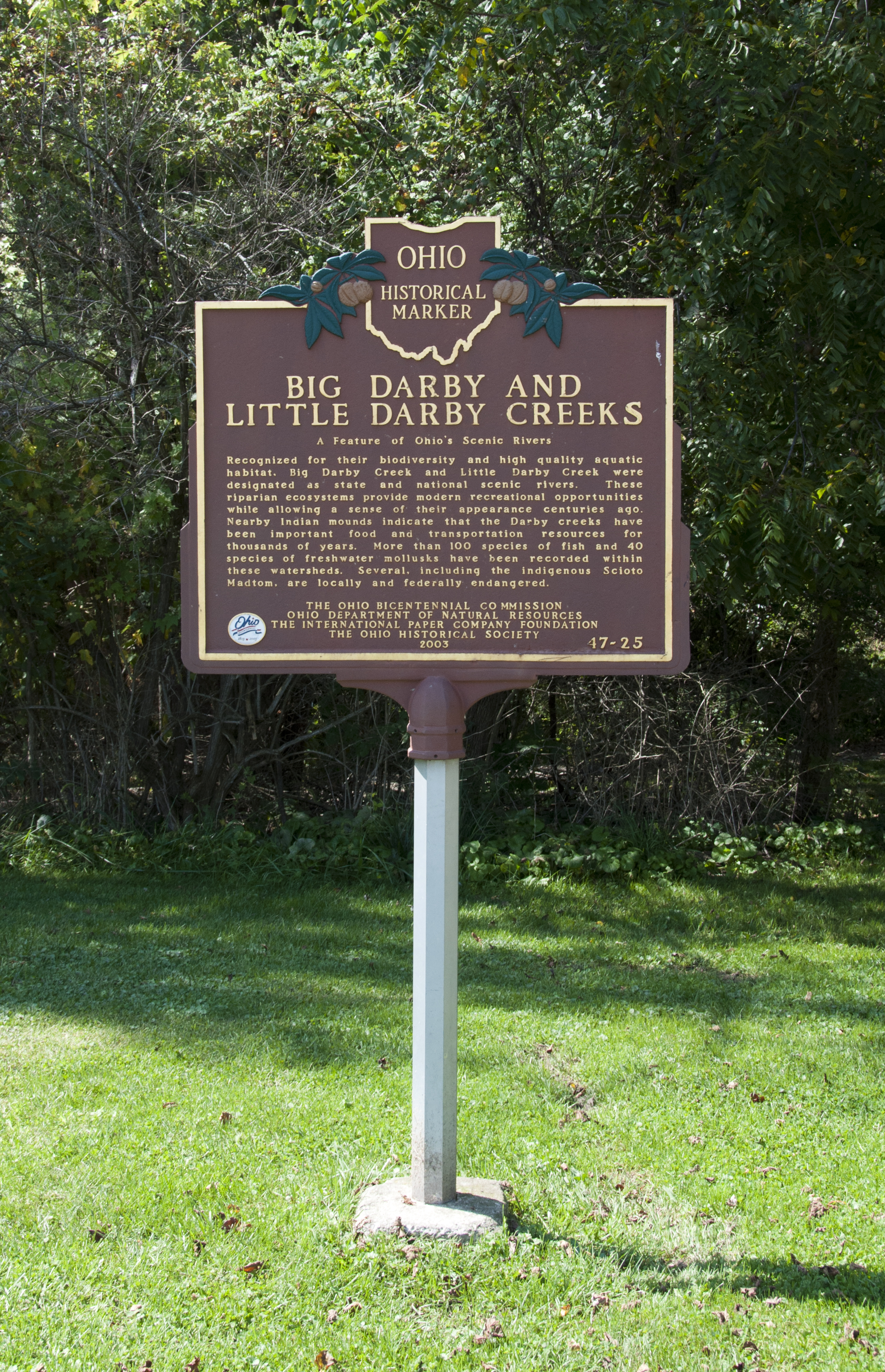
Historical Marker in Galloway

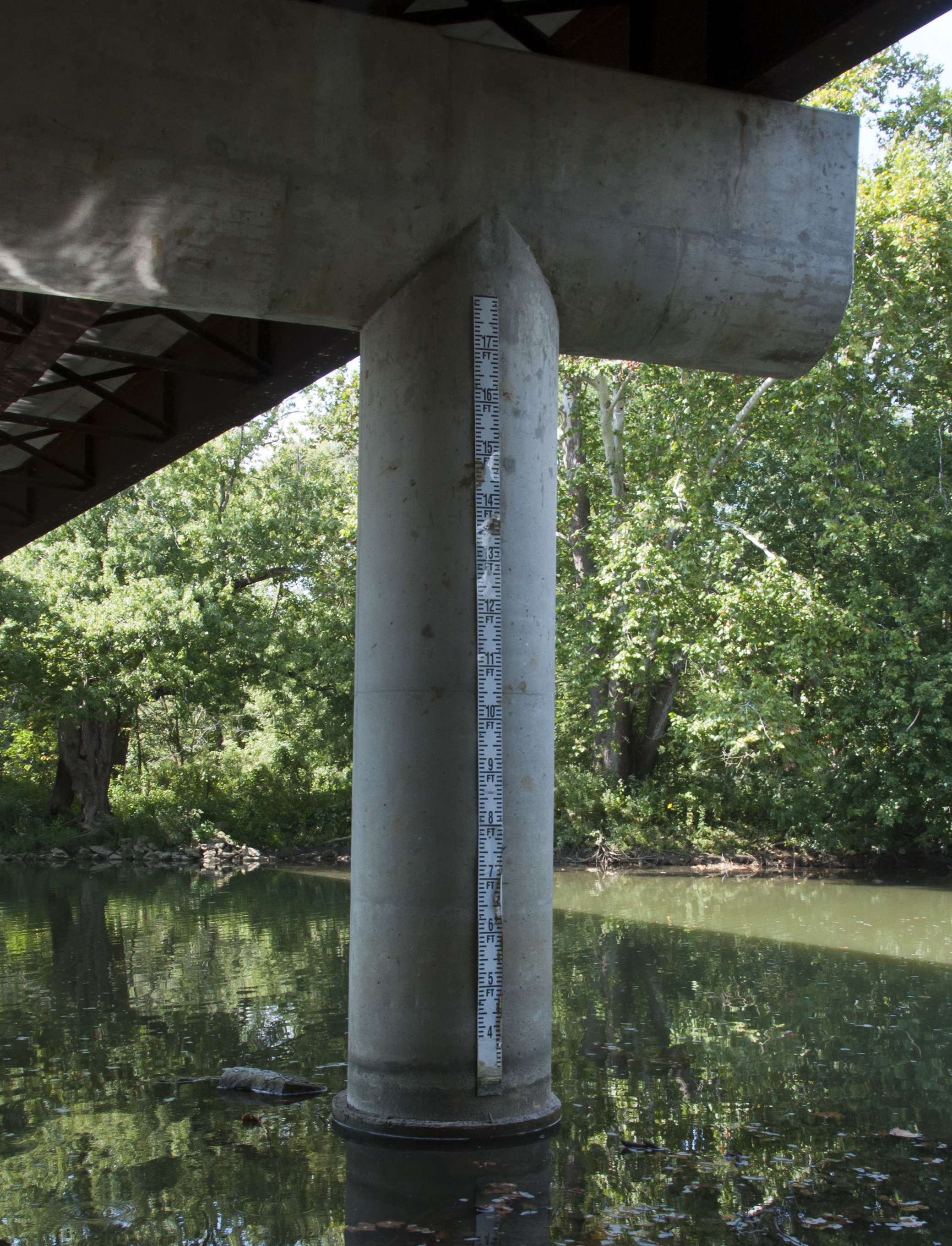
Flood Gauge in Pickaway County

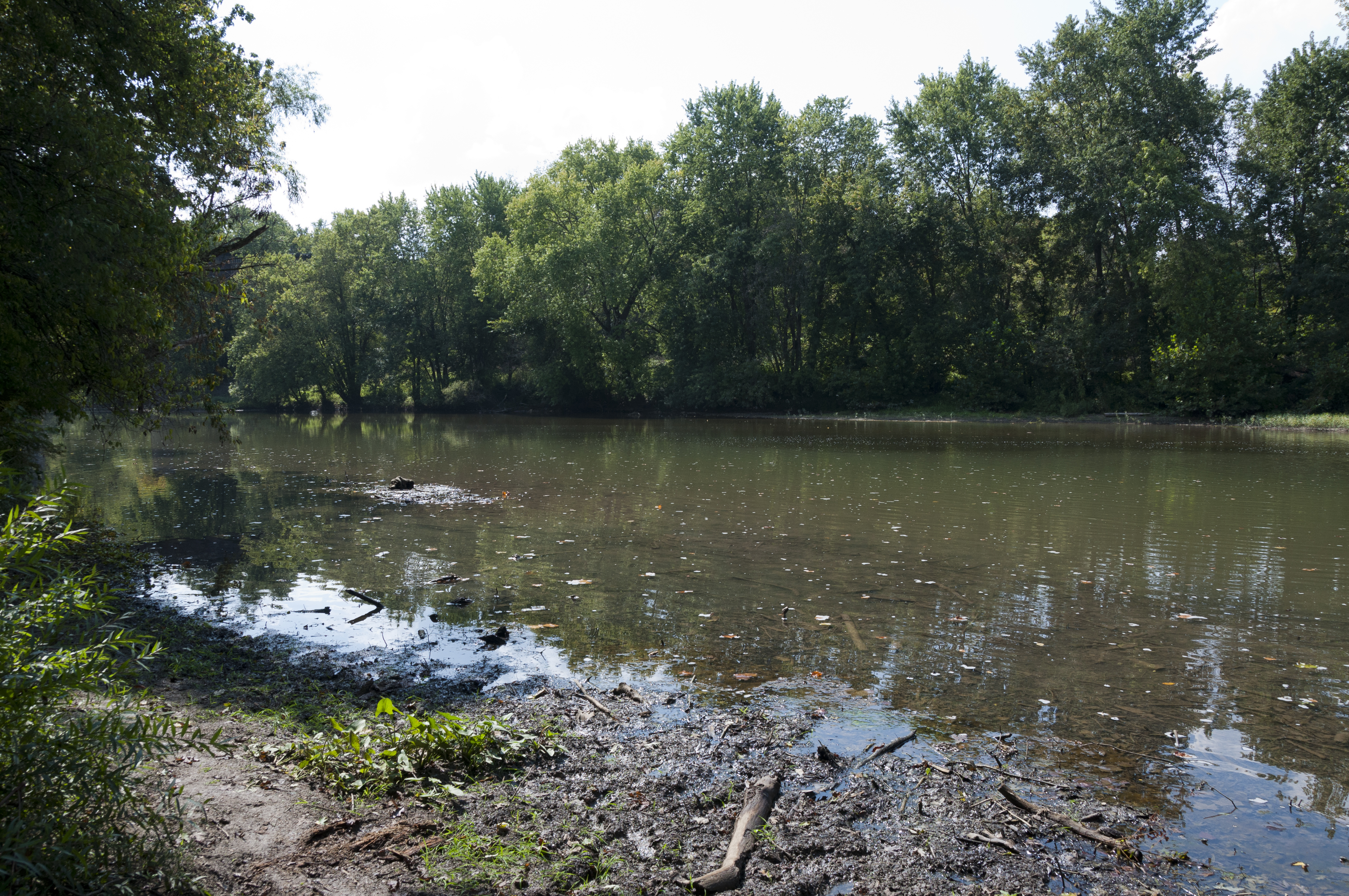
Big Darby Creek downstream from meeting Little Darby creek

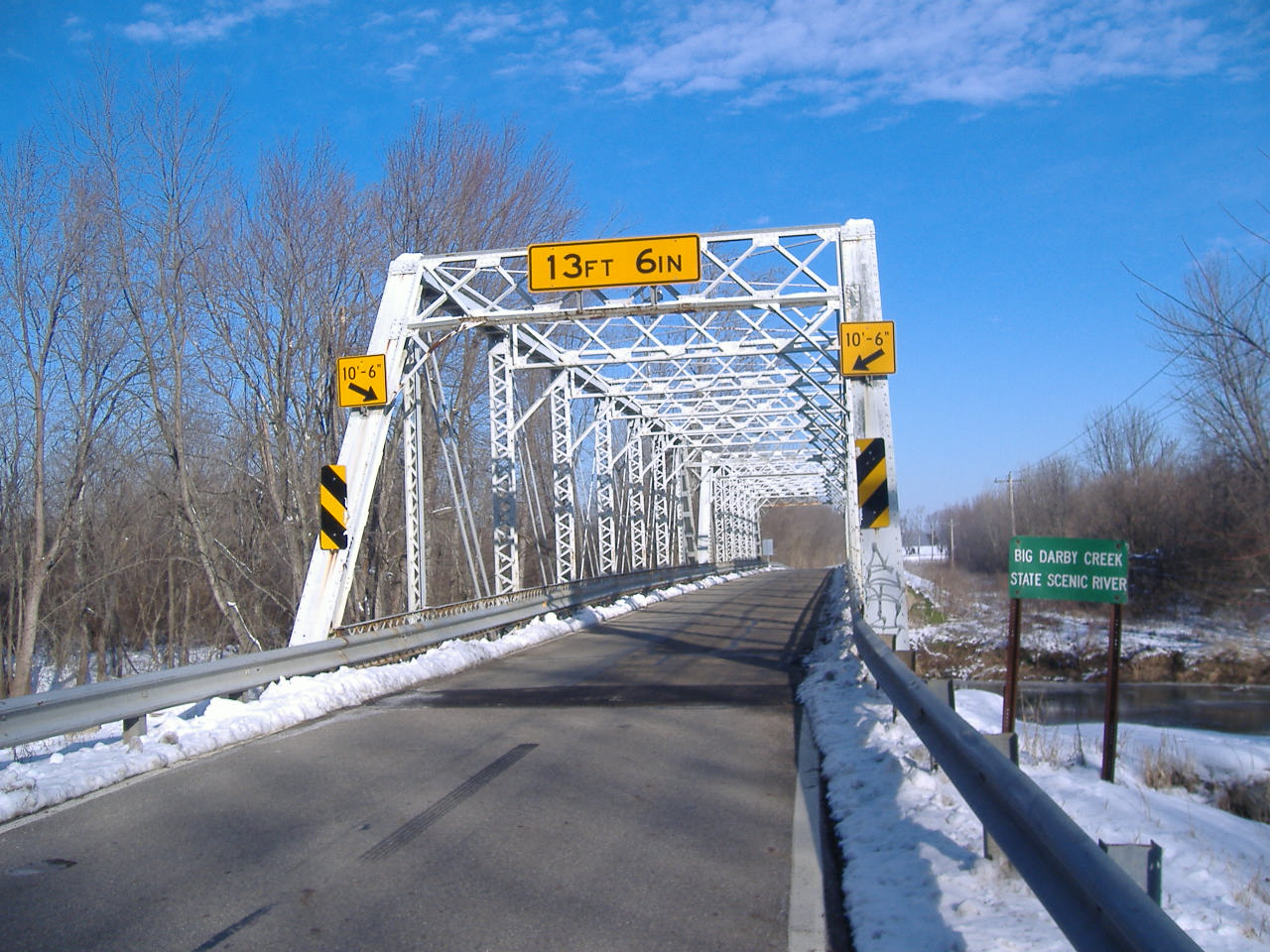
Bridge crossing Big Darby Creek located on Scioto-Darby Road in Pickaway County

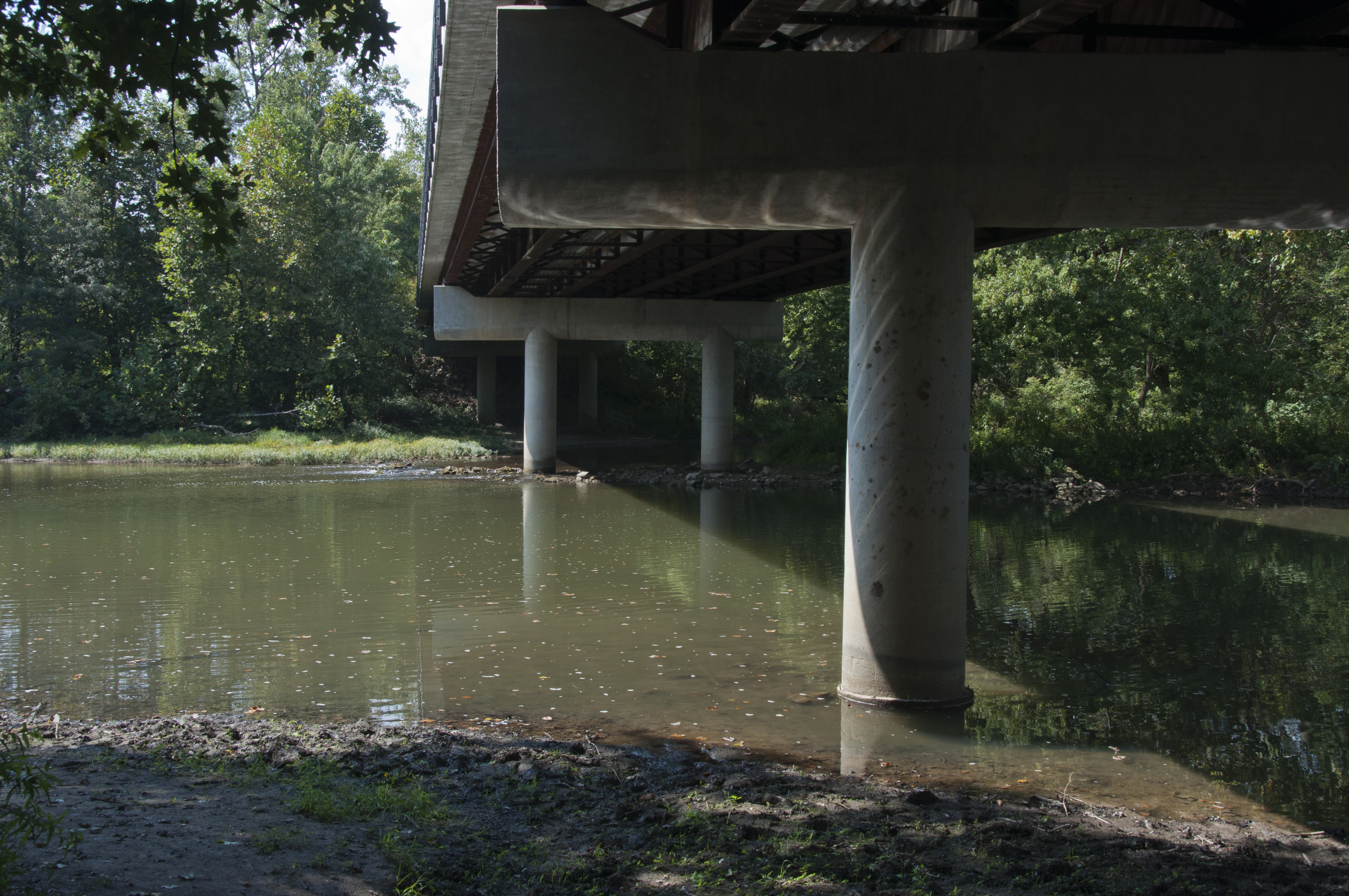
Confluence of the Big (front) and Little (rear) Darby creeks

== See also ==
- List of National Wild and Scenic Rivers
- List of rivers of Ohio
