= Little Darby Creek (Ohio) =

Little Darby Creek: Darby Creek; Derby Creek; Little Derby Creek
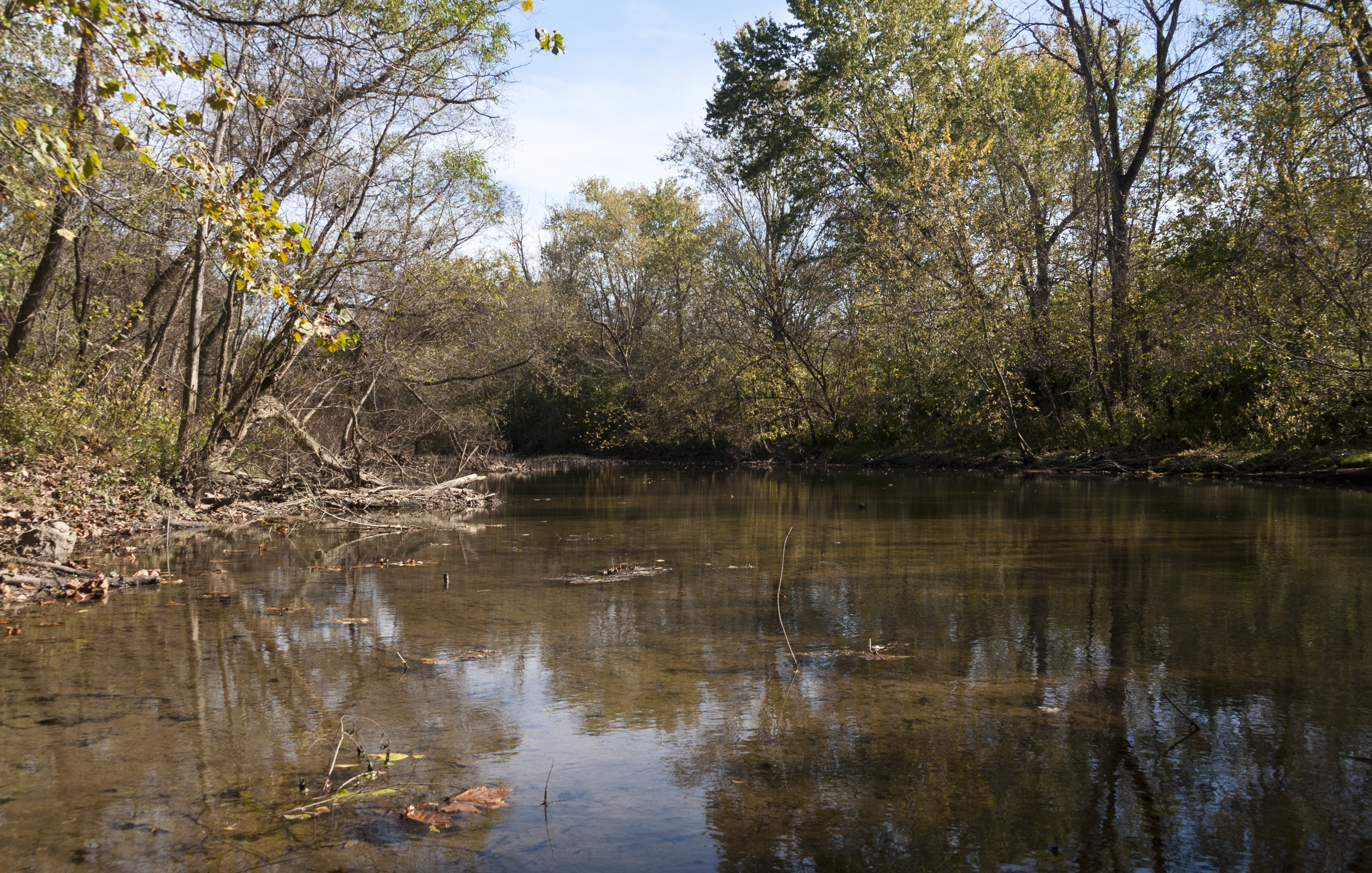

Location
- Country: United States
- Region: Central Ohio

Physical characteristics
- Source
  - coordinates: 40°06′06″N 83°36′10″W
- Mouth
  - location: Big Darby Creek
  - coordinates: 39°53′37″N 83°13′05″W
  - elevation: 827 ft (252 m)
- Discharge
  - location: West Jefferson
  - average: 187.6 cu ft/s (5.31 m^{3}/s), USGS water years 1993-2019

National Wild and Scenic Rivers System
- Type: Scenic
- Designated: March 10, 1994

The Little Darby Creek is a tributary to the Darby Creek System in central Ohio. The creeks are part of the Scioto River drainage basin. Little Darby Creek runs from an area near the Lafayette-Plain City Road Bridge downstream to the confluence with Big Darby Creek near the Darby Creek Metro Park. The village of Georgesville, Ohio, forms the western edge of the Confluence.

The Little Darby and Big Darby were listed as a state Scenic River in 1984. The creeks were listed as national Scenic Rivers in 1994.

Little Darby Creek for many years appeared to be bigger than Big Darby Creek at their confluence. This was due to a concrete fill dam across the path of the Little Darby Creek just north of the confluence. It was locally known as Oakie's dam. The Franklin County Metro Park System later removed this structure, and the stream course has returned to a near-natural condition.

== See also ==
- List of rivers of Ohio
