= National Register of Historic Places listings in Madison County, Ohio =

Location of Madison County in Ohio

This is a list of the National Register of Historic Places listings in Madison County, Ohio.

This is intended to be a complete list of the properties and districts on the National Register of Historic Places in Madison County, Ohio, United States. The locations of National Register properties and districts for which the latitude and longitude coordinates are included below, may be seen in a Google map.

There are 11 properties and districts listed on the National Register in the county.

This National Park Service list is complete through NPS recent listings posted May 1, 2026.

== Current listings ==
	Name on the Register	Image	Date listed	Location	City or town	Description
1	Cary Village Site	Cary Village Site	May 13, 1975 (#75001479)	Amid fields around the Cary Ditch, southeast of Plain City; 40°04′49″N 83°14′46″W	Darby Township	
2	Farmers National Bank	Farmers National Bank	March 9, 1995 (#95000168)	Southwestern corner of the junction of Main and Chillicothe Sts. 40°06′27″N 83°16′03″W	Plain City	
3	First United Methodist Church	First United Methodist Church	August 22, 1996 (#96000930)	52 N. Main St. 39°53′14″N 83°26′59″W	London	
4	London Commercial Business Historic District	London Commercial Business Historic District	December 17, 1985 (#85003212)	Roughly bounded by Adams, Superior and Clair Sts., Madison Ave., and Huron St. 39°53′05″N 83°26′49″W	London	
5	Madison County Courthouse	Madison County Courthouse	March 14, 1973 (#73001504)	Public Sq. 39°53′12″N 83°26′57″W	London	
6	Mount Sterling Historic District	Mount Sterling Historic District	October 1, 1974 (#74001559)	Both sides of London St. 39°43′12″N 83°15′54″W	Mount Sterling	
7	Price Corners	Price Corners	April 20, 1995 (#95000496)	7040 U.S. Route 42 S., south of Plain City; 40°02′42″N 83°17′54″W	Canaan Township	
8	Red Brick Tavern	Red Brick Tavern	September 5, 1975 (#75001478)	1700 Cumberland Rd. in Lafayette; 39°56′16″N 83°24′24″W	Deer Creek Township	
9	Skunk Hill Mounds	Skunk Hill Mounds	July 30, 1974 (#74001560)	On a ridge above the west bank of Little Darby Creek; 39°55′53″N 83°16′00″W	Jefferson Township	Near West Jefferson
10	Swetland House	Swetland House	January 11, 1983 (#83002007)	147 E. High St. 39°53′21″N 83°26′39″W	London	
11	Valentine Wilson House	Valentine Wilson House	May 22, 1973 (#73001505)	About 1 mile north of Summerford off Interstate 70; 39°56′35″N 83°30′21″W	Somerford Township	Destroyed

== See also ==
- List of National Historic Landmarks in Ohio
- Listings in neighboring counties: Champaign, Clark, Fayette, Franklin, Greene, Pickaway, Union
- National Register of Historic Places listings in Ohio
