= Swetland =

Swetland may refer to:

- Jeriah Swetland (1817–?), American businessman and local politician in Ohio
- Swetland Publishing Company, founded in 1904 by Horace Monroe Swetland
- Swetland Building, in Portland, Oregon, listed on the National Register of Historic Places
- Swetland Homestead, Wyoming, Pennsylvania, listed on the National Register of Historic Places
- Swetland House, London, Ohio, listed on the National Register of Historic Places
- Swetland-Pease House, historic house at East Longmeadow, Massachusetts
