= Interstate 270 (Ohio) =

Highway in Ohio

Interstate 270
- The Outerbelt; Jack Nicklaus Freeway
- I-270 highlighted in red

Route information
- Auxiliary route of I-70
- Maintained by ODOT
- Length: 54.97 mi (88.47 km)
- Existed: 1962–present
- History: Completed in 1975
- NHS: Entire route

Major junctions
- Beltway around Columbus
- I-71 near Grove City; I-70 near Hilliard; US 33 in Dublin; SR 315 near Worthington; I-71 near Westerville; SR 161 near New Albany; I-670 near Gahanna; I-70 near Reynoldsburg; US 23 near Grove City

Location
- Country: United States
- State: Ohio
- Counties: Franklin

Highway system
- Interstate Highway System; Main; Auxiliary; Suffixed; Business; Future; Ohio State Highway System; Interstate; US; State; Scenic
← SR 269	→ SR 270

Interstate 270 (I-270) is an auxiliary interstate highway that forms a beltway loop freeway in the Columbus metropolitan area in the US state of Ohio, commonly known locally as The Outerbelt or the Jack Nicklaus Freeway. The zero-milepost is at the junction with Interstate 71 east of Grove City, intersecting with I-71 again near Worthington as well as connecting with Interstate 70 twice with the western junction near Lincoln Village and the eastern junction near Reynoldsburg. The route furthermore links to the eastern terminus of Interstate 670 near Gahanna and provides indirect access to John Glenn Columbus International Airport. The entire length of I-270 is 54.97 miles (88.47 km). It is one of four Interstate loops not to run concurrently with another Interstate freeway, the others being I-295 in Florida, I-485 in North Carolina, and I-610 in Texas.

== Route description ==
I-270 provides access to several suburbs and towns surrounding Columbus, including Grove City, Westerville, Worthington, Hilliard, and Dublin. Although it started as a rural bypass of Columbus, many parts of it, primarily the northern section, have become more traveled and more congested over the years, making it less popular as a bypass and more widely regarded as a "suburb connector".

I-270 starts at I-71 on the southern side, marked as exit 55, and forms a combination interchange. It then makes its way clockwise around the city with three lanes, intersecting U.S. Route 62 (US 62), Georgesville Road, and US 40 before its next major interchange, with I-70. Here, it becomes a four-lane freeway as it passes through Hilliard and Dublin.

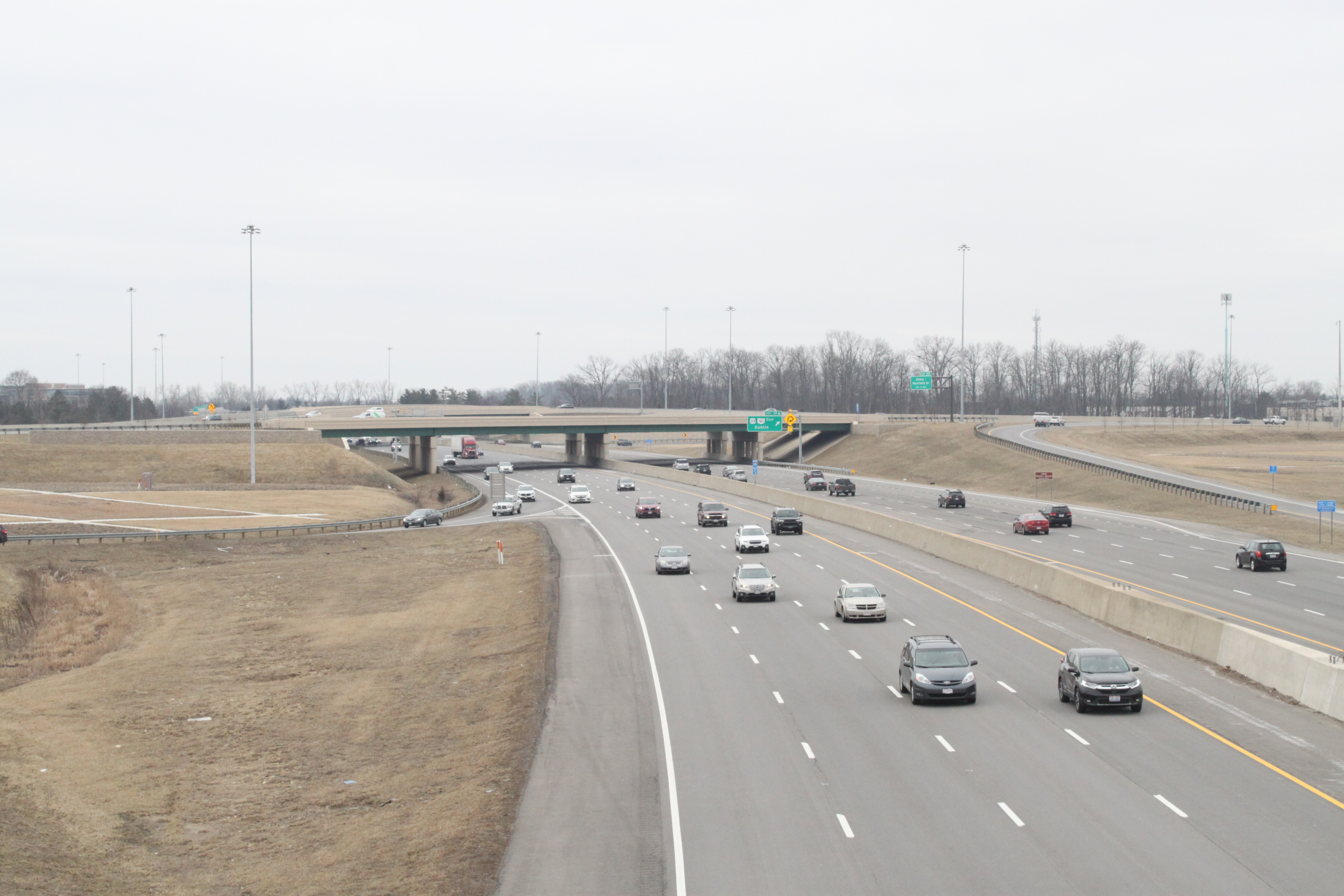
I-270 interchange at US 33/SR 161

The northwestern "corner" of I-270 has an interchange with US 33/State Route 161 (SR 161). It then makes a sharp right as it heads toward Worthington. In Worthington are the notoriously congested interchanges of three major roadways, SR 315, US 23, and I-71. This is the location of the North Side Mega-Fix, which fixed the heavy weaving section between US 23 and SR 315; however, the project also worsened weaving between US 23 and I-71, leading to frequent mile-long (1.6 km) backups.

After passing through Worthington, I-270 passes through Westerville, intersecting Cleveland Avenue and SR 3. After going through Westerville, the freeway intersects SR 161, and the freeway is divided into local–express lanes, with three local and three express lanes in each direction. This is where the freeway goes through Easton, a popular shopping destination.

Once the freeway has gone through Easton, the local–express lanes merge right before the interchange of I-670, creating a weaving section. This weave is currently being fixed in the Northbound direction as part of the I-670 Smartlane Project. After intersecting I-670, the freeway makes a hard turn left and then right to avoid both John Glenn Columbus International Airport and Gahanna. In between these two turns is a partial cloverleaf interchange with Hamilton Road, and after the turns is an interchange with SR 16. The freeway then divides from four lanes into two express lanes and three local lanes. This configuration continues up until the interchange with I-70. This interchange is planned to be entirely reconstructed to construct two flyover ramps, as well as unweave and widen I-70, as part of the Far East Freeway Study.

After the I-70 interchange, the freeway becomes much more of a rural route, with only three lanes in each direction. The next interchange after I-70 is with US 33, a cloverleaf. After this, the freeway intersects Alum Creek Drive, then US 23, before the freeway meets back with I-71, forming a loop.

== History ==
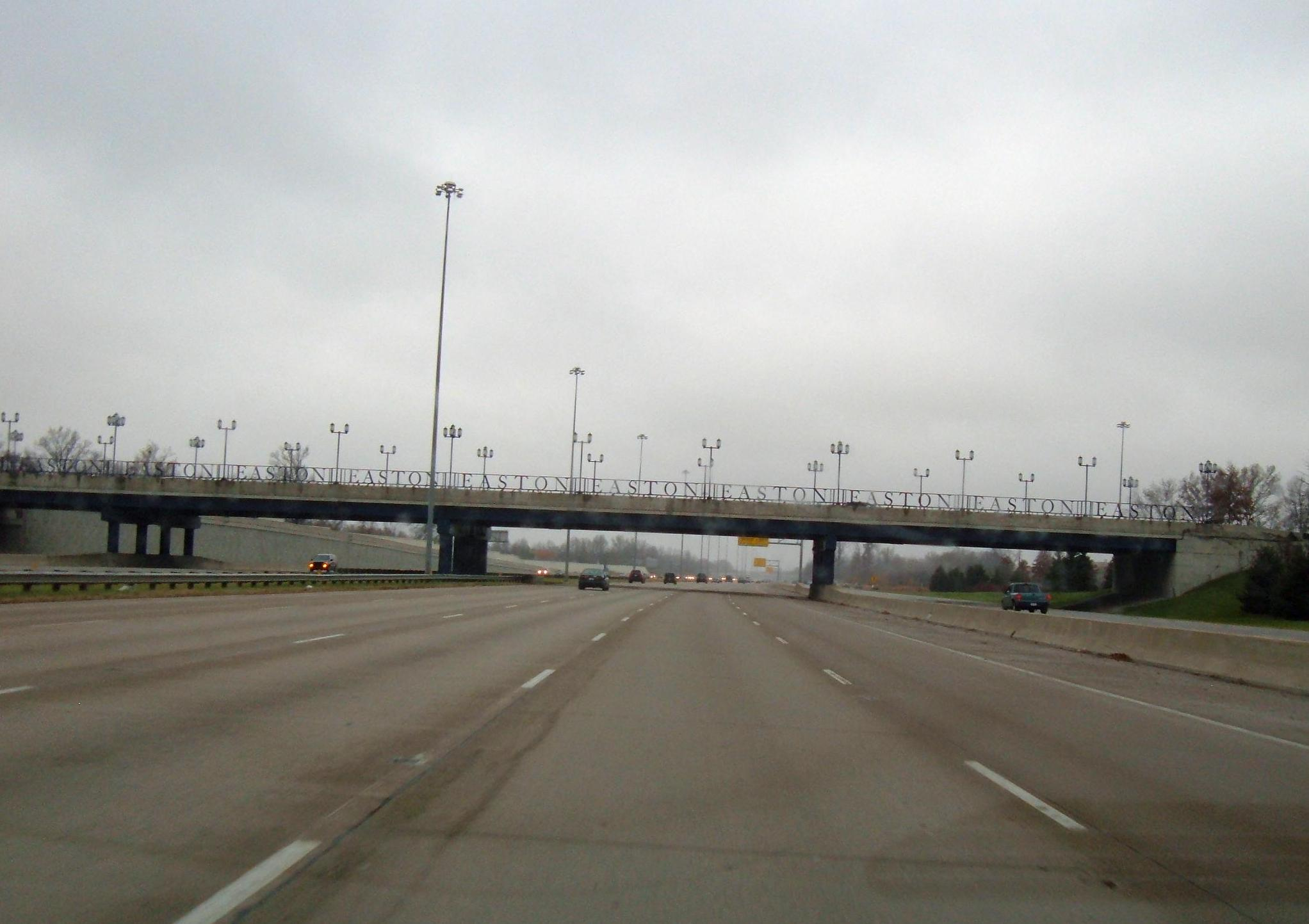
I-270 at exit 33

=== Planning ===
Planning for an outerbelt around Columbus began in the late 1950s. By the early 1960s, detailed planning for the route had begun, and several controversies arose. The first involved the location of the northern segment, which was originally planned to pass south of Worthington, passing through the Ohio School for the Deaf and just north of the then 10-year-old Graceland Shopping Center. Through vigorous lobbying throughout 1961, and with the help of Ohio Governor Michael DiSalle, residents were able to get the outerbelt relocated to pass north of Worthington.

Another contentious issue involved the routing of the eastern portion of the outerbelt between Port Columbus International Airport and the city of Gahanna. While the airport wanted the outerbelt pushed out toward Gahanna so as to leave land for future runway expansion, the residents of Gahanna wanted it pushed back toward Columbus. The final compromise led to an interesting kink in I-270 as it jogs around the airport.

=== Construction ===
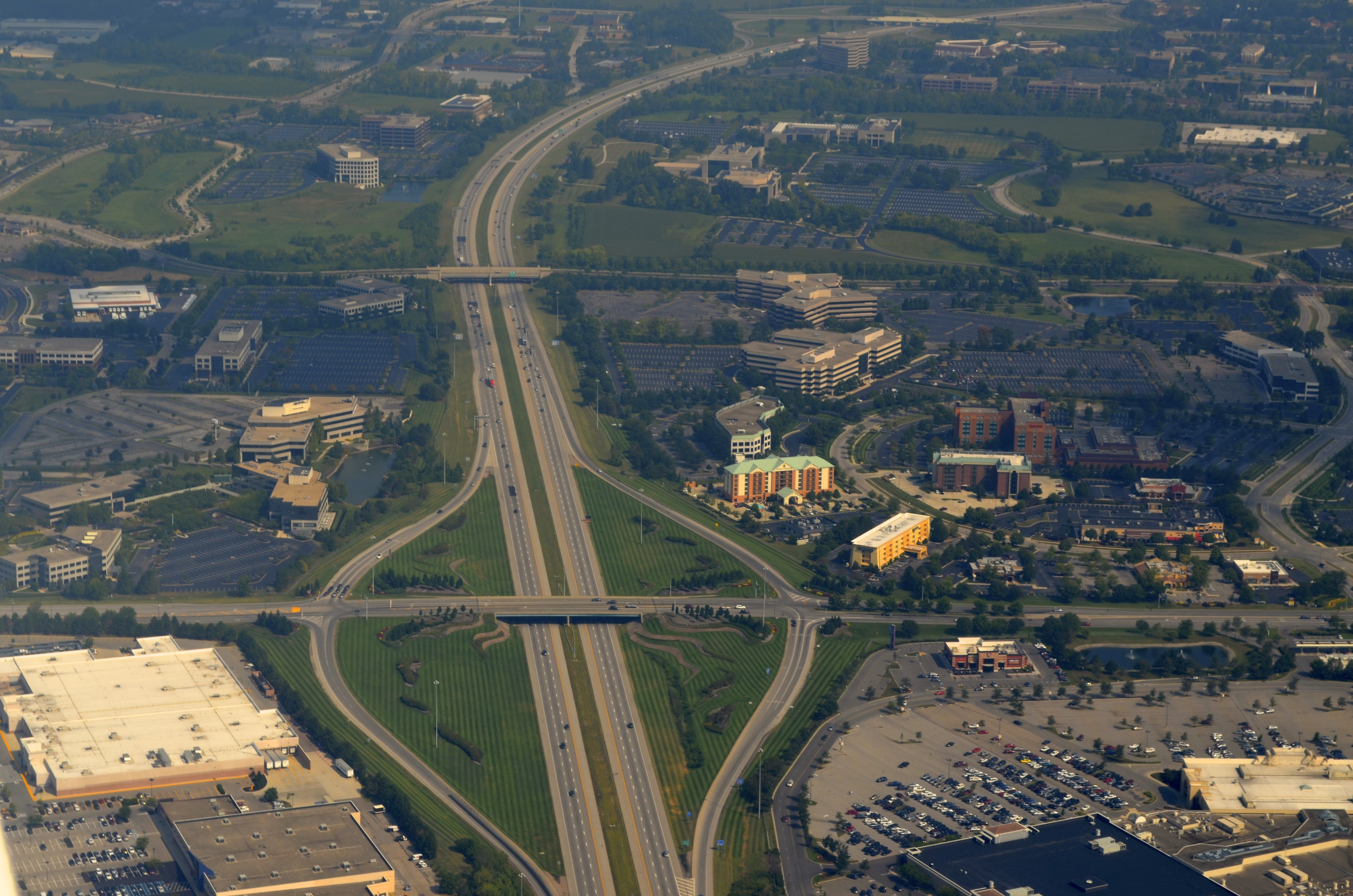
Northwest of I-270; exit 15—Tuttle Crossing Boulevard

Construction of the outerbelt began in 1962, and work was begun on various disconnected sections. The first portion to be completed connected US 23 with I-71 south of Columbus. The portion between US 23 and I-71 on the north side opened in August 1967.

The section between I-70 on the west side and I-71 on the south side opened in August 1970. In late 1970, sections opened on the east side between US 33 and I-70, and between SR 3 in Westerville and SR 161 on the east side. It was now possible to bypass Columbus using I-270 by going around the south side of the city.

In June 1971, the section between Morse Road and SR 161 on the east side opened. In October 1971, another section on the east side between I-70 and East Main Street opened. It would take four more years to complete the northeast portion of the outerbelt.

The last section of I-270, on the east side, between Hamilton Road and East Broad Street, was opened on August 20, 1975. The total cost of the 10-year construction project was $175 million (equivalent to $790 million in 2024), compared to the original 1961 estimate of $104 million (equivalent to $833 million in 2024).

=== Accidents and incidents ===
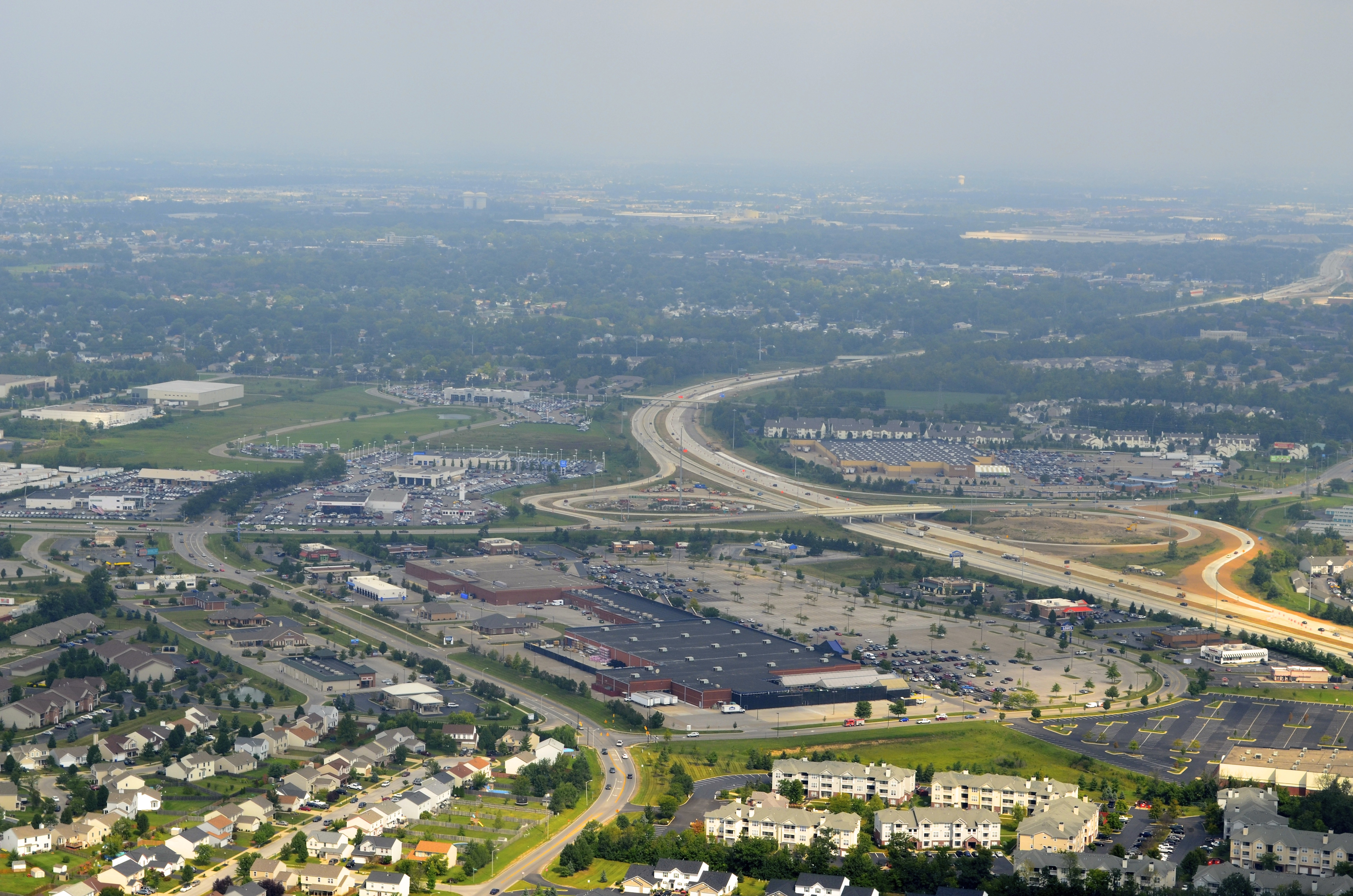
Southwest of I-270

In December 1965, during the construction of the northern section of I-270 across the N&WR and NYC-OSL railroad tracks between US 23 and I-71, the latter operator was wrecked after it hit a piece of earthmoving machinery, resulting in the operator's death and the injury of several passengers and crew. The train was dumped into the cornfield, resulting in a major operation to clean it up.

On November 4, 1968, David R. Booth, aged 29, became the first person to die on I-270 when he hit another car while merging onto US 23 from I-270.

In February 1974, three trucks traveling on I-270 on the south side near US 33 were struck by gunfire during a violent Teamsters Strike.

The highway was the subject of national media attention in 2003 when 24 sniper shootings were reported along the southern portion of the Interstate and other neighboring highways in the Ohio highway sniper attacks. On November 23, 2003, 62-year-old Gail Knisley was shot to death, making her the only fatality associated with the string of shootings. Charles A. McCoy Jr., who had been diagnosed with paranoid schizophrenia in 1996, was accused of the shootings and stood trial in 2005. The first trial with death penalty charges resulted in a hung jury on May 9, 2005, most likely due to McCoy's severe mental illness. Rather than face a retrial, McCoy accepted a plea arrangement where he avoided the death sentence. He was sentenced to 28 years in prison on August 9, 2005.

On January 23, 2017, a gas tanker carrying 8,000 US gallons (6,700 imp gal; 30,000 L) of gasoline tipped over while exiting from US 33/SR 161 onto I-270 west in Dublin. A massive fire resulted from the crash, as well as multiple small grass fires caused by the gasoline dripping down the sides of the flyover ramp. Both highways were shut down in both directions for the day, and the ramp was shut down for one week as repairs were made. The only fatality was that of the truck driver.

=== Expansion and noise barriers ===
In 1978, the first noise barriers were constructed on the portion of I-270 passing near Gahanna. Noise barriers have been slowly added around the length of the 55-mile-long (89 km) belt as development has crowded up to the noisy road.

Massive development followed the construction of I-270, especially around the north and northwest sides. The northern suburbs of Westerville, Worthington, and Dublin and Hilliard to the west benefited the most. As in other sizeable cities across America, the effect of this outerbelt driven development was to hasten the decline of the Columbus core. The south portion of I-270 was much slower to develop due to the location of sewage treatment and landfill facilities, as well as quarries and the flood prone Scioto River. Grove City began to develop in the 1990s with the addition of office/warehouse space, and the conversion of Rickenbacker Air National Guard Base to a civilian air freight facility.

== Future ==
Due to the growth of Central Ohio, there has been discussions since the 1990s of a 2nd outerbelt to help suburban sprawl. Such a 2nd outerbelt would most likely be in neighboring counties (I-270, while entirely in Franklin County, comes close to entering Delaware, Fairfield, and Pickaway counties in some areas) and would likely connect or come in close proximity to exurbs such as Circleville, Delaware, Lancaster, London, Marysville, and Newark. The proposal has been met with mixed reactions from residents and hasn't even been sent to the planning stages.

In August 2025, the Ohio Department of Transportation reactivated studies on its section of Interstate 73, which would connect Toledo with Appalachian Ohio and run through Columbus, largely on the US 23 corridor. I-73 would mostly run on the existing Ohio State Route 315 routing in Franklin County but would use part of I-270 to depart OH 315 to head towards Delaware. If Ohio does build its section of I-73, I-270 would have a brief concurrency with the new route.

== Exit list ==
The entire route is in Franklin County.

Location	mi	km	Old exit	New exit	Destinations	Notes
Jackson Township	0.00– 54.97	0.00– 88.47	1	55	I-71 – Columbus, Cincinnati	Signed as exits 55A (north) & 55B (south); I-71 exit 101 southbound, 101A-B northbound
Jackson Township	2.13	3.43	2	2	US 62 / SR 3 – Grove City	
Columbus	4.97	8.00	3	5	Georgesville Road	Cardinal direction change: westbound becomes northbound & southbound becomes eastbound (Note: As indicated by guide signs and reassurance markers at Georgesville Road. However, change is noted on the mainline at milepost 4.4.)
Franklin–Prairie township line	6.91– 7.04	11.12– 11.33	4	7	US 40 (Broad Street)	Signed as exits 7A (west) and 7B (east) southbound, northbound combined as exit 7
Columbus	8.69– 8.71	13.99– 14.02	5	8	I-70 – Columbus, Dayton, Indianapolis	I-70 exit 93 westbound, 93A-B eastbound.
Columbus	10.50	16.90	6	10	Roberts Road	diverging diamond interchange
Hilliard	12.63– 12.64	20.33– 20.34	7A	13	Fishinger Blvd – Upper Arlington; Cemetery Road – Hilliard, Franklin County Fairgrounds	Signed as exits 13A (Fishinger Blvd) and 13B (Cemetery Road) northbound, southbound combined as exit 13
Hilliard	13.8	22.2		14	Davidson Road	Proposed
Columbus	15.63	25.15	7B	15	Tuttle Crossing Blvd	
Dublin	17.29– 17.31	27.83– 27.86	8	17	US 33 / SR 161 – Dublin, Muirfield, Marysville, Plain City	Signed as exits 17A (east, north) and 17B (west, south); Cardinal direction change: northbound becomes eastbound & westbound becomes southbound (Note: As indicated by milemarkers.)
Dublin–Columbus line	19.82	31.90	9	20	Sawmill Road – Columbus Zoo and Aquarium, Zoombezi Bay, Muirfield (WB)	First SPUI in Ohio
Sharon Township	22.78	36.66	10	22	SR 315	Signed as exits 22A (south) and 22B (north) (Eastbound)
Sharon Township	23.78	38.27	11	23	US 23 – Worthington, Delaware, Toledo	Formerly Signed as exits 23A (south) and 23B (north)
Columbus	25.83	41.57	12	26	I-71 – Columbus, Cleveland	I-71 no exit 119 northbound, 119A-B southbound.
Columbus–Blendon Township line	27.38	44.06	13	27	SR 710 west (Cleveland Avenue)	Signed as exits 27A (south) and 27B (north/west); Eastern terminus of SR 710 last exit to be I-270 eastbound, at Westerville Road it changes directions to I-270 southbound
Blendon Township	28.71	46.20	14	29	SR 3 – Westerville	Cardinal direction change: eastbound becomes southbound & northbound becomes westbound (Note: As indicated by milemarkers and guide signs.); SR 3 known as State Street north of I-270 and Westerville Road south of I-270
Blendon Township–Columbus line	30.53	49.13	15	30	SR 161 – Worthington, New Albany	Signed as exits 30A (south) and 30B (north); shares C-D roads with exit 33
Columbus	32.27	51.93	16	32	Morse Road	No connection to exits 30 or 33
Columbus	32.92	52.98	17A	33	Easton Way – Easton	Shares C-D roads with exit 30
Mifflin Township	35.16– 35.51	56.58– 57.15	17B	35	I-670 west / US 62 west – Airport US 62 east – Gahanna; Johnstown Road	Signed as exits 35A (I-670/US 62 west), 35B (US 62 east) and 35C (Johnstown Road) southbound; Only access to Johnstown Road is northbound exit
Gahanna	37.36	60.13	18	37	SR 317 (Hamilton Road)	
Columbus	39.53	63.62	19	39	SR 16 (Broad Street) / Taylor Station Road – Whitehall	Signed as exits 39A (west) and 39B (east); Only access to Taylor Station Road is northbound exit (via Old Morrison Road and Westbourne Avenue)
Columbus	41.32	66.50	20	41	US 40 (Main St) – Whitehall, Reynoldsburg	Signed as exits 41A (west) and 41B (east); shares C-D roads with exit 43
Columbus	42.82	68.91	21	43	I-70 – Columbus, Wheeling	Signed as exits 43A (west) & 43B (east); shares C-D roads with exit 41; I-70 exit 108 eastbound, 108A-B westbound.
Columbus	46.13	74.24	22	46	US 33 – Bexley, Lancaster	Signed as exits 46A (west) and 46B (east)
Obetz	48.98	78.83	23	49	Alum Creek Drive – Obetz, Rickenbacker Int'l Airport	Cardinal direction change: Southbound becomes westbound & eastbound becomes northbound (Note: As indicated by guide signs and reassurance markers at Alum Creek Drive. However, change is noted on the mainline after milepost 48.)
Hamilton Township	52.72	84.84	24	52	US 23 / South High Street – Columbus, Circleville	Signed as exits 52A (north) and 52B (south) westbound; Access to Scioto Downs (SB)
1.000 mi = 1.609 km; 1.000 km = 0.621 mi: Incomplete access; Unopened

== Hazardous materials ==
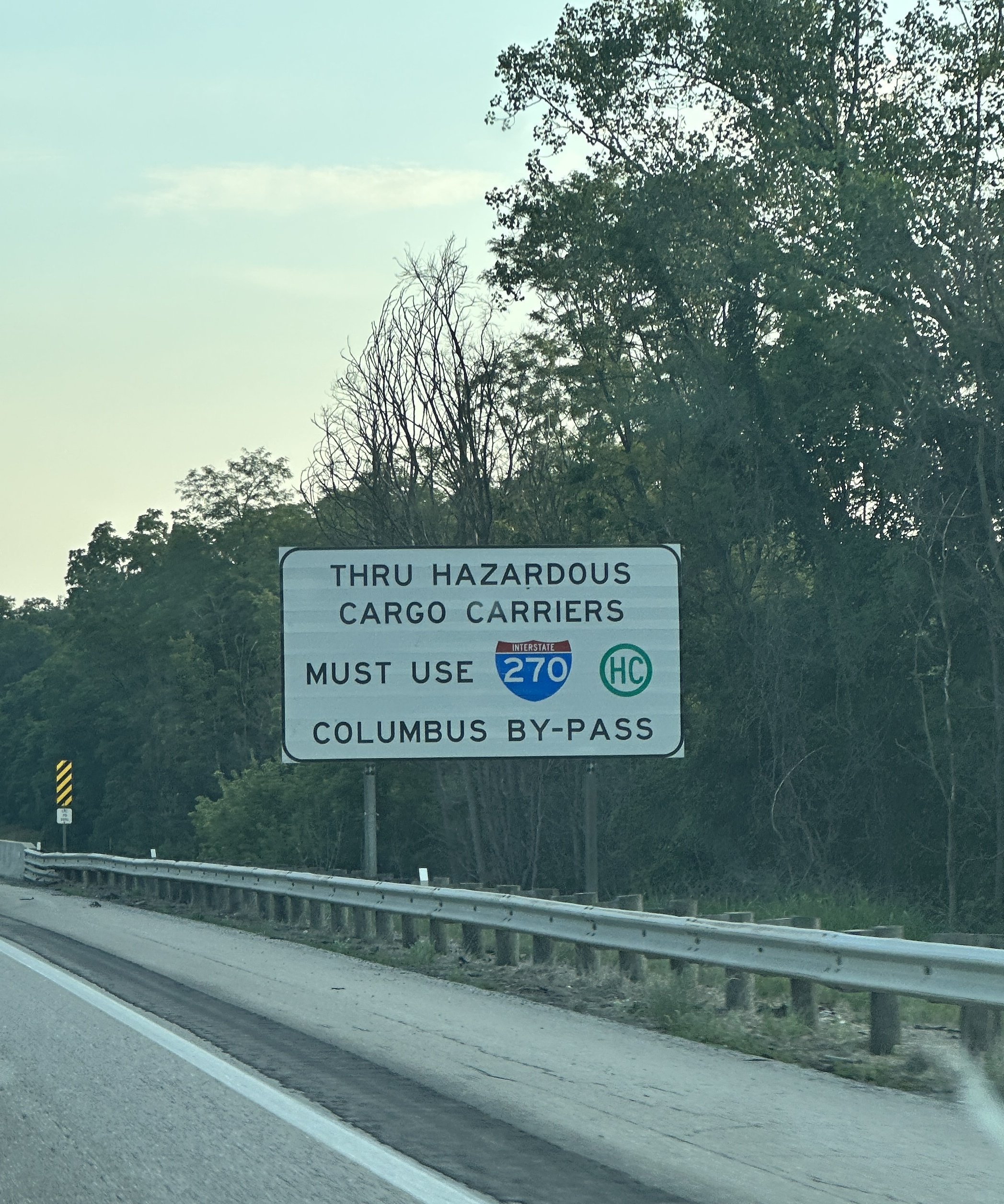
A sign on I-71 stating that thru hazmat carriers must use 270.

Columbus City Code section 2550.04 currently requires trucks which are transporting hazardous cargo and materials and do not have a point of origin or destination inside of I-270 to bypass the city using I-270 and not use any roadway located inside of the outerbelt. The code's text cites the dense population of the Columbus area, and local law firms note that police frequently pull over trucks with HazMat placards to check the trucker's papers. Transporting HazMats within I-270 without proper documentation are a misdemeanor of the first degree.

In 2015, an Ohio State Appellate Court ruled in State v. Mitchell (2015 ERB 074646) that truckers carrying both HazMats and non-HazMats may not transport the HazMats within Interstate 270 while delivering or retrieving non-HazMats, signifying that any truck carrying HazMats and non-HazMats must drop off its HazMats first before entering roadways within I-270.
