= Chuckery (disambiguation) =

Chuckery may refer to:

- Chuckery, a suburb of Walsall, England
- Chuckery, Ohio, an unincorporated community in Ohio, United States
- The Chuckery, a former football ground in Walsall, England
