= Farmers National Bank (Plain City, Ohio) =

- U.S. National Register of Historic Places
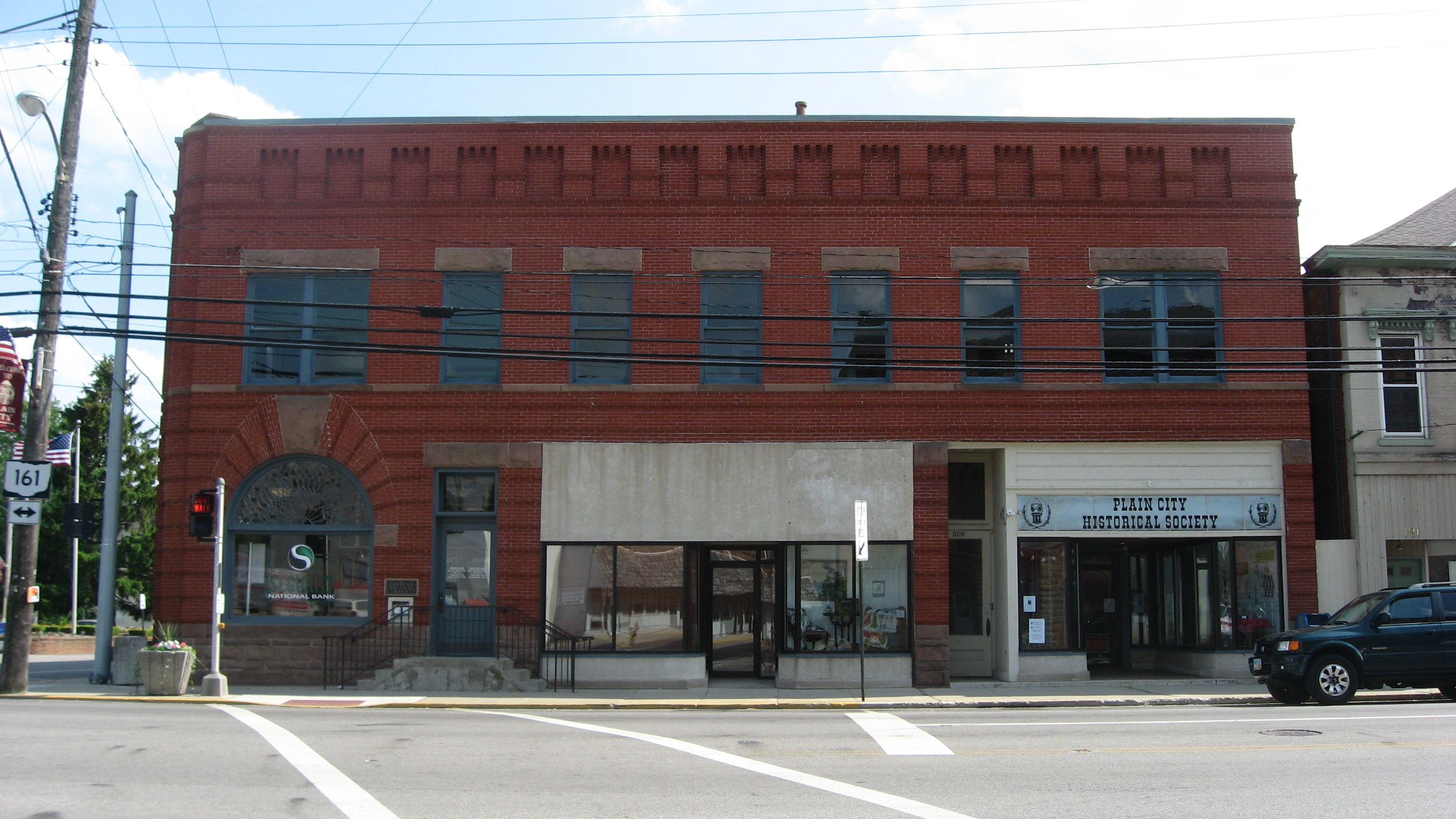
- Front of the bank

- Location within Ohio Location within the United States
- Location: Southwestern corner of the junction of Main and Chillicothe Sts. in Plain City, Ohio
- Coordinates: 40°6′27″N 83°16′3″W
- Built: 1902
- Architectural style: Early Commercial
- NRHP reference No.: 95000168
- Added to NRHP: March 9, 1995

Farmers National Bank is a bank building in the village of Plain City in Madison County, Ohio, United States. The bank is located at the intersection of State Route 161 and Chillicothe Street. Built in 1902, it was listed on the National Register of Historic Places in 1995.

== Early history ==
The Farmers National Bank of Plain City was organized on August 6, 1900, with a capital stock of $25,000. In 1902, the bank built a brick building at the corners of what was then Post Road & Chillicothe Street. The building cost $15,289.27 to build, The bank's first president was William Atkinson, of whom an oil portrait hangs in the lobby. In 1907, C. F. Dutton became president, followed by Cephas Atkinson in 1914. As of 1915, the bank held $263,670.79 in deposits, $40,073.99 in surplus and undivided profits, and $266,656.36 in loans. In 1934, the company received FDIC deposit insurance.

== Recent history ==
In 1993, Farmers National Bank was purchased by Park National Bank of Urbana, Ohio, and its name was changed to Citizens National Bank. This change also saw the arrival of the bank's first computers, and the removal of the two .38 caliber revolvers kept behind the counter. In 1995, the building was listed on the National Register of Historic Places, and was featured on Union County's 'Bicentennial Homes and Buildings' tour in 2003. In 2004, Mary Mitchell, the president at the time, retired after a 60-year career at the bank, starting as a teller in 1944. In recognition of her career, Mitchell's portrait was hung on the wall of the lobby opposite Atkinson's. On July 20, 2009, Park National again changed the name from Citizens National Bank to Security National Bank. On September 30, 2020, Park National Bank closed this branch, along with 20 other branches in Ohio, and, as of January 2021, the building is unused.

The bank is regionally famous for having never been successfully robbed, although there was one unsuccessful attempt in 1934. This is due in part to the lobby being separated from the tellers by a steel cage and 1 inch (25 mm) thick bulletproof glass.
