= Charles Crapsey =

American architect (1849–1909)

Charles C. Crapsey (November 25, 1849 – July 26, 1909) was an American architect known for his church designs. He trained under James K. Wilson from 1865 to 1873, worked on his own between 1873 and 1888, and then with Wilson again from 1895 to 1901. He worked with William R. Brown from 1889 to 1895 and with E. N. Lamm from 1901 to 1909. His work is distinctive for its creative combinations of shaping, massing, and materials, and Crapsey is known especially for his design of churches. He was born in Fairmount, Ohio, and died in Cincinnati.

Crapsey began his career working mainly on the design of residences. He designed the Shingle Style Nathan F. Baker House on Madison Rd. in East Walnut Hills (1883) for the sculptor and relative of Crapsey's mentor James K. Wilson. A print and floor plan of the house appeared in the June 9, 1883 American Architect and Building News. He also designed a "Five-Thousand-Dollar Suburban Home" in the Cincinnati suburb of Hartwell in 1886, and some commercial buildings.

Crapsey & Brown specialized in church architecture. Crapsey belonged to the Methodist church and obtained several commissions for their buildings. Brown had already been doing church design before they teamed up. According to the Architectural Foundation of Cincinnati, "They were among the first firm to exploit the "Akron Plan", which included Sunday School rooms within the main Church building connected by moveable screens." These "were sought after by many Protestant denominations, not only in Ohio and Kentucky, but as far as a $300,000 Presbyterian Church for Seattle, Washington" which was designed by Crapsey & Lamm in 1906. He and his partners also designed church-related educational buildings including a dormitory for Ohio Wesleyan College (Delaware, Ohio) in 1889 and Methodist missionary schools and chapels in China.

Crapsey's obituary in the Western Architect & Builder "made a specialty of church architecture, and as much as, perhaps more, than any other architect of the country, developed the institutional church building," and an obituary in the Western Christian Advocate described Crapsey as "an architect by instinct and training." Honorary pallbearers representing the American Institute of Architects included James W. McLaughlin, S.S. Godley, and George W. Rapp, "all major Cincinnati architects during the second half of the 19th century". Real pallbearers were selected from members of his Bible class.

A double-page magazine feature of Crapsey & Brown's churches was published in the American Architect & Building News, XXXVIII, 822 November 19, 1892, including examples in Cincinnati and Kenton, Ohio, and Maysville, Mayslick, Carlisle, Covington, and Dayton, Kentucky. They were also active in Hamilton, Ohio, and Winchester, Kentucky (where Lamm seems to have been a builder, and perhaps designer, early in his career). The spread also included prices such as $27,000 Kenton, Ohio church and $10,000 for the Price Hill, Cincinnati church with "stones to window sills and shingles above".

Crapsey & Brown used a wide variety of materials, often in combination achieving great variety in shape, massing, and effect. Crapsey competed for the design of the Cincinnati Centennial Exposition building (1887; won by H.E. Siter; expo held 1888) and the Cincinnati Armory (won by Samuel Hannaford; 1887).

== Projects ==
Known churches and other commissions in Ohio were located in London, Fostoria, Loveland, Ironton, Waynesville, Portsmouth, Woodstock, Xenia, Franklin, Washington Court House, Lima, Jackson, Mechanicsburg, Miamisburg, Milford, Columbus, Carthage and areas of Cincinnati. In Kentucky his projects included buildings in Henderson, Newport, Richmond, Mount Sterling, Danville, Augusta and Ludlow.

=== Indiana ===
- Methodist Episcopal Church (1895) in Connersville, Indiana (now First United Methodist)
- Second Presbyterian (1895) in Bloomington, Indiana
- Ninth St. Methodist Church (1895) in Lafayette, Indiana

=== Other areas ===
Crapsey & Lamm designed the Moores Hill College Administration Building (1907).

Maysville, Kentucky, has "a particularly important grouping" of churches, commercial buildings, a Masonic Lodge, and residences, "all within a block of each other and still remarkably intact."

According to the Architectural Foundation of Cincinnati, the best surviving churches are the First English Lutheran, Race St. and 12th St. opposite Washington Park (1894); Clifton Methodist, SEC Clifton Ave. and Senator Place (1891); and the Price Hill M.E., NWC Phillips and Considine avenues (now the Church of the Nazarene; 1895). Their smaller churches also have charm. They "have a recognizable, distinctive, and "artistic" character; among their late 19th-century contemporaries, they are more individual and even fantastic than Samuel Hannaford or McLaughlin, although usually less so than (for example) Buddemeyer, Plympton & Trowbridge. The Clifton United Methodist (1892) Church at 3416 Clifton Avenue in Cincinnati is a Richardsonian Romanesque style building by Charles completed in 1892. It includes an Akron plan and an interior with vaulted timberwork, wooden trusses and LaFarge and Armstrong (John LaFarge and Maitland and Helen Armstrong) stained glass window.

== Non-church buildings ==
Among Crapsey & Brown's non-ecclesiastical works were new pavilions for the "pioneering" Cincinnati Base Ball Co. (the "Red Stockings") in the West End (1884)

- Workhouse, Jail, and Police Court in Newport, Kentucky (behind the Court House by Albert C. Nash) (1887)
- Westwood Town Hall, a Shingle-Style complex containing a variety of municipal facilities at SWC Harrison and Fairview avenues
- a competition design for the Cincinnati Y.M.C.A. Building (1889) (NWC Seventh and Walnut streets (won by James W. McLaughlin)
- H.C. Carrel, the delineator, submitted his rendering to the 1889 Cincinnati Architectural Club exhibition
- competition entry for the Odd Fellows' Temple (1891) delineated by G. W. E. Field, who may have worked for the firm early in his career) (competition won by Samuel Hannaford) formerly NWC Elm and Seventh streets
- the Tippecanoe School (Cincinnati, 1893)
- Parkersburg, West Virginia, City Hall (1894).
- Crapsey, Carrel and Crapsey presented a Beaux-Arts competition design for a Jubilee Saengerfest Building in 1898
- Crapsey & Lamm designed the Carnegie Library for Peru, Indiana (1902)
- Kendallville Furniture Co. Factory (1907) Peru Indiana
- Monterey Industrial Co. in Mexico. Residential work was also constant.

Crapsey himself was an early member of the Cincinnati Chapter of the AIA, as a junior member in their founding year of 1870, and served as secretary from at least 1874 until 1895. He was also an FAIA. W. W. Martin, an advocate of the "Akron Plan," in his Manual of Ecclesiastical Architecture (Cincinnati: Jennings & Pye, 1897), credits Crapsey with supplying "a valuable collection of photographs and engravings upon Modern Church Architecture."

== Crapsey & Brown ==
- Clifton Methodist Episcopal Church 3418 Clifton Ave. Cincinnati
- First Presbyterian Church/Calvary Temple Evangelical Church 946 Market St. Parkersburg, West Virginia
- First United Methodist Church 52 N. Main St. London, Ohio

== Crapsey and Lamm ==
- Carnegie Hall of Moores Hill College 14687 Main St. Moores Hill, Indiana

== Additional citations ==
- Langsam (1997), 3, 64–65, 72-73
- Painter and Sullebarger, AIC (2006), 69, 90, 117, 125, 288
- Obituary, Western Architect &Builder, XXVI, 32 (8/12/1909), 1
- Western Christian Advocate (8/4/1909)
- Withey (1956, 1970), 147-48
- Tenkotte and Langsam, 89-96
- Sullebarger (1990)
- Jackson and Gilder (2006), 285, 284
- Nuxhall, SGC, 113, Lot 434
