= Cary Village Site =

Archaeological site in Ohio, United States

- U.S. National Register of Historic Places
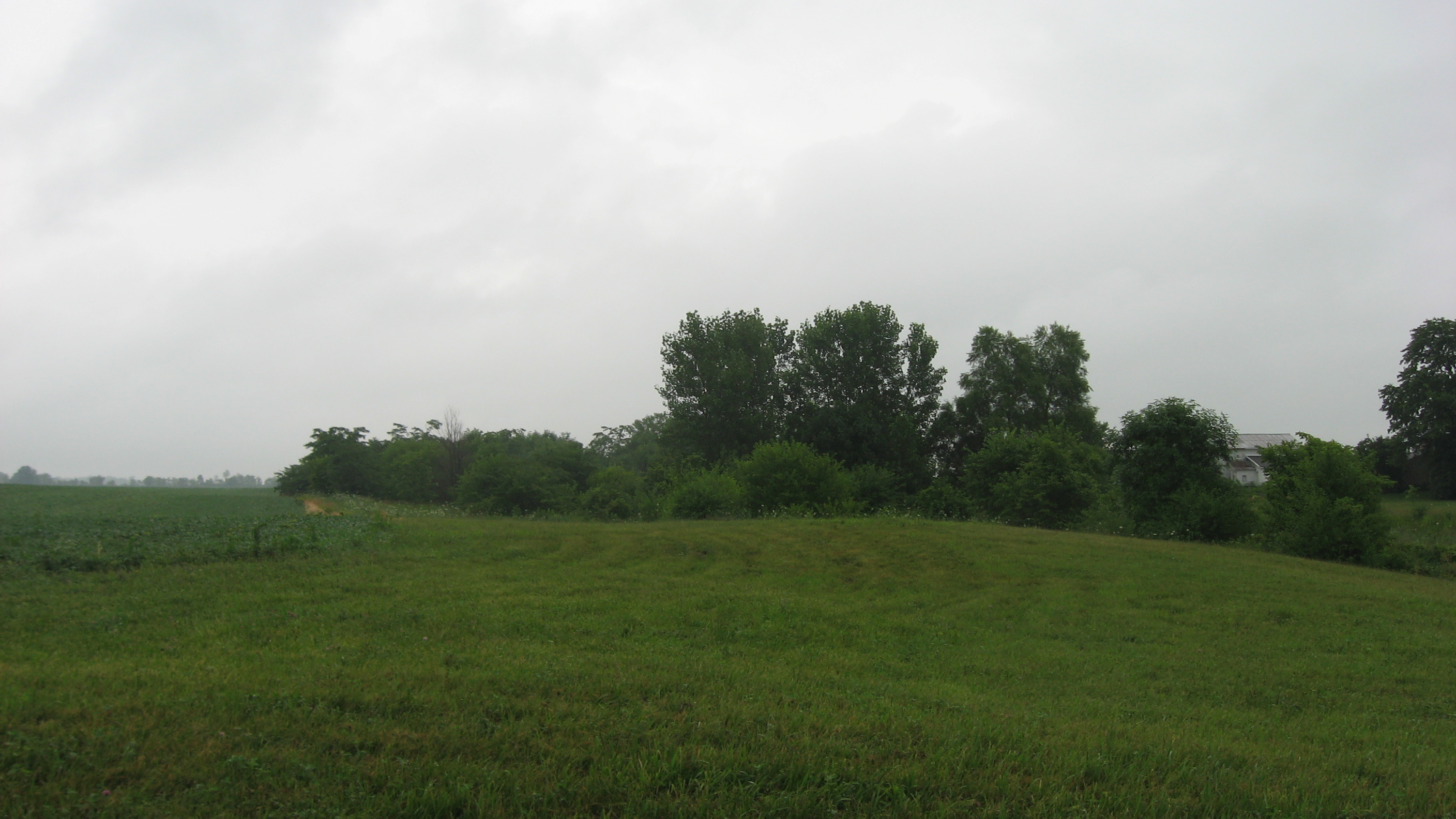
- Overview of the site from the west

- Location within Ohio Location within the United States
- Location: Amid fields around the Cary Ditch, southeast of Plain City
- Nearest city: Plain City, Ohio
- Coordinates: 40°4′49.2″N 83°14′46.2″W
- Area: 60 acres (24 ha)
- NRHP reference No.: 75001479
- Added to NRHP: May 13, 1975

The Cary Village Site (designated 33-MA-6) is an archaeological site in the west-central portion of the U.S. state of Ohio. Located southeast of the village of Plain City in Madison County, the site occupies a group of grassy terraces located amid two farm fields. In this grassy area, archaeologists have discovered a wide range of artifacts, including stone tools, materials made of flint, and various types of pottery.

Rather than being all of a single type, the artifacts differ so greatly from each other that the site was probably occupied throughout a long period of time. Evidence exists for the presence of villages at the site during the Paleoindian, Archaic, Woodland, and Mississippian periods, although the Woodland period Hopewell inhabitants left the greatest number of artifacts.

Everything that has been found at the site is known from surface collection; therefore, it is uncertain what artifacts remain buried. However, some elements can be guessed to be present, judging by findings from similar sites. If Cary Village be a typical Middle Woodland village, it includes multiple hearths, burials, posthole patterns, storage pits, and middens. Because the site has never been excavated, it yet is presumed to hold many features, and it is thus a valuable archaeological site. In recognition of its archaeological value, the Cary Village Site was listed on the National Register of Historic Places in 1975. It is one of two archaeological sites on the Register in Madison County, along with the Skunk Hill Mounds near West Jefferson, which are believed to have been built by the Adena culture.
