= Nanette B. Paul =

American legal scholar, lawyer, suffragist, author, instructor and lecturer

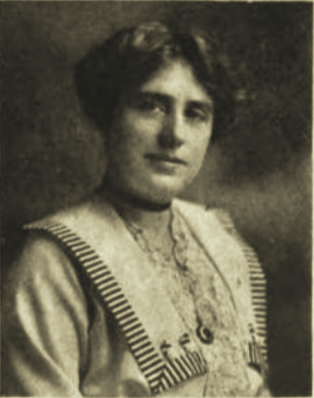
- Paul in 1912
- Born: Nanette Baker; March 29, 1866; Delaware County, Ohio, U.S.
- Died: April 10, 1928 (aged 62); Washington, D.C.
- Occupations: legal scholar, lawyer, suffragist, author, instructor, and lecturer
- Known for: founder, Paul's Institute; co-founder, Susan B. Anthony Foundation
- Notable work: Parliamentary law (1908)
- Spouse: Daniel Paul (m. 1888)

Nanette B. Paul (1866–1928) was an American legal scholar, lawyer, suffragist, author, instructor, and lecturer. She was a widely-known authority on parliamentary law. Actively identified with the woman suffrage movement, Paul served as vice-president and was the co-founder of the Susan B. Anthony Foundation. She also established a biblical museum and a finishing school for girls.

== Early life and education ==
Nanette Baker was born on a farm in Delaware County, Ohio, on March 29, 1866. Her parents were William and Jane (Kilgore) Baker. Her father, who was of an English family tracing descent from William the Conqueror, came from England to Pittsburgh, Pennsylvania, at the age of ten. Her mother's ancestors lived for many generations in Pennsylvania, several of them serving in the Revolutionary War. Nanette had at least two sisters, Mrs. Ida R. Smith of Los Angeles, and Mrs. Madge McIntyre.

Paul was educated in country schools, and in the high school at Plain City, Ohio. In 1900, Paul was graduated LL.B. at the Washington College of Law, and was admitted to the Bar of the District of Columbia. She was the third graduate of the college, which she helped to found.

== Career ==
Paul began teaching at the age of 17.

Parliamentary law (1908)

The heart of Blackstone (1915)

She was a member of the faculty of the Washington College of Law, and lectured widely on parliamentary law, in which she was a specialist. Her textbook, Paul's Parliamentary Law, published in 1908, contains original diagrams to illustrate the order of motions. These were reproduced in large charts, 33 by 46 inches (840 mm × 1,170 mm), for the use of schools, clubs, and classes. Paul directed classes in this subject, under the auspices of the Anthony League. The principles of the common law were described in simple language in The Heart of Blackstone, or Principles of the Common Law, which also provided information concerning the source of the common law, the general principles of law, rights of persons and corporations, rights of personal and real property, civil injuries, public wrongs or crimes, courts and their process, and international law.

Paul was an active worker in the foundation for the purpose of erecting a memorial to Susan B. Anthony in Washington, D.C. The foundation was the outgrowth of the Susan B Anthony League, organized in Washington, D.C. in 1912, and co-founded by Paul.

Paul was for many years a member of the Society for the Study of Comparative Religion of the Unitarian church. She was widely known for her collection of biblical costumes from the Holy Land, incorporating them in pageants and lectures. She opened a Biblical Museum of costumes and articles from the Holy Land, collected originally by Madame Lydia Mamreoff Von Finkelstein Mountford, and used by Paul in her lectures on the life of Christ, for classes studying the Bible from the human standpoint. Paul gave lectures on the life of the people of the Holy Land, and on the human side of Bible characters, before many churches and classes, and as a Chautauqua lecturer.

She was an active worker for woman suffrage. She also wrote short stories and articles.

Paul was one of the founders of the National Progressive Educational Association, and a charter member of the Anthony League of the District of Columbia. She was a member of the National League of American Pen Women, Twentieth Century Club, Alumni Association of Washington College of Law, D.C. Suffrage Association, College Women's Club of Washington, the Woman's Bar Association of the District of Columbia, and the Archaeological Society. She served as vice-chair of the Legislative Committee, General Federation of Women's Clubs; and as vice-president of the White House Chapter, American Woman's Republic.

=== Paul Institute ===
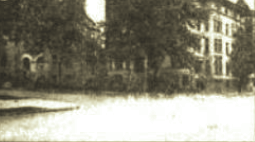
Paul Institute in 1917

The Paul Institute, located in Washington, D.C. at 2107 S. St., N.W., was a finishing, boarding, and day school for girls. It was conducted by Paul, with Harriet E. Evans as principal. Established in 1893 by Mr. and Mrs. Smallwood, the school was previously known as the Washington Seminary. The school enrolled students in several branches including vocational training, high school, college preparation, and post-graduate courses. Academic courses included science, literature, English, French, music, art, studio, and languages. Practical and vocational courses included business, journalism, short story writing, parliamentary law, kindergarten training, and domestic science. Rhythmic physical training was also offered. In addition, the institute offers advanced courses in citizenship, public speaking, psychology, symbolism, and metaphysics. The Paul Institute was affiliated with the Washington College of Music.

== Personal life ==
On April 11, 1888, at Centerburg, Ohio, she married Daniel Paul, a native of Licking County, Ohio, who left farming to enter the Ohio State Senate, afterwards holding various minor offices and later in life, becoming a banker.

In religion, she was Unitarian.

On April 10, 1928, at the age of 62, Nanette B. Paul died in Washington, D.C. after a long illness.

== Selected works ==
- Parliamentary Law, 1908 (text)
- The Heart of Blackstone, or Principles of the Common Law, 1915 (text)
