= Chuckery, Ohio =

- Unincorporated community
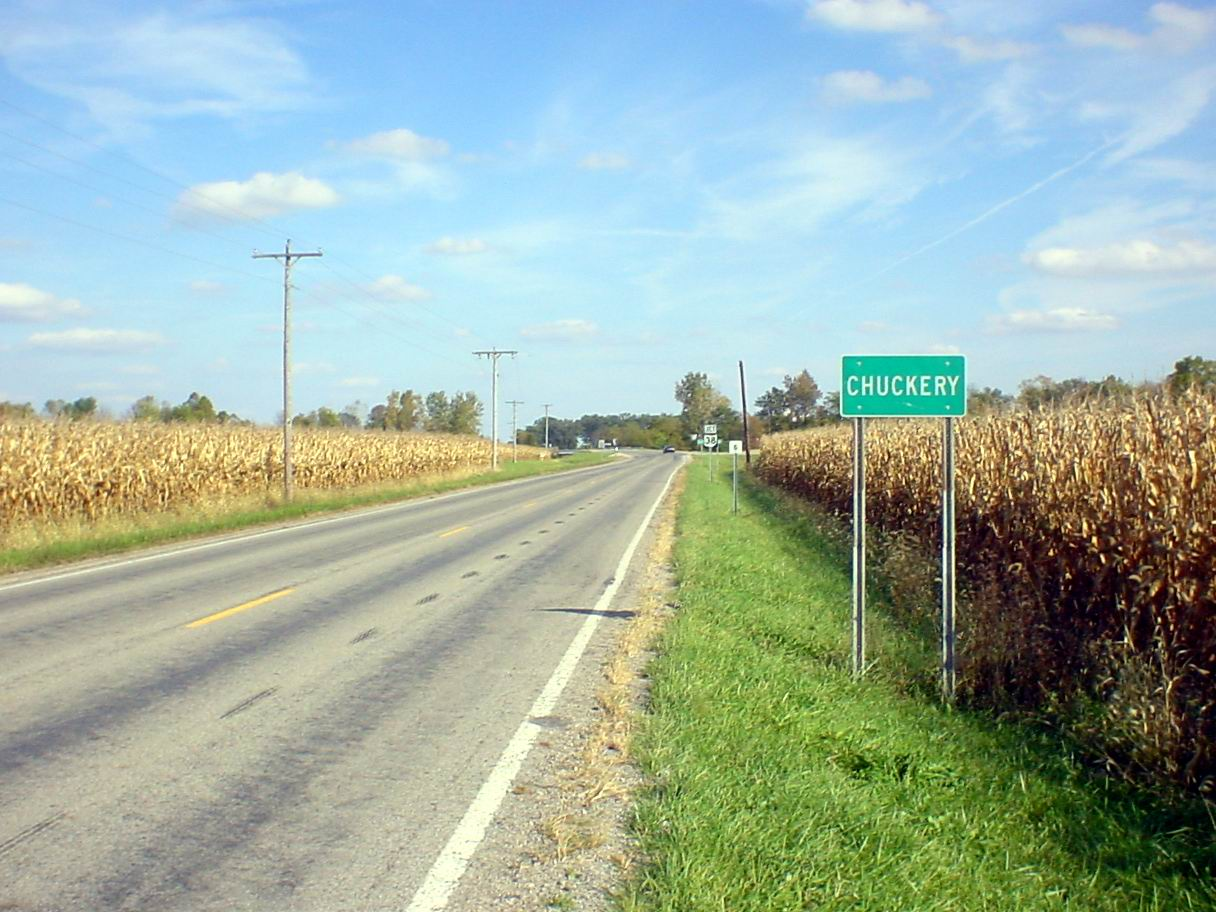
- Chuckery sign along Ohio State Route 161

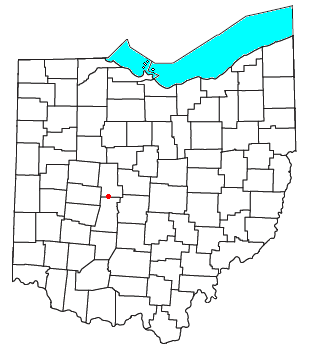
- Location of Chuckery, Ohio
- Coordinates: 40°06′42″N 83°23′26″W
- Country: United States
- State: Ohio
- County: Union
- Elevation: 981 ft (299 m)
- Time zone: UTC-5 (Eastern (EST))
  - Summer (DST): UTC-4 (EDT)
- ZIP code: 43064
- Area code: 614
- GNIS feature ID: 1039100

Chuckery is an unincorporated community located in far southwestern Darby Township, Union County, Ohio, United States. It is located at the intersection of State Routes 38 and 161.

== History ==
With a history beginning in the early 19th century, it has risen and fallen in population, infrastructure, and presence. The Little Darby Creek runs directly through the town, and the original stream was dredged around 1921. Approximately 6 miles (9.7 km) of the Little Darby was rerouted in order to reduce the meanderings of the stream, and to assist in flood control. The dredge route took place from Route 4 at Irwin heading east, then turned south and continued into Madison County until stopping at the intersection of Rosedale Plain City Road. The Chuckery Post office was established on April 8, 1898, but was discontinued on December 14, 1903. The mail service is now sent through the Plain City branch.

St. Paul's Lutheran Church, which was organized in 1892 and built in 1964, is a significant part of the community.
