= Mutual, Ohio =

- Village
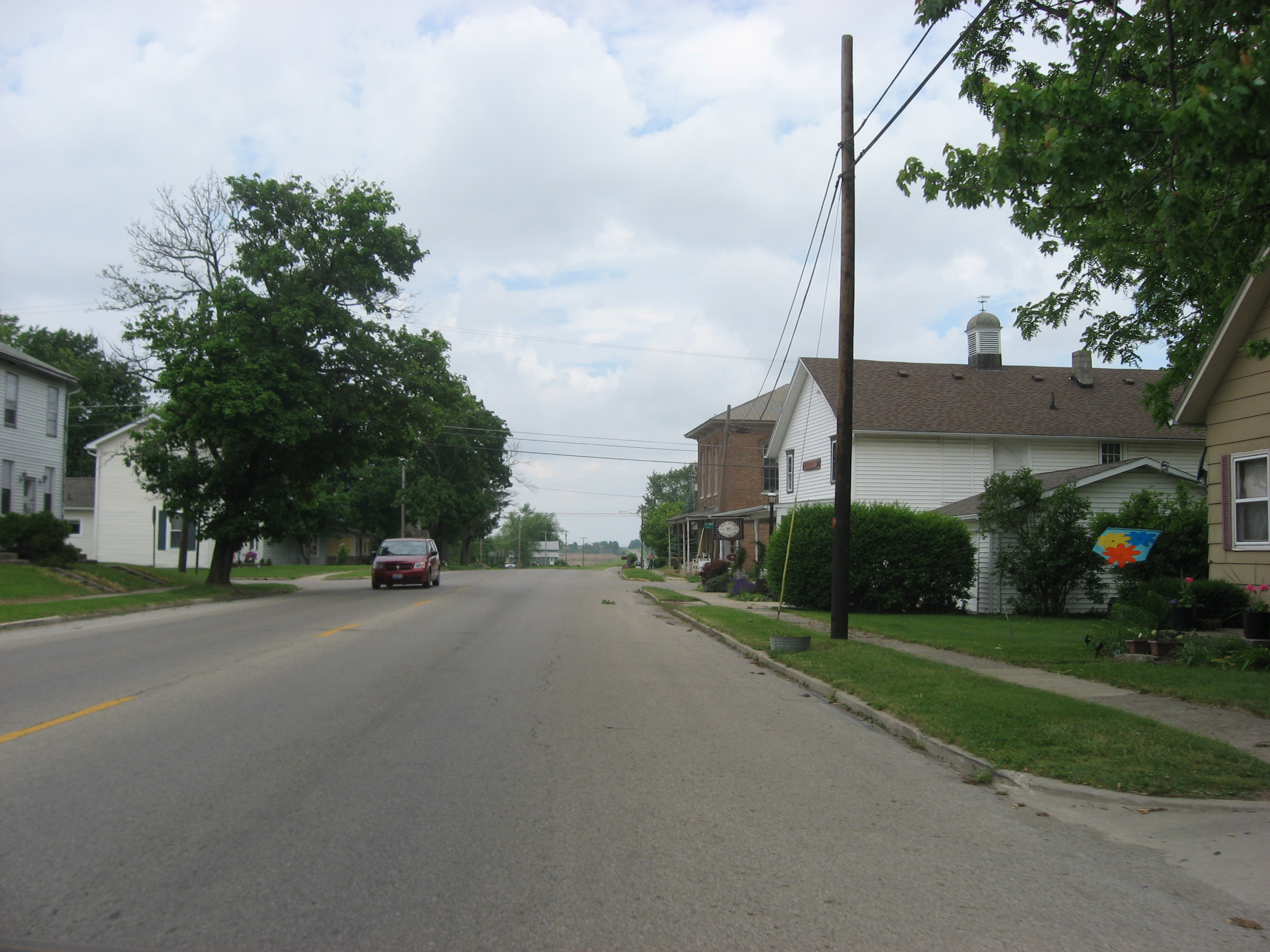
- Along Mutual's main street

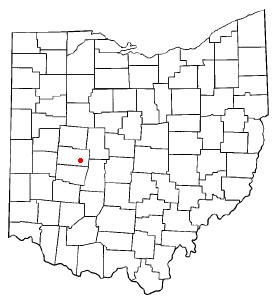
- Location of Mutual, Ohio

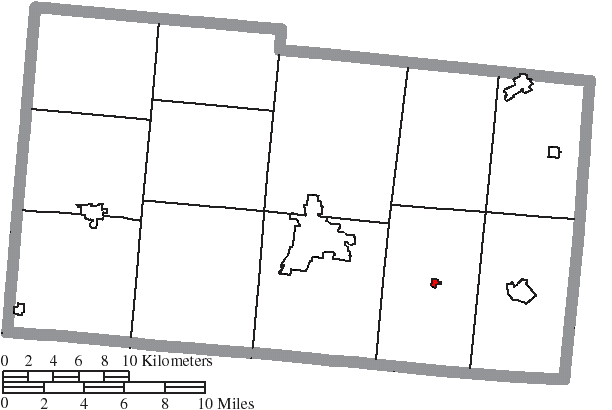
- Location of Mutual in Champaign County
- Coordinates: 40°04′46″N 83°38′13″W
- Country: United States
- State: Ohio
- County: Champaign
- Township: Union

Government
  - Type: Administrative Council
  - Executive Chairman of Administrative Council: Kenneth Warfield
  - Vice Chairman of Administrative Council: Blake Heyder
  - Deputy Chair of Administrative Council: Harry Ball-Zucker

Area
  - Total: 0.14 sq mi (0.35 km^{2})
  - Land: 0.14 sq mi (0.35 km^{2})
  - Water: 0 sq mi (0.00 km^{2})
- Elevation: 1,184 ft (361 m)

Population (2020)
  - Total: 127
  - Density: 939.8/sq mi (362.87/km^{2})
- Time zone: UTC-5 (Eastern (EST))
  - Summer (DST): UTC-4 (EDT)
- FIPS code: 39-53480
- GNIS feature ID: 2399433

Mutual is a village in Champaign County, Ohio, United States. The population was 127 at the 2020 census.

== History ==
Mutual was laid out in the 1840s and incorporated as a village in 1869.

== Geography ==
Mutual is located at the intersection of State Routes 29 and 161. The nearest stream is Buck Creek, a tributary of the Mad River, which flows about 1 mile (1½ km) west of the community. It is located approximately midway between the city of Urbana (the county seat of Champaign County) and the village of Mechanicsburg.

According to the United States Census Bureau, the village has a total area of 0.13 square miles (0.34 km^{2}), all of it land.

== Demographics ==
Historical population
Census	Pop.	Note	%±
1880	189		—
1890	174		−7.9%
1900	163		−6.3%
1910	134		−17.8%
1920	157		17.2%
1930	129		−17.8%
1940	120		−7.0%
1950	178		48.3%
1960	163		−8.4%
1970	177		8.6%
1980	159		−10.2%
1990	126		−20.8%
2000	132		4.8%
2010	104		−21.2%
2020	127		22.1%
U.S. Decennial Census

=== 2010 census ===
As of the census of 2010, there were 104 people, 48 households, and 32 families living in the village. The population density was 800.0 inhabitants per square mile (308.9/km^{2}). There were 54 housing units at an average density of 415.4 per square mile (160.4/km^{2}). The racial makeup of the village was 97.1% White and 2.9% African American.

There were 48 households, of which 25.0% had children under the age of 18 living with them, 52.1% were married couples living together, 6.3% had a female householder with no husband present, 8.3% had a male householder with no wife present, and 33.3% were non-families. 29.2% of all households were made up of individuals, and 23% had someone living alone who was 65 years of age or older. The average household size was 2.17 and the average family size was 2.69.

The median age in the village was 45.5 years. 23.1% of residents were under the age of 18; 1.9% were between the ages of 18 and 24; 24.1% were from 25 to 44; 25% were from 45 to 64; and 26% were 65 years of age or older. The gender makeup of the village was 51.0% male and 49.0% female.

=== 2000 census ===
As of the census of 2000, there were 132 people, 51 households, and 39 families living in the village. The population density was 969.6 inhabitants per square mile (374.4/km^{2}). There were 51 housing units at an average density of 374.6 per square mile (144.6/km^{2}). The racial makeup of the village was 100.00% White. Hispanic or Latino of any race were 1.52% of the population.

There were 51 households, out of which 37.3% had children under the age of 18 living with them, 70.6% were married couples living together, 5.9% had a female householder with no husband present, and 21.6% were non-families. 19.6% of all households were made up of individuals, and 13.7% had someone living alone who was 65 years of age or older. The average household size was 2.59 and the average family size was 2.90.

In the village, the population was spread out, with 23.5% under the age of 18, 6.8% from 18 to 24, 35.6% from 25 to 44, 18.9% from 45 to 64, and 15.2% who were 65 years of age or older. The median age was 37 years. For every 100 females there were 73.7 males. For every 100 females age 18 and over, there were 77.2 males.

The median income for a household in the village was $50,000, and the median income for a family was $51,875. Males had a median income of $30,750 versus $23,750 for females. The per capita income for the village was $16,722. There were no families and 1.0% of the population living below the poverty line, including no under eighteens and 14.3% of those over 64.
