= Ohio State Route 710 =

State highway in Franklin County, Ohio, US

State Route 710

Route information
- Maintained by ODOT
- Length: 4.06 mi (6.53 km)
- Existed: 1969–present

Major junctions
- West end: SR 161 in Columbus
- East end: I-270 in Columbus

Location
- Country: United States
- State: Ohio
- Counties: Franklin

Highway system
- Ohio State Highway System; Interstate; US; State; Scenic
← SR 709	→ SR 711

State Route 710 (SR 710) is a 4.06-mile-long (6.53 km) state highway in the central portion of the U.S. state of Ohio. Existing entirely within the northern portion of the city of Columbus, SR 710 begins at an intersection with SR 161, less than one-quarter mile (0.40 km) west of exit 117 off Interstate 71 (I-71). The highway ends at a seven-ramp partial cloverleaf interchange with I-270 at its exit 27.

SR 710 was established in 1969. Although signed as an east–west route, the overall path of this route is that of an irregularly shaped inverted "U", with its westernmost and easternmost portions following north–south roadways.

== Route description ==
Traffic volume on State Route 710
County Log Point	Volume
0.114	19,270
0.92	8,050
1.37	15,590
3.4	23,240
3.557	47,300
Volume: AADT; Source:

The entire length of SR 710 lies within the northern portion of Franklin County, and entirely within the city limits of Columbus. SR 710 starts at SR 161. The first part of SR 710 is located in Busch Boulevard, a north–south road. SR 710's western terminus is located in Busch, a business area. Later, Busch Boulevard ends and SR 710 turns east to Schrock Road and later makes a turn south to Cleveland Avenue, another north–south road. Here, SR 710 makes up the border of Northgate, a residential area. The route ends at a seven-ramp partial cloverleaf interchange with I-270 that features loop ramps in all but the northwestern quadrant.

== History ==
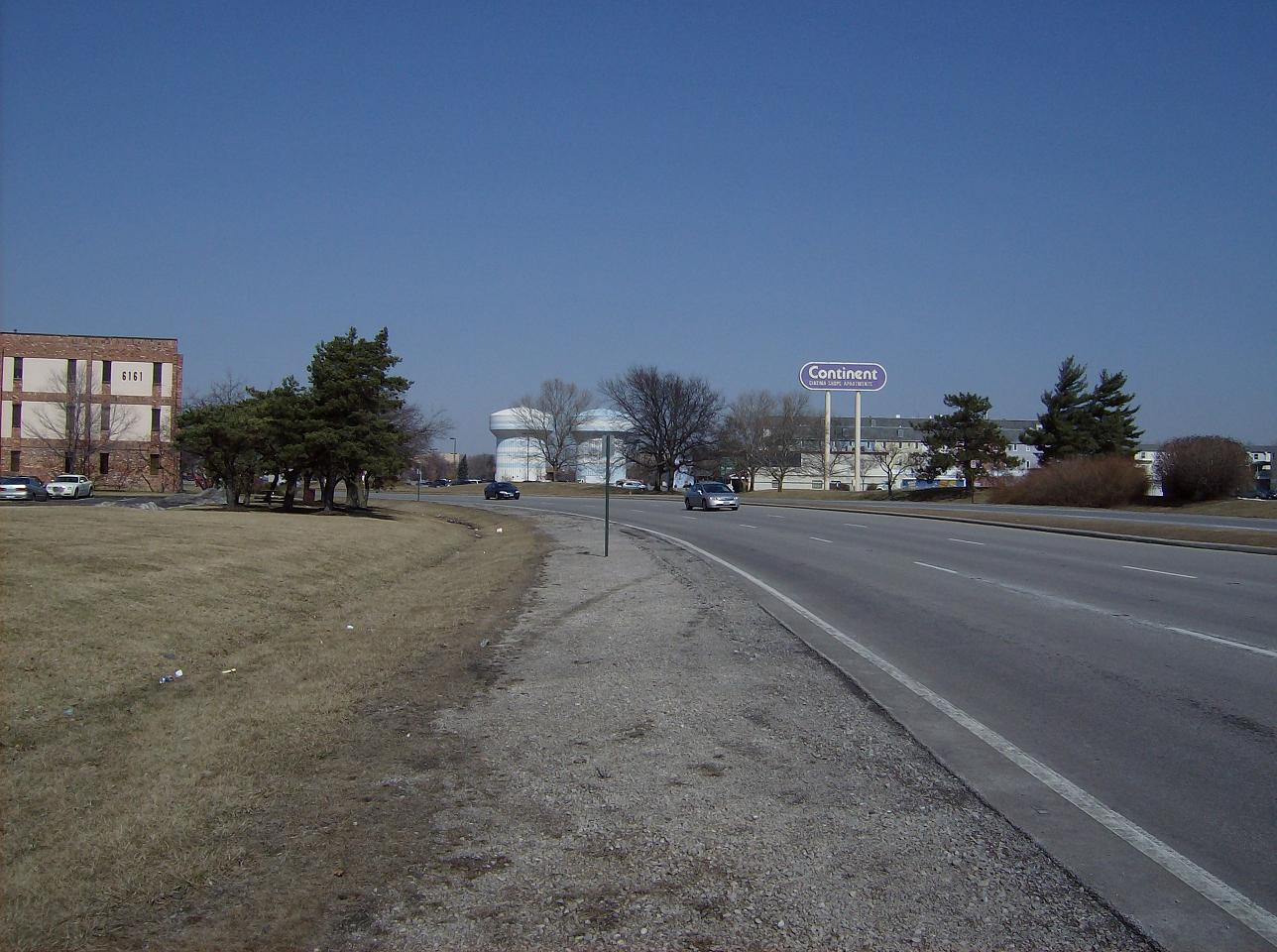
Along SR 710 near the intersection with SR 161

The SR 710 designation was applied in 1969. Since its inception, it has utilized the same alignment between SR 161 and I-270 in the northern portion of Columbus.

== Major intersections ==
The entire route is in Columbus, Franklin County.

mi	km	Destinations	Notes
0.00	0.00	SR 161 (East Dublin–Granville Road) to North Meadows Boulevard / I-71	
3.59– 4.06	5.78– 6.53	I-270 (Jack Nicklaus Freeway) to Cleveland Avenue / I-71	Exit 27 on I-270
1.000 mi = 1.609 km; 1.000 km = 0.621 mi
