= Ohio State Route 161 =

East-west state highway in central Ohio, US

State Route 161

Route information
- Maintained by ODOT
- Length: 57.804 mi (93.027 km)
- Existed: 1924–present
- Tourist routes: Big Darby Plains Scenic Byway

Major junctions
- West end: SR 29 in Mutual
- US 42 in Plain City; US 33 in Dublin; I-270 in Dublin; US 23 in Worthington; I-71 in Columbus; I-270 near Minerva Park; US 62 in New Albany
- East end: SR 37 near Alexandria

Location
- Country: United States
- State: Ohio
- Counties: Champaign, Union, Madison, Franklin, Licking

Highway system
- Ohio State Highway System; Interstate; US; State; Scenic
← SR 160	→ SR 162

State Route 161 (SR 161) is an east–west state highway in central Ohio. Its western terminus is in Mutual at State Route 29 and its eastern terminus is near Alexandria at State Route 37. It is 57.46 miles (92.47 km) long. State Route 161 passes through the northern parts of Columbus, Ohio's state capital, and a variety of towns including Plain City, Dublin, and New Albany.

The route was established in 1924 to connect Plain City and Dublin. It was later expanded to cover Mutual and Granville. Parts of SR 161 in Dublin and New Albany were upgraded to a freeway in 1969 and 1997.

== Route description ==
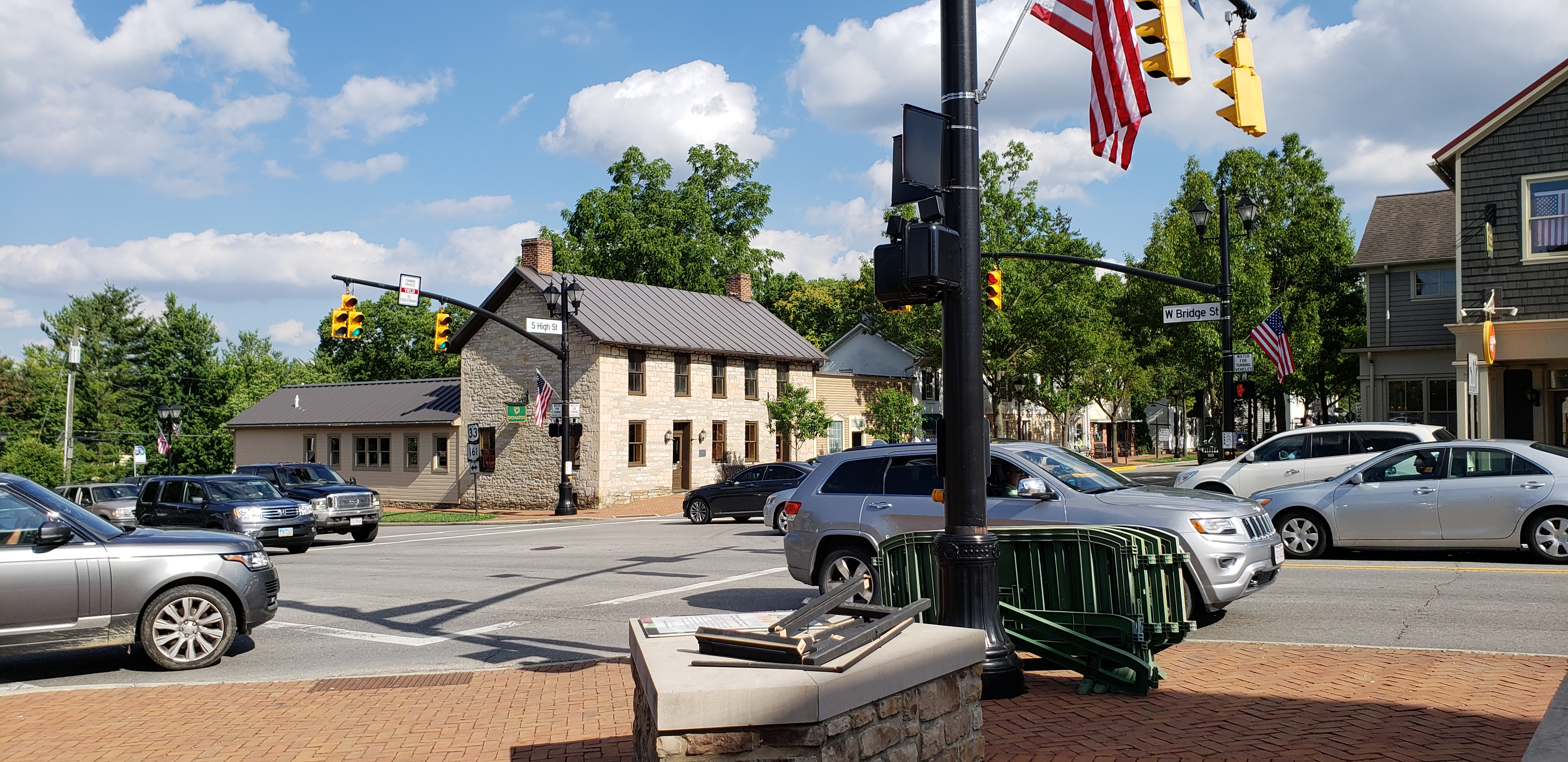
SR 161 and SR 745 in Dublin

SR 161 starts off in Mutual as Milford Road, at a T-intersection at SR 29. The road turns northeast and later meets SR 559 and Bullard Rutan Road in a 5-point intersection. Two miles (3.2 km) later, a concurrency begins with SR 4. One mile (1.6 km) later, the concurrency ends with SR 4 continuing to move north. About five miles (8.0 km) later, SR 38 starts a very short concurrency at Chuckery. After Chuckery, SR 38 splits off. There are no more major intersections until SR 161 reaches Plain City, where it meets U.S. Route 42 (US 42). SR 161 goes through Madison and a small section of Franklin County without major intersections. In Union County, it meets US 33 and Post Road in an interchange. SR 161 goes on the freeway and starts a concurrency. The concurrency goes back into Franklin County and into Dublin. In Dublin, the freeway has interchanges with Avery–Muirfield Drive and Interstate 270 (I-270). The freeway becomes an at-grade highway as it meets Post Road again.

The road goes into Dublin downtown and has intersections with SR 745 and SR 257. At SR 257, US 33 splits off and the concurrency ends. After that, there are no more major intersections until SR 161 reaches Worthington, as it meets SR 315 in a diamond interchange, and US 23 at an at-grade intersection. After the intersection at US 23, SR 161 enters Columbus. There is an intersection with SR 710 and an interchange with I-71. Three miles (4.8 km) later, in Minerva Park, SR 161 becomes a limited access freeway. The first exit is SR 3, a partial cloverleaf interchange with service roads. One mile (1.6 km) later, SR 161 re-enters Columbus and meets I-270 again in a modified cloverleaf interchange. There is a SPUI-parclo hybrid interchange at Sunbury Road, and an incomplete interchange for Little Turtle Way, a half of a diamond interchange. The next two interchanges, Hamilton Road and New Albany Road, uses diamond interchanges. SR 161 enters New Albany, and has two interchanges with US 62, in Franklin County, and Beech Road, in Licking County. Then it exits New Albany and enters St. Albans Township. In the township, SR 161 has two diamond interchanges with SR 310 and SR 37. SR 161 ends at SR 37. SR 161 is part of the Big Darby Plains scenic byway. The parts of the route that are included in the byway are from Homer Road to Rosedale Road and from Kramer Road to US 33.

== History ==
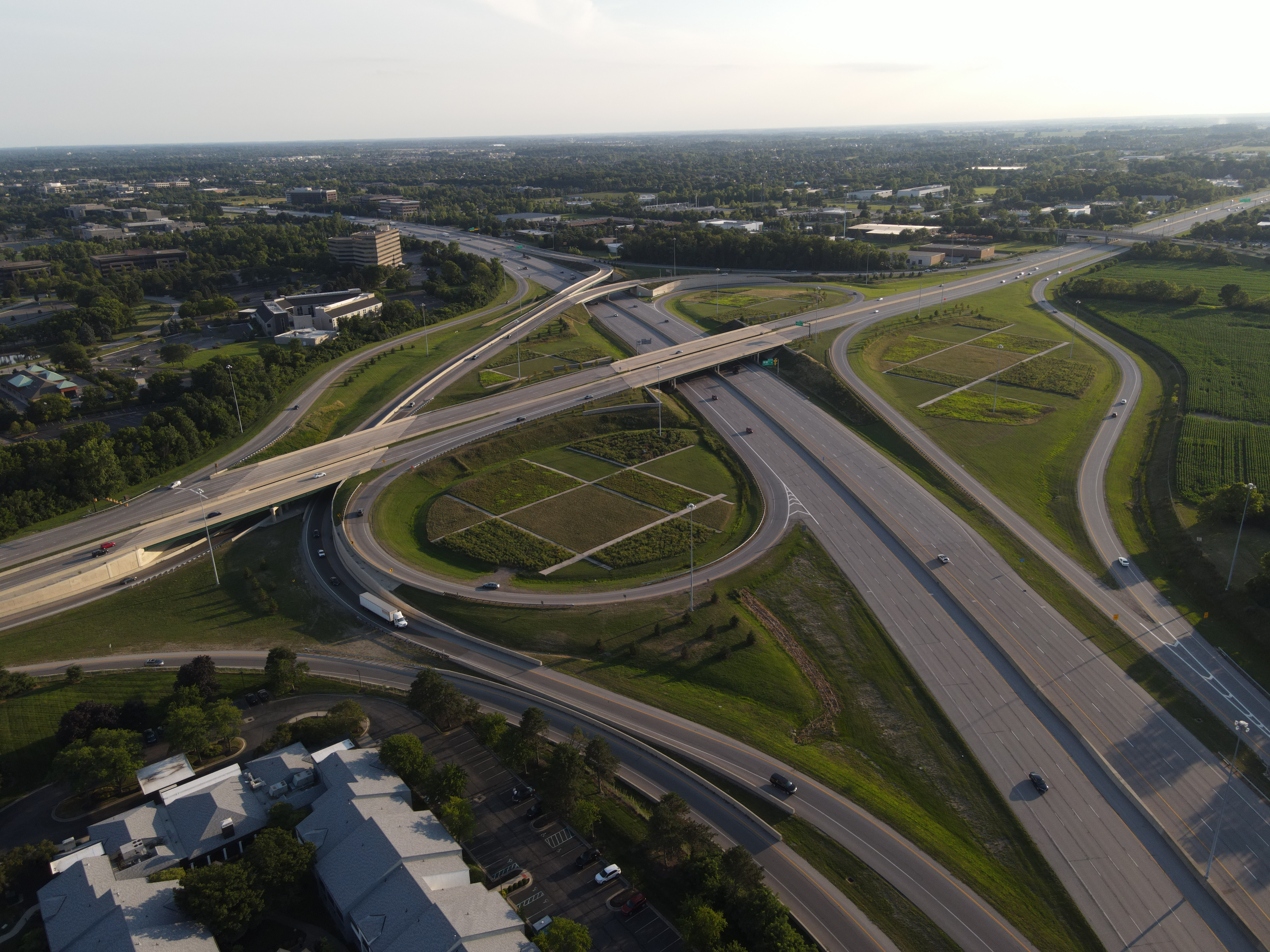
State Route 161's western interchange with Interstate 270 near Dublin

SR 161 was designated in 1924, as a connection from Plain City to Dublin. Its east end was a junction with SR 21, five miles (8.0 km) west of Dublin. It was later expanded to include an unnumbered section between Mutual and Plain City, and Dublin and Granville. In 1938, a concurrency from five miles (8.0 km) west of Dublin to the city itself was changed from SR 31 to US 33. Much later, in 1969, the five-mile (8.0 km) section in Dublin was upgraded to a freeway. Seven years later, the section between I-71 and Sunbury Road was upgraded to a divided highway. In 1997, a bypass was created around New Albany, from I-270 to a point two miles (3.2 km) east of it. SR 161's route was changed to use the bypass, no longer intersecting New Albany's downtown area. The project was completed in 2000. On June 14, 2004, Ohio Department of Transportation began the Northeast Expressway Transformation, replacing 17 bridges, 18 ramps, and 5 miles (8.0 km) of highway. The project finished in 2008. The freeway in New Albany was extended to SR 37, SR 161's eastern terminus. New interchanges and solutions were designed for the interchanges with I-270 and Avery-Muirfield Drive in Dublin, studies started for the interchanges in 2011 and phase one of the project started in 2014.

== Junction list ==
County	Location	mi	km	Exit	Destinations	Notes
Champaign	Mutual	0.000	0.000		SR 29	Western terminus
Champaign	Goshen Township	5.403	8.695		SR 559	
Champaign	Goshen Township	7.105	11.434		SR 4 south	Western end of SR 4 concurrency
Union	Union Township	8.531	13.729		SR 4 north	Eastern end of SR 4 concurrency
Union	Union Township	14.021	22.565		SR 38 south	Western end of SR 38 concurrency
Union	Darby Township	14.211	22.870		SR 38 north	Eastern end of SR 38 concurrency
Union	Plain City	20.451	32.913		US 42 (Jefferson Avenue)	
Madison	No major junctions					
Franklin	No major junctions					
Union	Dublin	26.024	41.882	Western end of limited-access highway		
Union	Dublin	25.864– 26.024	41.624– 41.882	—	US 33 (Columbus–Marysville Road) / CR 24 (Post Road)	Western end of US 33 concurrency; exit 106 on US 33
Franklin	Dublin	27.334– 27.534	43.990– 44.312	107	CR 3 (Avery–Muirfield Drive)	Avery Road southbound, Muirfield Drive northbound
Franklin	Dublin	28.344– 28.874	45.615– 46.468	108	I-270 (Jack Nicklaus Freeway)	I-270 Exit 17A-B; US 33 / SR 161 is freeway west of here
Franklin	Dublin	28.874	46.468	Eastern end of limited-access freeway		
Franklin	Dublin	29.734	47.852		SR 745 north (High Street)	Southern terminus of SR 745; center of "Olde Dublin"
Franklin	Dublin	29.924– 30.024	48.158– 48.319		US 33 south (Riverside Drive) / SR 257 north	Eastern end of US 33 concurrency, southern terminus of SR 257
Franklin	Worthington	33.974– 34.084	54.676– 54.853		SR 315 (Moody Jackson Parkway)	Diamond interchange
Franklin	Worthington	35.024	56.366		US 23 (North High Street)	At-grade intersection
Franklin	Columbus	36.364	58.522		SR 710 (Busch Boulevard)	Western terminus of SR 710
Franklin	Columbus	36.514– 36.734	58.764– 59.118		I-71	Exit 117 on I-71
Franklin	Blendon Township	39.924– 40.074	64.251– 64.493	39	CR 7004 / CR 7005 to SR 3 (Westerville Road)	Access via folded diamond interchange and service roads.
Franklin	Blendon Township			Western end of limited-access freeway		
Franklin	Blendon Township–Columbus line	40.694– 42.374	65.491– 68.194	40	I-270 (Jack Nicklaus Freeway)	Signed as exits 40A (south) & 40B (north) eastbound; exit 30 on I-270
Franklin	Blendon Township–Columbus line	41.404– 41.924	66.633– 67.470	41	CR 8 (Sunbury Road)	SPUI and half-cloverleaf combined interchange
Franklin	Columbus	41.884– 42.104	67.406– 67.760	42	CR 7004 (Little Turtle Way)	Old SR 161 follows Dublin–Granville Road east of this interchange; No entrance from SR 161 westbound and no re-entrance to eastbound
Franklin	Columbus	43.624– 44.094	70.206– 70.962	43	CR 103F (Hamilton Road)	
Franklin	Columbus	45.394– 45.914	73.055– 73.891	45	CR 613 (New Albany Road)	
Franklin	New Albany	46.824– 47.194	75.356– 75.951	46	US 62 (Johnstown Road)	
Licking	New Albany	49.254– 49.984	79.267– 80.441	—	TR 88 (Beech Road)	
Licking	Jersey Township	51.244	82.469	51	CR 41 (Mink Street)	
Licking	Jersey–St. Albans township line	53.844– 54.624	86.654– 87.909	—	SR 310 (Hazelton–Etna Road) – Pataskala, Johnstown	
Licking	St. Albans Township	57.204– 57.804	92.061– 93.027	—	SR 37 (Johnstown–Alexandria Road) – Johnstown	Eastern terminus
1.000 mi = 1.609 km; 1.000 km = 0.621 mi: Concurrency terminus; Incomplete access

== State Route 161J ==
State Route 161J
- Location: Licking County, Ohio
- Length: 5.80 mi (9.33 km)
- Existed: 2008–by 2013

An unsigned state route named SR 161J previously existed in Licking County. It consisted of the former section of SR 161 before it was rerouted onto the nearby freeway. Beginning at a dead end near the SR 161–Beech Road interchange, it traveled east along Worthington Road and ended at Watkins Road (TR 42). It intersected SR 310, but never met SR 161. The route suffix "J" meant that the road was "awaiting abandonment". The route was ultimately abandoned by the state in 2013.
