= Jeriah Swetland =

American politician

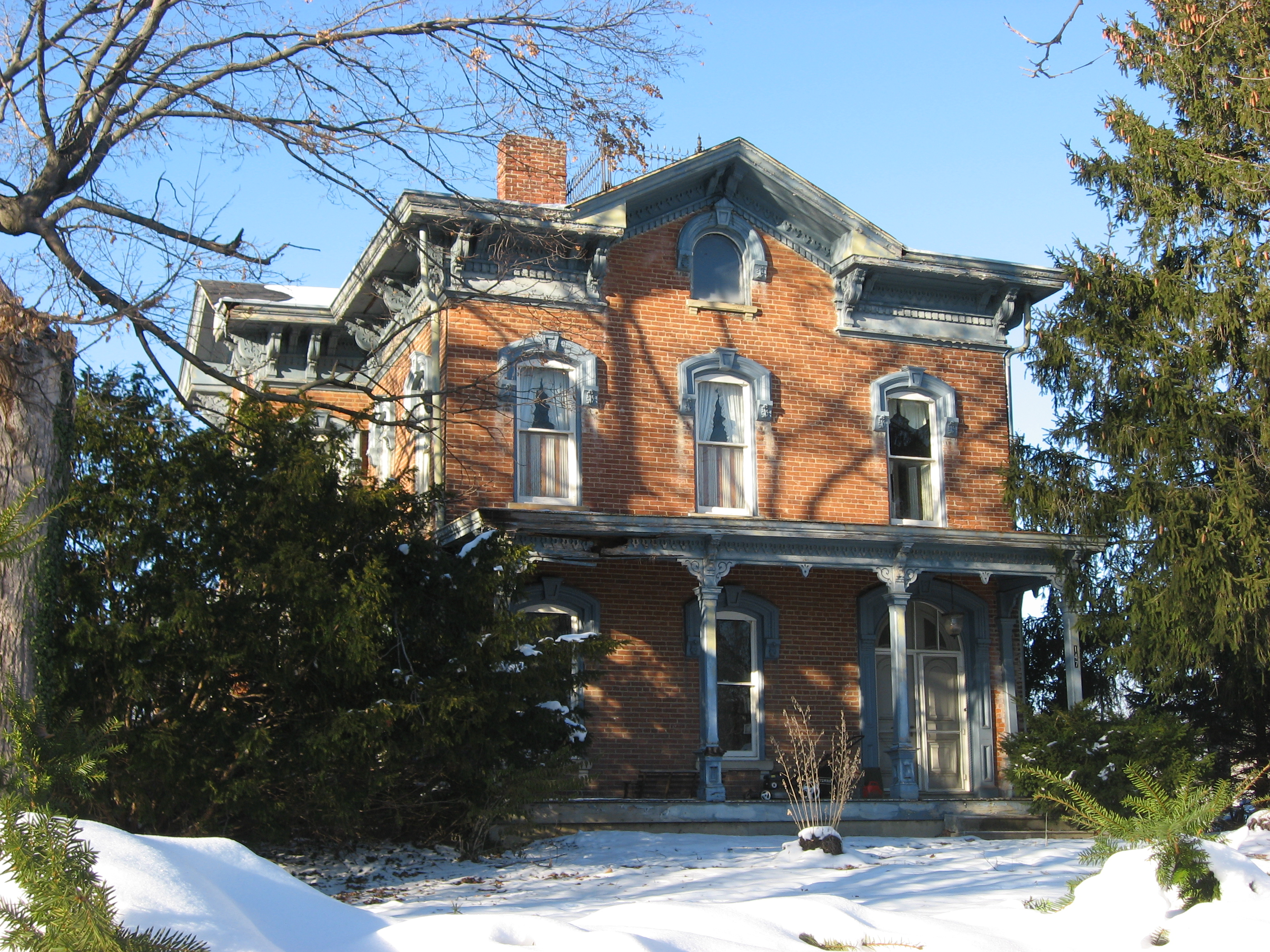
Swetland's house in London

Jeriah Swetland (April 1817–November 24, 1906) was an American businessman and local politician in nineteenth-century central Ohio.

A native of Springfield, New Hampshire, Swetland was the ninth of ten children born to Roswell and Naomi (Rockwell) Swetland. At the age of nineteen, he left home for an apprenticeship in the harnessmaking and saddlemaking trades. On May 23, 1841, he married the former Arabella Fellows, who bore him three children. Two years later, he left New Hampshire to settle in London, Ohio, where he began to conduct business; between 1847 and 1856, he moved at various times to Pickaway County, Mount Sterling, and again to London, where he joined in partnership with William Chandler for a ten-year period.

Swetland was a prominent part of the society of London; he joined its Masonic lodge in 1850, and he was a member of the Knights of Pythias and a leader in the Knights Templar. After a time of service on London's village council, he was elected as a Democrat to the Ohio House of Representatives, serving from 1867 to 1869. He and his wife were active members of the local congregation of the Methodist Episcopal Church.

In 1871, Swetland and his wife built a house on London's east side; known as the Swetland House in the present day, it is listed on the National Register of Historic Places.

Swetland died on November 24, 1906, in London from uremic poisoning. He was 89.
