= First United Methodist Church (London, Ohio) =

Historic church in Ohio, United States

- U.S. National Register of Historic Places
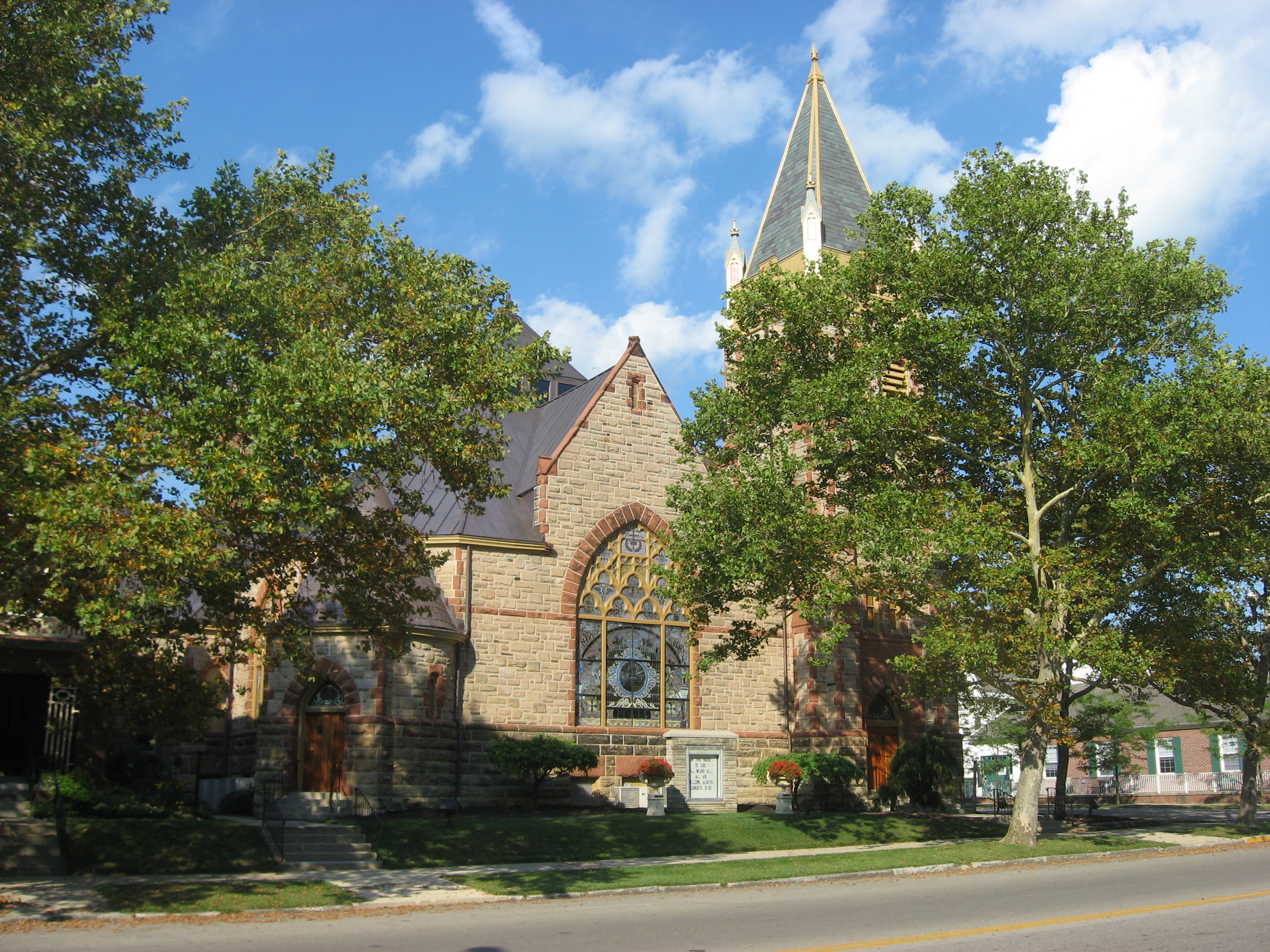
- Front of the church

- Location within Ohio Location within the United States
- Location: 52 N. Main St., London, Ohio
- Coordinates: 39°53′14″N 83°26′59″W
- Area: less than one acre
- Built: 1894
- Architect: Crapsey & Brown; A.A. Fletcher, & Co.
- Architectural style: Gothic Revival and Jacobean Revival
- NRHP reference No.: 96000930
- Added to NRHP: August 22, 1996

First United Methodist Church is a historic congregation of the United Methodist Church in downtown London, Ohio, United States. Founded in London's earliest years, the congregation worships in a historic church building that was built in the 1890s.

== Congregational history ==
A small group of individuals formed a congregation of the Methodist Episcopal Church in 1813 or 1814, very soon after London was platted. In its earliest years, the society's members worshipped in each other's homes, and preaching was rare; London's church was part of a circuit of twenty-four Methodist preaching stations. In 1820, the congregation built a log church building on a downtown corner lot; it was the first church building in London. After twenty years, the congregation decided to move. Obtaining property a few blocks away, they built a larger frame church, 60 feet (18 m) on each side, and a brick parsonage.

During the 1860s, the congregation saw many changes. In 1860, the pastor's responsibilities were reduced; except for Kingsley Chapel, a small church near London, he was no longer assigned to serve any churches other than London, and Kingsley later closed. The same year saw the completion of a new brick church building, which was placed on the site of the frame church building; measuring 90 feet (27 m) by 40 feet (12 m), it cost $7,500 to build. Other buildings were erected in the following few years: a new parsonage was completed in 1863, and a small chapel was added to the church's rear in 1866 by the gift of a member.

Among the congregation's leading past members was Jeriah Swetland, prominent local businessman and state representative.

== Church building ==
Continued growth produced a need for a fourth church building, and the third building was sold in the early 1890s. Buying a house at 52 N. Main Street, the congregation moved it to a nearby empty lot and renovated it for use as a parsonage. With the house's original location now empty, a larger church was erected on the site. At the time of its dedication on November 18, 1894, it had cost $45,000 to build. This church remains in use to the present day. Designed by the architectural firm of Crapsey and Brown, it was built in a combination of the Gothic Revival and Jacobean Revival architectural styles. The church's brick and sandstone walls rests on a foundation of sandstone; they are topped with an asphalt roof, and the building is decorated with wooden and glass elements.

== Recognition ==
In 1996, First United Methodist was listed on the National Register of Historic Places because of its well-preserved historic architecture.

Today, First United Methodist is a part of the Capitol Area South District of the West Ohio Conference of the United Methodist Church. As of 2026, it is served by Pastor David Leckrone and Youth Director Katelyn Hannah.
