= Valentine Wilson House =

Historic house in Ohio, United States

- U.S. National Register of Historic Places
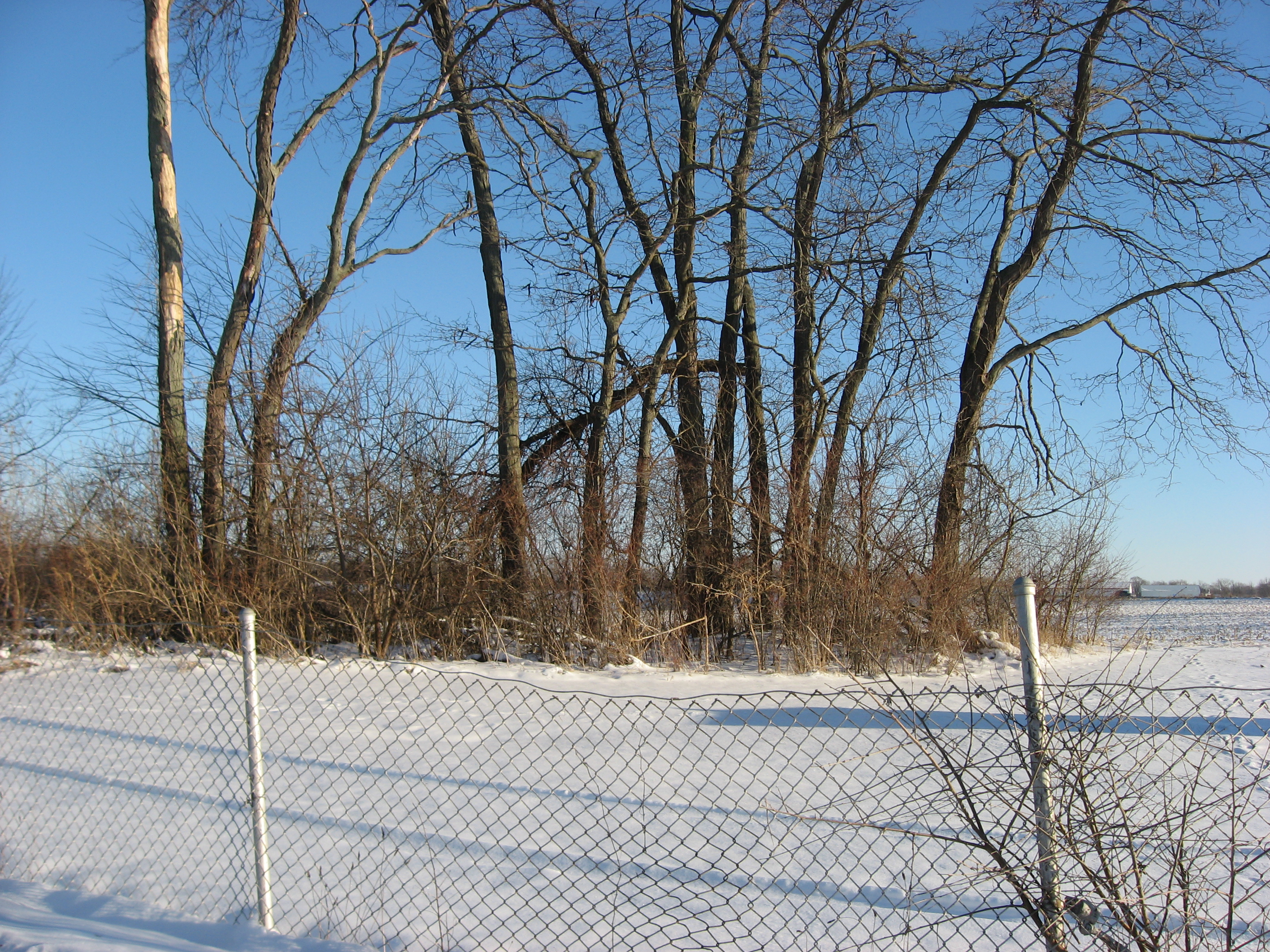
- Site of the Wilson House

- Location within Ohio Location within the United States
- Nearest city: Summerford, Ohio
- Coordinates: 39°56′35″N 83°30′21″W
- Area: 0.6 acres (0.24 ha)
- Built: 1820
- NRHP reference No.: 73001505
- Added to NRHP: May 22, 1973

The Valentine Wilson House was a historic residence in Madison County, Ohio, United States. Located off Interstate 70 about 1 mile (1.6 km) north of Summerford, it was the home of pioneer Valentine Wilson.

Born in Harpers Ferry, Virginia in 1785, he moved with his family to Kentucky in 1790 and to Ohio in 1802; they settled in Greene County, where he married the former Eleanor Judy in 1806. In 1816, the Wilson family moved to Madison County and purchased land along the trail that later became the National Road; here, Valentine quickly became a prosperous farmer. Besides tilling the soil, he engaged in industry, establishing the county's first brickyard. His excellent presence of mind and understanding of other men's intentions enabled him to build and preserve his wealth: upon one occasion, he was accosted by highwaymen while carrying $7,000 on his person, but he kept his money by calmly telling the robbers only of the small coin that he carried in his pocket. By the time of his death, he had expanded his farm from its original 160 acres (65 ha) to about 7,000 acres (2,800 ha), and his personal property was worth another $60,000, including 1,000 sheep and cattle. He was by far the wealthiest man in Madison County at the time.

Wilson built his home in 1820 on the northern side of the future National Road. Constructed of brick and wood, it was a two-part structure: the main portion of the house was a two-story brick hall-and-parlor design, while later additions were single-story structures that combined brick and wood. Into the late twentieth century, it remained little unchanged and retained the sense of an elaborate early nineteenth-century farmhouse far more strongly than many slightly later residences, which generally were erected with heavy vernacular influences.

In 1973, the Valentine Wilson House was listed on the National Register of Historic Places. Key to its inclusion was its well preserved architecture, which included such elements as fine original details. It was the first place in Madison County to be accorded this distinction, but designation as a historic site has not succeeded in ensuring its survival: the house has since been destroyed.
