= Swetland House =

Historic house in Ohio, United States

- U.S. National Register of Historic Places
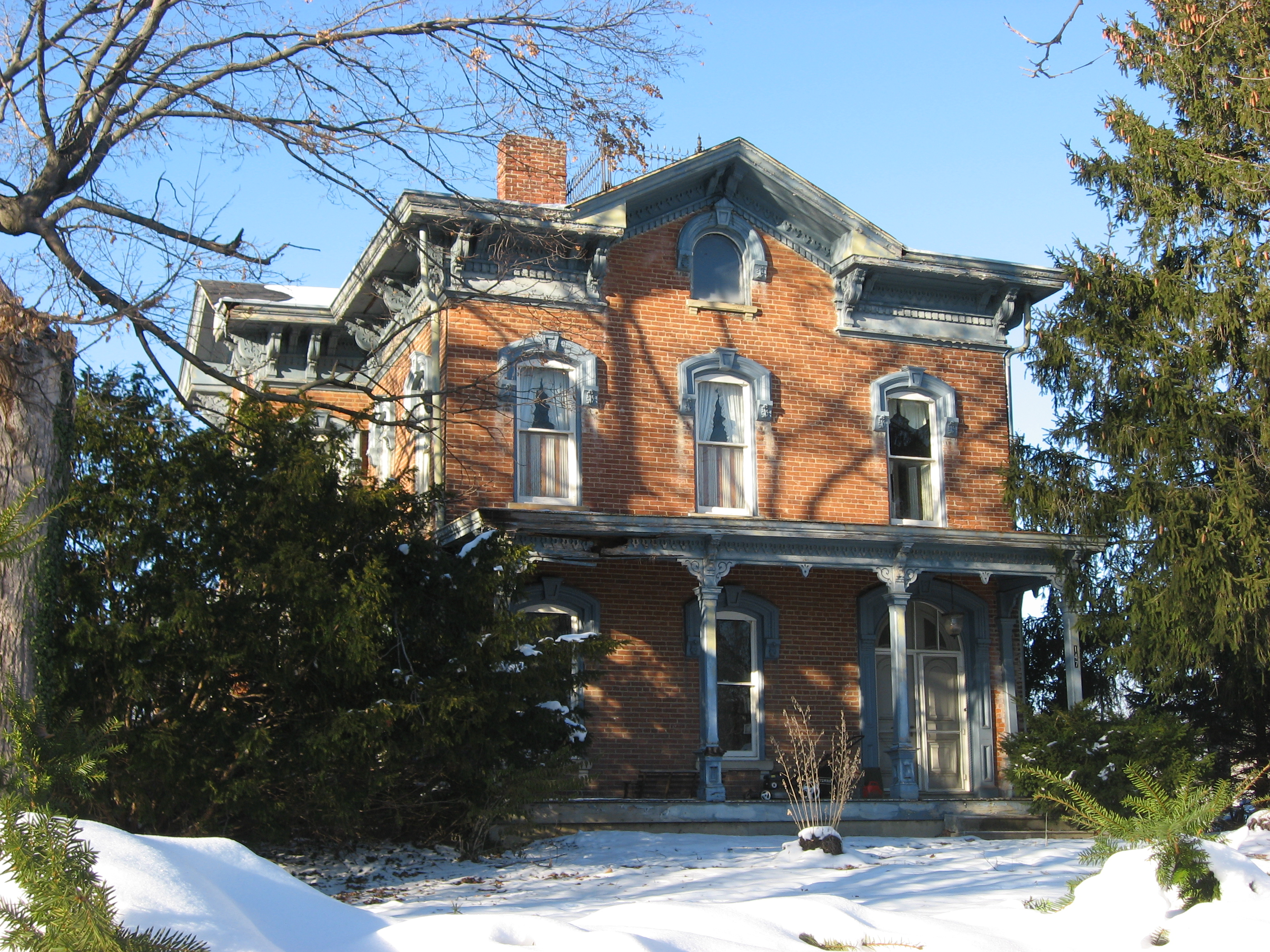
- Front of the house

- Location within Ohio Location within the United States
- Location: 147 E. High St., London, Ohio
- Coordinates: 39°53′21″N 83°26′39″W
- Area: Less than 1 acre (0.40 ha)
- Built: 1871
- Architectural style: Italianate
- NRHP reference No.: 83002007
- Added to NRHP: January 11, 1983

The Swetland House is a historic residence in London, Ohio, United States. Built in 1871, it is one of the city's leading Italianate houses, and it was once home to one of London's leading citizens.

Jeriah Swetland passed through London in 1843 and settled there permanently in 1856. Founding a business with his brother-in-law, he quickly prospered; within a decade, he had become one of the city's richest men. In the late 1860s, he purchased a large tract of undeveloped land southeast of downtown London and platted it for resale; among the houses built in this area was his own, which was completed in 1871. Built of brick with an asphalt roof, the house features many clear Italianate elements, such as multiple bay windows, a hip roof, multiple verandahs, and ornate hoodmolds. Two-and-a-half stories tall, the house is divided into fourteen rooms.

For a time in the late twentieth century, the Swetland House was used as an arts center, the London Community Arts Center. In early 1983, the house was listed on the National Register of Historic Places, qualifying because of its connection to a leading local citizen and because of its distinctive historic architecture.
