= Plain City, Ohio =

Village in Madison and Union counties, Ohio, US

- Village
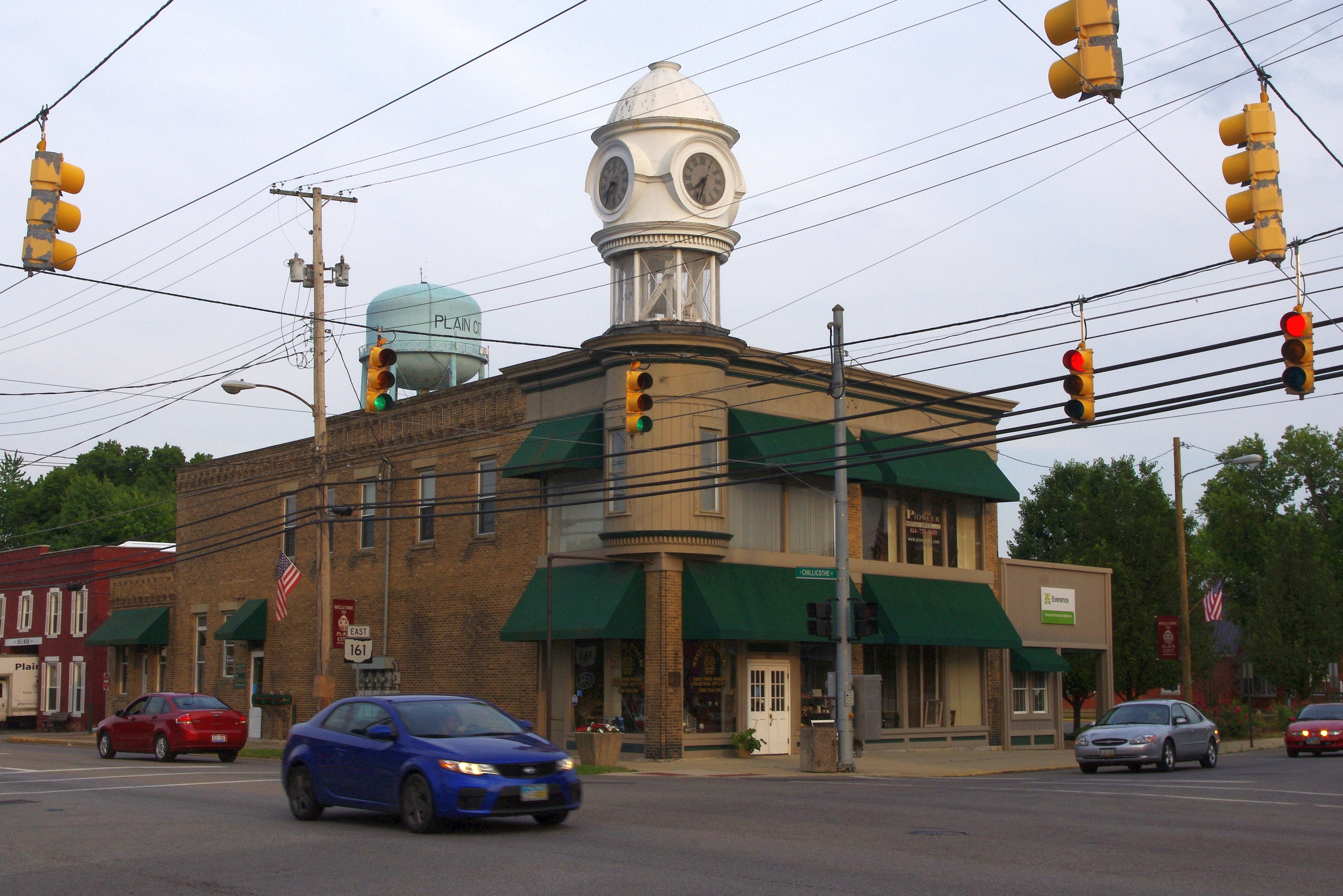
- Clock tower, 2013

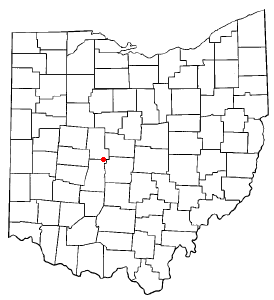
- Location of Plain City, Ohio

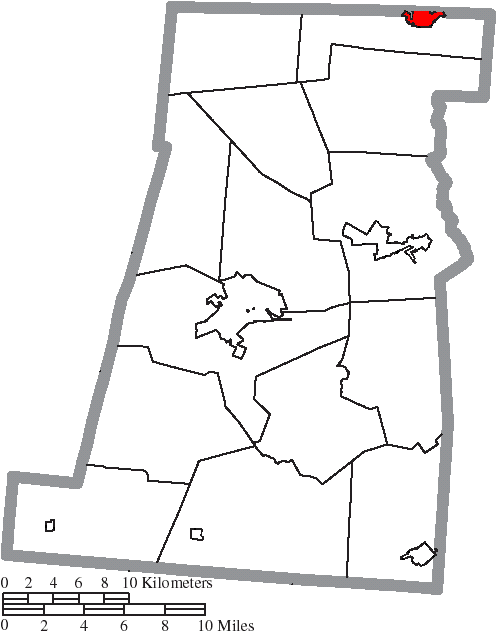
- Location of Plain City in Madison County
- Coordinates: 40°06′28″N 83°15′50″W
- Country: United States
- State: Ohio
- Counties: Madison, Union
- Townships: Darby, Jerome
- First platted: 1818 by Isaac Bigelow

Government
  - Type: Mayor-council-boards & commissions government
  - Mayor: Jody Carney

Area
  - Total: 2.78 sq mi (7.20 km^{2})
  - Land: 2.75 sq mi (7.13 km^{2})
  - Water: 0.027 sq mi (0.07 km^{2}) 1.2%
- Elevation: 932 ft (284 m)

Population (2020)
  - Total: 4,065
  - Density: 1,477.1/sq mi (570.32/km^{2})
- Time zone: UTC-5 (Eastern (EST))
  - Summer (DST): UTC-4 (EDT)
- ZIP code: 43064
- Area code: 614
- FIPS code: 39-63030
- GNIS feature ID: 2399682
- Website: Official website

Plain City is a village in Madison and Union counties in the U.S. state of Ohio, along the Big Darby Creek. The population was 4,065 at the 2020 census.

== History ==
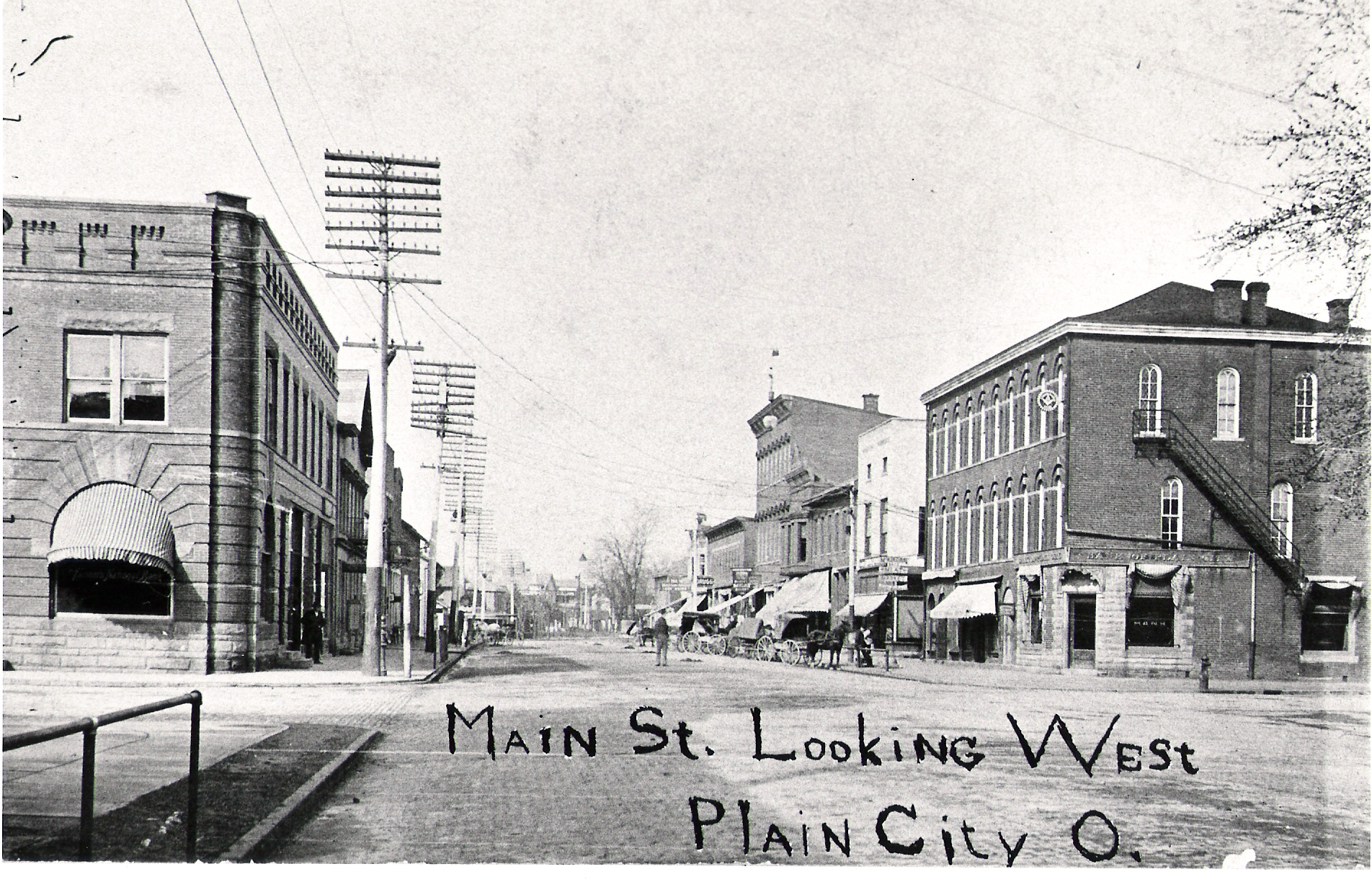
Downtown Plain City, 1906

Dedication of flag pole, 1917

Until about 1800, the Ohio Country was inhabited by Mingo and Wyandot Indians, and there was an Indian village just north of present-day Plain City. After 1795, as white settlers began moving into the region, the area around present-day Plain City was referred to as Pleasant Valley. This name remained in use into the 20th century, appearing in the Ohio Guide of the late Depression era.

In 1814, Isaac Bigelow travelled to the area from Centre County, Pennsylvania, to pay for land purchased from his uncle, then returned to Pennsylvania to study medicine with his father. He returned in 1817, and settled in the Pleasant Valley area in 1818. He hired a surveyor named David Chapman, and laid out the town of Westminster on June 11, 1818. At the time, Westminster lay wholly within Darby Township in Madison County. In 1820, when Union County was formed, the county line was moved to the middle of Westminster. In 1823, the previous survey was resurveyed, additional territory was incorporated, and the town's name was changed from Westminster to Pleasant Valley. From 1832 to 1851, there were six additions to the town limits. In 1851, due to there already being another town in Ohio named Pleasant Valley, the town changed its name to Plain City.

Prior to 1850, Plain City was a smaller trading point than Amity, but after a trunk-line for the Atlantic and Great Western Railroad was laid through its corporation limits, business and manufacturing increased dramatically. The corporation limits were extended in 1868. As of 1875, the town contained five churches, one newspaper, one bank, one brick planing mill, one flour mill, four dry goods stores, three drug stores, three grocery stores, one jewelry store, one hotel, one carriage and wagon store, two harness shops, two wagon shops, two blacksmith shops, and a boot and shoe store.

The Farmers National Bank, a building at the intersection of State Route 161 and Chillicothe Street, was built in 1902, and was listed on the National Register of Historic Places in 1995. The town clock, located at the same intersection, was dedicated on November 15, 1902.

An Amish settlement at Plain City that was founded in 1896 dissolved in 2011.

In 2024, Plain City was designated a Tree City USA.

== Geography ==
Plain City is located at the juncture of U.S. Route 42 and State Route 161, 8.9 miles (14.3 km) from Dublin and 11.3 miles (18.2 km) from Marysville.

According to the United States Census Bureau, the village has a total area of 2.40 square miles (6.22 km^{2}), of which 2.38 square miles (6.16 km^{2}) is land and 0.02 square miles (0.05 km^{2}) is water.

The Big Darby Creek flows through the village, forming parts of its village limits with Jerome Township, Union County and Darby Township, Madison County. McKitrick Park is located on the right bank of the Big Darby Creek in the Madison County half of the village.

The Sugar Run briefly flows through Plain City near the village's easternmost point.

== Demographics ==
Historical population
Census	Pop.	Note	%±
1880	908		—
1890	1,245		37.1%
1900	1,432		15.0%
1910	1,407		−1.7%
1920	1,330		−5.5%
1930	1,288		−3.2%
1940	1,385		7.5%
1950	1,715		23.8%
1960	2,146		25.1%
1970	2,254		5.0%
1980	2,102		−6.7%
1990	2,278		8.4%
2000	2,832		24.3%
2010	4,225		49.2%
2020	4,065		−3.8%
U.S. Decennial Census

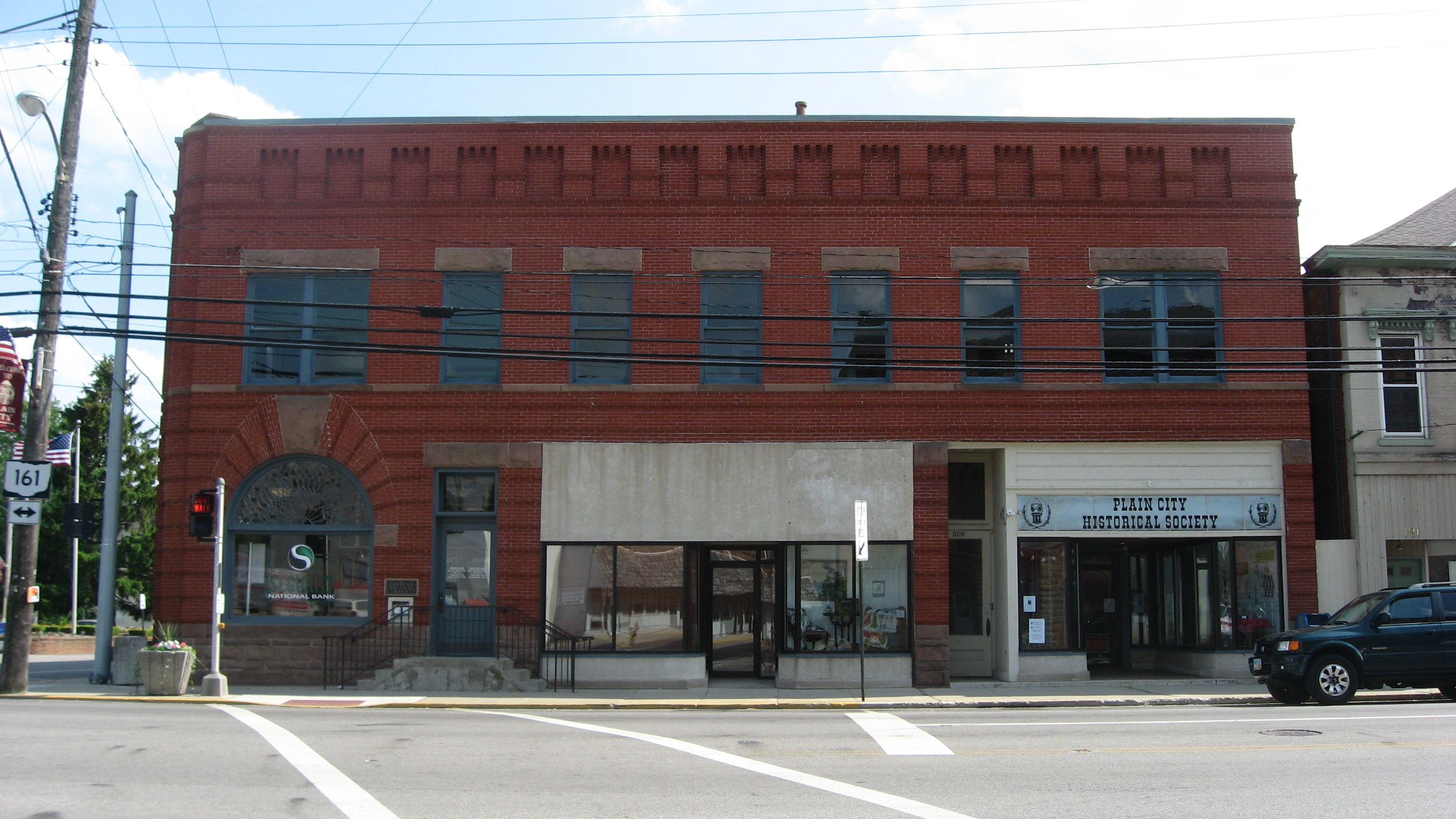
Farmers National Bank building, 2010

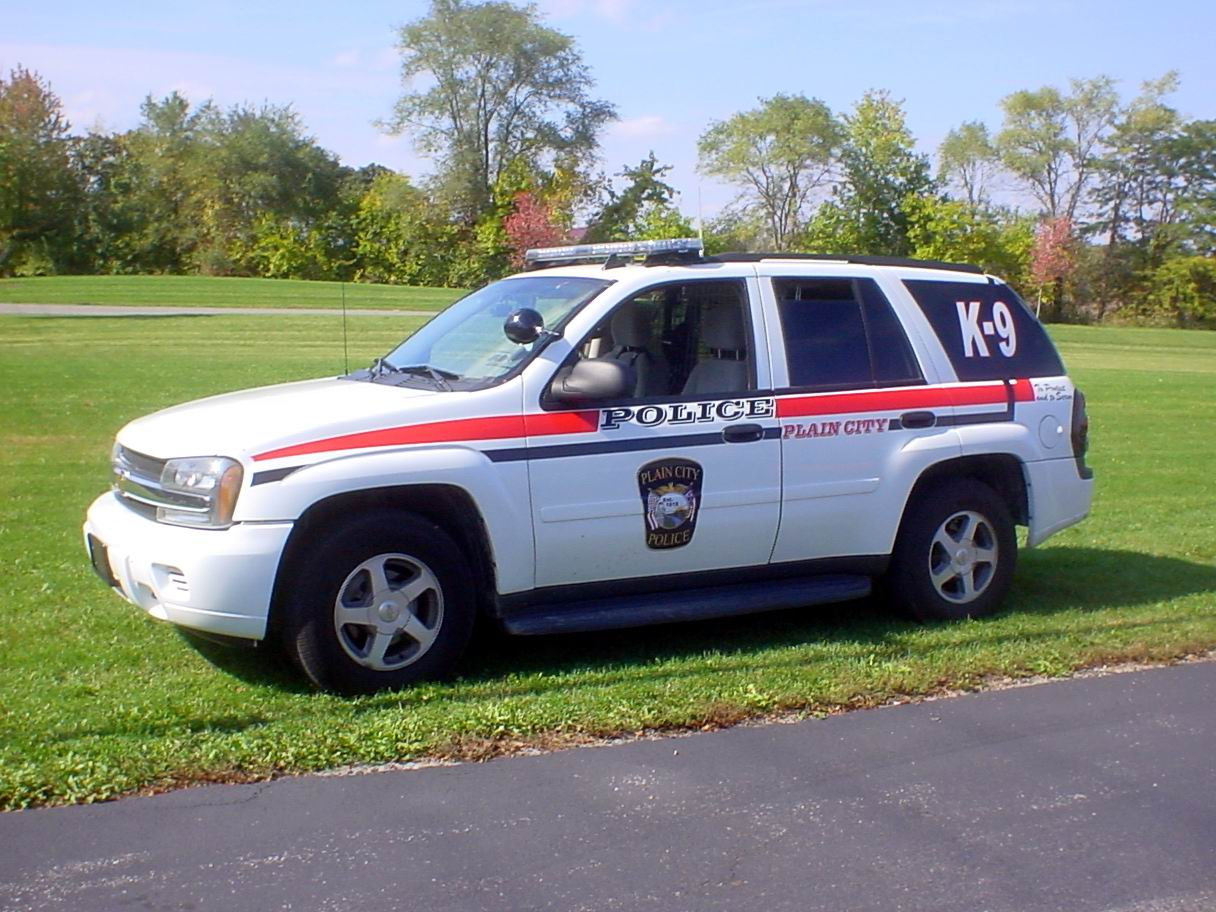
Plain City Police vehicle, 2009

The population of Plain City was about 700 in 1875, 1,245 in 1890, 1,432 in 1900, 1,407 in 1910, and about 1,500 in 1915.

=== 2020 census ===
As of the 2020 census, Plain City had a population of 4,065. The median age was 38.1 years. 26.2% of residents were under the age of 18 and 16.3% of residents were 65 years of age or older. For every 100 females there were 90.0 males, and for every 100 females age 18 and over there were 88.5 males age 18 and over.

0.0% of residents lived in urban areas, while 100.0% lived in rural areas.

There were 1,612 households in Plain City, of which 37.5% had children under the age of 18 living in them. Of all households, 52.2% were married-couple households, 14.5% were households with a male householder and no spouse or partner present, and 27.4% were households with a female householder and no spouse or partner present. About 28.1% of all households were made up of individuals and 15.0% had someone living alone who was 65 years of age or older.

There were 1,697 housing units, of which 5.0% were vacant. The homeowner vacancy rate was 1.1% and the rental vacancy rate was 4.3%.

Racial composition as of the 2020 census
Race	Number	Percent
White	3,762	92.5%
Black or African American	27	0.7%
American Indian and Alaska Native	7	0.2%
Asian	47	1.2%
Native Hawaiian and Other Pacific Islander	0	0.0%
Some other race	29	0.7%
Two or more races	193	4.7%
Hispanic or Latino (of any race)	75	1.8%

=== Demographic estimates ===
According to the 2019: ACS 5-Year Estimates Subject Tables, 94.6 percent of people above 25 in the village were at least a high school graduate or higher; and 35.6 percent of people had a bachelor's degree or higher as well.

=== 2010 census ===
As of the census of 2010, there were 4,225 people, 1,609 households, and 1,150 families living in the village. The population density was 1,775.2 inhabitants per square mile (685.4/km^{2}). There were 1,699 housing units at an average density of 713.9 units per square mile (275.6 units/km^{2}). The racial makeup of the village was 96.0% White, 0.6% African American, 0.7% Native American, 0.7% Asian, 0.2% from other races, and 1.9% from two or more races. Hispanic or Latino of any race were 1.5% of the population.

There were 1,609 households, of which 37.6% had children under the age of 18 living with them, 56.3% were married couples living together, 11.1% had a female householder with no husband present, 4.1% had a male householder with no wife present, and 28.5% were non-families. 25.4% of all households were made up of individuals, and 11.4% had someone living alone who was 65 years of age or older. The average household size was 2.63 and the average family size was 3.16.

The median age in the village was 37.2 years. 29.3% of residents were under the age of 18; 6.1% were between the ages of 18 and 24; 28.2% were from 25 to 44; 21.6% were from 45 to 64; and 14.8% were 65 years of age or older. The gender makeup of the village was 47.1% male and 52.9% female.

=== 2000 census ===
As of the census of 2000, there were 2,832 people, 1,128 households, and 753 families living in the village. The population density was 1,563.2 inhabitants per square mile (603.6/km^{2}). There were 1,201 housing units at an average density of 662.9 units per square mile (255.9 units/km^{2}). The racial makeup of the village was 96.93% White, 0.78% African American, 0.14% Native American, 0.28% Asian, 0.04% Pacific Islander, 0.74% from other races, and 1.09% from two or more races. Hispanic or Latino of any race were 1.20% of the population.

There were 1,128 households, out of which 36.6% had children under the age of 18 living with them, 51.6% were married couples living together, 10.9% had a female householder with no husband present, and 33.2% were non-families. 28.3% of all households were made up of individuals, and 12.1% had someone living alone who was 65 years of age or older. The average household size was 2.51 and the average family size was 3.10.

In the village, the population was spread out, with 28.0% under the age of 18, 7.8% from 18 to 24, 32.8% from 25 to 44, 18.8% from 45 to 64, and 12.6% who were 65 years of age or older. The median age was 34 years. For every 100 females there were 93.0 males. For every 100 females age 18 and over, there were 89.4 males.

The median income for a household in the village was $43,313, and the median income for a family was $51,007. Males had a median income of $35,382 versus $23,351 for females. The per capita income for the village was $20,815. About 4.3% of families and 6.1% of the population were below the poverty line, including 6.2% of those under age 18 and 11.1% of those age 65 or over.

== Arts and culture ==
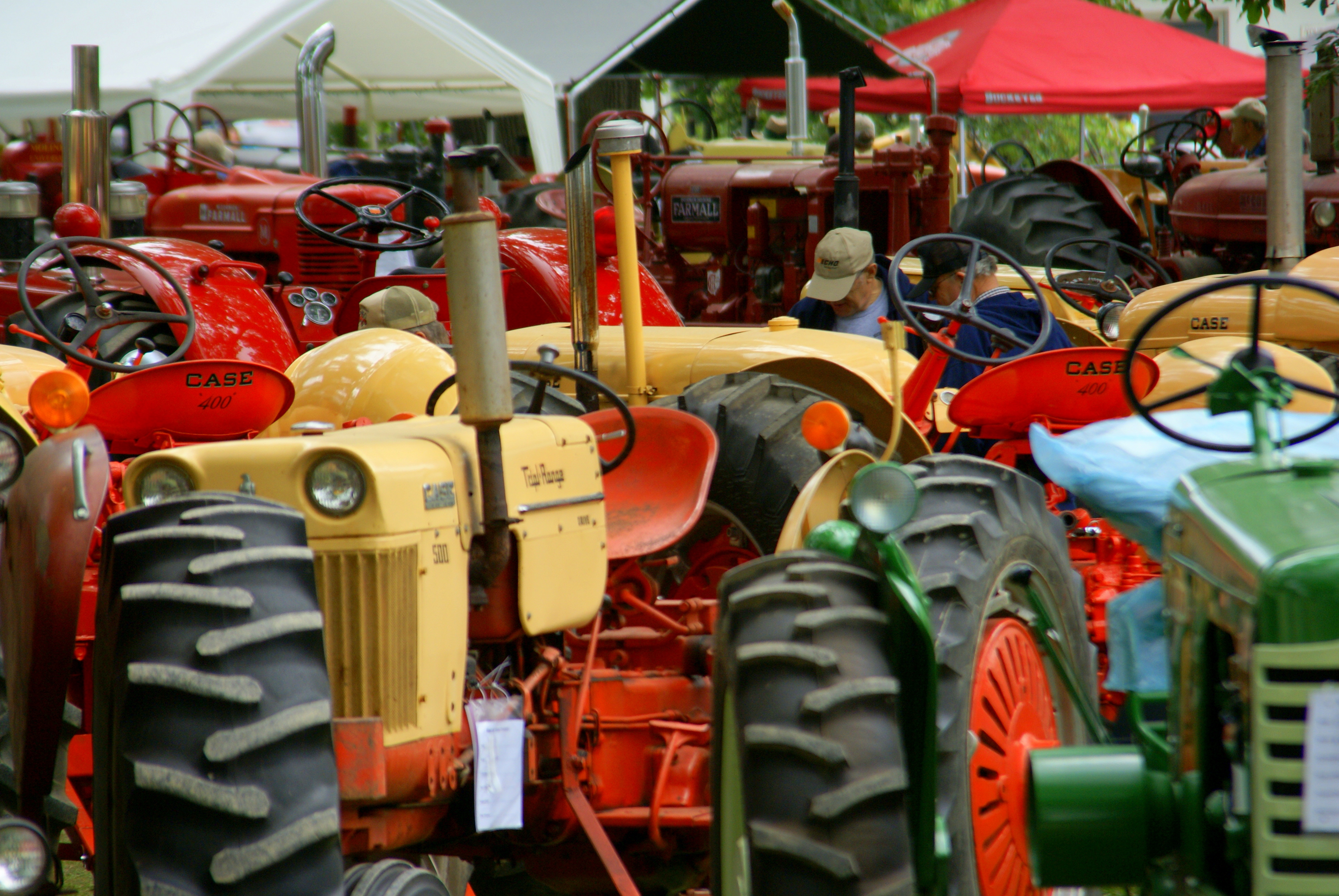
Tractors on display at the 2009 Miami Valley Steam Threshers show at Pastime Park

The village's public park is Pastime Park, and features baseball and softball diamonds, camping facilities, a 0.5-mile (0.80 km) nature walking path, two children's play parks, and the village's public pool, Pastime Pool.

Each year, during the month of July, the village hosts the Miami Valley Steam Threshers show at Pastime Park, which showcases antique tractors, steam threshers and other farm equipment.

== Education ==
The village and surrounding area is serviced by the Jonathan Alder Local School District, which operates Jonathan Alder High School.

Plain City is served by the Plain City Public Library, holding over 64,000 volumes with over 125 periodical subscriptions as of 2005.

== Notable people ==
- Jonathan Alder, pioneer and settler
- Israel Beachy, bass guitarist
- James Dillion, 1952 Summer Olympics bronze medalist
- Perry A. Frey, biochemist
- Arnett Howard, jazz musician
- Herbert Huffman, musician and choir director; founder of the American Boychoir School
- Donnie Nickey, NFL player
- Nanette B. Paul, legal scholar, lawyer, suffragist, author, instructor, lecturer
