= Brown Township =

Brown Township may refer to:

== Arkansas ==
- Brown Township, Monroe County, Arkansas, in Monroe County, Arkansas

== Illinois ==
- Brown Township, Champaign County, Illinois

== Indiana ==
- Brown Township, Hancock County, Indiana
- Brown Township, Hendricks County, Indiana
- Brown Township, Montgomery County, Indiana
- Brown Township, Morgan County, Indiana
- Brown Township, Ripley County, Indiana
- Brown Township, Washington County, Indiana

== Iowa ==
- Brown Township, Linn County, Iowa

== Michigan ==
- Brown Township, Michigan

== Missouri ==
- Brown Township, Douglas County, Missouri, in Douglas County, Missouri

== North Dakota ==
- Brown Township, McHenry County, North Dakota, in McHenry County, North Dakota

== Ohio ==
- Brown Township, Carroll County, Ohio
- Brown Township, Darke County, Ohio
- Brown Township, Delaware County, Ohio
- Brown Township, Franklin County, Ohio
- Brown Township, Knox County, Ohio
- Brown Township, Miami County, Ohio
- Brown Township, Paulding County, Ohio
- Brown Township, Vinton County, Ohio

== Pennsylvania ==
- Brown Township, Lycoming County, Pennsylvania
- Brown Township, Mifflin County, Pennsylvania
