= Sutphen =

Emergency vehicle manufacturer in Amlin, Ohio, US

Sutphen Corporation
- Industry: Trucks & Other Vehicles
- Founded: 1890
- Founder: C.H. Sutphen
- Headquarters: Amlin, Ohio, USA
- Products: Emergency Services Vehicles
- Website: Official website

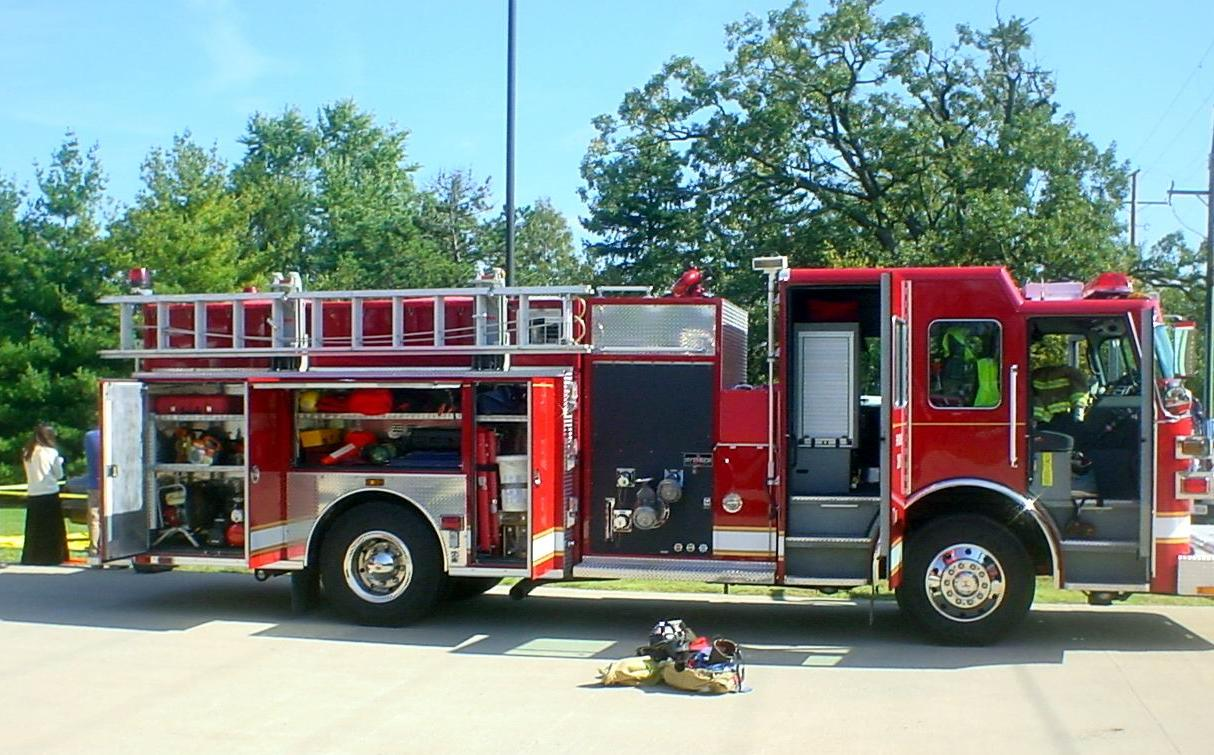
A 2008 Sutphen fire engine

Sutphen is an emergency services vehicle manufacturer and marketer based in Amlin, Ohio, founded in 1890 by C.H. Sutphen. The company has five manufacturing plants in Amlin, Dublin, Hilliard, and Springfield, Ohio, and in Lake Ariel, Pennsylvania.

== Products ==
Sutphen produces all types of fire related vehicles on their own chassis including the usual engines, ladders, and rescues but also provides bodies for commercial chassis applications. The company produces mid-mount aerials as either a tower ladder platform (with a bucket/basket) or in a ladder tower form (no bucket) plus industrial application aerials today. On April 21, 2016, at FDIC International, the company debuted its first ever rear-mount aerial with the Sutphen SLR 75. The following year Sutphen previewed a 108-foot (33 m) model. Previously, Sutphen had produced tillers in the 1990s including a unique tiller-tower concept where the bucket of the tiller aerial also acted as the tillerman's cab. The concept never made it to production. All Sutphen aerials are made of aluminum alloys and fastened with Huck bolts. The hydraulics are custom designed and built by the company for their applications.

Sutphen introduced its tower ladder in 1964, mounted on a Ford C chassis, but production models were mounted on larger chassis including Duplex and GMC. Models were 65, 75, or 85 foot models using three boom sections. Ground ladders were stored in the rear of the vehicle plus additional ladders on one or both sides of the body above compartments. The later addition of a 100-foot (30 m) model used four boom sections and even later the Magnum 110-foot (34 m) model used five. The SPH-100 model was introduced in 2004 originally on the short-lived Imperial chassis with production on the Monarch chassis. This model uses five boom sections to reduce overall length and raised a much larger bucket/basket above the chassis body. All ground ladders are stored at the rear of the vehicle to increase compartment space although side-mounted ground ladders are an option.

On February 25, 2021, Sutphen announced it would return to manufacturing tractor drawn aerials (TDAs or tillers). The aerial device is the same as the SL models. A preview video was released on March 25, 2022, stating the first new TDA would be at FDIC International. An announcement video for the SLTDA 105 was released on April 28, 2022.

=== Aerial platforms ===
Sutphen builds mid-mount aerial platforms utilizing Cummins, Caterpillar, and Detroit Diesel engines, Allison transmissions, Hale and Waterous pumps.

Models include:

- SP70
- SP95
- SP100 (former 100+ model)
- SPI112 (changed from original low-bucket design to SPH style in 2019)
- SPH100
- SPH112 (custom built for NASA, also purchased by Westmere, New York)

=== Aerial ladders ===
SL models have open framework booms for climbing same as traditional aerial ladders. SA models use the enclosed box boom design of Sutphen platforms. SLR models are rear-mounted as opposed to the others being mid-mounted.

- SA75
- SL75
- SL100
- SAI100
- SLR75
- SLR108
- SLTDA105

=== Pumpers ===
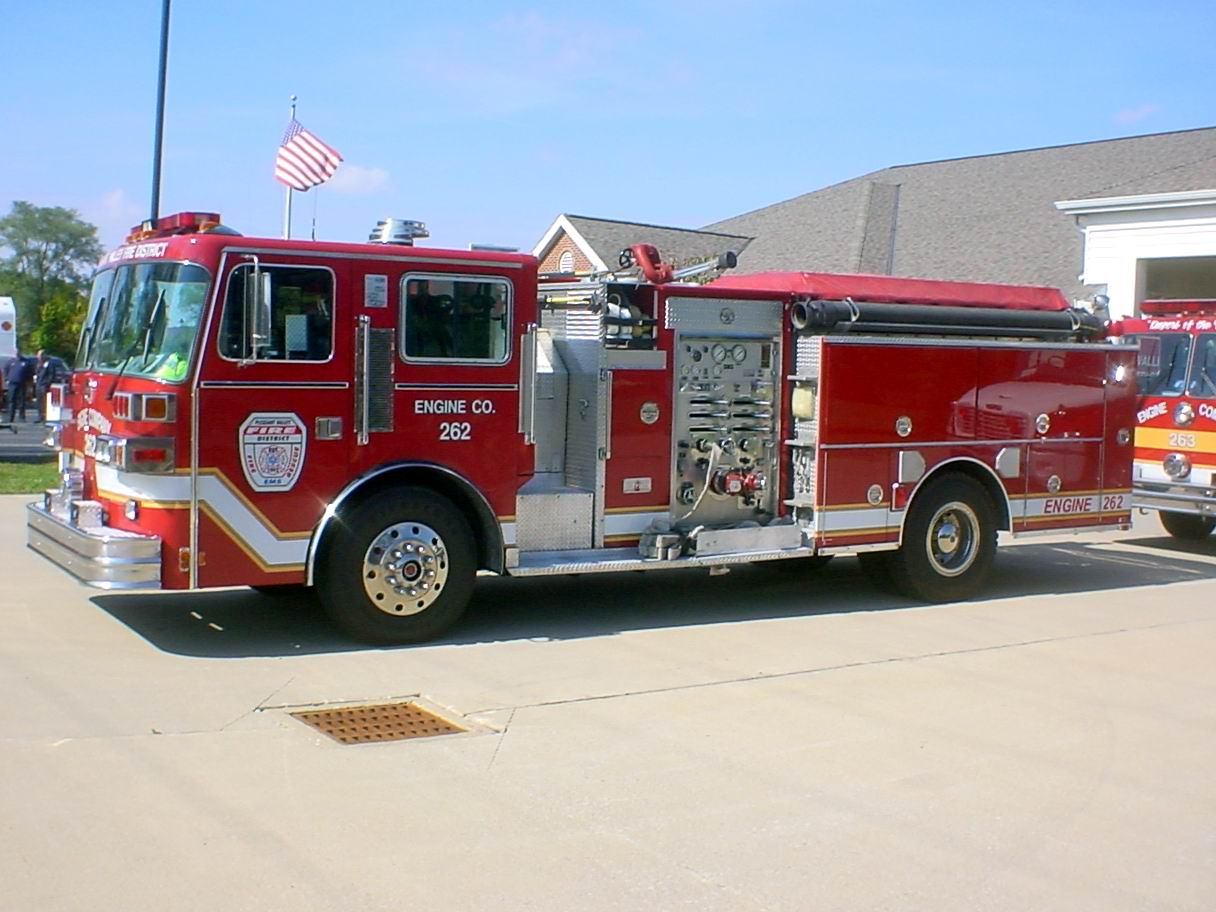
1987 fire engine

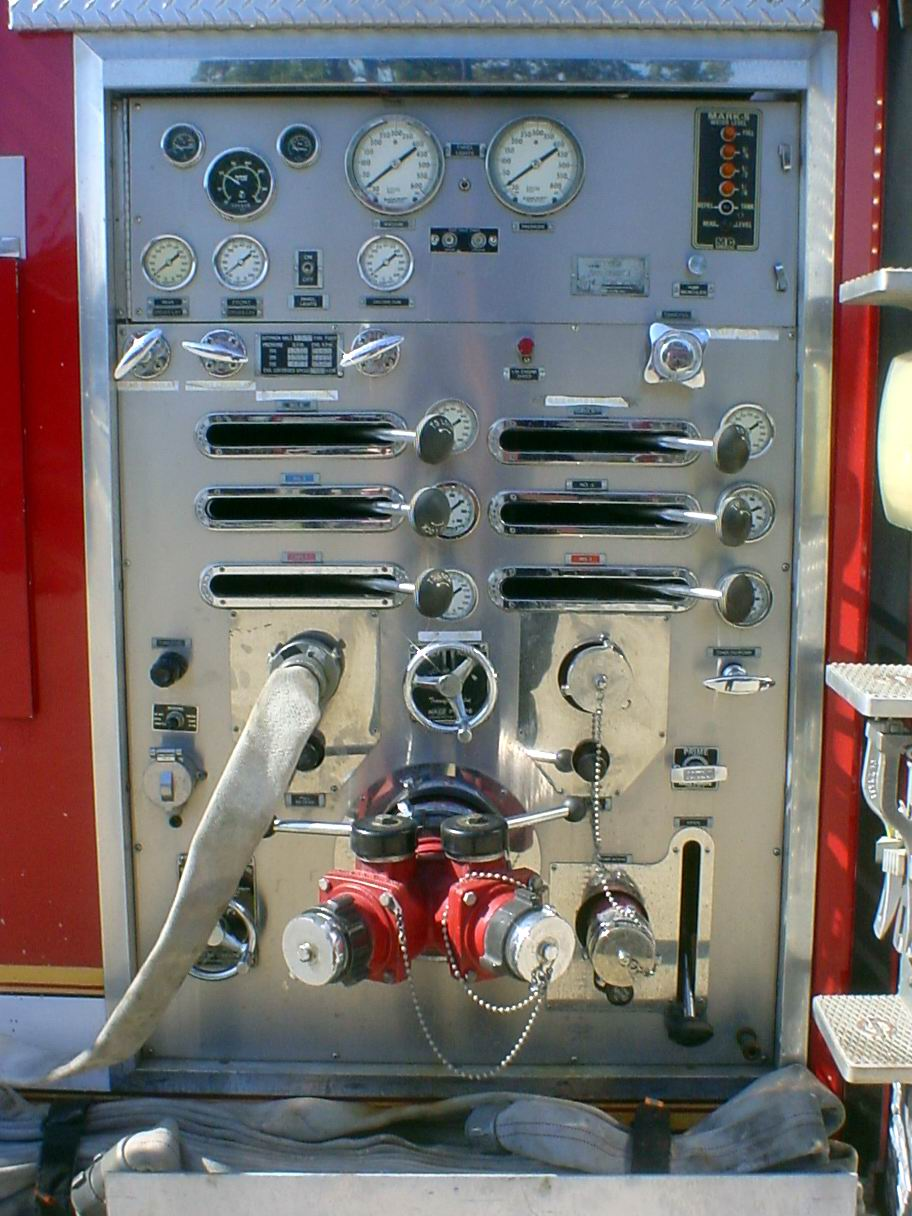
Detail of control panel on 1987 fire engine

Sutphen has 2 pumpers: Guardian and Shield series pumpers. These have been consolidated to a custom pumper built on a Monarch Chassis and proprietary Monarch cab.

- Rescue style
- Traditional
- S1 Aluminum
- S1 Stainless
- S2 Aluminum
- S3 Shield
- S4 Shield
- G7 Guardian
- G9 Guardian

=== Heavy rescue ===
A Heavy Rescue Truck is a 6 to 10 man truck capable of carrying generators, air tanks, lighting, ladders, pike poles, crowbars, dive equipment, and other specialized firefighting tools for use as heavy rescue apparatus, a HazMat vehicle, an Urban Search and Rescue, or Mobile Command Center.

=== Extreme Duty Chassis ===
Sutphen's heavy duty chassis series included the Ambassador, Imperial, Monarch, and "S" Series.

== Fire departments ==
- Sun City, Arizona, has 3 Engines and 1 SP70 Mid Mount Elevated Platform Ladder, and is awaiting delivery of their 4th Engine.
- Orange County Fire Authority has two 2009 SPH100 models placed at Station 9 as Truck 9 in Mission Viejo and at Station 32 as Truck 32 in Yorba Linda.
- Hartford, Connecticut, has Sutphen tower ladders.
- Orlando, Florida, has purchased numerous Sutphen engines, ladders, and rescues since 1970 and continues to purchase more.
- Palm Beach County, Florida, has purchased many Sutphen engines and ladders and continues to purchase more.
- Pinellas Park, Florida, purchased the first production SLR75.
- Winter Haven, Florida, began replacing their fleet of E-One apparatus with the purchase of 2 Sutphen custom Engines in 2016.
- DeKalb County, Georgia, has a 2022 SLTDA105 that is to be delivered very soon. This will be assigned to Truck 23. This is the first SLTDA105 that will go into service.
- Gwinnett County, Georgia, has exclusively used Sutphen aerials since 1986. The current fleet consists of 4 SPH100 aerials, 8 SP95 aerials, 2 SP90 aerials, and 2 SA75 aerials. The department ordered their first Sutphen pumper in 2012 after ordering nothing but Sutphen pumpers in the 1980s and early 1990s.
- Boston Fire Department purchased some of the first modern Sutphen tower ladders in 1970. The first was a 75-foot model which replaced Ladder 3 as Aerial Tower 1, and the second was an 85-foot model which replaced Ladder 26 as Aerial Tower 2. The vehicles were moved around the city as needed. After both aerial units were disbanded in the early 1980s, the second unit re-emerged in 1983 as Boston Fire Department's Tower Unit and served until replacement in 1985. In the late 1970s, Sutphen built engine bodies on Ford and GMC chassis for the department. In the early 1980s, full Sutphen engines were bought including at least one with a shorter aerial device.
- Old Orchard Beach, Maine, has a 2016 Sutphen Aerial and a 2017 Sutphen Pumper.
- Ann Arbor, Michigan, has a 2012 Sutphen SPH100 tower ladder assigned to Tower 1.
- Detroit, Michigan, has used Sutphen tower ladders from 1970 to recent times.
- Camden, New Jersey, has a Sutphen tower ladder assigned to Ladder 1.
- Liverpool, New York, has recently taken delivery of twin SL 75 aerial ladders (Engines 2 and 3) as well as an SPH 100 aerial platform which serves as Truck 2. These apparatus are featured in the photo for the month of February 2010 in the Sutphen calendar.
- The Fire Department of New York purchased two Sutphen 100+ tower ladder quints in 1981. They were the tallest tower ladders in the city until they were taken out of service. Aerialscope only sold 75 foot towers until they developed 95 foot versions in 1985. The patch of Ladder 119 in Brooklyn still has an image of their Sutphen.
- Syracuse, New York, has run an all Sutphen Fleet of Ladder trucks for 30+ years. The newest unit being at Truck 3 on the city's West Side. The current roster is 5. As of 2010, this will also include 3 engines with no aerial ladders also built by Sutphen.
- Eden, North Carolina, purchased the first SLR75 demo.
- Lenoir, North Carolina, has a 2023 rescue pumper. The truck is named Engine 2 and housed at Station 2.
- Columbus, Ohio, has a fleet with many Sutphen Monarch pumpers and aerial platform apparatuses.
- Norwalk, Ohio, bought the first Sutphen tower ladder on a Ford chassis after being used as a demo unit.
- Middleport, Ohio, has an all Sutphen fleet, including the SP70 tower ladder.
- Plain City, Ohio, has 3 Sutphen custom engines, a 1987 (photographed above), 1990, and 2008.
- Portsmouth, Ohio, ran an all Sutphen Fleet until 2008, when the department bought a new Mid Mount Aerial Ladder and Pumper from Pierce.
- The Scranton Fire Department has a Sutphen rescue, two aerial trucks, and two engines.
- Greenville, South Carolina, has an all Sutphen fleet including a heavy rescue, two engines, and a 100-foot (30 m) platform.
- Kenosha, Wisconsin, maintains an all Sutphen fleet of 7 Engines and 3 Ladder trucks. The newest piece of apparatus is Ladder 7, a 2007 110-foot (34 m) tower.
