= Prairie Township, Franklin County, Ohio =

Township in Ohio, US

- Township
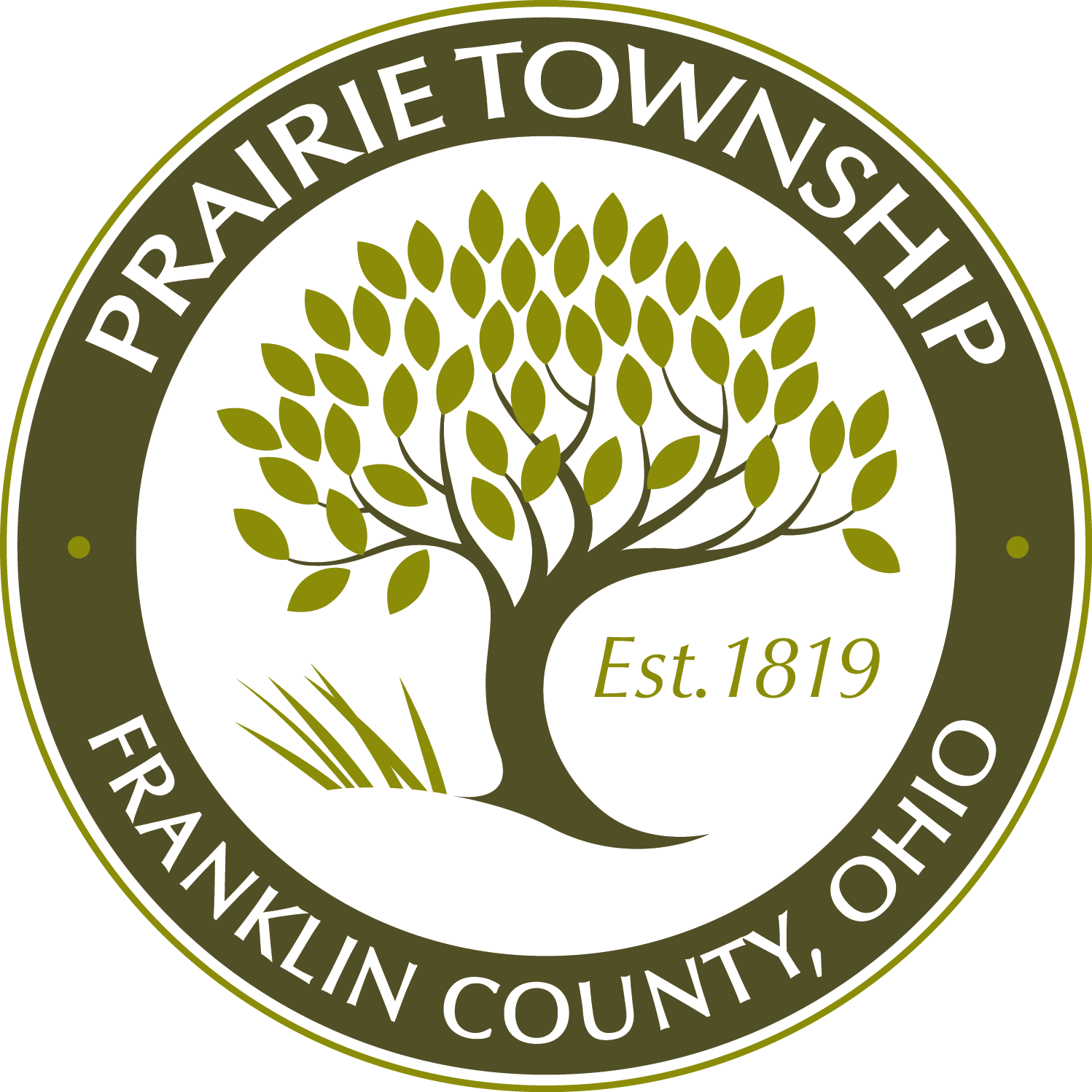
- Seal
- Motto: "Building FUN, Healthy Community!"
- Location of Prairie Township in Franklin County
- Coordinates: 39°57′5″N 83°9′15″W
- Country: United States
- State: Ohio
- County: Franklin

Area
  - Total: 19.1 sq mi (49.5 km^{2})
  - Land: 19.0 sq mi (49.2 km^{2})
  - Water: 0.12 sq mi (0.3 km^{2})
- Elevation: 920 ft (280 m)

Population (2020)
  - Total: 17,415
  - Density: 917/sq mi (354/km^{2})
- Time zone: UTC-5 (Eastern (EST))
  - Summer (DST): UTC-4 (EDT)
- FIPS code: 39-64570
- GNIS feature ID: 1086113
- Website: www.prairietownship.org

Prairie Township is one of the seventeen townships of Franklin County, Ohio, United States. As of the 2020 census the population was 17,415. Prairie Township is on the far west side of Franklin County touching the east side of Madison County.

== Geography ==
Located in the western part of the county, the township consists of several parts:

- Most of the original township, in the west
- A moderately-sized piece, in the northeast
- A small piece, in the southwest corner
- Several small islands, in the far northeast

These various parts have the following borders:

- The city of Columbus surrounds the small islands and lies to the east of the main original piece, to the north, south, and west of the northeastern piece, and to the north and west of the southeastern piece
- To the east, the moderately-sized piece in the northeast borders Franklin Township.
- The small southeastern piece borders Jackson Township to the east.
- The main original piece borders:
  - Brown Township - north
  - Norwich Township - northeast
  - Pleasant Township - south
  - Jefferson Township, Madison County - west

Most of eastern Prairie Township is occupied by the city of Columbus, the county seat of Franklin County. Several populated places are located in the unincorporated areas of the township:

- The unincorporated community of Galloway, in the south
- The former village, now unincorporated community, of New Rome, in the east
- Part of the census-designated place of Lake Darby, in the northwest
- The census-designated place of Lincoln Village, in the northeast

== Name and history ==
Statewide, the only other Prairie Township is located in Holmes County.

Prairie Township was organized in 1819.

== Government ==
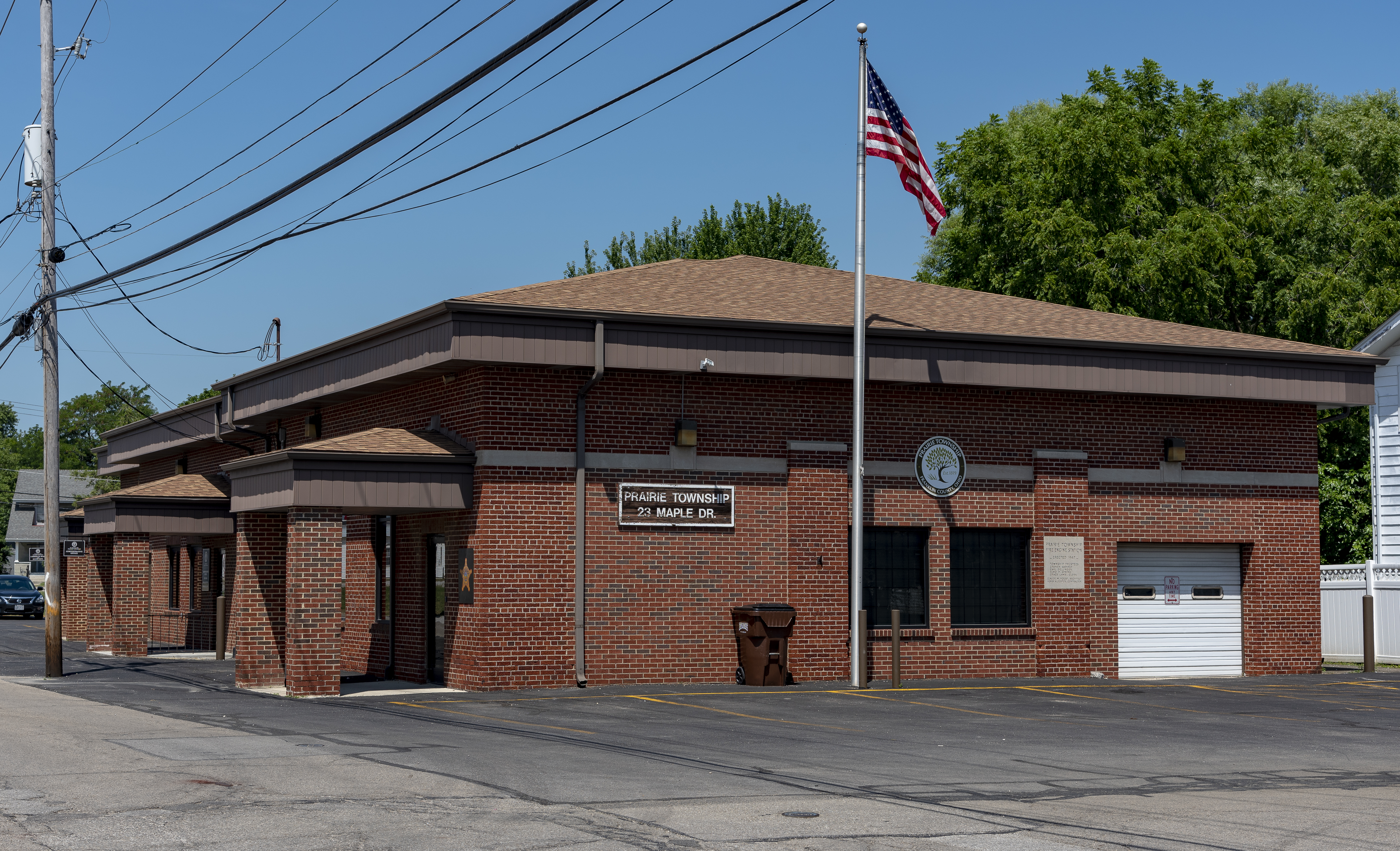
Prairie Township Administrative Center

The township is governed by a three-member board of trustees, who are elected in November of odd-numbered years to a four-year term beginning on the following January 1. Prairie Township adopted a limited home rule form of government (ORC Section 504) in 2002. Two are elected in the year after the presidential election and one is elected in the year before it. There is also an elected township fiscal officer, who serves a four-year term beginning on April 1 of the year after the election, which is held in November of the year before the presidential election. Vacancies in the fiscal officership or on the board of trustees are filled by the remaining trustees.

== Education ==
Some areas of this township are in the Hilliard City School District.

Other areas of this township are in the South-Western City School District (Franklin County, Ohio).

== Public libraries ==
The Westland Area Library of the Southwest Public Libraries is located in the Township.

== Parks and recreation ==
Prairie Township features six neighborhood parks and a 111-acre sports complex (currently under construction).

The Community Center opened in June 2015 and has an indoor swimming pool, indoor walking track, fitness area and gymnasium.

The Recreation Department hosts annual events including the Pumpkin Swim, Trick or Treat Trail, Holiday Tree Lighting, Touch A Truck, and Discover the Greater Prairie.
