= Ohio State Route 142 =

State highway in Madison County, Ohio, US

State Route 142

Route information
- Maintained by ODOT
- Length: 13.657 mi (21.979 km)
- Existed: 1926–present

Major junctions
- West end: US 42 / SR 38 / SR 56 / SR 665 in London
- US 40 in West Jefferson
- East end: I-70 / CR 7 near West Jefferson

Location
- Country: United States
- State: Ohio
- Counties: Madison

Highway system
- Ohio State Highway System; Interstate; US; State; Scenic
← SR 141	→ SR 143

State Route 142 (SR 142) is a state highway in Madison County, Ohio, west of the state capital Columbus. It begins in downtown London and acts as a spur of U.S. Route 42 serving West Jefferson, before ending at an interchange with Interstate 70 north of West Jefferson. The interchange provides Interstate access to West Jefferson, nearby Lake Darby, and Plain City via Madison County Route 7.

== Route description ==
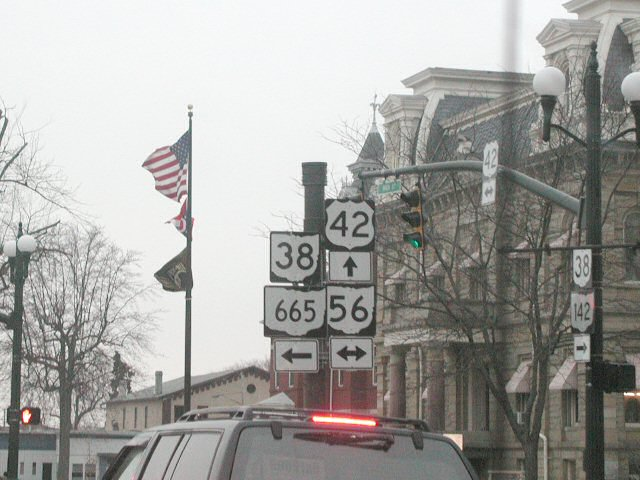
Western terminus in London facing southwest along High Street

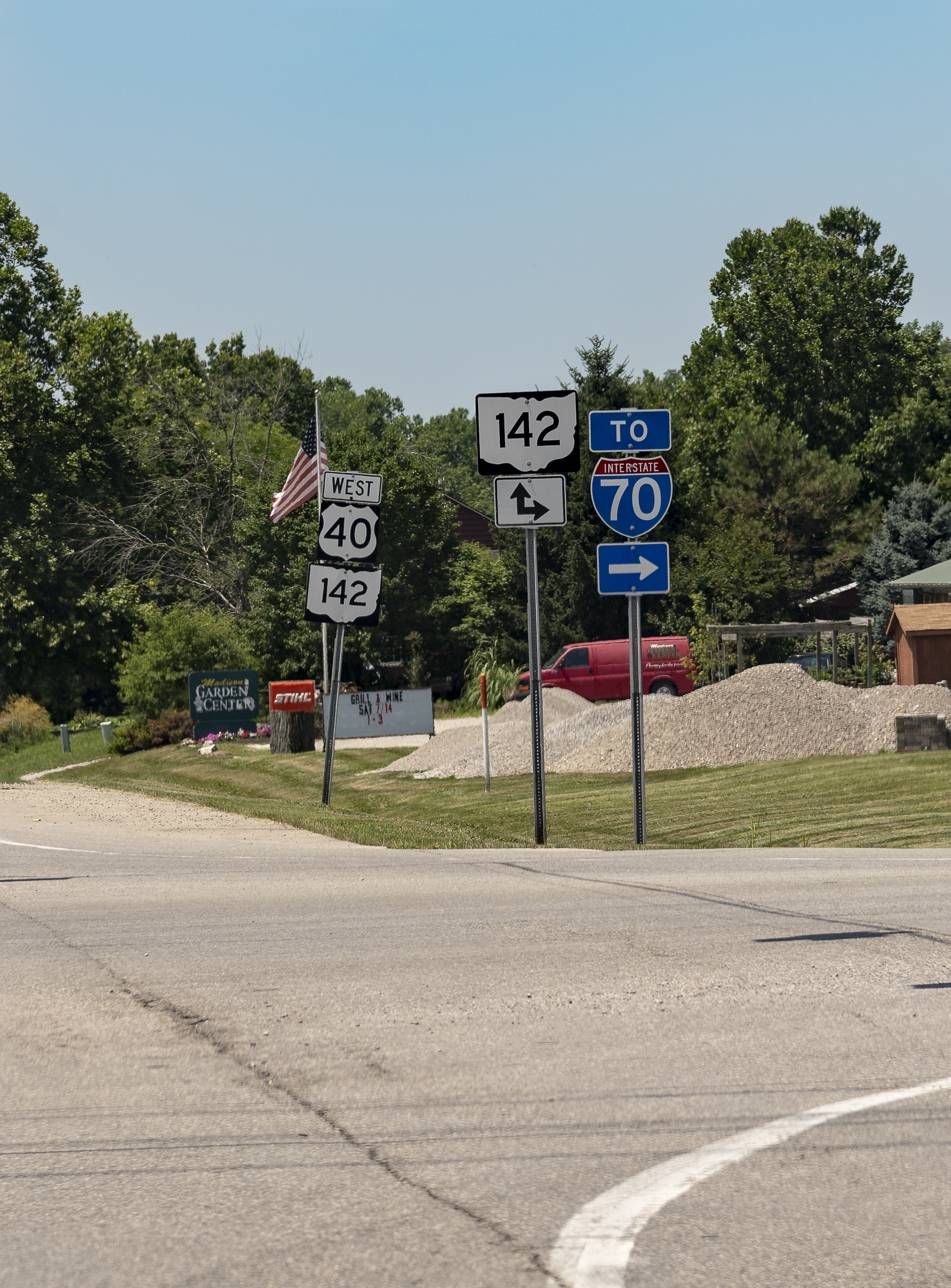
Intersection with US 40 in West Jefferson

The route begins at the intersection of Main and High streets in downtown London. Main Street carries SR 56 both southeast and northwest of here, SR 38 and SR 665 to the southeast. High Street carries US 42 southwest and northeast of this point and SR 38 northeast of there. US 42, SR 38, and SR 142 form a concurrency and head northeast along High Street for three blocks. At Elm Street, US 42 and SR 38 break off from High Street leaving SR 142 along to continue northeast along High Street. The route passes through residential neighborhoods at first but near the eastern outskirts of the city, SR 142 passes several large distribution warehouses. For the five miles (8.0 km) between London and West Jefferson, the route passes many farms and some houses. As the route enters the village limits of West Jefferson, SR 142 and a Norfolk Southern railroad line head northeast into the village and gradually come closer together. Residences and local roads line the north side of the route. At US 40, officially Main Street but also a part of the National Road, SR 142 and US 40 intersect at a skewed angle. Both routes head under the aforementioned rail line and into the central business district of the village. The two routes exit the central portion of the village and enter Jefferson Township. At Plain City-Georgesville Road (CR 7), SR 142 turns north and heads into an outer reach of West Jefferson. The north-south portion of the route is surrounded mostly by farmland but a satellite office of the Battelle Memorial Institute is located along this portion of SR 142. The route ends at I-70's exit 85, a diamond interchange. CR 7 continues north towards Plain City.

== History ==
SR 142 was created in 1927 as a renumbering of SR 28 which ran from Cincinnati to West Jefferson. That year, US 42 replaced most of SR 28 but the segment from London to West Jefferson became SR 142 as US 42 traveled north from London to bypass Columbus. Since its designation, the route had been fully asphalt-paved. The route would remain unchanged for over 40 years until the route was extended along US 40 and CR 7 to an interchange with the newly built I-70 which opened on December 17, 1969. SR 142 was subsequently extended to the new interchange around that time.

== Major junctions ==
The entire route is in Madison County.

Location	mi	km	Destinations	Notes
London	0.000	0.000	US 42 south (West High Street) / SR 38 south / SR 56 / SR 665 east (Main Street)	Western terminus of SR 665, western end of US 42/SR 38 concurrency
London	0.196	0.315	US 42 north / SR 38 north (Elm Street)	Eastern end of US 42/SR 38 concurrency
West Jefferson	10.144	16.325	US 40 west (West Main Street)	Western end of US 40 concurrency
Jefferson Township	11.214	18.047	US 40 east (West Broad Street)	Eastern end of US 40 concurrency
Jefferson Township	13.342– 13.657	21.472– 21.979	I-70 / CR 7 north (NE Plain City-Georgesville Road) – Columbus, Dayton	Exit 85 (I-70)
1.000 mi = 1.609 km; 1.000 km = 0.621 mi: Concurrency terminus
