= Oakland, Ohio =

Oakland, Ohio may refer to any of several locations in the United States state of Ohio:

- Oakland, Butler County, Ohio
- Oakland, Clinton County, Ohio
- Oakland, Fairfield County, Ohio
- Oakland, Franklin County, Ohio
- Oakland, Jackson County, Ohio
- Oakland, Montgomery County, Ohio
