= Norwich Township, Ohio =

Norwich Township, Ohio may refer to:

- Norwich Township, Franklin County, Ohio
- Norwich Township, Huron County, Ohio
