= Franklin County, Ohio =

County in Ohio, United States

Franklin County
- County
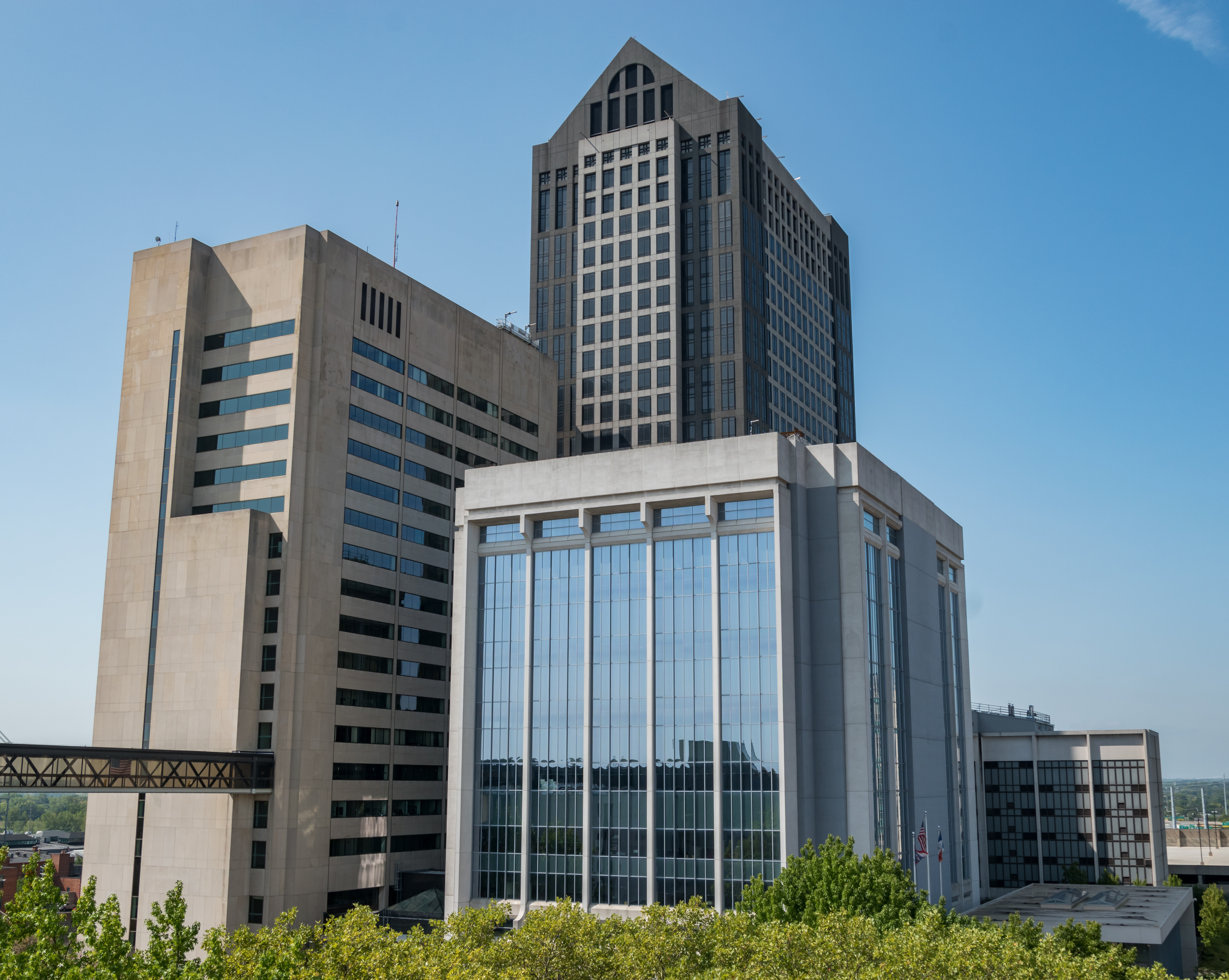
- The Franklin County Government Center

- Flag Coat of arms
- Etymology: Benjamin Franklin
- Map of Ohio highlighting Franklin County
- Coordinates: 39°57′13″N 83°0′1″W
- Country: United States
- State: Ohio
- Region: Central Ohio
- City: Columbus
- Founded: April 30, 1803
- County seat: Columbus

Area
  - Total: 543.623 sq mi (1,407.977 km^{2})
  - Land: 532.422 sq mi (1,378.966 km^{2})
  - Water: 11.202 sq mi (29.013 km^{2})
- Elevation: 1,132 ft (345 m)

Population (2020)
  - Total: 1,323,807
  - Estimate (2025): 1,361,536 ▲
  - Density: 2,486.388/sq mi (959.9997/km^{2})

GDP
  - Total: $141.972 billion (2024)
- Time zone: UTC−5 (Eastern (EST))
  - Summer (DST): UTC−4 (EDT)
- Area codes: 614 and 380
- Congressional districts: 3rd & 15th
- FIPS code: 39-049
- Website: franklincountyohio.gov

Franklin County is located in the U.S. state of Ohio. As of the 2020 census, the population was 1,323,807, making it the most populous county in Ohio. Most of its land area is taken up by its county seat, Columbus, the state capital and most populous city in Ohio. The county was established on April 30, 1803, less than two months after Ohio became a state, and was named after Benjamin Franklin. Originally, Franklin County extended north to Lake Erie before it was subdivided into smaller counties. Franklin County is the central county of the Columbus, Ohio Metropolitan Statistical Area.

Franklin County, particularly Columbus, has been a centerpiece for presidential and congressional politics, most notably the 2000 presidential election, the 2004 presidential election, and the 2006 midterm elections. Franklin County is home to one of the largest universities in the United States, Ohio State University, which has about 60,000 students on its main Columbus campus.

It shares a name with Franklin County in Kentucky, where Frankfort is located. This makes it one of two pairs of capital cities in counties of the same name, along with Marion Counties in Indiana and Oregon.

== History ==
On March 30, 1803, the Ohio government authorized the creation of Franklin County. The county originally was part of Ross County. Residents named the county in honor of Benjamin Franklin. In 1816, Franklin County's Columbus became Ohio's state capital. Surveyors laid out the city in 1812, and officials incorporated it in 1816. Columbus was not Ohio's original capital, but the state legislature chose to move the state government there after its location for a short time at Chillicothe and at Zanesville. Columbus was chosen as the site for the new capital because of its central location within the state and access by way of major transportation routes (primarily rivers) at that time. The legislature chose it as Ohio's capital over a number of other competitors, including Franklinton, Dublin, Worthington, and Delaware.

On May 5, 1802, a group of prospective settlers founded the Scioto Company at the home of Rev. Eber B. Clark in Granby, Connecticut, for the purpose of forming a settlement between the Muskingum River and Great Miami River in the Ohio Country. James Kilbourne was elected president and Josiah Topping secretary. On August 30, 1802, James Kilbourne and Nathaniel Little arrived at Colonel Thomas Worthington's home in Chillicothe. They tentatively reserved land along the Scioto River on the Pickaway Plains for their new settlement.

On October 5, 1802, the Scioto Company met again in Granby and decided not to purchase the lands along the Scioto River on the Pickaway Plains, but rather to buy land 30 miles (48 km) farther north from Jonas Stanbery and his partner, an American Revolutionary War general, Jonathan Dayton. Sixteen thousand acres (65 km^{2}; 6,500 ha) were purchased along the Whetstone River (now known as the Olentangy River) at $1.50 per acre. This land was part of the United States Military District surveyed by Israel Ludlow in 1797 and divided into townships 5 miles (8.0 km) square.

Before the state legislature's decision in 1812, Columbus did not exist. The city was originally designed as the state's new capital, preparing itself for its role in Ohio's political, economic, and social life. In the years between the first ground-breaking and the actual movement of the capital in 1816, Columbus and Franklin County grew significantly. By 1813, workers had built a penitentiary, and by the following year, residents had established the first church, school, and newspaper in Columbus. Workers completed the Ohio Statehouse in 1861. Columbus and Franklin County grew quickly in population, with the city having 700 people by 1815. Columbus officially became the county seat in 1824. By 1834, the population of Columbus was 4,000 people, officially elevating it to "city" status.

== Geography ==
According to the United States Census Bureau, the county has a total area of 544 square miles (1,410 km^{2}), of which 532 square miles (1,380 km^{2}) is land and 11 square miles (28 km^{2}) (2.1%) is water. The county is located in the Till Plains and the Appalachian Plateau land regions.

The county is drained by the Olentangy River and the Scioto River. Major creeks in the county include Big Darby Creek, Big Walnut Creek, and Alum Creek. There are two large reservoirs in the county, Hoover Reservoir and Griggs Reservoir.

=== Adjacent counties ===
- Delaware County (north)
- Fairfield County (southeast)
- Licking County (east)
- Madison County (west)
- Pickaway County (south)
- Union County (northwest)

=== Major highways ===
- I-70
- I-71
- I-73 (future)
- I-270
- I-670
- US 23
- US 33
- US 40
- US 62
- SR 3
- SR 16
- SR 104
- SR 161
- SR 257
- SR 315
- SR 317
- SR 605
- SR 665
- SR 745

== Demographics ==
Historical population
Census	Pop.	Note	%±
1810	3,486		—
1820	10,292		195.2%
1830	14,741		43.2%
1840	25,049		69.9%
1850	42,909		71.3%
1860	50,361		17.4%
1870	63,019		25.1%
1880	86,797		37.7%
1890	124,087		43.0%
1900	164,460		32.5%
1910	221,567		34.7%
1920	283,951		28.2%
1930	361,055		27.2%
1940	388,712		7.7%
1950	503,410		29.5%
1960	682,962		35.7%
1970	833,249		22.0%
1980	869,132		4.3%
1990	961,437		10.6%
2000	1,068,978		11.2%
2010	1,163,414		8.8%
2020	1,323,807		13.8%
2025 (est.)	1,361,536	▲	2.9%
U.S. Decennial Census; 1790-1960 1900–1990; 1990–2000 2010–2020

=== 2020 census ===
As of the 2020 census, the county had a population of 1,323,807 and a population density of 2,486.4 inhabitants per square mile (960.0/km^{2}). The median age was 34.2 years; 22.8% of residents were under the age of 18, 6.5% were under the age of 5, and 12.7% were 65 years of age or older. For every 100 females there were 95.1 males, and for every 100 females age 18 and over there were 92.5 males age 18 and over.

There were 540,369 households in the county, including 309,654 families; 28.9% had children under the age of 18 living in them, 38.1% were married-couple households, 22.1% were households with a male householder and no spouse or partner present, and 31.4% were households with a female householder and no spouse or partner present. About 32.5% of all households were made up of individuals and 9.4% had someone living alone who was 65 years of age or older.

There were 580,903 housing units, of which 7.0% were vacant. Among occupied housing units, 51.3% were owner-occupied and 48.7% were renter-occupied. The homeowner vacancy rate was 1.2% and the rental vacancy rate was 7.9%.

98.6% of residents lived in urban areas, while 1.4% lived in rural areas.

The racial makeup of the county was 60.6% White, 22.6% Black or African American, 0.3% American Indian and Alaska Native, 5.6% Asian, <0.1% Native Hawaiian and Pacific Islander, 3.7% from some other race, and 7.0% from two or more races. Hispanic or Latino residents of any race comprised 6.9% of the population.

=== Racial and ethnic composition ===
Franklin County, Ohio – Racial and ethnic composition Note: the US Census treats Hispanic/Latino as an ethnic category. This table excludes Latinos from the racial categories and assigns them to a separate category. Hispanics/Latinos may be of any race.
Race / Ethnicity (NH = Non-Hispanic)	Pop 1980	Pop 1990	Pop 2000	Pop 2010	Pop 2020	% 1980	% 1990	% 2000	% 2010	% 2020
White alone (NH)	721,429	778,255	795,660	783,048	787,615	83.01%	80.95%	74.43%	67.31%	59.50%
Black or African American alone (NH)	130,190	151,943	189,652	244,200	296,076	14.98%	15.80%	17.74%	20.99%	22.37%
Native American or Alaska Native alone (NH)	1,255	1,943	2,598	2,280	2,160	0.14%	0.20%	0.24%	0.20%	0.16%
Asian alone (NH)	6,510	18,968	32,652	44,723	73,714	0.75%	1.97%	3.05%	3.84%	5.57%
Native Hawaiian or Pacific Islander alone (NH)	x	x	411	676	444	x	x	0.04%	0.06%	0.03%
Other race alone (NH)	3,240	1,092	2,297	2,647	7,212	0.37%	0.11%	0.21%	0.23%	0.54%
Mixed race or Multiracial (NH)	x	x	21,429	30,122	65,404	x	x	2.00%	2.59%	4.94%
Hispanic or Latino (any race)	6,508	9,236	24,279	55,718	91,182	0.75%	0.96%	2.27%	4.79%	6.89%
Total	869,132	961,437	1,068,978	1,163,414	1,323,807	100.00%	100.00%	100.00%	100.00%	100.00%

=== 2010 census ===
As of the 2010 census, there were 1,163,414 people, 477,235 households, and 278,030 families living in the county. The population density was 2,186.1 inhabitants per square mile (844.1/km^{2}). There were 527,186 housing units at an average density of 990.6 per square mile (382.5/km^{2}). The racial makeup of the county was 69.2% white, 21.2% black or African American, 3.9% Asian, 0.2% American Indian, 0.1% Pacific islander, 2.3% from other races, and 3.0% from two or more races. Those of Hispanic or Latino origin made up 4.8% of the population. In terms of ancestry, 24.2% were German, 14.4% were Irish, 9.1% were English, 5.5% were Italian, and 5.0% were American.

Of the 477,235 households, 31.0% had children under the age of 18 living with them, 39.0% were married couples living together, 14.4% had a female householder with no husband present, 41.7% were non-families, and 31.9% of all households were made up of individuals. The average household size was 2.38 and the average family size was 3.05. The median age was 33.4 years.

The median income for a household in the county was $49,087 and the median income for a family was $62,372. Males had a median income of $45,920 versus $37,685 for females. The per capita income for the county was $26,909. About 12.1% of families and 17.0% of the population were below the poverty line, including 23.0% of those under age 18 and 9.4% of those age 65 or over.

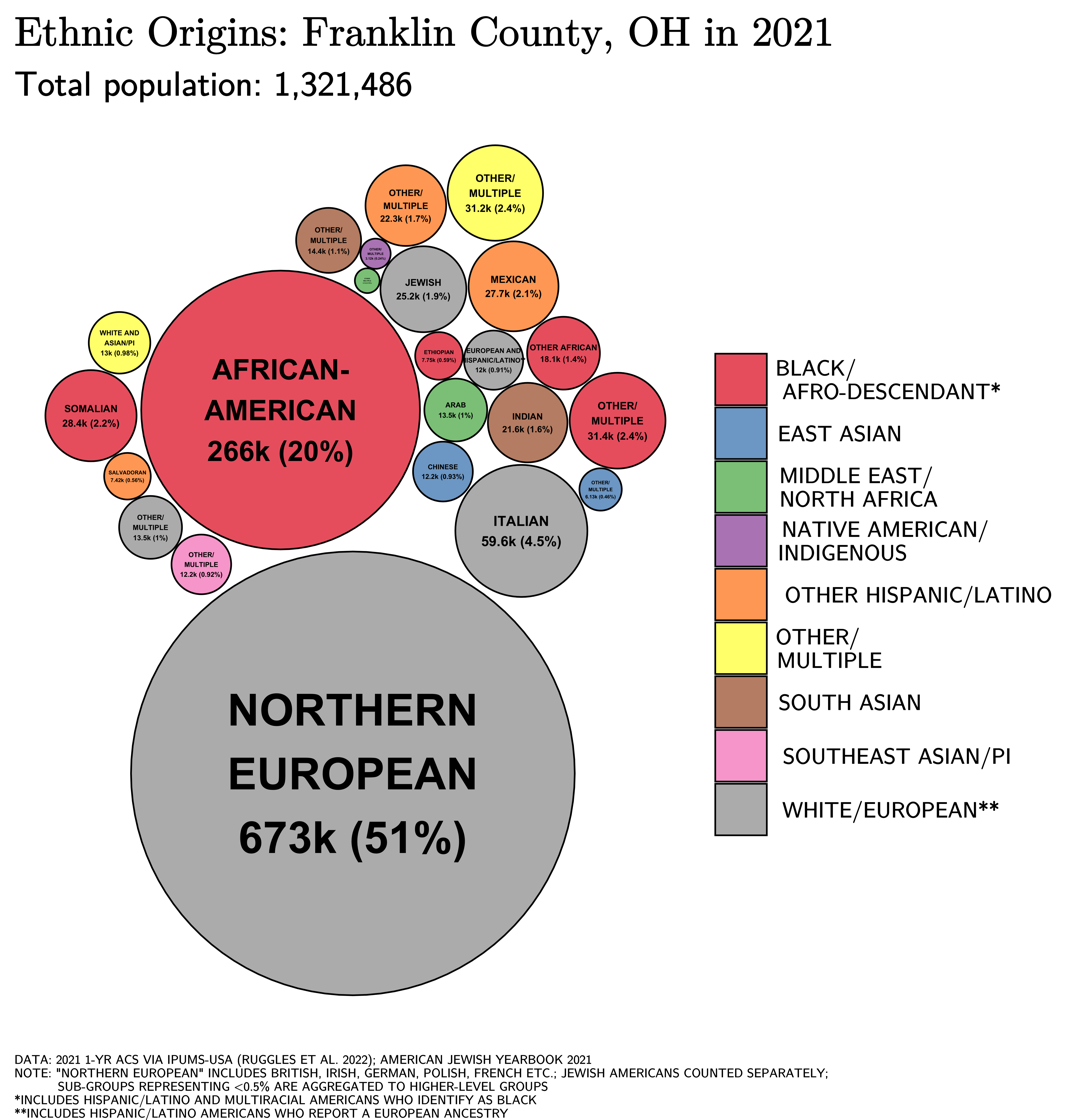
Ethnic origins in Franklin County

== Economy ==
=== Top Employers ===
According to the County's 2022 Annual Comprehensive Financial Report, the largest employers in the county are:

#	Employer	Type of Business	# of Employees	Percentage
1	Ohio State University	Higher Education	33,653	4.90%
2	State of Ohio	Government	22,736	3.31%
3	JP Morgan Chase & Company	Finance	16,896	2.46%
4	Kroger Company	Retail	11,529	1.68%
5	Nationwide Children's Hospital	Health Care	11,302	1.65%
6	Nationwide	Insurance	11,000	1.60%
7	Amazon	Retail	9,262	1.35%
8	City of Columbus	Government	8,656	1.26%
9	Mount Carmel Health System	Health Care	7,887	1.15%
10	Honda	Manufacturer	5,800	0.85%
—	Total employers	—	138,721	20.21%

== Politics ==
For most of the 20th century, Franklin County shared the heavy Republican bent of the rest of central Ohio, and was one of the more conservative urban counties in the nation. From 1896 to 1992, it went Republican all but five times, the last three of which were national Democratic landslides that saw the Democratic candidate win over 400 electoral votes. However, it has gone Democratic in every election since 1996, reflecting the Democratic trend in most other urban counties nationwide. Columbus and most of its northern and western suburbs lean Democratic, while the more blue-collar southern section of the county leans Republican. From 1996 to 2004, Democratic nominees carried the county by single digit margins, but it swung significantly in favor of Barack Obama in 2008. The county swung towards Democrats in every subsequent presidential election until 2024, when Democratic nominee Kamala Harris won the county with 63.0 percent of the vote and a 28.1 percent margin of victory.

In Congress, it is split between two districts. Most of Columbus itself is in the 3rd district, represented by Democrat Joyce Beatty. The southwestern portion is in the 15th district, represented by Republican Mike Carey.

United States presidential election results for Franklin County, Ohio
Year	Republican		Democratic		Third party(ies)	
Year	No.	%	No.	%	No.	%
1856	3,488	44.42%	3,791	48.27%	574	7.31%
1860	4,295	45.99%	4,846	51.90%	197	2.11%
1864	4,819	45.73%	5,719	54.27%	0	0.00%
1868	5,079	41.64%	7,119	58.36%	0	0.00%
1872	5,796	43.92%	7,345	55.66%	56	0.42%
1876	7,557	44.36%	9,383	55.07%	97	0.57%
1880	9,438	48.30%	9,863	50.47%	240	1.23%
1884	11,194	47.68%	11,842	50.44%	441	1.88%
1888	13,453	47.59%	14,126	49.97%	692	2.45%
1892	14,341	46.51%	15,495	50.25%	999	3.24%
1896	20,291	51.96%	18,320	46.91%	442	1.13%
1900	22,237	52.16%	19,809	46.46%	590	1.38%
1904	27,439	61.49%	15,502	34.74%	1,681	3.77%
1908	28,914	53.45%	23,314	43.10%	1,869	3.45%
1912	12,791	25.22%	20,697	40.81%	17,227	33.97%
1916	24,107	40.36%	34,103	57.10%	1,517	2.54%
1920	59,691	54.23%	48,452	44.02%	1,921	1.75%
1924	61,891	57.68%	26,505	24.70%	18,899	17.61%
1928	92,019	65.86%	47,084	33.70%	609	0.44%
1932	67,957	52.21%	58,539	44.97%	3,664	2.81%
1936	63,830	40.39%	90,746	57.42%	3,471	2.20%
1940	92,533	48.92%	96,601	51.08%	0	0.00%
1944	99,292	52.62%	89,394	47.38%	0	0.00%
1948	98,707	53.36%	84,806	45.84%	1,486	0.80%
1952	138,894	60.25%	91,620	39.75%	0	0.00%
1956	151,544	65.78%	78,852	34.22%	0	0.00%
1960	161,178	59.37%	110,283	40.63%	0	0.00%
1964	131,345	45.95%	154,527	54.05%	0	0.00%
1968	148,933	51.78%	101,240	35.20%	37,451	13.02%
1972	219,771	63.74%	117,562	34.09%	7,475	2.17%
1976	189,645	55.66%	141,624	41.57%	9,443	2.77%
1980	200,948	53.87%	143,932	38.58%	28,165	7.55%
1984	250,360	64.12%	131,530	33.68%	8,584	2.20%
1988	226,265	59.96%	147,585	39.11%	3,507	0.93%
1992	186,324	41.89%	176,656	39.72%	81,821	18.39%
1996	178,412	44.55%	192,795	48.14%	29,308	7.32%
2000	197,862	47.78%	202,018	48.79%	14,194	3.43%
2004	237,253	45.12%	285,801	54.35%	2,773	0.53%
2008	218,486	38.89%	334,709	59.58%	8,568	1.53%
2012	215,997	37.75%	346,373	60.53%	9,818	1.72%
2016	199,331	33.93%	351,198	59.78%	36,995	6.30%
2020	211,237	33.40%	409,144	64.68%	12,151	1.92%
2024	210,830	34.89%	380,518	62.98%	12,836	2.12%

United States Senate election results for Franklin County, Ohio1
Year	Republican		Democratic		Third party(ies)	
Year	No.	%	No.	%	No.	%
2024	186,441	31.65%	385,850	65.50%	16,790	2.85%

== Government ==
=== Franklin County Officials ===
Office	Officeholder	Party
Franklin County Commissioner	Erica Crawley	Democratic
Franklin County Commissioner	Kevin Boyce	Democratic
Franklin County Commissioner	John O'Grady	Democratic
Auditor	Michael Stinziano	Democratic
Clerk of Courts	Maryellen O'Shaughnessy	Democratic
Coroner	Nate Overmire	Democratic
Engineer	Adam Fowler	Democratic
Prosecutor	Shayla Favor	Democratic
Recorder	Danny O'Connor	Democratic
Sheriff	Dallas Baldwin	Democratic
Treasurer	Cheryl Brooks Sullivann	Democratic

=== Ohio House of Representatives ===
District	Representative	Party
1	Dontavius Jarrells	Democratic
2	Latyna Humphrey	Democratic
3	Ismail Mohamed	Democratic
4	Beryl Piccolantonio	Democratic
5	Meredith Lawson-Rowe	Democratic
6	Christine Cockley	Democratic
7	Allison Russo	Democratic
8	Anita Somani	Democratic
9	Munira Abdullahi	Democratic
10	Mark Sigrist	Democratic
11	Crystal Lett	Democratic
12	Brian Stewart	Republican

=== Ohio State Senate ===
District	Senator	Party
3	Michele Reynolds	Republican
15	Hearcel Craig	Democratic
16	Beth Liston	Democratic
25	Bill DeMora	Democratic

=== United States House of Representatives ===
District	Representative	Party
03	Joyce Beatty	Democratic
15	Mike Carey	Republican

=== United States Senate ===
Senator	Party
Bernie Moreno	Republican
Jon Husted	Republican

== Communities ==
Map of Franklin County with municipal and township labels (2010)

Franklin County is currently made up of 16 cities, 10 villages, and 18 townships.

=== Cities ===
- Bexley
- Canal Winchester
- Columbus (state capital) (county seat)
- Dublin
- Gahanna
- Grandview Heights
- Grove City
- Groveport
- Hilliard
- New Albany
- Obetz
- Pickerington
- Reynoldsburg
- Upper Arlington
- Westerville
- Whitehall
- Worthington

=== Villages ===
- Brice
- Harrisburg
- Lithopolis
- Lockbourne
- Marble Cliff
- Minerva Park
- Riverlea
- Urbancrest
- Valleyview

=== Townships ===
- Blendon
- Brown
- Clinton
- Franklin
- Hamilton
- Jackson
- Jefferson
- Madison
- Mifflin
- Norwich
- Perry
- Plain
- Pleasant
- Prairie
- Sharon
- Truro
- Washington
- Montgomery ("paper" township coextensive with the city of Columbus)
- Valleyview ("paper" township coextensive with the village of Valleyview)

=== Defunct Townships ===
- Marion (completely annexed by the city of Columbus)

=== Census-designated places ===
- Blacklick Estates
- Darbydale
- Harrisburg
- Huber Ridge
- Lake Darby
- Lincoln Village

=== Other unincorporated communities ===
- Amlin
- Blacklick
- Flint
- Galloway
- Georgesville
- New Rome
- Oakland

== Education ==
School districts include:

City school districts:

- Bexley City School District
- Columbus City School District
- Dublin City School District
- Gahanna-Jefferson City School District
- Grandview Heights City School District
- Hilliard City School District
- Reynoldsburg City School District
- South-Western City School District
- Upper Arlington City School District
- Westerville City School District
- Whitehall City School District
- Worthington City School District

Local school districts:

- Canal Winchester Local School District
- Groveport Madison Local School District
- Hamilton Local School District
- Jonathan Alder Local School District
- Licking Heights Local School District
- Madison-Plains Local School District
- New Albany-Plain Local School District
- Olentangy Local School District
- Pickerington Local School District
- Teays Valley Local School District

State-operated schools include:

- Ohio State School for the Blind
- Ohio School for the Deaf

== See also ==
- National Register of Historic Places listings in Franklin County, Ohio
