= Brown Township, Indiana =

Brown Township is the name of six townships in the U.S. state of Indiana:

- Brown Township, Hancock County, Indiana
- Brown Township, Hendricks County, Indiana
- Brown Township, Montgomery County, Indiana
- Brown Township, Morgan County, Indiana
- Brown Township, Ripley County, Indiana
- Brown Township, Washington County, Indiana

== See also ==
- Brown Township (disambiguation)
