= Conover, Ohio =

Unincorporated community in Ohio, U.S.

Coordinates: 40°08′07″N 84°02′47″W

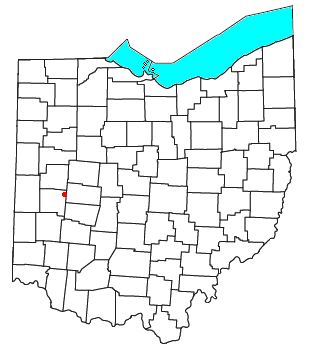
Location of Conover, Ohio

Conover /ˈkɒnoʊvər/ is an unincorporated community in eastern Brown Township, Miami County, Ohio, United States. It has a post office with the ZIP code 45317.

The community is part of the Dayton Metropolitan Statistical Area.

Conover was laid out in 1856, and named for surveyor A. G. Conover. A post office called Conover has been in operation since 1859.

The A.B. Graham Memorial Center, honoring the founder of the 4-H movement, is located at the former Miami East Junior High School in Conover.
