= Ohio State Route 665 =

State highway in central Ohio, US

State Route 665

Route information
- Maintained by ODOT
- Length: 25.63 mi (41.25 km)
- Existed: 1937–present

Major junctions
- West end: US 42 / SR 38 / SR 56 / SR 142 in London
- US 62 / SR 3 near Grove City; I-71 in Grove City
- East end: US 23 / SR 317 in Shadeville

Location
- Country: United States
- State: Ohio
- Counties: Madison, Franklin

Highway system
- Ohio State Highway System; Interstate; US; State; Scenic
← SR 664	→ SR 666

State Route 665 (SR 665) is an east–west state highway located in central Ohio, a U.S. state. The western terminus of this state highway is at a signalized intersection that marks the confluence of US 42, SR 38, SR 56 and SR 142 in downtown London. Its eastern terminus is at an intersection with US 23 and SR 317 approximately 2.50 miles (4.02 km) northwest of the village of Lockbourne.

== Route description ==
SR 665 passes through the eastern portion of Madison County and the southwestern corner of Franklin County. There is no segment of this route that is included within the National Highway System, a system of highways deemed most important for the nation's economy, mobility and defense.

== History ==
When it was first designated in 1937, SR 665 was routed along its present alignment between the junction of US 42, SR 38, SR 56, and SR 142 in London and US 23 near Lockbourne. Just two years later, the highway was extended on the east end, via a short jog northerly along US 23, then east along what is today SR 317 from US 23 into Groveport, where the route came to an end at the Main Street intersection. Then, in 1973, a southward extension of SR 317 through the eastern portion of suburban Columbus resulted in that highway being extended to Groveport. SR 317 was linked in with what was then the eastern terminus of SR 665, and then replaced SR 665 from that point westerly to US 23. Consequently, SR 665 was restored to its original routing, and has not changed since that time. As of 2013, SR 317's southern terminus has been realigned to end at SR 665's eastern terminus.

== Major intersections ==
County	Location	mi	km	Destinations	Notes
Madison	London	0.00	0.00	US 42 / SR 38 north / SR 142 east (High Street) / SR 56 west (North Main Street)	Western end of SR 38/SR 56 concurrency; western terminus of SR 142
Madison	London	0.31	0.50	SR 38 south (West Center Street) / SR 56 east (South Main Street)	Eastern end of SR 38/SR 56 concurrency
Franklin	Pleasant Township	18.10	29.13	US 62 / SR 3 (Harrisburg Pike)	
Franklin	Grove City	19.98	32.15	I-71 – Columbus, Cincinnati	Exit 97 (I-71)
Franklin	Grove City	23.31	37.51	SR 104 (Jackson Pike) – Columbus, Chillicothe	
Franklin	Hamilton Township	25.63	41.25	US 23 (South High Street) / SR 317 north (London Groveport Road) – Groveport, Circleville	Southern terminus of SR 317
1.000 mi = 1.609 km; 1.000 km = 0.621 mi: Concurrency terminus
