= Ohio State Route 317 =

State highway in Franklin County, Ohio, US

State Route 317

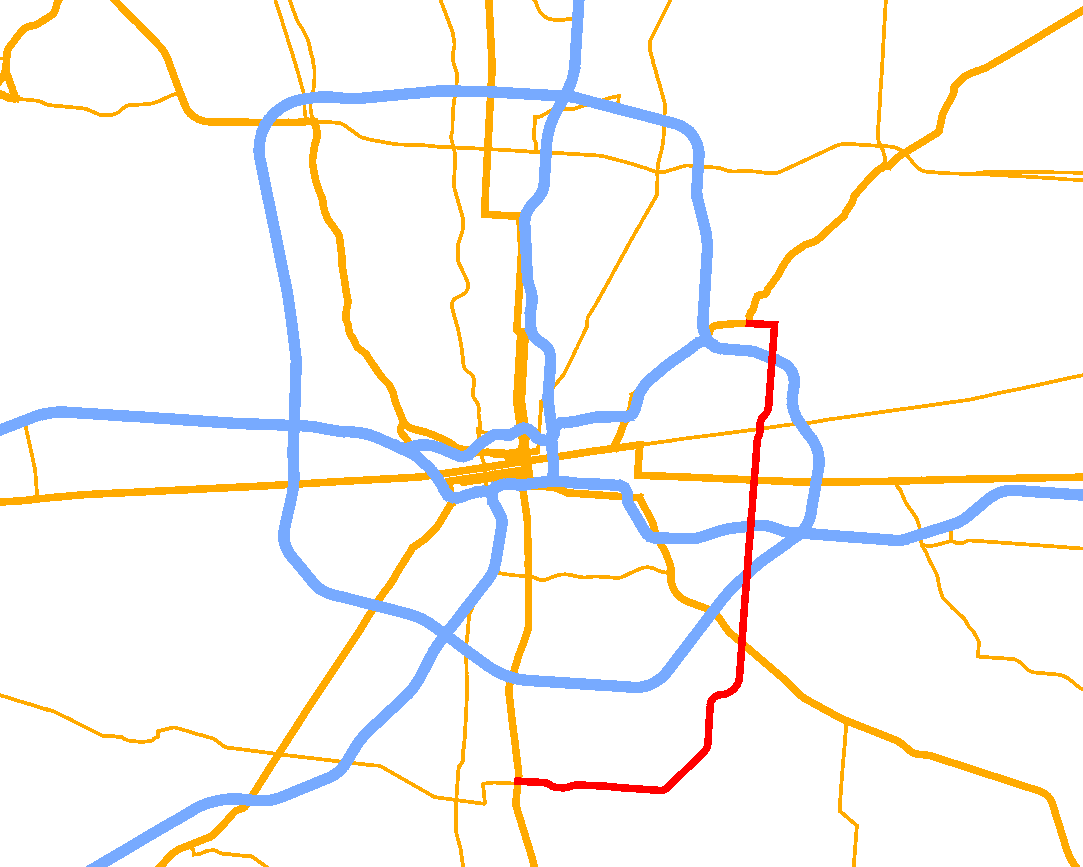

Route information
- Maintained by ODOT
- Length: 18.87 mi (30.37 km)
- Existed: 1932–present

Major junctions
- South end: US 23 / SR 665 in Shadeville
- US 33 in Columbus; I-70 in Columbus; US 40 in Whitehall; I-270 in Gahanna
- North end: US 62 in Gahanna

Location
- Country: United States
- State: Ohio
- Counties: Franklin

Highway system
- Ohio State Highway System; Interstate; US; State; Scenic
← SR 316	→ SR 318

State Route 317 (SR 317) is a north–south state highway in the central portion of the U.S. state of Ohio. Its southern terminus is at U.S. Route 23 approximately 9 miles (14 km) south of Downtown Columbus and just outside the city limits; its northern terminus is at U.S. Route 62 in Gahanna. The route serves as a partial southeastern outbelt for the Columbus metropolitan area, passing through many commercial districts and light industry areas.

SR 317 was established in the early 1930s. The highway was extended three times, the first in the early 1960s, to US 33. The second time the route was in the early 1970s and it was extended south to Groveport. The final time the route was extended was in the mid-1970s and the route was extended to US 23.

== Route description ==
SR 317 begins at an intersection with US 23. This intersection is also the eastern terminus of SR 665, on the west side of US 23. SR 317 heads east as a two-lane, passing through farmland and woodland. The highway passes over a CSX and a Norfolk Southern railroad tracks. After the railroad tracks, the route passes through light industry properties. The road has an intersection with Alum Creek Drive, this intersection provides access to Rickenbacker International Airport. Here, SR 317 has its lowest traffic counts; within the 2011 ODOT survey, the road is listed with an average annual daily traffic (AADT) of 6,930 vehicles on a section of highway between Alum Creek Drive and Groveport Road. The road curves northeast, before curving due north. The highway heads through the west side of Groveport. In Groveport, the road has becomes a four-lane divided highway.

The route leaves Groveport heading north, still passing through industrial properties, with some commercial properties. The highway enters Columbus city limits and has an interchange with US 33. After US 33, the highway becomes a four-lane undivided roadway, passing through residential properties. The highway leaves Columbus and reenters the city, before passing under Interstate 270 (I–270). After passing under I–270, SR 317 passes the Eastland Mall, on the west side of the road. The road continues north passes through commercial properties, having an interchange with I–70. SR 317 continues north and enters Whitehall. The route passes through residential properties, before passing through commercial properties. The highway has an intersections with both US 40 and SR 16 in Whitehall. The road leaves Whitehall and reenters Columbus, by passing under Columbus and Ohio River Railroad tracks.

After passing under the railroad tracks, SR 317 passes to the east of John Glenn Columbus International Airport. The road has an interchange with I–270, at the northeast corner of the airport. North of I–270, SR 317 leaves Columbus for the final time and it enters Gahanna. Between I–270 and Rocky Fork Boulevard, SR 317 has its highest AADT at 36,870 vehicles. The highway continues north passing through residential, on the west side of the road, and commercial properties, on the east side of the road. The highway makes a sharp curve, turning due west, and passes through commercial properties. SR 317 end at a T-intersection with US 62 in Gahanna, SR 317 enters the intersection from the east and US 62 enters from the west and north. The highway is not incorporated within the National Highway System.

== History ==
SR 317 was original route certified in 1932. The original route was from SR 16 in Whitehall to Gahanna. In 1936, the section of SR 317 between US 23 and Groveport, was commissioned as SR 665. Between 1959 and 1962, SR 317 was extended south to US 33 along previously unnumbered road. In 1972, the route was extended south to the eastern terminus of SR 665 in Groveport. One year later, in 1973, SR 317 replaced SR 665 from US 23 to Groveport.

== Major intersections ==
The entire route is in Franklin County.

Location	mi	km	Destinations	Notes
Hamilton Township	0.00	0.00	US 23 / SR 665 west	Southern terminus of SR 317; eastern terminus of SR 665
Columbus	9.14	14.71	US 33	
Columbus	12.42	19.99	I-70	I-70 west exit 107, east exits 107A-B.
Whitehall	13.75	22.13	US 40	
Whitehall	15.19	24.45	SR 16	
Gahanna	17.20	27.68	I-270	I-270 exit 37.
Gahanna	18.87	30.37	US 62	Northern terminus
1.000 mi = 1.609 km; 1.000 km = 0.621 mi
