= Brown Township, Ohio =

Brown Township, Ohio, may refer to:

- Brown Township, Carroll County, Ohio
- Brown Township, Darke County, Ohio
- Brown Township, Delaware County, Ohio
- Brown Township, Franklin County, Ohio
- Brown Township, Knox County, Ohio
- Brown Township, Miami County, Ohio
- Brown Township, Paulding County, Ohio
- Brown Township, Vinton County, Ohio
