= Melrose, Ohio =

- Village
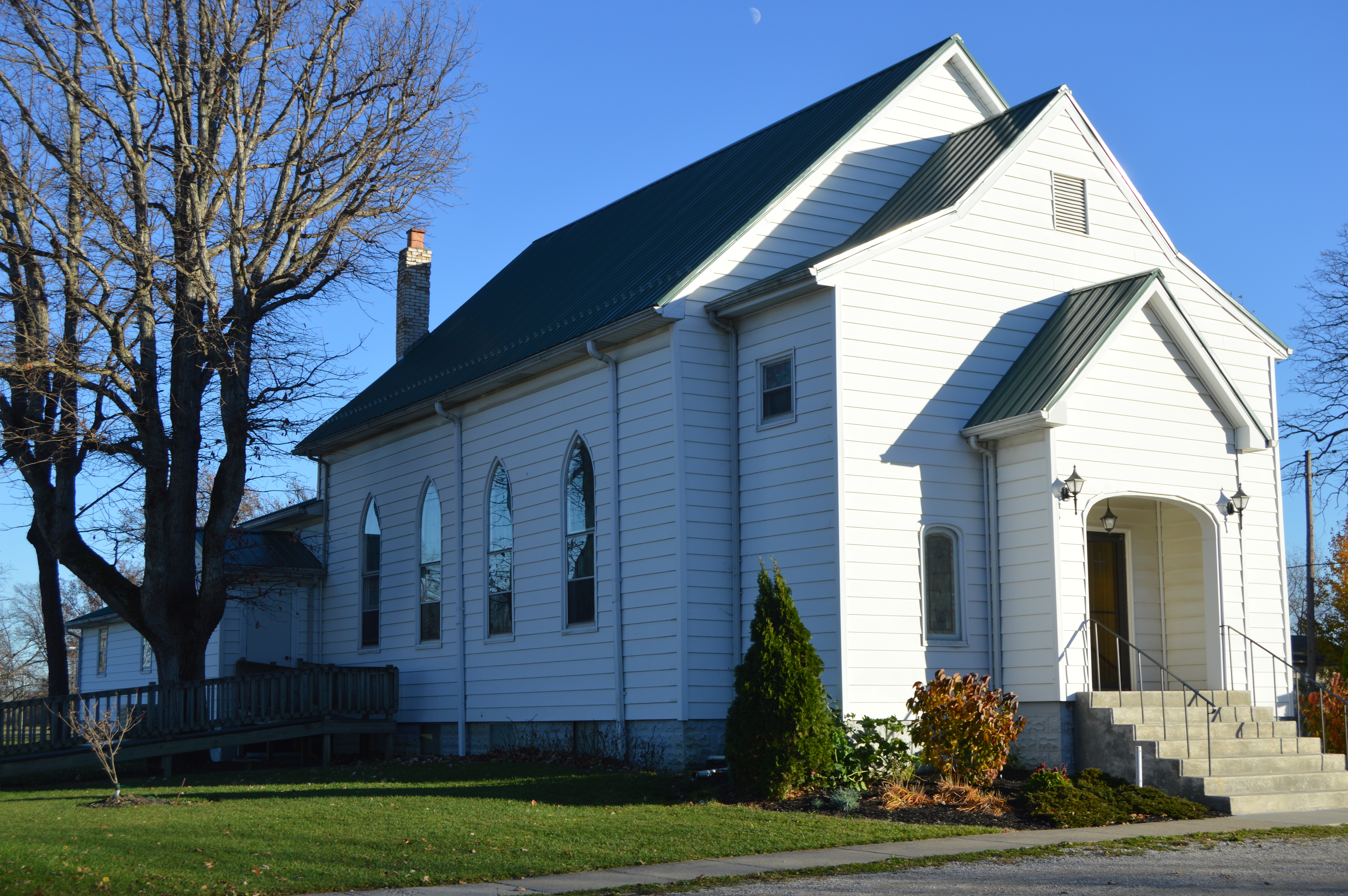
- United Methodist Church of Melrose

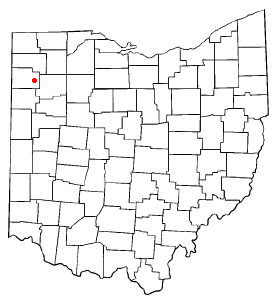
- Location of Melrose, Ohio

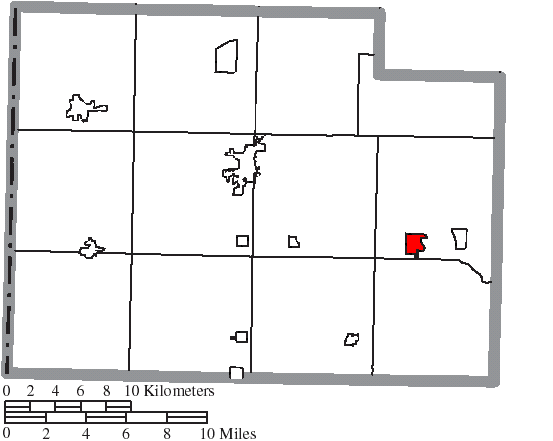
- Location of Melrose in Paulding County
- Coordinates: 41°05′19″N 84°25′12″W
- Country: United States
- State: Ohio
- County: Paulding
- Township: Brown

Government
  - Mayor: Dustin Dotson

Area
  - Total: 0.86 sq mi (2.22 km^{2})
  - Land: 0.86 sq mi (2.22 km^{2})
  - Water: 0 sq mi (0.00 km^{2})
- Elevation: 715 ft (218 m)

Population (2020)
  - Total: 233
  - Density: 272.1/sq mi (105.06/km^{2})
- Time zone: UTC-5 (Eastern (EST))
  - Summer (DST): UTC-4 (EDT)
- ZIP codes: 45861, 45873
- Area code: 419
- FIPS code: 39-49000
- GNIS feature ID: 2399307

Melrose is a village in Paulding County, Ohio, United States. The population was 233 at the 2020 census.

== Geography ==
According to the United States Census Bureau, the village has a total area of 0.86 square miles (2.23 km^{2}). All of it is land (there are no bodies of water).

== Demographics ==
Historical population
Census	Pop.	Note	%±
1890	430		—
1900	383		−10.9%
1910	317		−17.2%
1920	238		−24.9%
1930	188		−21.0%
1940	249		32.4%
1950	237		−4.8%
1960	260		9.7%
1970	302		16.2%
1980	315		4.3%
1990	307		−2.5%
2000	322		4.9%
2010	275		−14.6%
2020	233		−15.3%
U.S. Decennial Census

=== 2010 census ===
As of the census of 2010, there were 275 people, 102 households, and 76 families living in the village. The population density was 319.8 inhabitants per square mile (123.5/km^{2}). There were 114 housing units at an average density of 132.6 per square mile (51.2/km^{2}). The racial makeup of the village was 99.3% White, 0.4% Asian, and 0.4% from two or more races. Hispanic or Latino of any race were 2.5% of the population.

There were 102 households, of which 42.2% had children under the age of 18 living with them, 48.0% were married couples living together, 17.6% had a female householder with no husband present, 8.8% had a male householder with no wife present, and 25.5% were non-families. 19.6% of all households were made up of individuals, and 6.9% had someone living alone who was 65 years of age or older. The average household size was 2.70 and the average family size was 3.05.

The median age in the village was 33.8 years. 30.5% of residents were under the age of 18; 6.6% were between the ages of 18 and 24; 22.5% were from 25 to 44; 28.3% were from 45 to 64; and 12% were 65 years of age or older. The gender makeup of the village was 48.4% male and 51.6% female.

=== 2000 census ===
As of the census of 2000, there were 322 people, 111 households, and 83 families living in the village. The population density was 374.4 inhabitants per square mile (144.6/km^{2}). There were 124 housing units at an average density of 144.2 per square mile (55.7/km^{2}). The racial makeup of the village was 97.83% White, 2.17% from other races. Hispanic or Latino of any race were 2.17% of the population.

There were 111 households, out of which 42.3% had children under the age of 18 living with them, 53.2% were married couples living together, 13.5% had a female householder with no husband present, and 25.2% were non-families. 18.0% of all households were made up of individuals, and 8.1% had someone living alone who was 65 years of age or older. The average household size was 2.90 and the average family size was 3.35.

In the village, the population was spread out, with 31.1% under the age of 18, 14.9% from 18 to 24, 29.5% from 25 to 44, 16.1% from 45 to 64, and 8.4% who were 65 years of age or older. The median age was 28 years. For every 100 females there were 95.2 males. For every 100 females aged 18 and over, there were 94.7 males.

The median income for a household in the village was $33,750, and the median income for a family was $39,688. Males had a median income of $36,250 versus a female median income of $19,375. The per capita income for the village was $13,484. About 11.3% of families and 14.5% of the population were below the poverty line, including 22.7% of those under age 18 and 21.9% of those age 65 or over.
