= Oakwood, Paulding County, Ohio =

Oakwood, Ohio
- Village
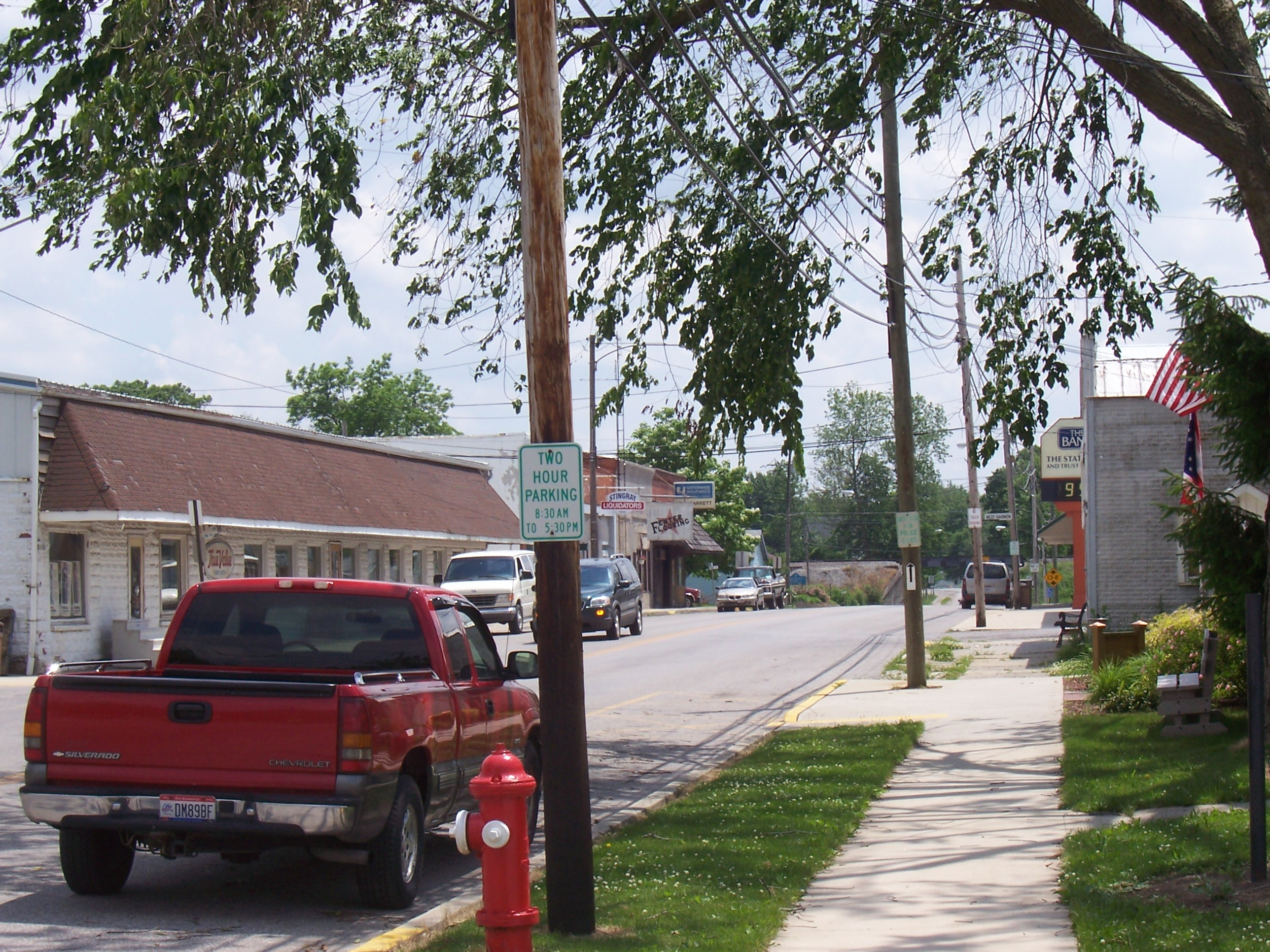
- Downtown Oakwood

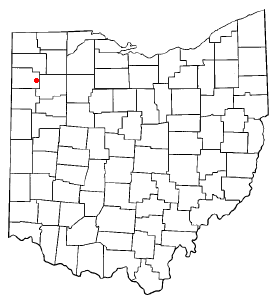
- Location of Oakwood, Paulding County, Ohio

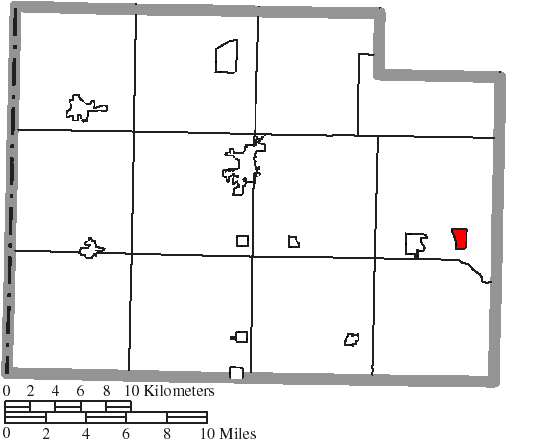
- Location of Oakwood in Paulding County
- Coordinates: 41°05′35″N 84°22′37″W
- Country: United States
- State: Ohio
- County: Paulding
- Township: Brown

Area
  - Total: 0.70 sq mi (1.82 km^{2})
  - Land: 0.70 sq mi (1.82 km^{2})
  - Water: 0 sq mi (0.00 km^{2})
- Elevation: 715 ft (218 m)

Population (2020)
  - Total: 546
  - Density: 777.4/sq mi (300.17/km^{2})
- Time zone: UTC-5 (Eastern (EST))
  - Summer (DST): UTC-4 (EDT)
- ZIP code: 45873
- Area code: 419
- FIPS code: 39-57792
- GNIS feature ID: 2399546

Oakwood is a village in Paulding County, Ohio, United States. The population was 546 at the 2020 census.

== Geography ==
According to the United States Census Bureau, the village has a total area of 0.59 square miles (1.53 km^{2}), all land.

== Demographics ==
Historical population
Census	Pop.	Note	%±
1880	23		—
1890	378		1,543.5%
1900	342		−9.5%
1910	496		45.0%
1920	443		−10.7%
1930	452		2.0%
1940	466		3.1%
1950	542		16.3%
1960	686		26.6%
1970	804		17.2%
1980	886		10.2%
1990	709		−20.0%
2000	607		−14.4%
2010	608		0.2%
2020	546		−10.2%
U.S. Decennial Census

=== 2010 census ===
As of the census of 2010, there were 608 people, 228 households, and 159 families living in the village. The population density was 1,030.5 inhabitants per square mile (397.9/km^{2}). There were 248 housing units at an average density of 420.3 per square mile (162.3/km^{2}). The racial makeup of the village was 96.9% White, 0.2% Native American, 0.8% from other races, and 2.1% from two or more races. Hispanic or Latino of any race were 4.3% of the population.

There were 228 households, of which 36.8% had children under the age of 18 living with them, 48.2% were married couples living together, 12.7% had a female householder with no husband present, 8.8% had a male householder with no wife present, and 30.3% were non-families. 25.0% of all households were made up of individuals, and 9.7% had someone living alone who was 65 years of age or older. The average household size was 2.67 and the average family size was 3.16.

The median age in the village was 33.4 years. 28.1% of residents were under the age of 18; 8.8% were between the ages of 18 and 24; 28.3% were from 25 to 44; 20.2% were from 45 to 64; and 14.5% were 65 years of age or older. The gender makeup of the village was 50.3% male and 49.7% female.

=== 2000 census ===
As of the census of 2000, there were 607 people, 236 households, and 172 families living in the village. The population density was 1,037.0 inhabitants per square mile (400.4/km^{2}). There were 263 housing units at an average density of 449.3 per square mile (173.5/km^{2}). The racial makeup of the village was 98.85% White, 0.16% Asian, 0.16% from other races, and 0.82% from two or more races. Hispanic or Latino of any race were 0.16% of the population.

There were 236 households, out of which 31.8% had children under the age of 18 living with them, 57.2% were married couples living together, 12.7% had a female householder with no husband present, and 26.7% were non-families. 23.7% of all households were made up of individuals, and 10.6% had someone living alone who was 65 years of age or older. The average household size was 2.57 and the average family size was 3.07.

In the village, the population was spread out, with 27.8% under the age of 18, 6.9% from 18 to 24, 28.2% from 25 to 44, 25.9% from 45 to 64, and 11.2% who were 65 years of age or older. The median age was 36 years. For every 100 females there were 86.8 males. For every 100 females age 18 and over, there were 86.4 males.

The median income for a household in the village was $35,250, and the median income for a family was $43,750. Males had a median income of $34,500 versus $21,786 for females. The per capita income for the village was $15,273. About 8.0% of families and 10.9% of the population were below the poverty line, including 16.2% of those under age 18 and 6.9% of those age 65 or over.

== Education ==
Oakwood has a public library, a branch of the Paulding County Library.
