= Norwich Township, Franklin County, Ohio =

Township in Ohio, US

- Township
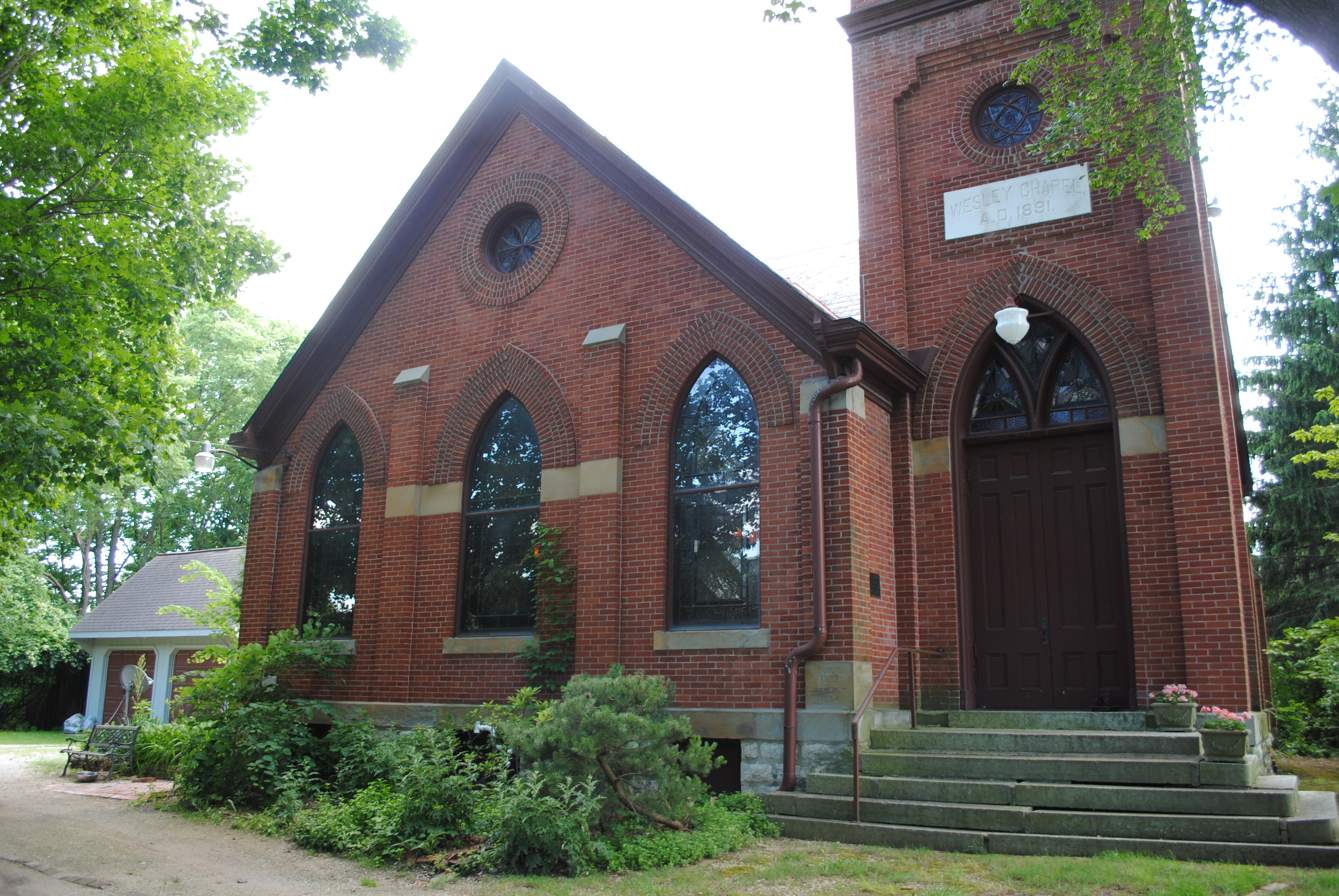
- Wesley Chapel near Hilliard

- Location of Norwich Township in Franklin County.
- Coordinates: 40°1′49″N 83°8′13″W
- Country: United States
- State: Ohio
- County: Franklin

Area
  - Total: 14.3 sq mi (37 km^{2})
  - Land: 14.2 sq mi (37 km^{2})
  - Water: 0.2 sq mi (0.52 km^{2})
- Elevation: 909 ft (277 m)

Population (2020)
  - Total: 37,900
  - Density: 2,670/sq mi (1,030/km^{2})
- Time zone: UTC-5 (Eastern (EST))
  - Summer (DST): UTC-4 (EDT)
- FIPS code: 39-57344
- GNIS feature ID: 1086109

Norwich Township is one of the seventeen townships of Franklin County, Ohio, United States. The 2020 census found 37,900 people in the township.

== Geography ==
Located in the western part of the county, it is composed of several small "islands", separated due to municipal annexations. These islands border the following townships and cities:

- Washington Township - north
- Columbus - east
- Hilliard - south
- Brown Township - west

Most of Norwich Township has been annexed by the cities of Columbus (the county seat of Franklin County), in the south, and Hilliard, in the north.

== Name and history ==
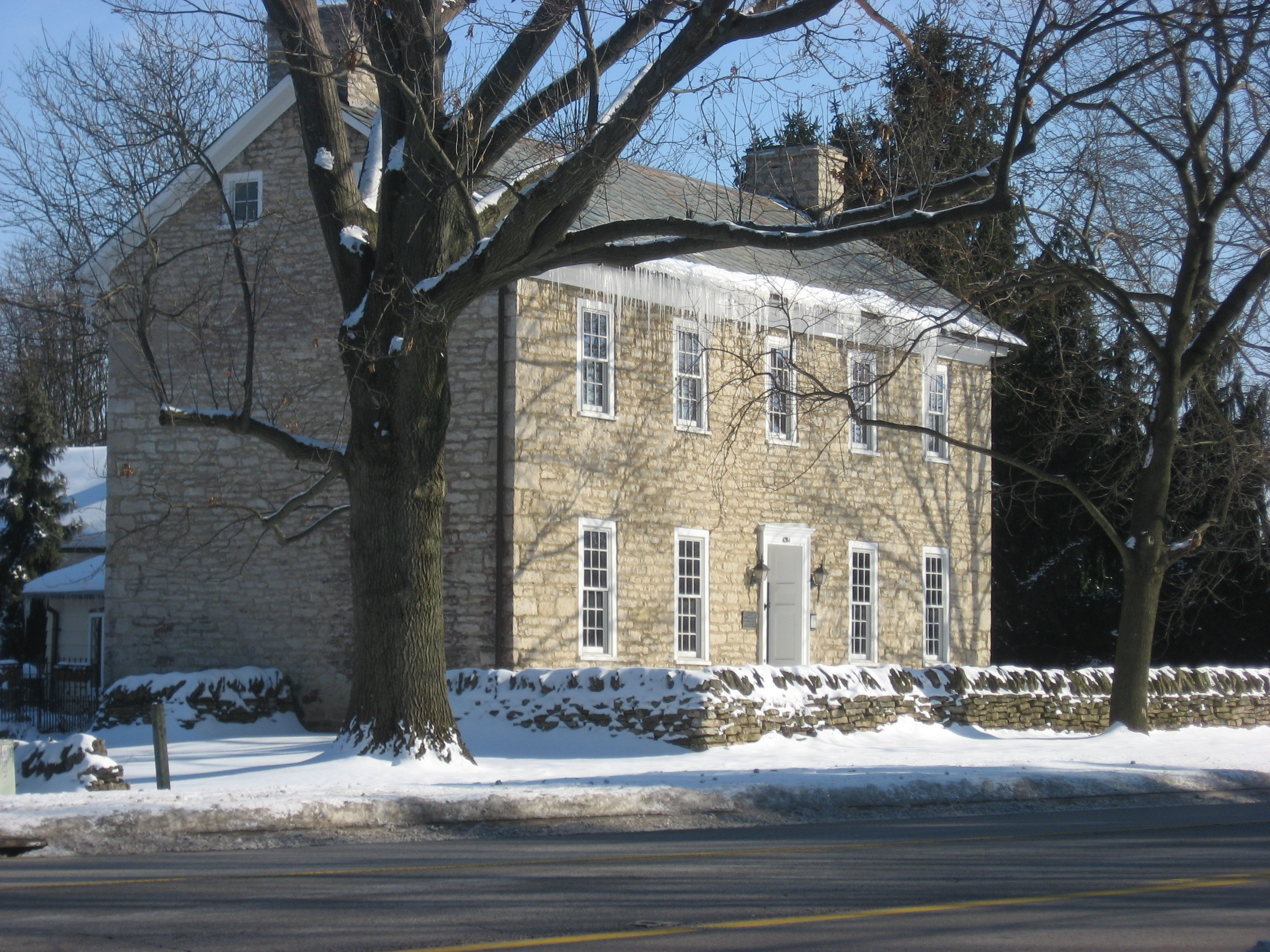
Samuel Davis House

Statewide, the only other Norwich Township is located in Huron County.

Norwich Township was founded in 1813. It was named by Thomas Backus, a prominent early resident and native of Norwich, Connecticut.

== Government ==
The township is governed by a three-member board of trustees, who are elected in November of odd-numbered years to a four-year term beginning on the following January 1. Two are elected in the year after the presidential election and one is elected in the year before it. There is also an elected township fiscal officer, who serves a four-year term beginning on April 1 of the year after the election, which is held in November of the year before the presidential election. Vacancies in the fiscal officership or on the board of trustees are filled by the remaining trustees.

== Education ==
All areas of this township are in the Hilliard City School District.
