= Amlin, Ohio =

- Unincorporated community
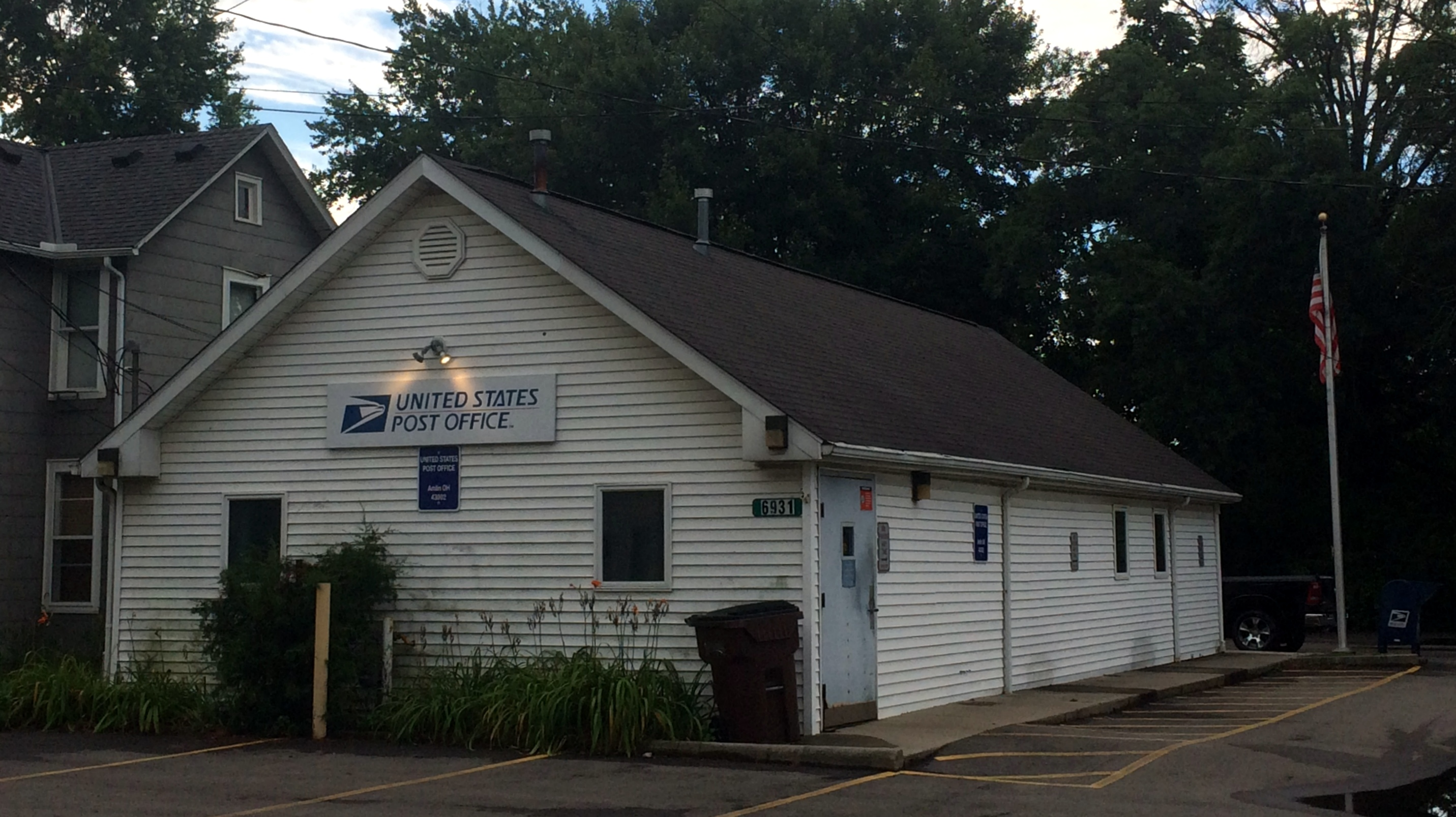
- The Former Post Office in Amlin, Ohio

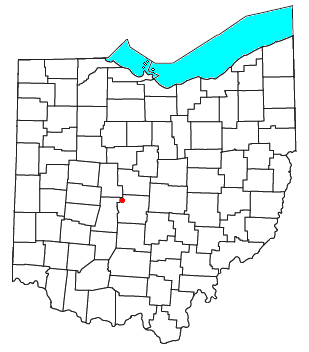
- Location of Amlin, Ohio
- Coordinates: 40°04′37″N 83°10′52″W
- Country: United States
- State: Ohio
- County: Franklin
- Township: Washington
- Elevation: 945 ft (288 m)
- Time zone: UTC-5 (Eastern (EST))
  - Summer (DST): UTC-4 (EDT)
- ZIP codes: 43002
- GNIS feature ID: 1064322

Amlin is an unincorporated community in southwestern Washington Township, Franklin County, Ohio, United States. It has the ZIP code 43002.

== History ==
Amlin was laid out in 1847 by Zeloria E. Amlin, and named for him after starting a farm at Amlin Station.

In April 2026, the community's post office closed after the owner of the property decided not to renew the lease after it expired in November 2024. Operations were consolidated into a Dublin office.
