= Brown Township, Miami County, Ohio =

Township in Ohio, US

- Township
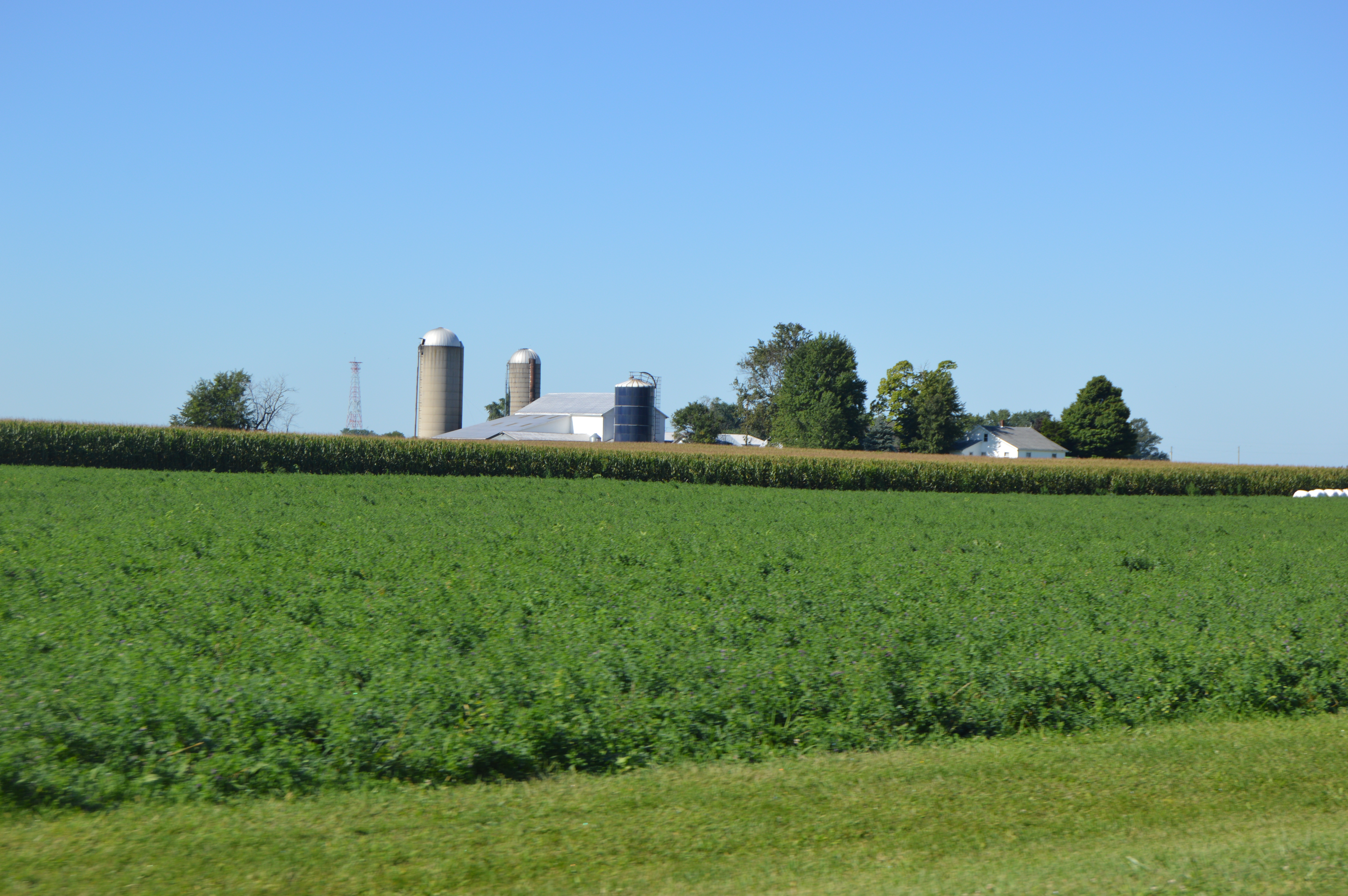
- Farm northeast of Fletcher

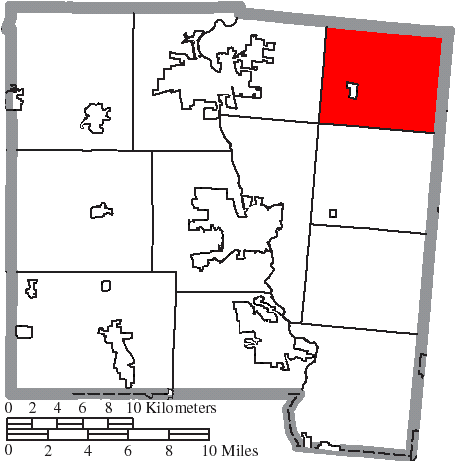
- Location of Brown Township in Miami County
- Coordinates: 40°9′4″N 84°5′36″W
- Country: United States
- State: Ohio
- County: Miami

Area
  - Total: 30.2 sq mi (78.3 km^{2})
  - Land: 30.2 sq mi (78.3 km^{2})
  - Water: 0 sq mi (0.0 km^{2})
- Elevation: 1,047 ft (319 m)

Population (2020)
  - Total: 1,585
  - Density: 52.4/sq mi (20.2/km^{2})
- Time zone: UTC-5 (Eastern (EST))
  - Summer (DST): UTC-4 (EDT)
- FIPS code: 39-09498
- GNIS feature ID: 1086635

Brown Township is one of the twelve townships of Miami County, Ohio, United States. The 2020 census found 1,585 people in the township.

== Geography ==
Located in the northeastern edge of the county, it borders the following townships:

- Green Township, Shelby County - north
- Johnson Township, Champaign County - northeast
- Jackson Township, Champaign County - southeast
- Lostcreek Township - south
- Staunton Township - southwest corner
- Springcreek Township - west
- Orange Township, Shelby County - northwest

The village of Fletcher is located in the southwest quadrant of Brown Township, and the unincorporated community of Conover lies in the township's east.

== Name and history ==
Brown Township was organized in 1819. It is one of eight Brown Townships statewide.

== Government ==
The township is governed by a three-member board of trustees, who are elected in November of odd-numbered years to a four-year term beginning on the following January 1. Two are elected in the year after the presidential election and one is elected in the year before it. There is also an elected township fiscal officer, who serves a four-year term beginning on April 1 of the year after the election, which is held in November of the year before the presidential election. Vacancies in the fiscal officership or on the board of trustees are filled by the remaining trustees.

Meetings are typically held on the second and fourth Mondays of the month at 7PM local time. In the case of holidays, the trustees will decide a later date. They are held at 7735 Alcony-Conover Rd, Fletcher, OH 45326
