= Brown Township, Franklin County, Ohio =

Township in Ohio, US

- Township
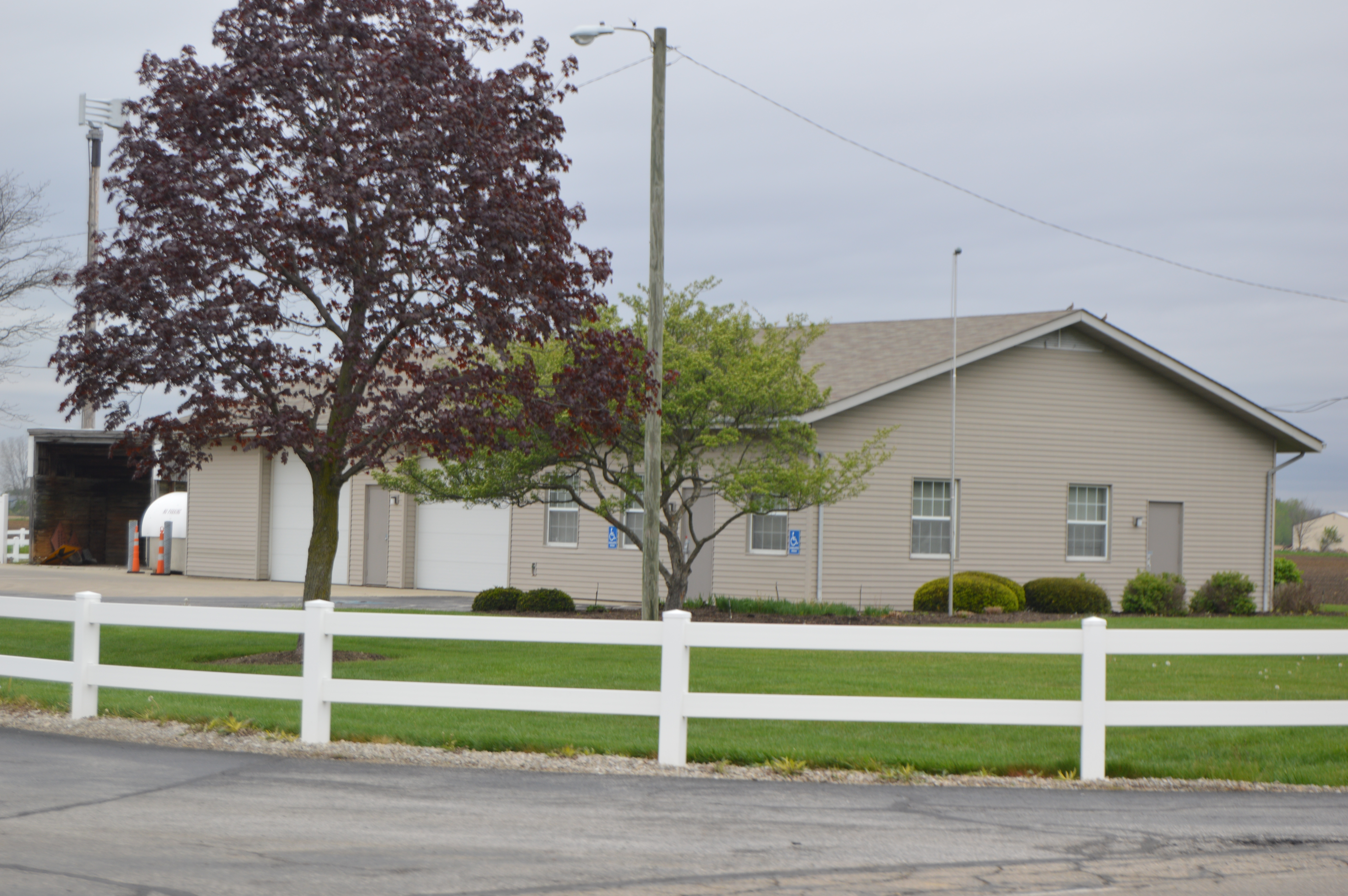
- Township hall

- Logo

- Location of Brown Township in Franklin County.
- Coordinates: 40°0′11″N 83°13′40″W
- Country: United States
- State: Ohio
- County: Franklin

Area
  - Total: 21.7 sq mi (56 km^{2})
  - Land: 21.4 sq mi (55 km^{2})
  - Water: 0.2 sq mi (0.52 km^{2})
- Elevation: 942 ft (287 m)

Population (2020)
  - Total: 3,886
  - Density: 182/sq mi (70.1/km^{2})
- Time zone: UTC-5 (Eastern (EST))
  - Summer (DST): UTC-4 (EDT)
- FIPS code: 39-09442
- GNIS feature ID: 1086099
- Website: www.browntwp.org

Brown Township is one of the 17 townships of Franklin County, Ohio, United States. The 2020 census lists 3,886 people.

== Geography ==
Located in the western part of the county, Brown borders the following townships:

- Washington Township - northeast
- Norwich Township - east
- Prairie Township - south
- Jefferson Township, Madison County - southwest
- Canaan Township, Madison County - northwest

A small part of the city of Hilliard is located in northeastern Brown Township, and part of the census-designated place of Lake Darby lies in the township's southwest.

== Name and history ==
It is one of eight Brown Townships statewide.

== Government ==
The township is governed by a board of trustees whose three members are elected in November of odd-numbered years to a four-year term beginning on the following January 1. Two board members are elected in the year after the presidential election, and one is elected in the year before the election. There is also a fiscal officer elected who serves a four-year term beginning on April 1 of the year after the election, which is held in November of the year before the presidential election. Vacancies in the fiscal officership or on the board of trustees are filled by the remaining trustees.

== Education ==
All areas of Brown Township are situated within the boundaries of the Hilliard City School District.
