= Lake Darby, Ohio =

- Census-designated place
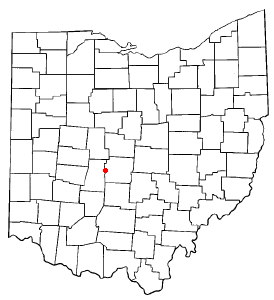
- Location of Lake Darby, Ohio
- Coordinates: 39°57′55″N 83°14′25″W
- Country: United States
- State: Ohio
- County: Franklin
- Townships: Prairie, Brown

Area
  - Total: 3.50 sq mi (9.06 km^{2})
  - Land: 3.46 sq mi (8.97 km^{2})
  - Water: 0.039 sq mi (0.10 km^{2})
- Elevation: 929 ft (283 m)

Population (2020)
  - Total: 4,731
  - Density: 1,366.8/sq mi (527.71/km^{2})
- Time zone: UTC-5 (Eastern (EST))
  - Summer (DST): UTC-4 (EDT)
- FIPS code: 39-41363
- GNIS feature ID: 2393078

Lake Darby is an unincorporated community and census-designated place in Franklin County, Ohio, United States, located mostly in Prairie Township and partly in Brown Township. It is more commonly known among locals as Darby Estates, which is also the name of the older housing development there, with the newer development called "West Point". As of the 2020 census, the CDP had a population of 4,731.

== Geography ==
Lake Darby is located in western Franklin County. The majority of the community is in Prairie Township, with two portions extending north into Brown Township. Big Darby Creek, a tributary of the Scioto River, forms the western border of the CDP as well as the Franklin County/Madison County line. The village of West Jefferson lies directly across the creek from Lake Darby.

U.S. Route 40 (National Road), a four-lane highway, forms the southern edge of the community, leading east 13 miles (21 km) to downtown Columbus and west 31 miles (50 km) to Springfield, Ohio.

According to the United States Census Bureau, the Lake Darby CDP has a total area of 3.5 square miles (9.1 km^{2}), of which 3.5 square miles (9.0 km^{2}) is land and 0.04 square miles (0.1 km^{2}), or 1.15%, is water.

== Namesake ==
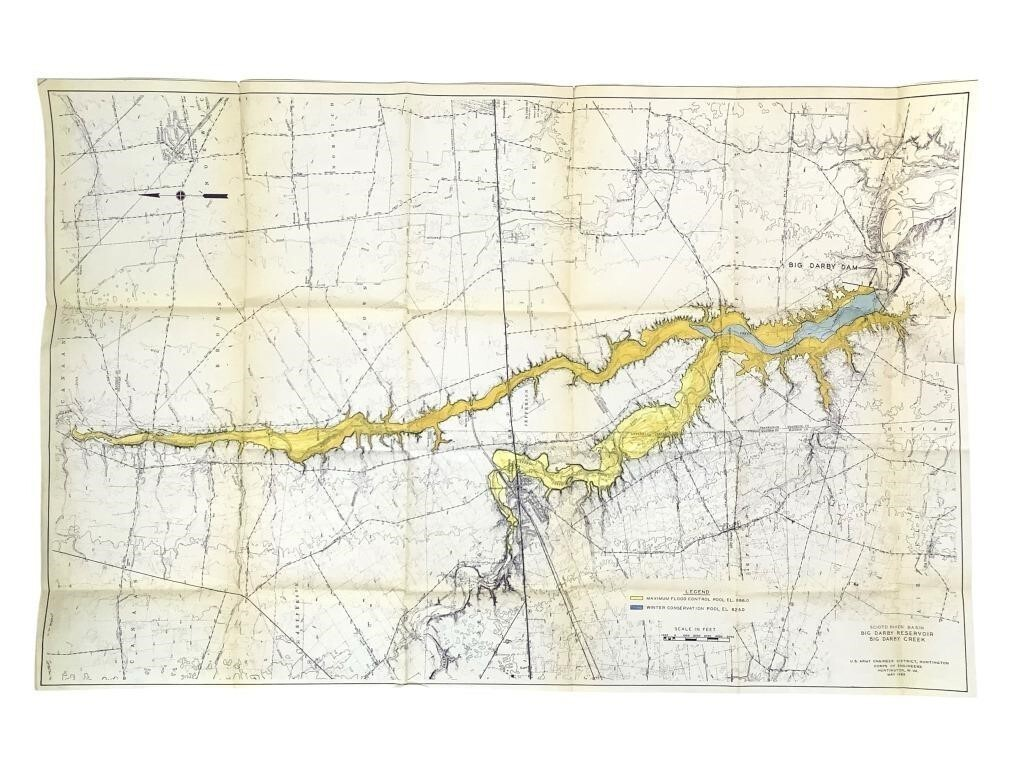
Map of the proposed reservoir

While the origins of its name are speculative, it can be inferred what Lake Darby was named for. In 1967, The Columbus Dispatch published an article about how the City of Columbus had plans to purchase nearly 4,000 acres of land near Big Darby Creek to build a reservoir. With Lake Darby beginning construction sometime in the mid-to-late 1960s, it can be presumed that the neighborhood took its namesake from the proposed reservoir. The reservoir, however, was never built. Environmental concerns and other factors caused the project to be abandoned by the Army Core of Engineers sometime in the 1970s. Despite the project being fully abandoned, the residential neighborhood never had its name changed.

== Demographics ==
Historical population
Census	Pop.	Note	%±
2020	4,731		—
U.S. Decennial Census

=== 2020 census ===
As of the 2020 census, the median age was 33.5 years. 30.6% of residents were under the age of 18 and 7.6% of residents were 65 years of age or older. For every 100 females there were 96.6 males, and for every 100 females age 18 and over there were 97.8 males age 18 and over.

90.0% of residents lived in urban areas, while 10.0% lived in rural areas.

There were 1,534 households in Lake Darby, of which 47.5% had children under the age of 18 living in them. Of all households, 65.2% were married-couple households, 11.9% were households with a male householder and no spouse or partner present, and 15.8% were households with a female householder and no spouse or partner present. About 12.7% of all households were made up of individuals and 3.8% had someone living alone who was 65 years of age or older.

There were 1,555 housing units, of which 1.4% were vacant. The homeowner vacancy rate was 0.5% and the rental vacancy rate was 0.0%.

Racial composition as of the 2020 census
Race	Number	Percent
White	3,981	84.1%
Black or African American	121	2.6%
American Indian and Alaska Native	10	0.2%
Asian	81	1.7%
Native Hawaiian and Other Pacific Islander	1	0.0%
Some other race	158	3.3%
Two or more races	379	8.0%
Hispanic or Latino (of any race)	316	6.7%

=== 2000 census ===
As of the census of 2000, there were 3,727 people, 1,198 households, and 1,041 families residing in the CDP. The population density was 1,094.4 inhabitants per square mile (422.6/km^{2}). There were 1,238 housing units at an average density of 363.5 per square mile (140.3/km^{2}). The racial makeup of the CDP was 94.18% White, 1.91% African American, 0.35% Native American, 0.56% Asian, 0.03% Pacific Islander, 0.86% from other races, and 2.12% from two or more races. Hispanic or Latino of any race were 1.56% of the population.

There were 1,198 households, out of which 53.6% had children under the age of 18 living with them, 72.6% were married couples living together, 10.4% had a female householder with no husband present, and 13.1% were non-families. 10.1% of all households were made up of individuals, and 0.5% had someone living alone who was 65 years of age or older. The average household size was 3.10 and the average family size was 3.31.

The population was spread out, with 33.9% under the age of 18, 6.1% from 18 to 24, 40.5% from 25 to 44, 17.3% from 45 to 64, and 2.0% who were 65 years of age or older. The median age was 30 years. For every 100 females there were 97.0 males. For every 100 females age 18 and over, there were 97.8 males.

The median income for a household in the CDP was $61,843, and the median income for a family was $61,474. Males had a median income of $36,293 versus $30,385 for females. The per capita income for the CDP was $23,079. About 1.1% of families and 1.9% of the population were below the poverty line, including 2.4% of those under age 18 and none of those age 65 or over.

== Education ==
The southern portion is in the South-Western City School District, and the northern portion is in the Hilliard City School District.
