= Washington Township, Franklin County, Ohio =

Township in Ohio, US

- Township
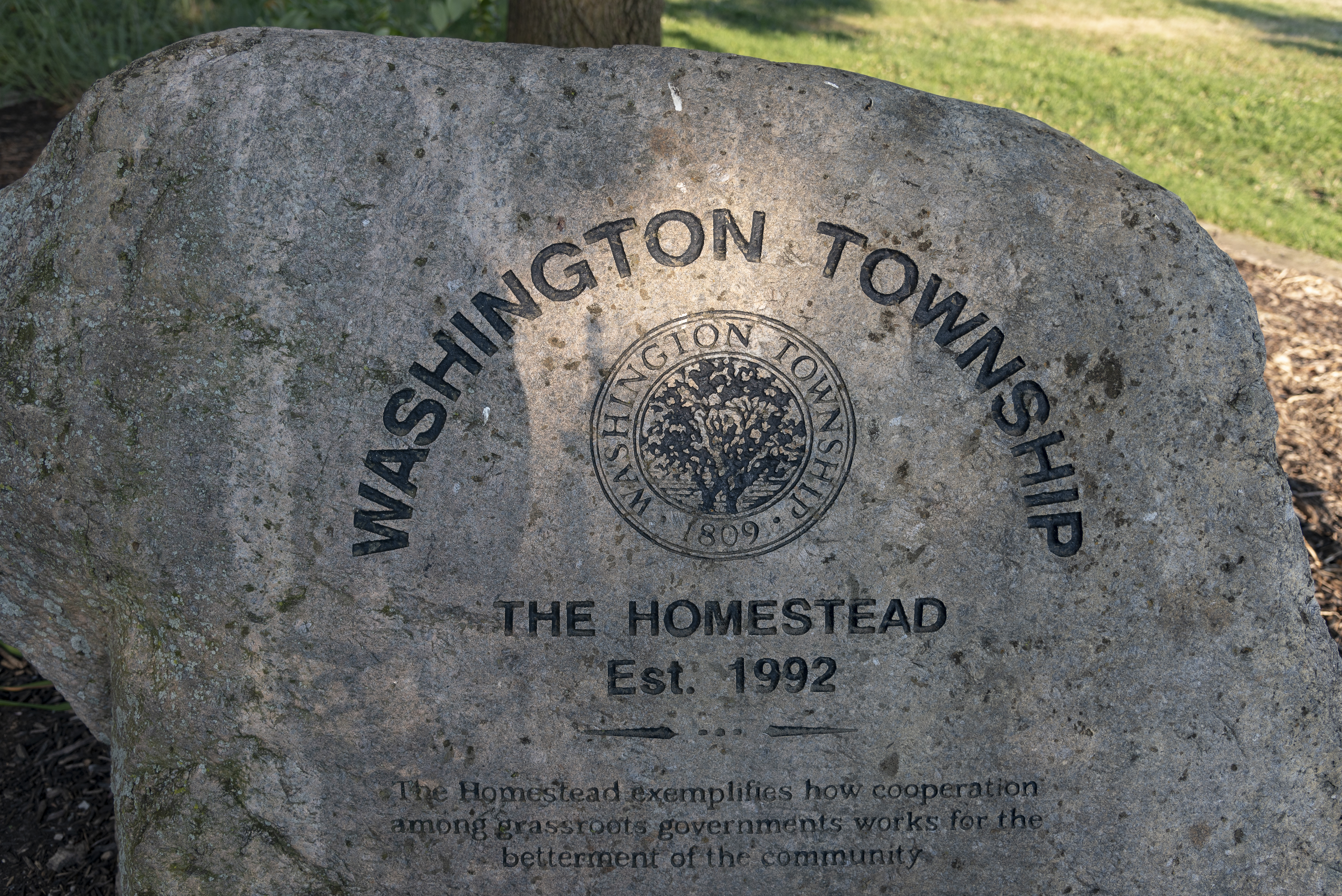

- Location of Washington Township in Franklin County.
- Coordinates: 40°4′17″N 83°9′37″W
- Country: United States
- State: Ohio
- County: Franklin, Delaware, Union

Area
  - Total: 27.5 sq mi (71 km^{2})
- Elevation: 906 ft (276 m)

Population (2020)
  - Total: 43,593
  - Density: 1,590/sq mi (612/km^{2})
- Time zone: UTC-5 (Eastern (EST))
  - Summer (DST): UTC-4 (EDT)
- FIPS code: 39-81242
- GNIS feature ID: 1086117
- Website: www.wtwp.com

Washington Township is one of the seventeen townships of Franklin County, Ohio, United States. It also includes portions of Delaware County and Union County within the city of Dublin. The population was 43,593 at the 2020 census.

In 1991, the Supreme Court of Ohio ruled that the city of Dublin was permitted to include the entire territory of the city in Washington Township, including areas outside of Franklin County.

== Geography ==
Located in the northwestern corner of the county, it borders the following townships and cities:

- Dublin - northeast
- Hilliard - southeast
- Brown Township - southwest, east of Canaan Township
- Canaan Township, Madison County - southwest, west of Brown Township
- Darby Township, Madison County - west
- Jerome Township, Union County - northwest

Several small exclaves of the township are located within the city of Dublin.

Much of eastern Washington Township is occupied by the city of Dublin, and the city of Hilliard includes a small part of southern Washington Township. As well, the unincorporated community of Amlin lies in the southwestern part of the township.

== Name and history ==
It is one of forty-three Washington Townships statewide.

== Government ==
The township is governed by a three-member board of trustees, who are elected in November of odd-numbered years to a four-year term beginning on the following January 1. Two are elected in the year after the presidential election and one is elected in the year before it. There is also an elected township fiscal officer, who serves a four-year term beginning on April 1 of the year after the election, which is held in November of the year before the presidential election. Vacancies in the fiscal officership or on the board of trustees are filled by the remaining trustees.

== Education ==
Some areas of this township are in the Hilliard City School District.

Others are part of Dublin City Schools.
