= Oakland, Franklin County, Ohio =

Community in Franklin County, Ohio, US

Oakland, Ohio
- Unincorporated community
- Location within Ohio
- Coordinates: 40°03′05″N 82°46′39″W
- Country: United States
- State: Ohio
- Counties: Franklin
- Elevation: 1,073 ft (327 m)
- Time zone: UTC-5 (Eastern (EST))
  - Summer (DST): UTC-4 (EDT)
- ZIP code: 43054
- Area code: 614
- GNIS feature ID: 1059944

Oakland is an unincorporated community in Plain Township, Franklin County, Ohio, United States. It is located southeast of New Albany at the intersection of Morse Road and Babbitt Road.
