= Bexley City School District =

School district in Ohio

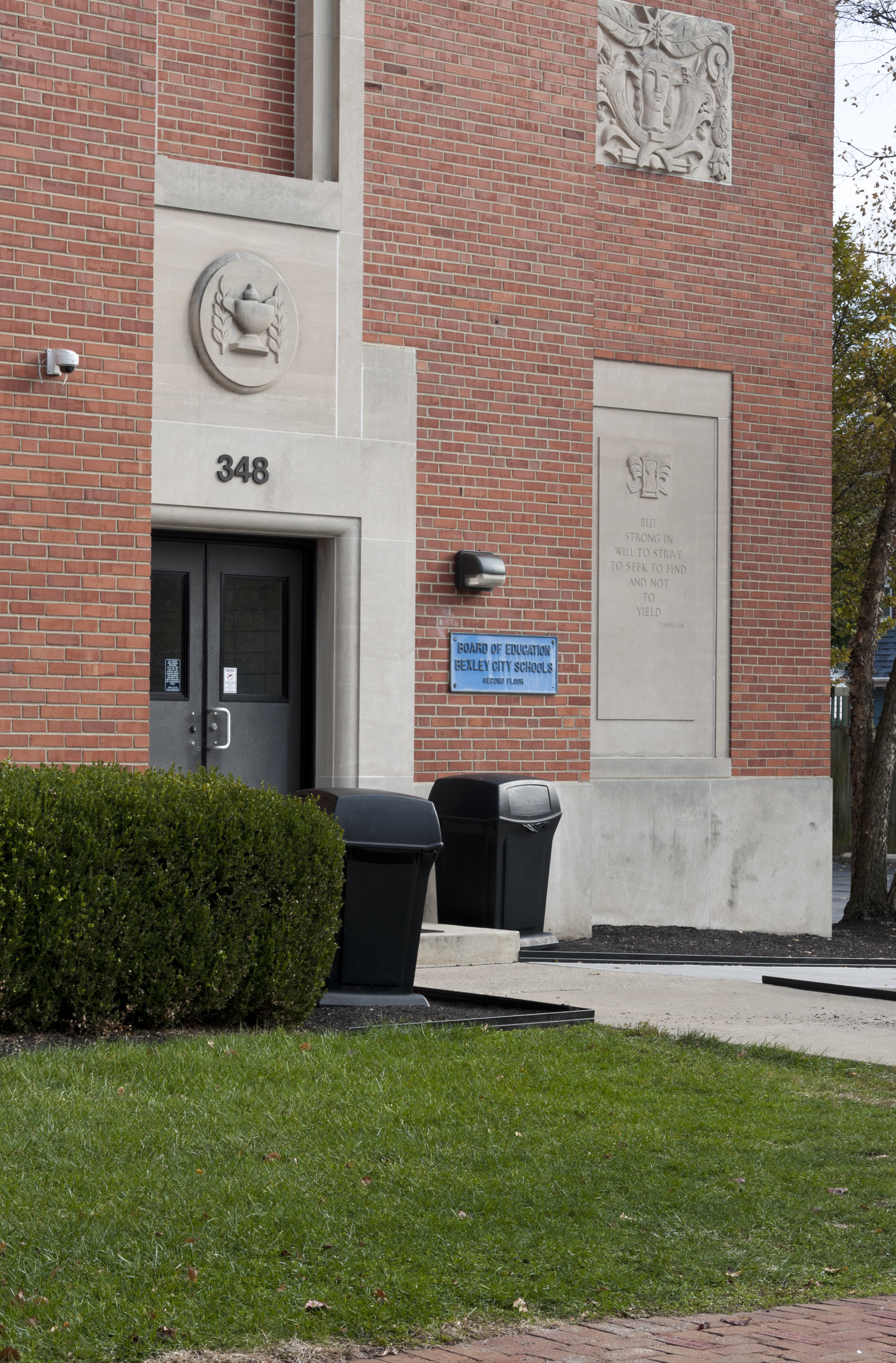
Board of Education Office

The Bexley City School District is located in Bexley, Ohio and contains five schools. The largest school is Bexley High School. There is also one Middle School attached to the high school called Bexley Middle School. There are a total of three elementary schools, one for each section of Bexley. The first school is named Montrose Elementary School for the children who live in south Bexley. The children who live in central Bexley go to Cassingham Elementary, which is also attached to the high school and middle school. The last group of people who live in Bexley, the north go to Maryland Elementary.

Bexley High School is a public high school in Bexley. The principal of Bexley High School is Dr. Harley Williams. 735 students go to Bexley High School and identify primarily as White, non-Hispanic; Black, non-Hispanic; and Hispanic. 5% of the 735 students here are classified as "economically disadvantaged", and 14% have subsidized lunches. The student to teacher ratio at Bexley High School is 14:1.
