= Brown Township, Paulding County, Ohio =

Township in Ohio, US

- Township
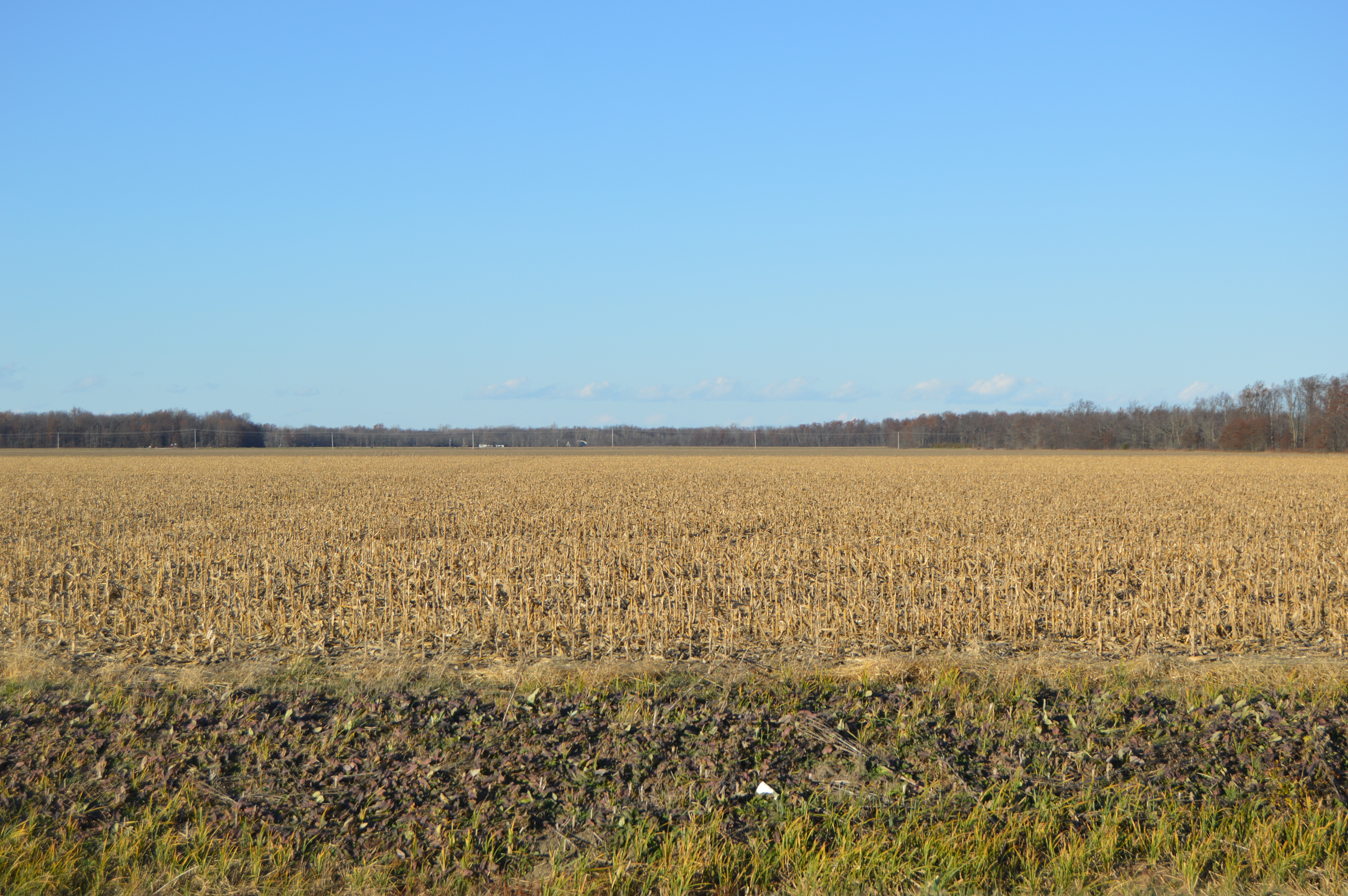
- Farm fields west of Melrose

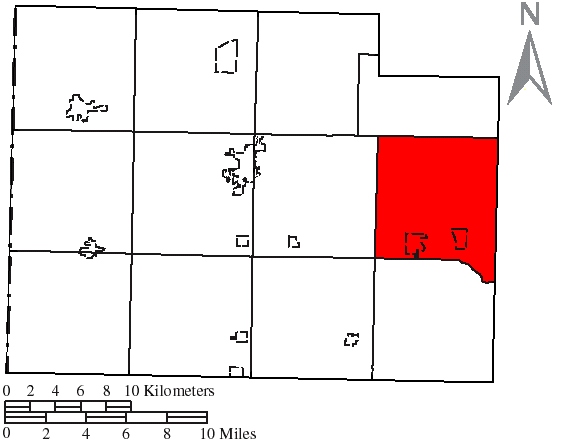
- Location of Brown Township in Paulding County
- Coordinates: 41°6′28″N 84°23′28″W
- Country: United States
- State: Ohio
- County: Paulding

Area
  - Total: 37.7 sq mi (97.7 km^{2})
  - Land: 37.2 sq mi (96.3 km^{2})
  - Water: 0.54 sq mi (1.4 km^{2})
- Elevation: 702 ft (214 m)

Population (2020)
  - Total: 1,924
  - Density: 52/sq mi (20/km^{2})
- Time zone: UTC-5 (Eastern (EST))
  - Summer (DST): UTC-4 (EDT)
- FIPS code: 39-09512
- GNIS feature ID: 1086769

Brown Township is one of the twelve townships of Paulding County, Ohio, United States. The 2020 census found 1,924 people in the township.

== Geography ==
Located in the eastern part of the county, it borders the following townships:

- Auglaize Township - north
- Highland Township, Defiance County - northeast corner
- Monroe Township, Putnam County - east
- Perry Township, Putnam County - southeast
- Washington Township - south
- Latty Township - southwest corner
- Jackson Township - west

Two villages are located in Brown Township: Melrose in the southwestern part of the township, and Oakwood in the southeastern part of the township.

== Name and history ==
It is one of eight Brown Townships statewide.

== Government ==
The township is governed by a three-member board of trustees, who are elected in November of odd-numbered years to a four-year term beginning on the following January 1. Two are elected in the year after the presidential election and one is elected in the year before it. There is also an elected township fiscal officer, who serves a four-year term beginning on April 1 of the year after the election, which is held in November of the year before the presidential election. Vacancies in the fiscal officership or on the board of trustees are filled by the remaining trustees.
