= Brown Township, Douglas County, Missouri =

Township in Missouri, U.S.

Coordinates: 36°50′41″N 92°28′29″W

Brown Township is a township in southern Douglas County, in the U.S. state of Missouri.
