= Africa (disambiguation) =

Africa is the world's second largest continent.

Africa may also refer to:

== Arts and entertainment ==
=== Film and television ===
- Africa (1930 film), an American animated short featuring Oswald the Lucky Rabbit
- África (film), 1996 Spanish film
- Africa (2011 film), an Iranian crime drama
- Africa (2019 film), an Israeli drama
- Africa (1984 TV series), a Channel 4 documentary series
- Africa (2013 TV series), a BBC documentary series
- "Africa", (also known as "Antelopes"), a Series A episode of the television series QI (2003)

=== Music ===
==== Classical music ====
- "Africa" (William Billings), an 18th-century hymn tune
- Africa (Saint-Saëns), an 1891 fantasia by Camille Saint-Saëns
- Africa (Still), a 1930 symphonic poem

==== Albums ====
- Africa (Miriam Makeba album), a 1991 compilation album
- Africa (Perpetuum Jazzile album), 2009
- Africa (Pharoah Sanders album), 1987
- Africa, a 1975 album by Amanaz

==== Songs ====
- "Africa" (song), 1982 song by Toto, later covered by Weezer
  - "Africa" (Karl Wolf song), a 2007 song inspired by the Toto song
- "Africa" (Lost Fields song), 2019
- "Africa" (Rose Laurens song), 1982, also released as "Africa (Voodoo Master)"
- "Africa", by D'Angelo from his 2000 album Voodoo
- "Africa", by E-Type from his 2001 album Euro IV Ever
- "Africa", by Hall & Oates from their 1980 album Voices
- "Africa", by The Knack from their 1981 album Round Trip
- "África", by Locomía from their 1991 album Loco Vox
- "Africa", by The Meters from their 1974 album Rejuvenation
  - "Hollywood (Africa)", a cover by the Red Hot Chili Peppers, 1985
- "Africa", by Toto Cutugno, on which song "L'Été indien (Africa)" was based
- "Africa", by Yemi Alade from her 2016 album Mama Africa

=== Other uses in arts and entertainment ===
- Africa (Petrarch), a 14th-century epic poem
- Africa (journal), an academic journal
- Africa (Italian journal), an academic journal from Italy
- Africa (game), a 1977 wargame

== Places ==
- Africa (Roman province), a province of the Roman Empire
  - Kingdom of Africa
- Africa, Indiana, U.S.
- Africa, Ohio, U.S.

== Media ==
=== Television channels ===
- Africa2Africa, a defunct South African television channel
- Africa Independent Television, a Nigerian television channel
- Africanews, a pan-African television news channel
- RTP África, a television channel
- SABC Africa, a defunct South African television channel
- Télé Africa, a Gabonese television channel
- TV Africa, a Ghanaian television channel
- TVI África, a defunct television channel
- Televisão África, a Cape Verdan television channel

=== Other ===
- African Barter Company, a defunct South African media company
- African Broadcast Network, a defunct African television network
- Africa Radio, a French-language radio station
- AllAfrica, a news portal
- Channel Africa
- TVAfrica, a defunct South African media company

== Other uses ==
- Africa (surname), including a list of people with the name
- África (given name), including a list of people with the name
- Africa (goddess)
- 1193 Africa, an asteroid
- Honda Africa Twin, a motorcycle
- HMS Africa, the name of several ships
- Africa Safari Adventure Park, in Costa Rica

== See also ==
- Afrika (disambiguation)
- Africa '70 (disambiguation)
- Africa U.S.A. (disambiguation)
- African (disambiguation)
- African Union, a union of African states
- Africatown, a historic community in Mobile, Alabama, U.S.
- Ifriqiya, the area in medieval history of today's eastern Algeria, Tunisia and western Libya
- Republic of New Afrika, an American black nationalist and separatist organization
- Scipio Africanus (disambiguation)
- The Americas
