= África (given name) =

- Pronunciation: [/ˈafɾika/]
- Gender: Feminine
- Language: Spanish, Catalan

Origin
- Origin: Latin
- Meaning: Africa and the Virgin Mary
- Region of origin: Spain

Other names
- Variant form: Àfrica

África is a Spanish feminine given name which refers to the continent of Africa. In Catalan it is spelled Àfrica with a grave accent.

The name is a shortening of María de África, which is derived from the Virgin Mary's epithet as Nuestra Señora de África ("Our Lady of Africa"), referring to her status as patron saint of the Spanish enclave of Ceuta on the North African coast.

Notable people with the name include:

- África Blesa (born 1956), Spanish gymnast
- África de las Heras (1909–1988), Spanish-Soviet intelligence agent
- África Lorente Castillo (1954–2020), Spanish politician
- Deyanira África Melo, Mexican sculptor
- Africa Peñalver (born 2000), Spanish model
- África Pratt (born 1946), Spanish actress and vedette
- África de la Rosa (born 1906), Filipino actress
- África Sempere (born 1992), Spanish handballer
- África Zamorano (born 1998), Spanish swimmer
- África Zavala (born 1985), Mexican actress

== See also ==
- Africa (surname)
