= Alum Creek State Park =

State park in Ohio, United States

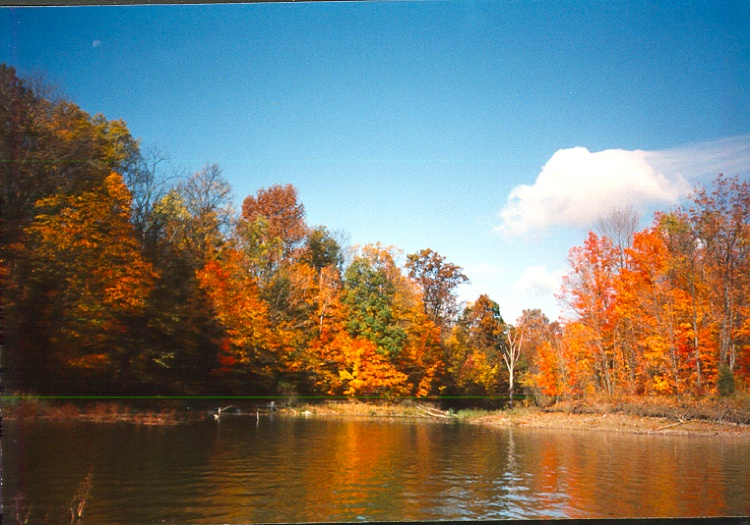
- Alum Creek State Park in autumn

- Location within Ohio Location within the United States
- Location: Delaware County, Ohio, United States
- Coordinates: 40°11′30″N 82°58′23″W
- Area: Land: 4,630 acres (1,870 ha); Water: 3,387 acres (1,371 ha)
- Elevation: 899 ft (274 m)
- Established: 1974
- Administrator: Ohio Department of Natural Resources
- Designation: Ohio state park
- Website: Alum Creek State Park

Alum Creek State Park is a 4,630-acre (1,870 ha) Ohio state park in Delaware County, Ohio, in the United States. Alum Creek Lake was constructed from 1970 to 1974 as part of the Flood Control Act of 1962. Alum Creek Dam was constructed on Alum Creek, a tributary of Big Walnut Creek, which drains into the Scioto River. Alum Creek Reservoir holds 3,387 acres (1,371 ha) of water and is open to fishing, boating, ice fishing, ice boating, and swimming. The park is just north of the state capital of Columbus and contains the remnants of a settlement by freed slaves that arrived in Ohio from North Carolina.

== History ==
=== Native Americans ===
The first evidence of man living in the Alum Creek State Park area dates back over 2,000 years ago to the Adena culture. The Adena were a Pre-Columbian Native American culture that existed from 1000 BC to 200 BC, in a time known as the early Woodland Period. The Adena culture refers to what were probably a number of related Native American societies sharing a burial complex and ceremonial system. Seven mounds were found in the Alum Creek valley and six of the mounds were excavated by archaeologists before the valley was flooded, creating Alum Creek Reservoir.

The Lenape tribe inhabited the area at the arrival of Anglo-Americans. The Lenape had originally lived along the Delaware River in what is now New York, Pennsylvania and New Jersey. They were displaced by the arriving colonial settlers and the Iroquois Indians who were the dominant group in the area. The Lenape established a large community on the banks of the Olentangy River at what is now the city of Delaware, and had a 400-acre (160 ha) corn field in what is now downtown Delaware.

=== Early settlers ===
Most of the Native Americans in Ohio were driven out or killed by the arriving Anglo settlers and military. The first permanent white settler in the area was Moses Byxbe. He built his home in 1805 along Alum Creek in Berkshire Township. He owned over 11,000 acres (45 km^{2}) of land in the area that he was able to purchase as part of the settlement program given to veterans of the American Revolutionary War.

The pioneer settlers were forced to build fortifications during the War of 1812 to protect against attack by warriors under the leadership of Tecumseh and his British allies. One such fortress, Fort Cheshire, was constructed along Alum Creek. It was two stories tall with the second story reaching over the entry to the fort thus enabling the defenders to shoot and drop boiling water on any attackers. Fort Cheshire stood until the American Civil War and was later used as a schoolhouse. A plaque commemorating the fort is located at the family campground of Alum Creek State Park.

=== Underground Railroad ===
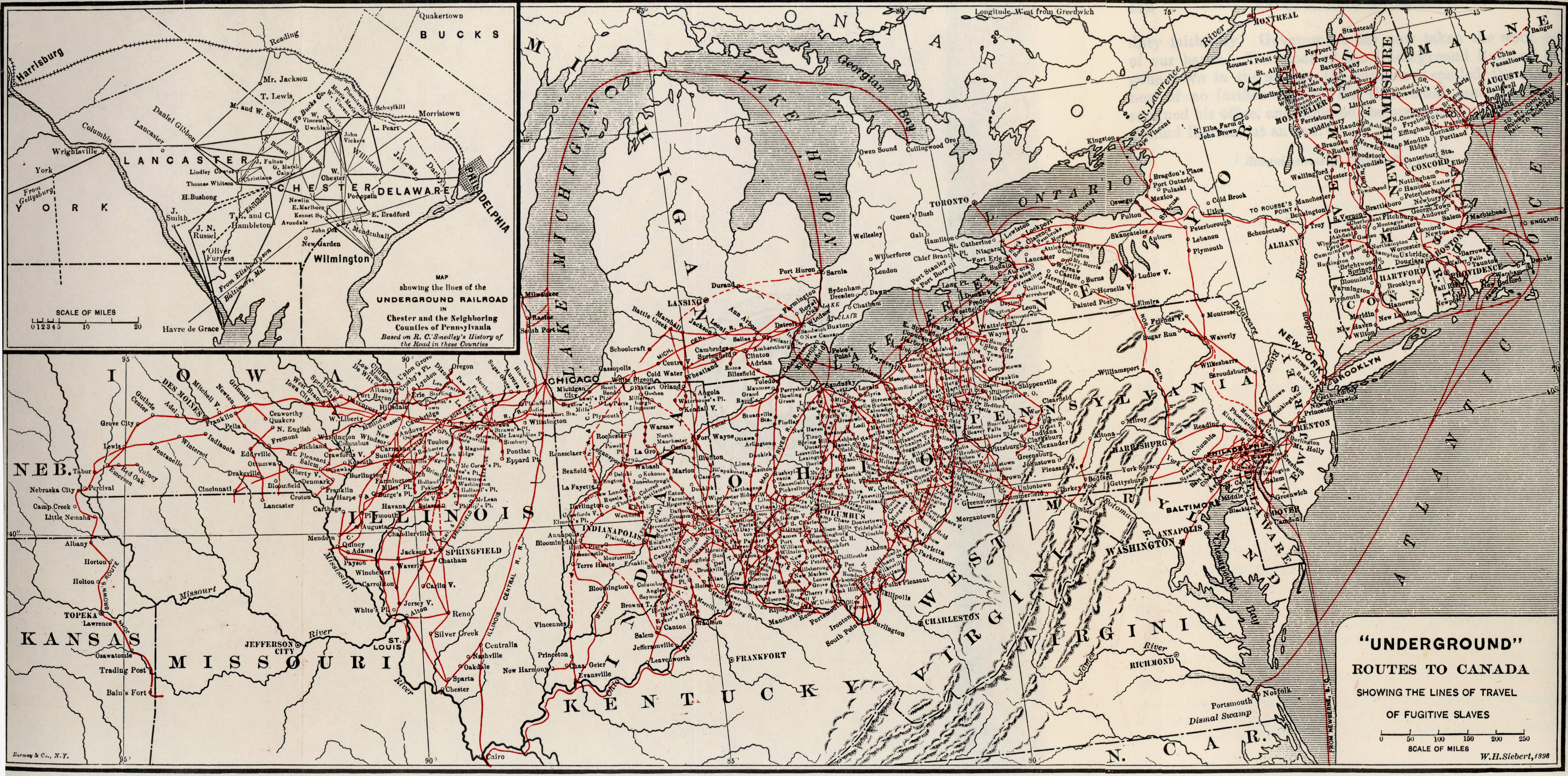
The Underground Railroad, note the numerous paths passing through Ohio

Ohio, sharing a border with the slave state of Kentucky, played an important part in freeing slavery in the United States along the Underground Railroad. A major path of the Underground Railroad ran along Alum Creek. It is thought that over 40,000 slaves passed through the area on the Sycamore Trail. The white bark of the sycamore tree provided a guide for fleeing slaves making their way north to Canada at night. The Hanby House in Westerville was an important safe house in Franklin County. Escaping slaves would wade in Alum Creek as a means of hiding their scent from pursuing dogs and slave catchers. Also, there was a settlement of former slaves from North Carolina along what became known as Africa Road on the southern end of what is now Alum Creek State Park. These former slaves also played a role in the Underground Railroad in Ohio.

=== Dam and state park ===
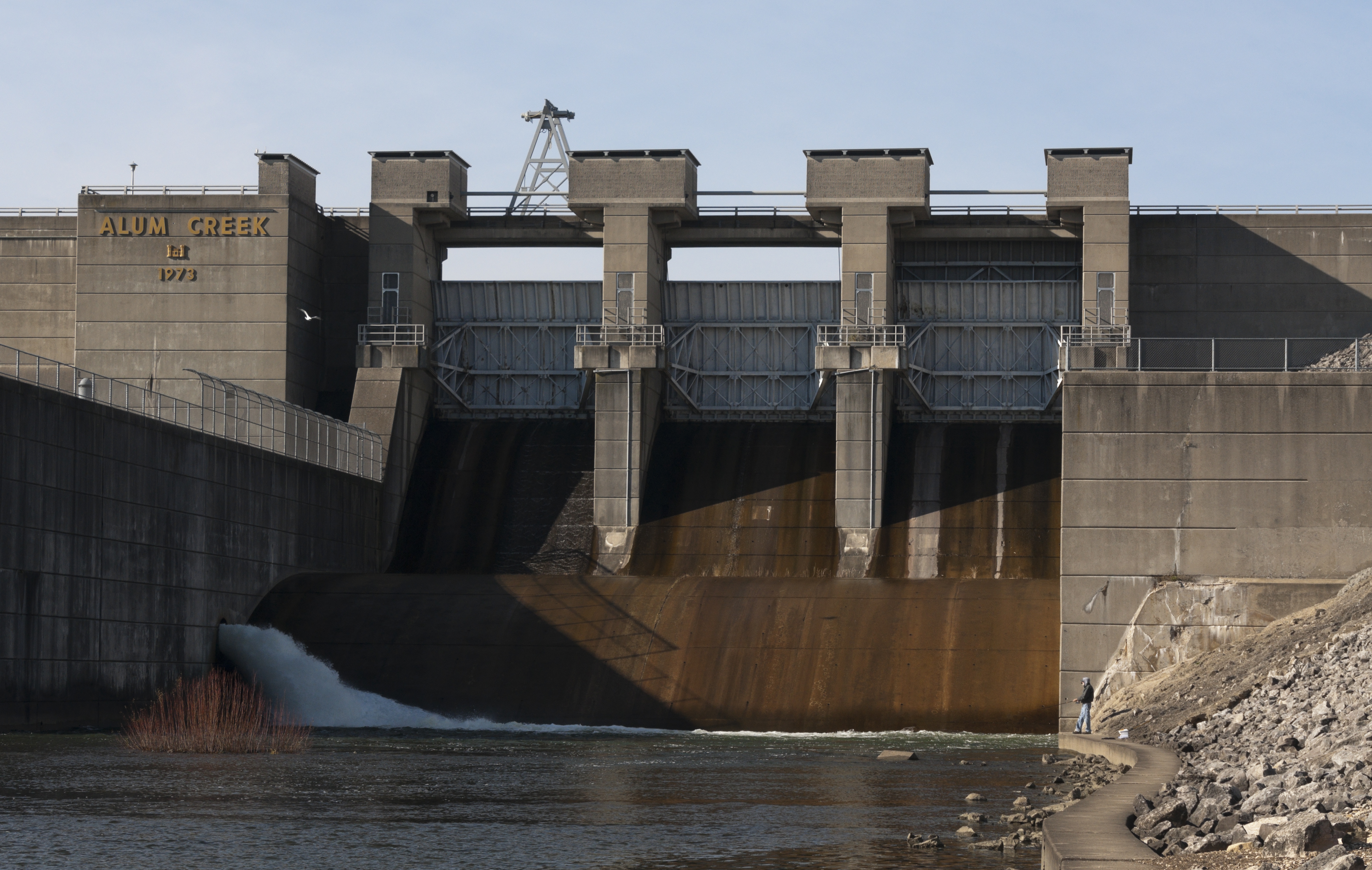
Tainter Gates and Spillway of Alum Creek Dam

Alum Creek Dam is part of the flood control plan for the Ohio River basin. Construction of the dam was authorized by the United States Congress as part of the Flood Control Act of 1962. Dam construction began in 1970 and was completed in 1974 with the establishment of Alum Creek State Park. The building of Alum Creek Dam created Alum Creek Lake, the body of water that Alum Creek State Park is adjacent to.

== Natural history ==
Alum Creek State Park is in central Ohio and is surrounded by farmlands and new housing developments. The park is home to many species of plants and animals that cannot live on the surrounding farmland. The old-growth forests of beech and maple trees were cut down for farming purposes, but in the area of the park these trees have come back to form a thriving secondary forest. Wild flower species include bloodroot, wild geranium, spring beauties and trillium. The forest provides a habitat for white-tail deer, groundhogs, fox squirrels, and rabbits.

== Recreation ==
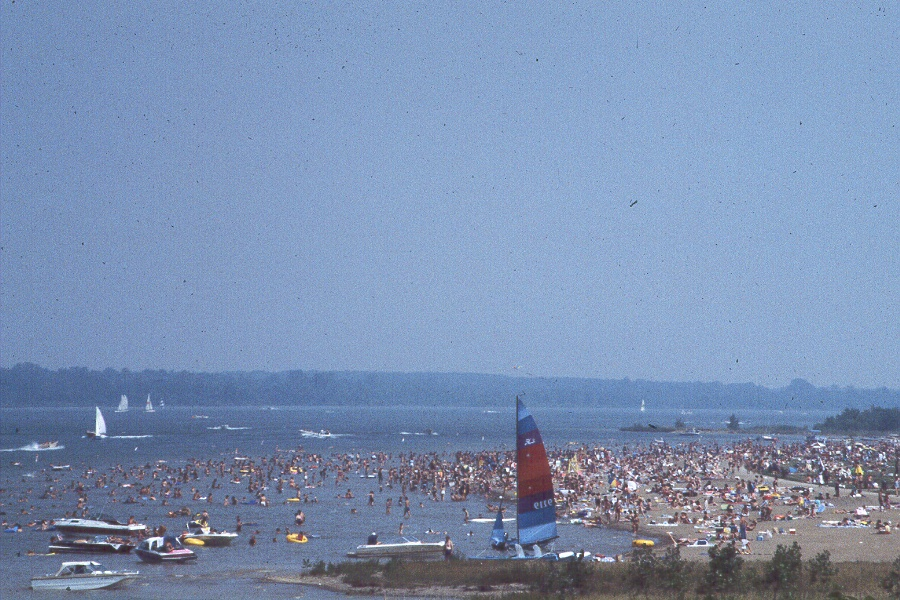
A busy day at the beach

Alum Creek State Park offers year-round recreational opportunities. Park activities include camping, hunting, hiking, picnicking, mountain biking, snowmobiling, horseback riding, RC flying, fishing, ice fishing, boating, ice boating, and swimming. There are 38 miles (61 km) of bridle trails, 7 miles (11 km) of hiking trails, and 14 miles (23 km) of mountain biking trails. The lake has five boat ramps with boats of unlimited horsepower permitted. Southeast of the dam gates is Dinneen RC Field, featuring a 900-foot long RC aircraft runway. The campground has 286 sites with electricity, showers, restroom, basketball courts, horseshoe pits and playgrounds. There are also cabins and a primitive camp along the bridle trail. The park's 3,000-foot (910 m) beach is the largest inland beach in Ohio and includes a beach house and beach volleyball courts. The lake is open to ice fishing during the winter months. Game fish found in the lake include large mouth and small mouth bass, bluegill, crappie, sunfish, channel catfish, saugeye, walleye and muskellunge. Saugeye and muskies are stocked by the State of Ohio, Division of Wildlife, and fishing tournaments are hosted throughout the year. Common game species at the park include white-tail deer, squirrels, and raccoons.
