= Afrique =

Afrique is Africa in French.

It may also refer to:

- Afrique (impressionist) (1907–1961), South African singer and impressionist, born Alexander Witkin
- Afrique (album), a 1971 album by Count Basie
- Afrique, an American R&B-jazz studio band featuring guitarist David T. Walker
- Afrique & Histoire, French peer-reviewed academic journal about African history
- Afrique Airlines, an airline in Cotonou, Benin
- Air Afrique, a Pan-African airline
- Jean Afrique, a Danish adult film actress
- SS Afrique (1907) a passenger ship that sank in the bay of Biscay in 1920

== See also ==
- Africa (disambiguation)
