= Alum Creek Lake =

Reservoir in Ohio, United States

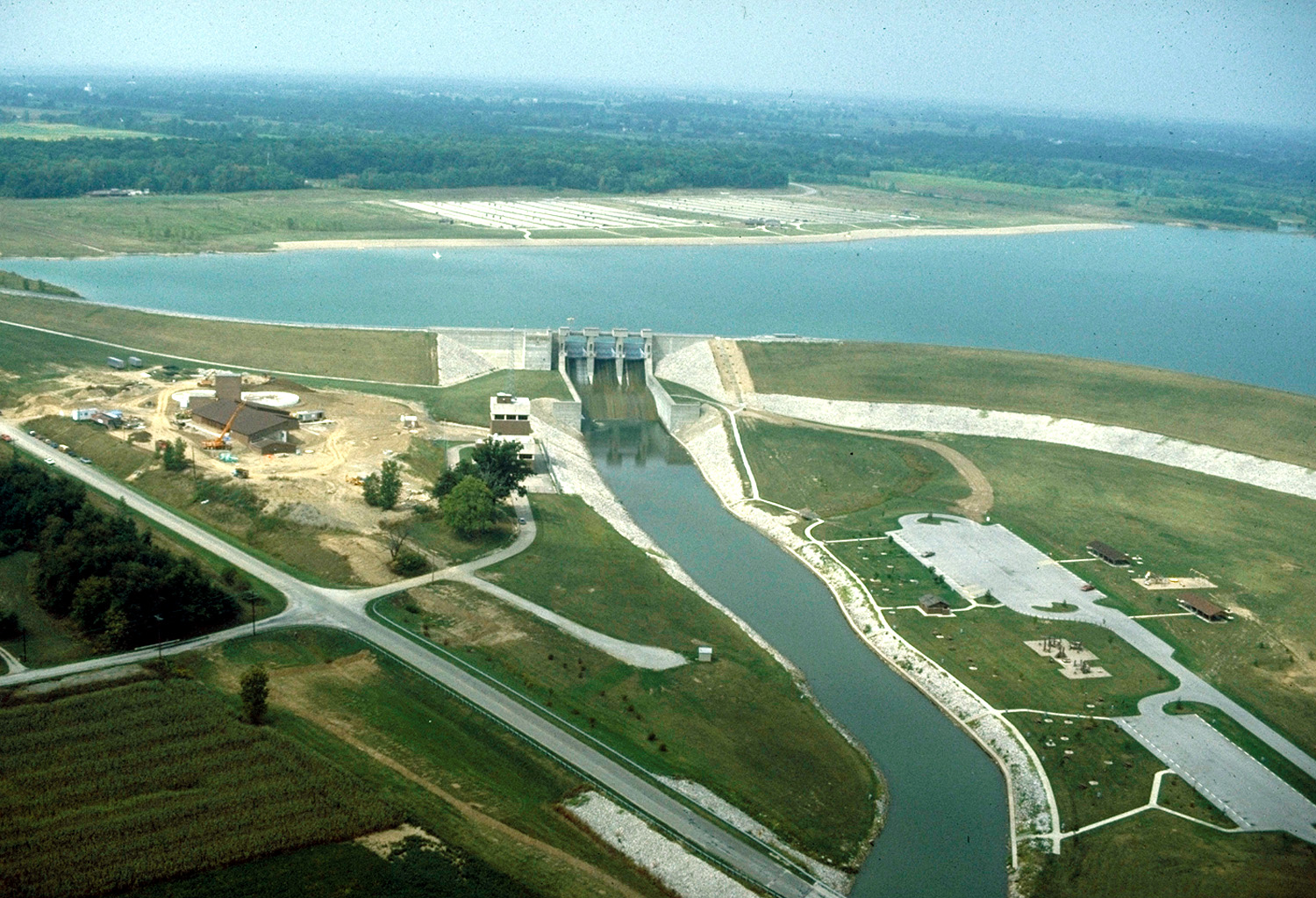
- Alum Creek Dam and Lake. View is to the northwest.

- Location within Ohio
- Location: Delaware County, Ohio
- Coordinates: 40.185718°N 82.966636°W
- Type: impound
- Primary inflows: Alum Creek
- Primary outflows: Alum Creek
- Basin countries: United States
- Built: September 1974
- Surface area: 5 sq mi (13 km^{2})
- Max. depth: 68 ft (21 m)
- Water volume: 134,815 acre⋅ft (166,292,000 m^{3})
- Surface elevation: 823 ft (251 m)

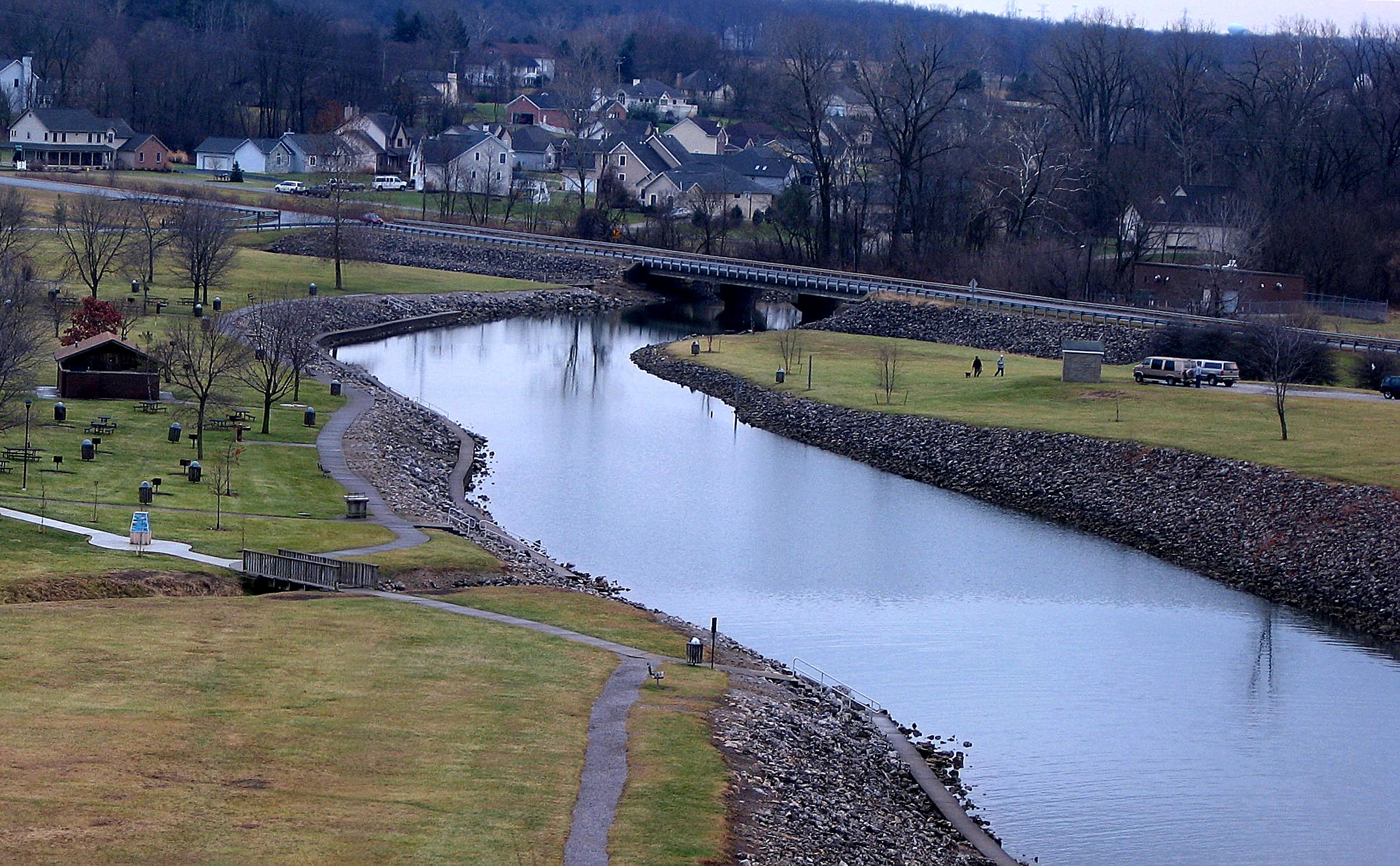
When the dam was constructed in 1974 it was out in the country. Today, modern homes reach nearly to the base of the dam. View from the top of the dam looking south.

Alum Creek Lake is a man-made reservoir located in Delaware County, Ohio, United States. It was built in 1974, covers 5 square miles (13 km^{2}), and has a maximum capacity of 134,815 acre-feet (166,292,000 m^{3}).

== Dam construction (1970–1974) ==
Alum Creek Dam was constructed between 1970 and 1974 on Alum Creek, a tributary of Big Walnut Creek, which drains into the Scioto River. The dam is a rolled earth-fill embankment 10,000 ft (3,000 m) in length with a maximum height of 93 ft (28 m). The spillway is located high on the right abutment with the raceway dropping off in front of it to the stilling basin below. Control is provided by three 34 ft (10 m) by 25 ft (7.6 m) tainter gates supported by 8 ft (2.4 m) wide concrete piers resting on concrete ogee sections. The ogee sections have a crest elevation of 878 feet (268 m) and are founded at 839 feet (256 m) elevation.

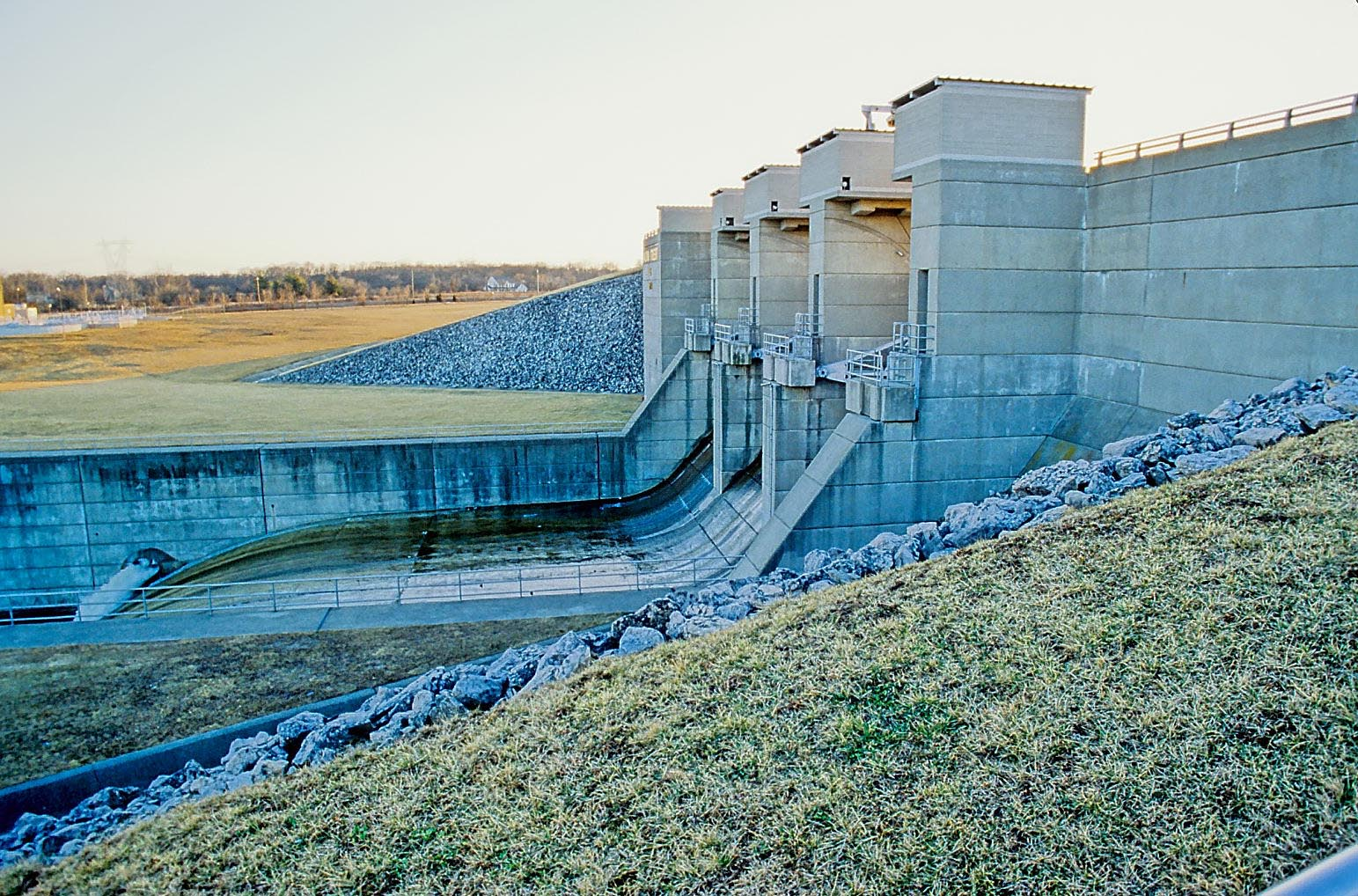
Alum Creek Dam spillway. Water is normally discharged through the hole in the far wall. Three large gates can be opened to provide emergency control under high water conditions. The retrofit cables were installed in the large flat calming section at the base of the dam.

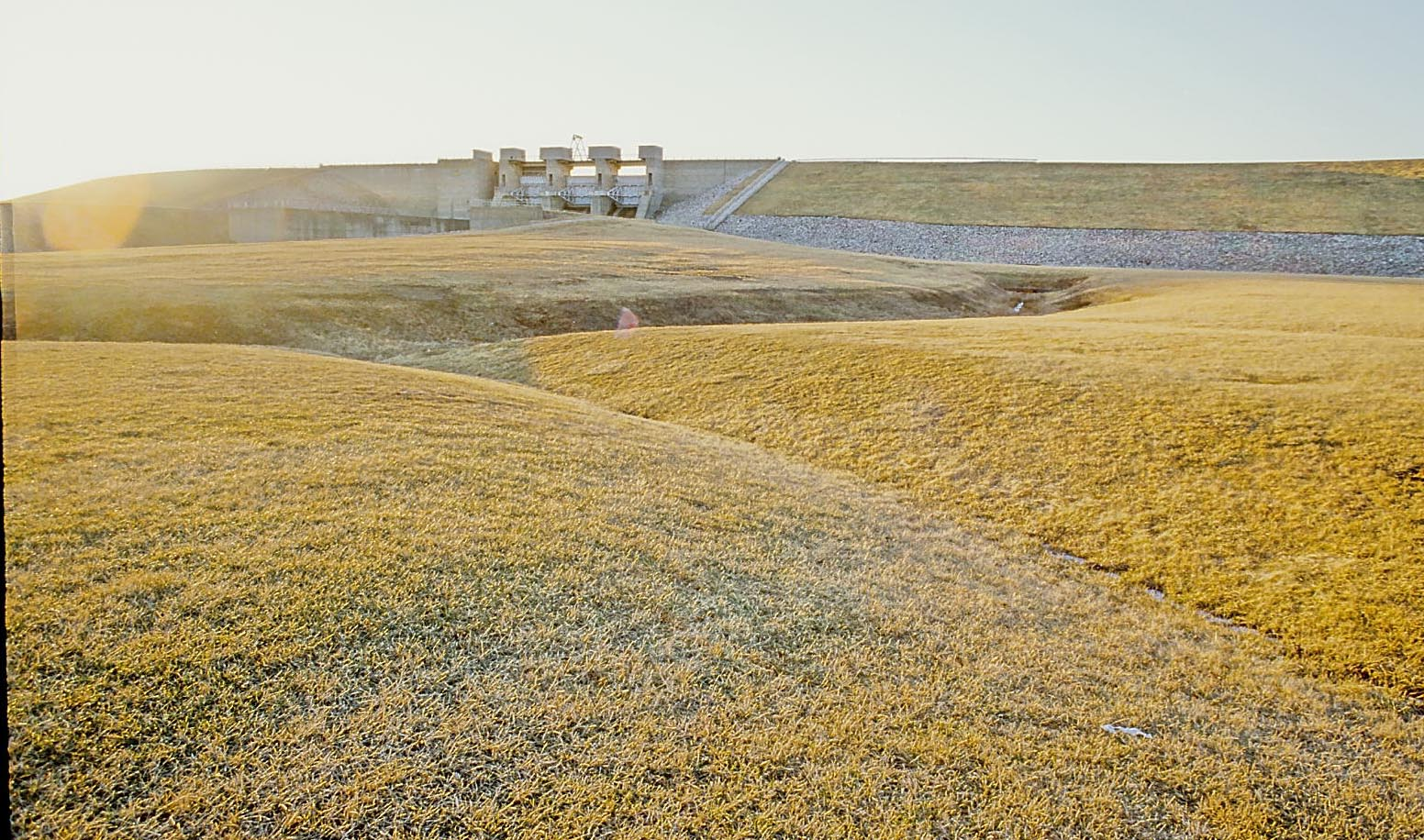
The Alum Creek Dam spillway is perched high on the abutment; this prompted concerns within the Army Corps of Engineers about deep-seated sliding.

== Potential dam failure and retrofit (1975–1978) ==
On April 24, 1975, during a periodic inspection of the completed dam, the US Army Corps of Engineers expressed concern about the safety of the spillway monoliths. The rock underlying the dam is Ohio Black Shale which is a largely hard, massive silt shale. It is highly fractured below the base of weathering. Within this shale are several light gray, silty to clayey shale seams up to 1 ft (0.30 m) thick. It may be possible that the spillway monolith and its underlying bedrock could slide forward on one of these seams, opening a gap between the monolith and the rolled earth dam leading to rapid and catastrophic erosion of the dam.

=== Testing ===
Twelve, 6 inches (150 mm) diameter core holes were drilled in the raceway directly in front of the ogee weirs. At least six of these cores exhibited a clayey seam about elevation 830 (nine feet below the ogee foundations). Testing of this material and deep-seated sliding analysis indicated that the dam did indeed face a safety issue.

=== Retrofitting ===
To prevent the concrete monolith from sliding forward, it was decided to install seven cable anchors deep into the bedrock. Each anchor consisted of bundled, high strength steel cables that were concreted into the bottom of the holes. They were then hydraulically tensioned and the holes filled with grout. Anchors were installed at a 45-degree angle to a depth of 813, or 26 feet (7.9 m) below the foundation of the ogees. On March 2, 1977, the project was bid to VSL Corporation for $254,777. Drilling for the anchors began on June 7, 1977. The final loading on each anchor was 1300 kips. On September 28, 1977, one of the anchor's foundations failed and had to be re-concreted. By 1978, the project was completed.

== January 2005 flood ==
On January 16, 2005, Alum Creek Dam's reservoir reached its highest level since construction was completed in 1974, an elevation of 898.94, about 17 feet (5.2 m) above normal level. At this level control was maintained through the discharge pipe and it was not necessary to open the three main spillway gates.

This extreme event was caused by an average of 5–8 inches (130–200 mm) of rain falling over Central Indiana and Ohio during January 4–14, 2005. This rain combined with snow melt and saturated ground to produce record breaking runoff. Other reservoirs also set pool level records, including Deer Creek, Delaware Lake, Paint Creek, Atwood Lake, Bolivar Dam, Charles Mill Lake, Dillon Lake, Dover Dam, Mohawk Dam, and Wills Creek.

== Recreation ==
Alum Creek Lake is popular with locals and regional tourists alike with its fishing, picnicking, boating, disc golf course, kitesurfing and hiking opportunities.
