= Africa U.S.A. =

Africa U.S.A. may refer to:

== Amusement parks ==
- Africa U.S.A. Park, an amusement park in Boca Raton, Florida, 1953–1961
- Marine World/Africa USA, an animal theme park in Redwood Shores, California, now Six Flags Discovery Kingdom

== Places ==
- Africa, Indiana, U.S.
- Africa, Ohio, U.S.
