= Polly Jackson =

American abolitionist

Polly Jackson, also referred to as Aunt Polly Jackson, was an American abolitionist and Underground Railroad guide. A former enslaved woman, she would dress up as an older woman and fight off slave traffickers from the Reverse Underground Railroad using a butcher knife and a kettle of boiling water.

== Biography ==
Not much information is known about Polly Jackson's early life. She was reportedly born into slavery in Virginia and moved to Ohio in the mid-1840s. She had a sister, Lindsey. After being freed, she began to reside in Africa, Ohio, an African American settlement near Ripley, Ohio. She was offered land in Africa and began operating a small farm to sustain herself there. At the time of the beginning of her abolitionist actions, she was described as being "middle-aged".

Jackson would aid fugitive enslaved people from the Underground Railroad by fighting off slave traffickers. She helped those who had crossed the Ohio River from Kentucky. She would disguise herself as a weak older woman and proceed to fight the traffickers with a butcher knife and a kettle of hot water. Many of her attacks were at night. After dealing with the traffickers, Jackson hosted the fugitives in her house and helped them with directions if they chose to continue their journey.
