= Africa (surname) =

Africa is a surname. Notable people with the surname include:

- Candido Africa (1895–1945), Filipino medical researcher
- Coco weAfrica (born 1991), Zimbabwean musician
- Dale Africa (born 1981), US Virgin Islands cricketer
- John Africa (1931–1985), American activist
- J. Simpson Africa (1832–1900), American politician
- Keagan Africa (born 1985), South African cricketer
- Melrick Africa (born 1978), Namibian rugby union player
- Susan Africa (born 1959), Filipino actress
- Zayn Africa (born 1994), Nigerian musician
