= Perpetuum Jazzile =

Slovenian choir

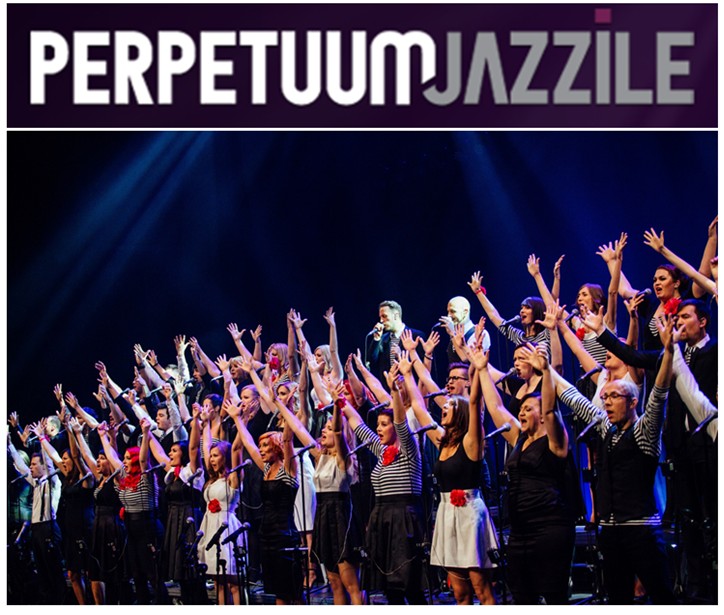

Background information
- Origin: Slovenia
- Genres: A cappella, pop, jazz, bossa nova, funk, soul
- Instruments: Singing, beatboxing, scat singing
- Members: (2025) Tim Čuček, Nina Mrak Seražin, Jana Hladnik Tratnik, Nataša Jovanovič, Laura Ivančič, Boštjan Usenik, Katarina Dolenc, Monika Avsenik Langus, Eva Deban, Vanja Brezavšček, Bojana Bergant Recelj, Neža Bukovec, Jože Petek, Klara Ingrid Gantar, Neža Turk, Žiga Jan Krese, Tadej Premužič, Karin Ahčin, Jana Gamser, Luka Grižonič, Tomaž Cör, Ana Marčun, Arian Krašna, Jan Trost, Blaž Andrejka, Florijan Volčanšek, Dominik Štrucelj, Klemen Brezavšček, Blaž Režonja, Blaž Papež, Nastja Vodenik, Karla Oršoš, Primož Kotar, Mojca Rusjan Kočevar, Maruša Dodič, Urša Marolt, Maja Ciglar, Ana Rojko, Anja Koren Usenik, Tara Sinkovič, Tina Renar, Gal Kebrič, Kristjan Virtič, Anamarija Čotar, Katja Kovačič

Perpetuum Jazzile is a Slovenian musical group best known for an a cappella version of the rock band Toto's song Africa. The May 2009 video showing a live performance of this version had received close to 22 million views on YouTube in 2013 and several million since.

The group was founded in 1983 (43 years ago) as Gaudeamus Chamber Choir and has always featured male and female singers. In 2025, there were 45 performers of whom 26 are female and 19 male. The group occasionally performs with the Slovenian Radio and Television Big Band, though most performances are a cappella.

== Leadership ==
The group was founded by Marko Tiran who led the Gaudeamus Choir for over 17 years. In 2001, the choir's art leadership was passed to Tomaž Kozlevčar. During his 10-year tenure, the group started performing under the new name and achieved international acclaim. Peder Karlsson was the group's art leader from 2011 to 2014. Currently, the group has a vocal coaching team, and the manager is Gvido Polanc.

== History ==
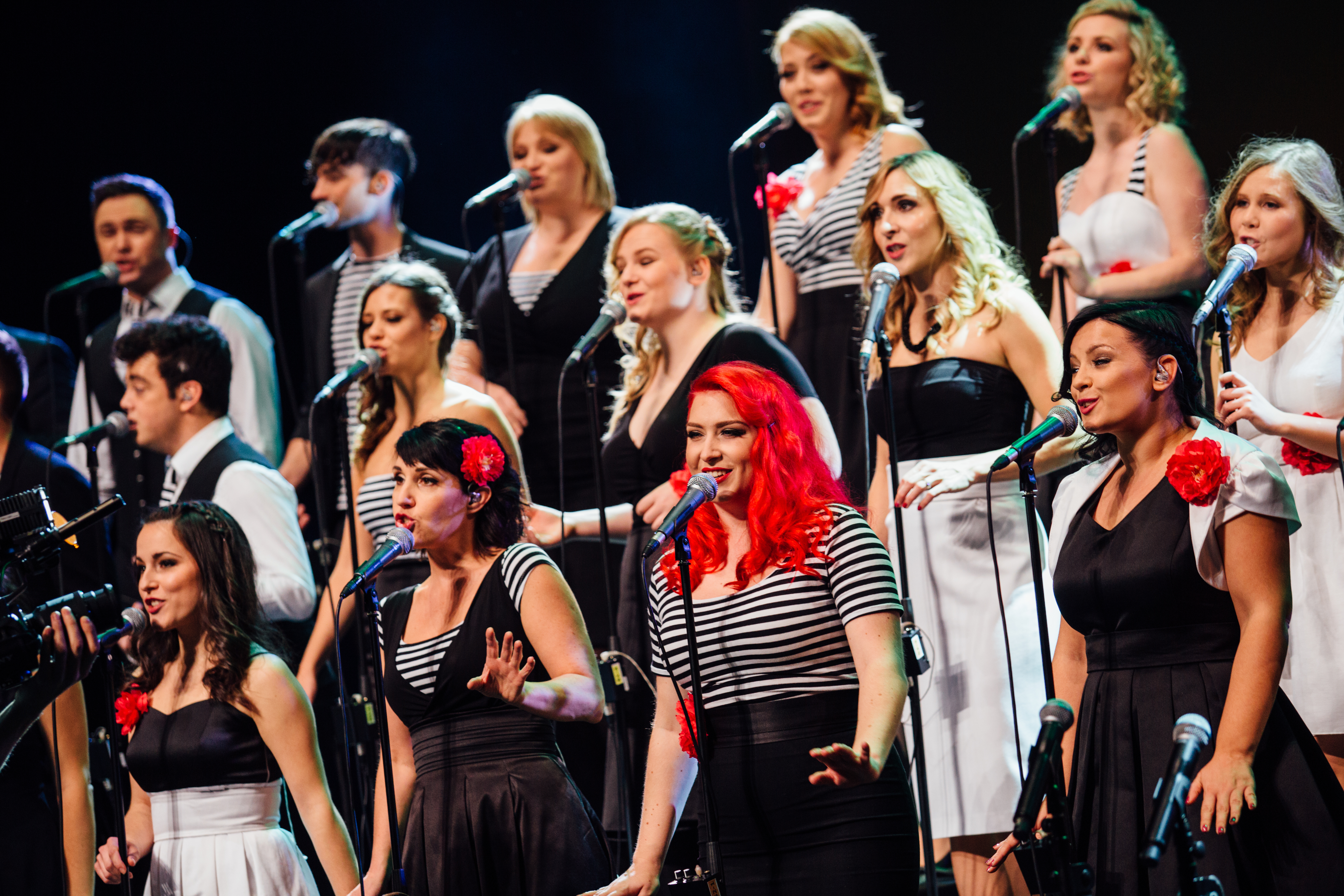
The sopranos' section during a concert at the 2015 Vokal Xtravaganzza

In 2006, the group recorded the album Čudna noč (Strange Night) which was released by Dallas Records. Group's performance of song Africa earned them high praise from song's original co-writer, David Paich and Toto invited the group for a joint performance at a 2011 concert held near Udine, Italy. In 2011, the choir embarked on a world tour which took them to Croatia, the Czech Republic, Germany, Canada, and USA, where they performed to sold-out venues.

Every year in autumn, the group performs Vokal Xtravaganzza evening concerts at the Cankar Hall in Ljubljana, with guests from Slovenia and abroad. In the past, they have performed with local artists Alenka Godec, Alya, Oto Pestner, Jan Plestenjak, and Nuša Derenda, as well as with international groups Vocalica (Italy), The Real Group (Sweden), ManSound (Ukraine), BR6 (Brazil), and The Real Six Pack (Germany).

In May 2015, Slovenian duo Maraaya who represented Slovenia at the Eurovision Song Contest 2015 with the song Here for You released a video of this song featuring Perpetuum Jazzile. In June 2015, the group performed at the Expo 2015 in Milan, Italy, and at the Guangzhou Opera House in November that year.

== Awards ==
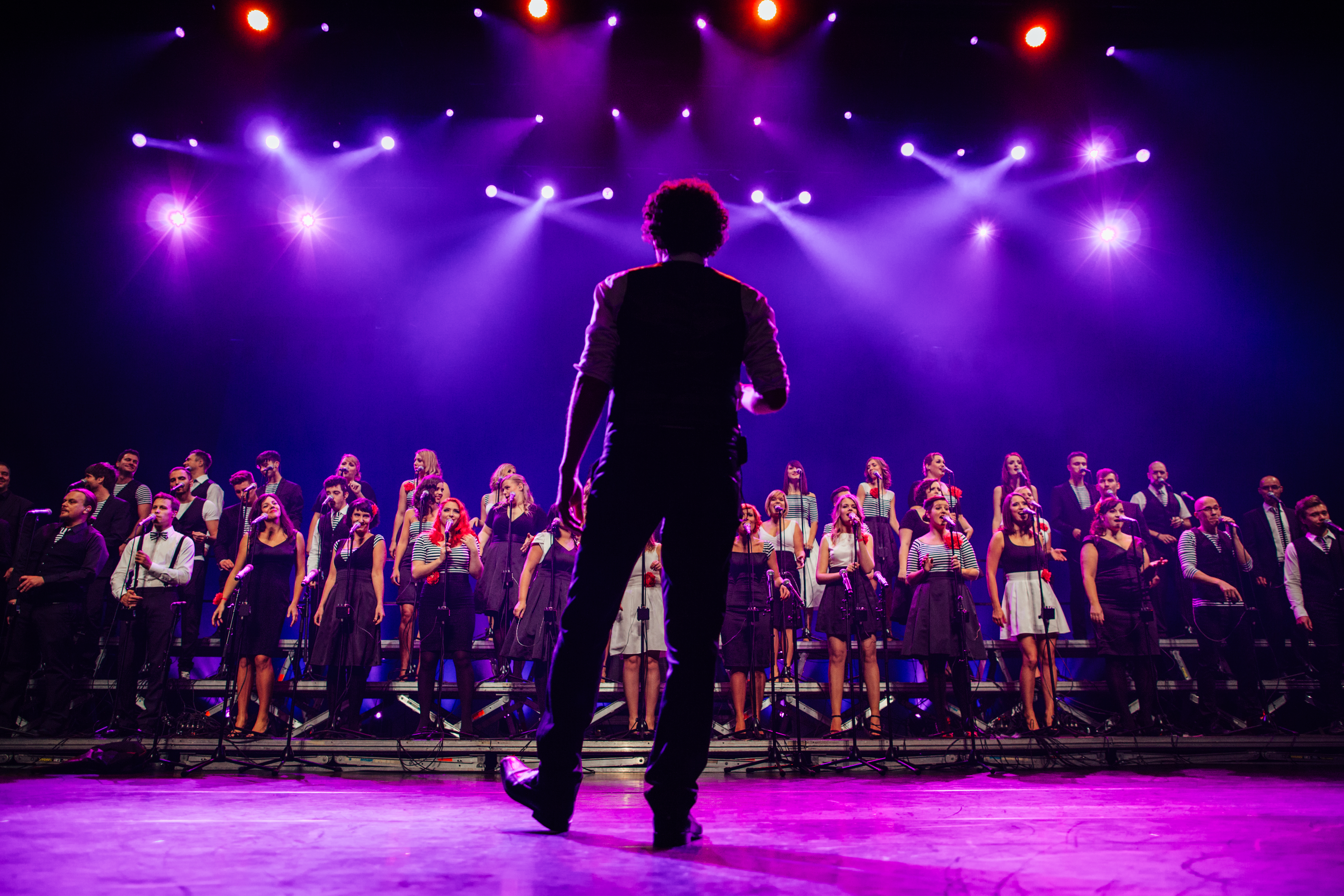
Andraž Slakan conducting Perpetuum Jazzile in October 2015

In 2008, the group was awarded the Vokal Total Award at the International Choir Festival and International A Cappella Competition and it also won awards at the international jazz vocal music competition in Tilburg, Netherlands, and the World Choir Games in Graz, Austria. In 2010, the group was awarded the "Viktor Award", a top level music award in Slovenia.

== Discography ==
- Ko boš prišla na Bled (When You Come to Bled) (2000) COBISS 12747068
- Pozabi, da se ti mudi (Forget You're In a Hurry) (2003) COBISS 13669180
- As (2004)
- Čudna noč (Strange night) (2006) COBISS 14396732
- Africa (2009)
- Perpetuum Jazzile Live [Vokal Xtravaganzza 2008 - DVD] (2009)
- Vocal Ecstasy (German Tour Edition - CD) (2012)
- Vocal Ecstasy (German Tour Edition Superbox - CD+DVD) (2012)
- Thank You For The Music (30th Anniversary Jubilee Edition - CD') (2013)
- The Show, Live in Arena (CD & DVD) (2013)
- Both Sides (Double Album - CD) (2016)
- Both Sides (Vinyl) (2017)
- So najlepše pesmi že napisane? (CD compilation in Slovenian language.) (2018)
- Smells Like... (CD) (2023)

== Bibliography ==
- Eddy Kester, “Perpetuum Jazzile hits all the right notes to become Slovenia's best-known brand”, bne IntelliNews, 30 July 2015.
