= Begoña Blasco =

Spanish rhythmic gymnast (born 1960)

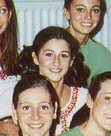

Personal information
- Full name: Begoña Blasco Laffón
- Born: April 30, 1960 (age 66) Teruel, Spain

Gymnastics career
- Discipline: Rhythmic gymnastics
- Country represented: Spain (1974-1977)
- Retired: yes
Medal record
Rhythmic Gymnastics
Representing Spain
World Championships
Bronze medal – third place	1975 Madrid	Ribbon

Begoña Blasco (born 30 April 1960) is a former Spanish rhythmic gymnast. She won the bronze medal with ribbon at the World Championships in Madrid in 1975. That same year she became the first national champion of Spain.

== Career ==
Blasco was part of the first national rhythmic gymnastics team in Spain, created by the Royal Spanish Gymnastics Federation in 1974. The team's selector was the Bulgarian Ivanka Tchakarova, who had the help of Carmen Algora as a coach. At first they trained in the gym of the Consejo Superior de Deportes, where there was no carpet, and later they moved to the Moscardó Gym in Madrid. They also held several concentrations before the competitions, such as the ones they had in Pontevedra or in Sofia and Varna. In 1974 he participated in the Spain-Italy meeting in Madrid, her first international competition.

At the end of April 1975, she participate in the 1st Spanish Rhythmic Gymnastics Championship, held in Madrid. In it she became the first absolute champion of Spain, beating María Jesús Alegre and África Blesa. In the apparatus finals she won gold with clubs, bronze with ribbon, hoop and with rope. In May 1975 she participated with Alegre and Blesa in the Corbeil-Essonnes tournament and the Stoudenska Tribouna Cup in Sofia.

On November 24, 1975, at the World Championships in Madrid, she won the bronze medal in the ribbon final and was 11th in the All-Around. The other Spanish representatives in the Championship were María Jesús Alegre, Africa Blesa and the Spanish group. Although the start of the competition was initially scheduled for November 20, it had to be delayed due to the death of Francisco Franco. In an unofficial European Cup held in Vienna in April 1976 the Spanish individuals were 10th. In May, she returned to the Stoudenska Tribouna Cup in Sofia with the rest of the individuals. in the All-Around she finished behind María Jesús Alegre. That year she participated with her teammates in an exhibition at the opening of the 1976 Montreal Olympics.

In May 1977 she returned to the Stoudenska Tribouna Cup in Sofia, where she was 25th in the All-Around. In October 1977 he participated in the World Championship in Basel, where she finished 22nd in the All-Around. On 10 In December 1977 she was again the runner-up in Spain behind María Jesús Alegre in the Spanish Individual Rhythmic Gymnastics Championship in Gijón.

=== Retirement ===
Begoña is currently a Doctor in Physical Sciences from the Complutense University of Madrid and, since 1984, a professor at the Higher Technical School of Building, belonging to the Polytechnic University. She has published books such as Fundamentos físicos de la edificación I (2006), Fundamentos físicos de la edificación I: ejercicios resueltos (2006) and Fundamentos físicos de la edificación II (2008). She has completed her training by studying the processes of teaching-learning of the most capable students who present school failure, developing the University Expert course in Diagnosis and Education of Highly Capable Students at the UNED. On this subject, Blasco coordinates an Educational Innovation group at the Polytechnic University (ALCIN Group: Training and support for young people with high intellectual capacity).

On November 14, 2021, her first novel, Victoria, was published.
