= Mitsuru Hiraguchi =

- 平口美鶴
- Born: 5 May 1960 (age 66) Shizuoka Prefecture

Gymnastics career
- Discipline: Rhythmic gymnastics
- Country represented: Japan (1975)
- Retired: yes
Medal record
Rhythmic Gymnastics
Representing Japan
World Championships
Gold medal – first place	1975 Madrid	Hoop
Silver medal – second place	1975 Madrid	Group

Mitsuru Hiraguchi (Japanese: 平口美鶴; born 5 May 1960) is a retired Japanese rhythmic gymnast.

== Career ==
At the 1975 World Championships Hiraguchi took 4th place with ball, 9th place in the All-Around and won gold with hoop tied with Carmen Rischer as well as silver with the group. This was the first time a Japanese won a medal in that competition and it would take 42 years before Kaho Minagawa won another in 2017.

== Achievements ==
- First Japanese rhythmic gymnast to win a medal in an individual apparatus final at World Championships.
- First Japanese rhythmic gymnast to win a gold medal in an individual apparatus final at World Championships.
