= Oto Pestner =

Slovenian politician and singer

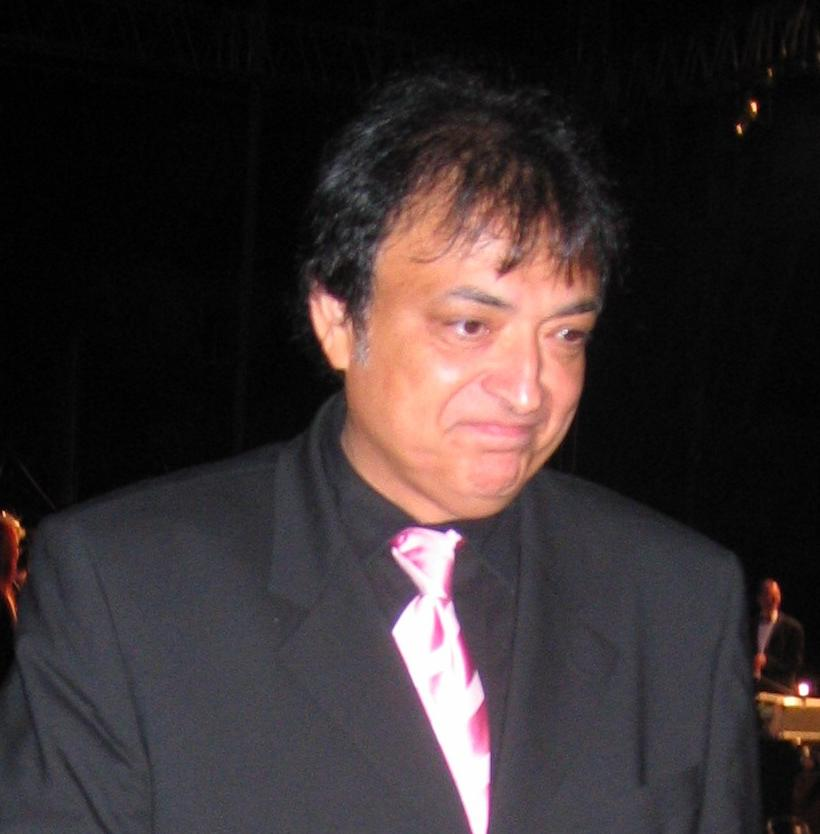
- Born: January 4, 1956 (age 70); Celje, SR Slovenia, SFR Yugoslavia
- Citizenship: Slovenia
- Occupation: vocalist
- Years active: 1968–present

Oto Pestner (born January 4, 1956, in Celje) is a politician and one of the most prominent singers and composers of popular music from Slovenia. He is the leader of the Slovene vocal group New Swing Quartet.

From 1986 to 1991 and in 1995, he was a member of Alpski kvintet (German: Alpenoberkrainer).

Pestner has performed with artists including Golden Gate Quartet, Bobby McFerrin, Mercer Ellington, Dexter Gordon, New York Voices, Sheila Raye Charles, The Brown Sisters, Ladies of Song, B.B. King, Acappella, Ridgewood Baptist Choir, Perpetuum Jazzile, Divas, Oliver Dragojević, The Eugster Brothers and others. Some of his hits include "Vse je lepše, ker te ljubim" (1971), "Trideset let" (1972), "Dan ljubezni" (1975), "Bisere imaš v očeh" (1978), "Tople julijske noči" (1979), "Moja dežela" (1986), "Ciganska kri" (1991), "Dan za zaljubljene" (1993).

He was a candidate for the Slovenian National Assembly, with the party Povežimo Slovenijo.
