= María Jesús Alegre =

Spanish rhythmic gymnast

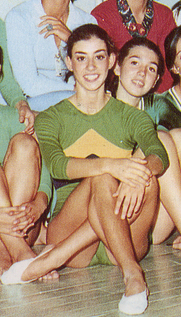

Personal information
- Full name: María Jesús Alegre Etayo
- Born: 17 December 1957 (age 68) Madrid, Spain
- Spouse: Florencio Oliván

Gymnastics career
- Discipline: Rhythmic gymnastics
- Country represented: Spain (1974–1978)
- Club: Club Cuartel de la Montaña
- Head coach: Ivanka Tchakarova
- Retired: yes
Medal record
Rhythmic Gymnastics
Representing Spain
World Championships
Silver medal – second place	1975 Madrid	Clubs
Bronze medal – third place	1975 Madrid	All-Around
Bronze medal – third place	1975 Madrid	Hoop
Bronze medal – third place	1975 Madrid	Ball

María Jesús Alegre Etayo (17 December 1957), also known as Chus Alegre, is a Spanish former rhythmic gymnast. She achieved, among other medals, the bronze in the general of the World Championship in Madrid in 1975, the first medal in an international competition for the Spanish national team and the only one in the individual All-Around of a World Championship to date. She won another three more medals in that World Cup and was also absolute champion of Spain in 1976 and 1977.

== Career ==
After practicing ballet, she began rhythmic gymnastics at the Club Cuartel de la Montaña in Madrid. This and the Club Moscardó were the only two Madrid gymnastics clubs that existed at the time. Later, Alegre was part of the first national rhythmic gymnastics team in Spain, created by the Royal Spanish Gymnastics Federation in 1974. The team's selector was the Bulgarian Ivanka Tchakarova, who had the help of Carmen Algora as a coach. At first they trained in the gym of the National Sports Delegation, where there was no carpet, and later they went to the Moscardó Gymnasium in Madrid. They also held several concentrations before the competitions, such as the ones they had in Pontevedra or in Sofia and Varna. In 1974 he participated in the Spain-Italy meeting in Madrid, her first international competition.

At the end of April 1975, she participated in the 1st Spanish Rhythmic Gymnastics Championship, held in Madrid. In the same she won the silver medal, behind Begoña Blasco and tied with África Blesa. In the apparatus finals she won gold with hoop, ribbon and rope and bronze with clubs. In May 1975 she participated with Blasco and Blesa in the Corbeil-Essonnes tournament and the Stoudenska Tribouna Cup in Sofia.

On 24 November 1975, at the World Championship in Madrid, she won the bronze medal in the All-Around, being the first official international medal in the history of the Spanish team and the only one in the individual All-Around to date. Later she also got bronze with both hoop and ball, and silver with clubs. The other Spanish representatives in the World Cup were Begoña Blasco, Africa Blesa and the Spanish group. Although the start of the competition was initially scheduled for 20 November, it had to be delayed due to the death of Francisco Franco. Alegre was then 17 years old. After this milestone, in 1976 she received numerous awards, such as the Sunbeam Trophy for the 2nd best Spanish athlete by Mundo Deportivo, or the Joaquín Blume Trophy for the best Spanish athlete under 22 years in the National Sports Awards, which she received from King Juan Carlos I. In an unofficial European Championships held in Vienna in April 1976 attended by the individual team, she was 9th. In May she went back with the rest of the individuals to the Stoudenska Tribouna Cup in Sofia, where she finished 18th. During the tournament she suffered an injury. That year she participated with her teammates in an exhibition at the opening of the Olympic Games in Montréal 1976.

Alegre was also national champion in 1976 and 1977 in two championships held in Madrid and Gijón respectively, also making a gold clean sweep in the latter. In May 1977 she returned to the Stoudenska Tribouna Cup in Sofia, where she was 7th in All-Around, won bronze with ribbon and finished 5th in ball, 6th in hoop and 7th in rope. In October 1977 she participated in the World Championship in Basel, where she obtained 19th place in the All-Around. In addition, in this same championship she participated as a member of the Spanish team, being 7th with the same with ball, 6th with clubs, and 8th with rope.

Although she intended to participate in the European Championships in Madrid in November, she became pregnant during the month of vacation and decided to withdraw. After her retirement she married that same year 1978 with the athlete Florencio Oliván, later also a coach. Alegre had combined her career as a gymnast with studies in Biology. For a time she worked for the national team, but in 1989 she was appointed instructor of rhythmic gymnastics in the City Council of Aranjuez, and later became director of the Municipal School of Rhythmic Gymnastics of that city, which she continues to direct today. She is the mother of three children, all of them athletes.
