= 1975 World Rhythmic Gymnastics Championships =

- Location: Madrid, Spain
- Start date: 23 November 1975
- End date: 24 November 1975

The VII World Rhythmic Gymnastics Championships were held on 23–24 November 1975 in Madrid, Spain. The competition was originally scheduled to be held 20–23 November. However, after the death of Francisco Franco on 20 November, no events could be held until after his funeral, which was scheduled for 23 November. The competition instead began immediately after his funeral and was extended to the evening of the 24th.

14 countries participated; 11 (all but Israel, New Zealand, and the United States) sent groups, and 37 individuals competed. Great Britain and Switzerland sent gymnasts for the first time. Groups competed with three balls and three ropes. The groups and gymnasts with the top six scores in the qualifying round advanced to the finals.

No Communist countries attended the championships, meaning no gymnasts from any countries that medaled at the 1973 Championships (Soviet Union, Bulgaria, Czechoslovakia, East Germany, Hungary) were in attendance, and North Korea also did not attend. Finnish gymnasts were originally entered into the competition, but they were told two days beforehand that they could not attend. Denmark declined to send gymnasts for financial reasons.

During the competition, one judge was appointed specifically to watch for acrobatic elements, which were prohibited; many judges had difficulty understanding which elements counted as acrobatic, and some gymnasts had to change their routines before the competition to remove the prohibited elements.

West Germany dominated the competition, winning 9 medals. West German Carmen Rischer won three individual medals, including the all-around, making her Germany's first World champion. Fellow German Christiana Rosenberg won gold in the other two finals. In the hoop final, Midori Koriki was penalized one point because her hoop was weighed and shown to be too light. The crowd booed the result loudly, and other gymnasts brought her to the stage to be cheered for. During that final, another Japanese gymnast, Mitsuru Hiraguchi, won Japan's first World Championships medal, gold, tied with Rischer.

== Medal table ==
Place	Country	Gold	Silver	Bronze	Total
1	West Germany	5	4	0	9
2	Japan	1	1	0	2
3	Italy	1	0	0	1
4	Spain	0	1	5	6

== Individual ==
=== Clubs ===
Place	Nation	Name	AA Score	AF Score	Total
1	(West Germany)	Christiana Rosenberg	9.250	9.350	18.600
2=	(West Germany)	Carmen Rischer	9.150	9.350	18.500
2=	(Spain)	María Jesús Alegre	9.250	9.250	18.500
4	(Italy)	Cristina Cammelli	9.150	9.200	18.350
5=	(West Germany)	Ute Barylla	9.050	8.900	17.950
5=	(Japan)	Yoko Morino	8.950	9.000	17.950

=== Ball ===
Place	Nation	Name	AA Score	AF Score	Total
1	(West Germany)	Christiana Rosenberg	9.350	9.250	18.600
2	(West Germany)	Carmen Rischer	9.100	9.200	18.300
3	(Spain)	María Jesús Alegre	9.050	9.200	18.250
4	(Japan)	Mitsuru Hiraguchi	9.000	9.150	18.150
5	(Japan)	Yoko Morino	8.900	9.200	18.100
6	(Italy)	Cristina Cammelli	8.950	8.950	17.900

=== Ribbon ===
Place	Nation	Name	AA Score	AF Score	Total
1	(West Germany)	Carmen Rischer	9.450	9.500	18.950
2	(West Germany)	Christiana Rosenberg	9.450	9.450	18.900
3	(Spain)	Begoña Blasco	9.200	9.250	18.450
4=	(West Germany)	Ute Barylla	9.150	9.200	18.350
4=	(Spain)	Africa Blesa	9.250	9.100	18.350
6	(Italy)	Marina Odorici	9.050	8.800	17.850

=== Hoop ===
Place	Nation	Name	AA Score	AF Score	Total
1=	(Japan)	Mitsuru Hiraguchi	9.150	9.250	18.400
1=	(West Germany)	Carmen Rischer	9.400	9.000	18.400
3	(Spain)	María Jesús Alegre	9.150	9.100	18.250
4	(Japan)	Yoko Morino	9.150	9.000	18.150
5	(West Germany)	Ute Barylla	9.000	9.100	18.100
6	(Japan)	Midori Koriki	9.350	8.350	17.700

=== Individual All-Around ===
Place	Nation	Name	Clubs	Ball	Ribbon	Hoop	Total
1	(West Germany)	Carmen Rischer	9.150	9.100	9.450	9.400	37.100
2	(West Germany)	Christiana Rosenberg	9.250	9.350	9.450	8.650	36.700
3	(Spain)	María Jesús Alegre	9.250	9.050	8.900	9.150	36.350
4	(West Germany)	Ute Barylla	9.050	8.850	9.150	9.000	36.050
5	(Japan)	Yoko Morino	8.950	8.900	9.000	9.150	36.000
6=	(Italy)	Cristina Cammelli	9.150	8.950	8.950	8.850	35.900
6=	(Italy)	Marina Odorici	8.950	8.900	9.050	9.000	35.900
8	(Japan)	Midori Koriki	8.850	8.90	8.650	9.350	35.750
9=	(Spain)	Africa Blesa	8.700	8.900	9.250	8.850	35.700
9=	(Japan)	Mitsuru Hiraguchi	8.600	9.000	8.950	9.150	35.700
11	(Spain)	Begoña Blasco	8.600	8.750	9.200	8.800	35.350
12	(Italy)	Silvia d'Alberti	8.550	8.500	8.450	8.750	34.250
13	(Canada)	Shirley Lethinen	8.250	8.400	8.550	8.700	33.900
14=	(Canada)	Doreen Chung	8.450	8.250	8.550	8.600	33.850
14=	(Canada)	Denise Fujiwara	8.900	8.600	7.850	8.500	33.850
16	(Brazil)	Ines Oliveira	8.350	7.950	8.650	8.350	33.300
17	(France)	Josette Bellanger	8.450	7.850	8.500	8.350	33.150
18	(France)	Patricia Vanauld	7.300	8.400	8.550	8.500	32.750
19=	(Belgium)	Cristine Delaporte	8.250	7.850	8.350	8.100	32.500
19=	(Belgium)	Rita de Leenheer	8.650	7.650	8.250	7.950	32.500
21	(United States)	Helen Martinez	8.200	7.800	8.250	8.200	32.450
22	(Austria)	Petra Ovcaric	8.050	7.600	8.250	7.900	31.800
23	(United States)	Candice Feinberg	7.650	8.000	8.000	8.050	31.700
24	(France)	Catherine Bucheton	7.900	8.400	8.450	6.750	31.500
25	(Belgium)	Brita de Kimpe	8.100	7.200	7.850	8.150	31.300
26	(Israel)	Batia Masnikov	8.450	7.100	7.550	8.000	31.100
27	(New Zealand)	Janette Ralph	8.150	7.200	7.900	7.650	30.900
28=	(Israel)	Ilanith Frankfurt	7.650	7.350	7.950	7.900	30.850
28=	(Austria)	Doris Kandler	8.300	7.250	7.550	7.750	30.850
30	(United States)	Kathryn Brym	8.050	7.200	7.400	8.150	30.800
31=	(Austria)	Edith Haas	7.900	7.450	7.700	7.600	30.650
31=	(New Zealand)	Janice Heale	7.900	7.200	7.750	7.800	30.650
33	(Israel)	Recouvith Bloch	7.050	7.250	7.850	8.050	30.200
34	(New Zealand)	Kaye Wilson	7.750	7.450	6.700	7.550	29.450
35	(United Kingdom)	Elisabeth Mann	7.250	6.400	7.250	7.750	28.650
36	(United Kingdom)	Barbara Mould	7.700	5.800	7.400	7.600	28.500
37	(United Kingdom)	Eileen Ward	6.750	5.700	6.500	6.300	25.250

== Groups ==
=== Groups Final ===
Place	Nation	Preliminary Score	Final Score	Total
1	Italy	18.300	18.650	36.950
2	Japan	17.950	18.650	36.600
3	Spain	17.850	18.200	36.050
4	Canada	16.650	17.050	33.700
5	West Germany	16.600	16.800	33.400
6	France	16.650	16.050	32.700

=== Groups Preliminary ===
Place	Nation	Score
1	Italy	18.300
2	Japan	17.950
3	Spain	17.850
4=	Canada	16.650
4=	France	16.650
6	West Germany	16.600
7	Brazil	16.100
8	Austria	15.900
9	Belgium	15.850
10	Switzerland	15.650
11	Great Britain	15.200
