= Čudna noč =

Studio album by Perpetuum Jazzile
- Released: 2006
- Genre: Pop, jazz, funk, bossa nova
- Length: 73 min
- Label: Dallas
- Producer: Tomaž Kozlevčar

Perpetuum Jazzile chronology
As… (2004)	Čudna noč (2006)	Africa (2009)

Čudna noč is an album by Slovenian a cappella band Perpetuum Jazzile released in 2006 by Dallas Records.

The album was produced and arranged by Slovenian producer and singer Tomaž Kozlevčar. The whole album consists of cover songs.

== Track listing ==
Source: Official site

No.	Title	Length
1.	"Čudna noč / Strange night"	4:05
2.	"Girl from Ipanema / Garrota de Ipanema" (A. C. Jobim/A.C Jobim/T. Kozlevčar)
3.	"Blame it on the Sun" (S. Wonder/S. Wright/T. Kozlevčar)
4.	"Ne zameri mi / Don' blame me"
5.	"Samo nasmeh / Solo un sorriso"	5:34
6.	"A day in a life of a fool (Manha de carnaval)" (L. Bonfá/A. Maria/T. Kozlevčar)
7.	"As" (S. Wonder/S. Wonder/T. Kozlevčar)	3:24
8.	"Brez besed / Eres tu" (J. C. Calderón / J. C. Calderón /T. Kozlevčar)	4:10
9.	"Lullaby of the leaves"
10.	"Just one of those things"
11.	"Intima"
12.	"Baroque samba" (D. Meader/D. Meader/T. Kozlevčar)	6:03
13.	"The Manhattan transfer in concert" (Birdland / Spice of life Tuxedo junction)
14.	"Killing Me Softly" (C. Fox/N. Gimbel/T. Kozlevčar)	5:30
15.	"Joyful, Joyful" (feat. 6pack Čukur)	4:48
16.	"Čudna noč / Strange night" (Radio mix)
