= Afrika =

Afrika may refer to the continent of Africa or to:

== Arts and entertainment ==
- Afrika (video game), for PlayStation 3
- "Afrika" (song), by Električni Orgazam
- A.F.R.I.K.A., a 2002 South Korean film
- Afrika (film), a 1973 Italian film

== People ==
- Afrika (artist) (born 1966), Russian artist
- Afrika Bambaataa (Lance Taylor, 1957–2026), American DJ, rapper, and producer
- Cecil Afrika (born 1988), South African rugby player
- Tatamkhulu Afrika (1920–2002), South African poet and writer

== Other uses ==
- Afrika, a fashion line by M.I.A.
- Russian cruiser Afrika, a cruiser of the Imperial Russian Navy

== See also ==
- Africa (disambiguation)
- Afrika Korps, the German expeditionary force in Africa in World War II
- McAfrika, a former McDonald's hamburger
- New Afrika, an American separatist organization
