= Africa '70 =

Africa '70 may refer to:

- Africa '70 (band), a band associated with afrobeat musician Fela Kuti
- Africa '70 (NGO), an Italian organization
