= Africa '70 (NGO) =

Africa '70 is an Italian non-governmental organization (NGO) working on urban planning and problems in Africa, the Middle East and Central America. It was created in 1970 and the headquarters are in Monza, Italy.

== See also ==
Women consortium of Nigeria
