= Coco weAfrica =

Zimbabwean musician (born 1991)

Coco weAfrica Combination Chauya
- Also known as: Coco Master
- Born: August 22, 1991 (age 35); Harare, Zimbabwe
- Origin: Zimbabwean
- Genres: Afro pop; Afrobeats; world
- Occupations: Singer, songwriter
- Years active: 2016–present
- Label: New Africa Music

Coco weAfrica (born August 22, 1991), is a Zimbabwean musical artist popular on Afrobeats, known for his 2016 hit song "Mai VaDhikondo". At the time he was known as Coco Master, which he then changed to Coco weAfrica.

== Early life ==
Coco weAfrica was born in 1991 in Mashonaland West Province. He attended primary school at Lancaster Primary School, and high school at Chidamoyo High School in Chidamoyo Rural District, up to form two. He then went to Chikangwe Boarding High School in Karoi, Zimbabwe. He studied marketing with the London Centre of Marketing and also has a Certificate in National HIV Prevention Behavior Change Programme.

== Music career ==
Coco initially ventured into the music industry as a Hiphop artist in November 2016 and has worked with many distinct artists and producers such as Freeman, Andy Muridzo, Nutty O, Jah Signal Dj Tamuka, Chiweddah and Oskid. Coco is joined by Jah Prayzah, Ginimbi, Casper Nyovest and other high-profile celebrities as exclusive brand ambassadors to “Chasers” the elite clothing label.

== Discography ==
=== Albums ===
- Follow Me (EP)

=== Singles ===
- Mai VaDhikondo
- Hona - featuring Hubby Blakes
- Pampaka - featuring Nutty O
- Hustlers - featuring Freeman
- Gokamu
- Kamilia
- Guveya
- Cruise Control
- Shadabu
- Volume
- You
- Hustlers
- Replay
- Tell Me

== Awards and accolades ==
Year	Ceremony	Award	Result
2017	Changamire Festival	Best Collaboration	Won
2018	Zim Hip-Hop Awards	Best Alternative	Won
2018	Zim Glam Awards	Best Alternative	Nominated
2019	Changamire Festival	Best Male	Nominated
2019	Changamire Festival	People's Choice	Won
