= África Lorente Castillo =

Spanish teacher, politician, and activist (1954–2020)

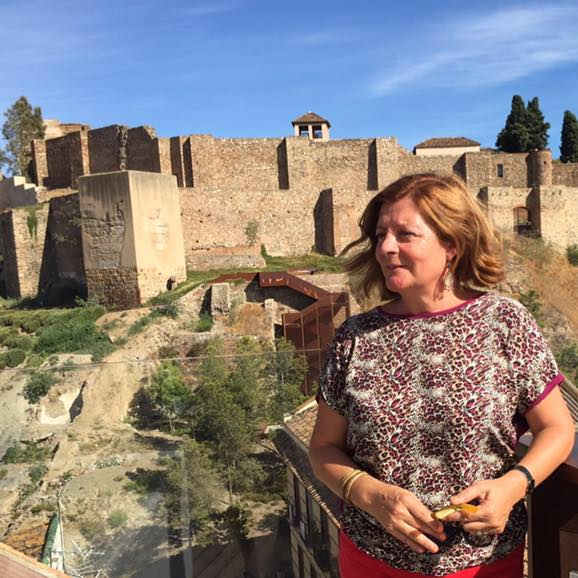
África Lorente in 2015

África Lorente Castillo (16 October 1954 – 1 May 2020) was a Spanish teacher, politician and activist. She was a member of the Spanish Socialist Workers' Party.

== Life ==
Lorente was born in the Spanish protectorate of Morocco. Her parents were from Ceutí. She was a member of the Catalan Parliament from 1984 to 1988. From 1987 to 2003, she was Deputy Mayor of Castelldefels.

Lorente Castillo died of COVID-19 on 1 May 2020 in Castelldefels, aged 65.
