= Zayn Africa =

Nigerian singer-songwriter

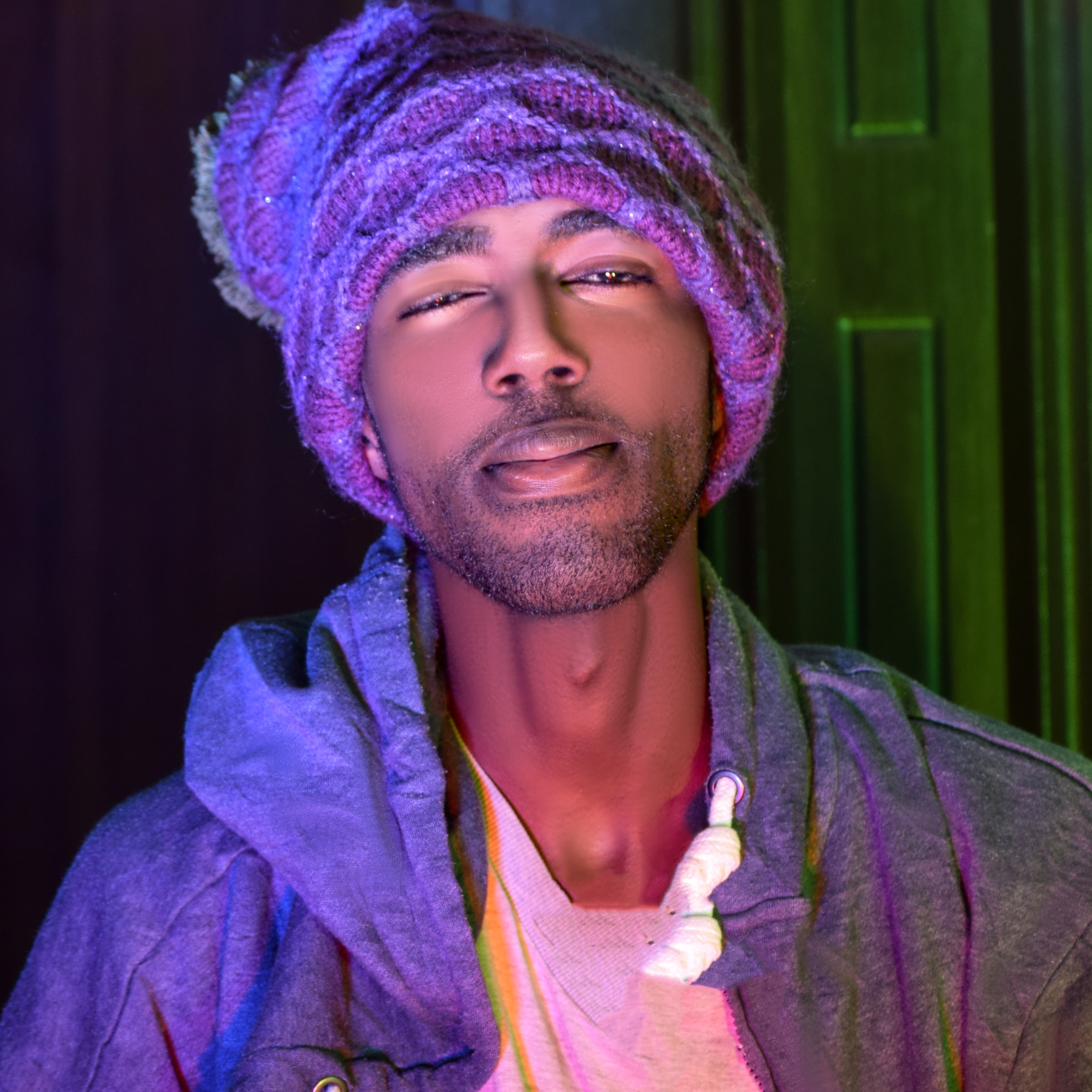
- Zayn Africa in 2010

Background information
- Born: Abdulmajid Aliyu; 1 June 1994 (age 31); Kaduna, Nigeria
- Genres: R&B; pop; Afrobeat; Hip Hop/Rap
- Occupations: Singer; Songwriter; Record producer
- Years active: 2012–present

Abdulmajid Aliyu (born 1 June 1994) known professionally as Zayn Africa, is a Nigerian singer, songwriter and record producer.

== Early life ==
Zayn Africa was born in Kaduna State, Nigeria where he obtained his JSCE and SSCE from Command Secondary School Kaduna State, then moved further and obtained his degree education in Computer Engineering & graduated with a distinction from Bayero University Kano, Nigeria.

In 2017, he released a musical studio album titled "The Relationship" with 11 tracks which earned him artistic recognition in Nigeria.

== Discography ==
- Music Album

Year	Albums	Album Tracks	Ref
2017	"The Relationship"	1. Saurara; 2. Don't Cry; 3. Don't Cry Remix (feat. Babsin); 4. Kece On My Mind; 5. Mamanmu; 6. Mamanmu Remix (feat. DJ AB & Feezy); 7. You Want It (feat. DJ AB & Feezy); 8. Kishiya (feat. Feezy); 9. Kije Gida; 10. Ki Dawo; 11. Banga Wata Ba	

In 2020, Zayn was featured in a Nigerian Hausa Hip-Hop musical song titled "Da so samu ne".
