= Africa (game) =

1977 wargame

Africa is a 1977 wargame published by UKW.

== Gameplay ==
Africa is a game in which the US, USSR, China, France and UK fight over the 14 states in southern Africa.

== Reception ==
Marcus Watney reviewed Africa in Perfidious Albion #25 (February 1978) and stated that "This game has some of the worst physical design I have encountered. It has some of the most ill-conceived rules I have read. It bears no relation to Africa. Like a recent attempted Ecuadorian coup, it was 'conceived before cocktails, and executed after.'"
