= África Blesa =

Spanish former rhythmic gymnast

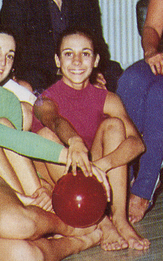

Personal information
- Full name: África Blesa Bort
- Born: 14 December 1958 (age 67) Malabo, Spanish Guinea

Gymnastics career
- Discipline: Rhythmic gymnastics
- Country represented: Spain; (1974-1977)
- Head coach: Ivanka Tchakarova
- Retired: yes

África Blesa (born 14 December 1958) is a Spanish former rhythmic gymnast. She was part of the first national rhythmic gymnastics team in Spain and participated in the World Championship in Madrid in 1975.

== Personal life ==
África was born in 1958 in Malabo, Spanish Guinea, where her father worked on a fruit and agricultural farm. In 1968 she moved to Barcelona with his family. At the Maragall Institute she began to practice educational gymnastics, participating in school championships. He later became interested in rhythmic gymnastics, which he began practicing in 1971. She then moved to Madrid and in 1973 participated as a student in the first course of rhythmic gymnastics coaches and judges, taught by the Italian Egle Abruzzini and the Hungarian Madame Abad.

== Career ==
Blesa was part of the first national rhythmic gymnastics team in Spain, created by the Royal Spanish Gymnastics Federation in 1974. The team's selector was the Bulgarian Ivanka Tchakarova, who had the help of Carmen Algora as a coach. At first they trained in the gym of the National Sports Delegation, where there was no carpet, and later they went to the Moscardó Gymnasium in Madrid. They also held several concentrations before the competitions, such as the ones they had in Pontevedra or in Sofia and Varna. In 1974 he participated in the Spain-Italy meeting in Madrid, her first international competition.

At the end of April 1975, she participated in the 1st Spanish Rhythmic Gymnastics Championship, held in Madrid. In the same she won the silver medal, behind Begoña Blasco and tied with María Jésus Alegre In the apparatus finals she won silver with hoop, gold with clubs and ribbon. In May 1975 she participated with Blasco and Alegre in the Corbeil-Essonnes tournament and the Stoudenska Tribouna Cup in Sofia.

On November 24, 1975, at the World Championship in Madrid, she was 9th in the All-Around and 4th with ribbon. The other Spanish representatives in the World Cup were Begoña Blasco, Africa Blesa and the Spanish group. Although the start of the competition was initially scheduled for November 20, it had to be delayed due to the death of Francisco Franco. In an unofficial European Championships held in Vienna in April 1976 attended by the individual team, she was 9th. In May she went back with the rest of the individuals to the Stoudenska Tribouna Cup in Sofia, where she finished 16th. In the II Spanish Championship, again in Madrid that year, she won the bronze medal in the All-Around, gold with hoop, silver with rope and ribbon, and bronze with ball. That year she participated with her teammates in an exhibition at the opening of the Olympic Games in Montréal 1976. In May 1977 she returned to the Stoudenska Tribouna Cup in Sofia, where she was 7th in All-Around. In December 1977 she was 4th in the All-Around at nationals in Gijón, winning bronze with hoop, 5th with ball and 4th with rope.

In 1977 she began to study Physical Education at INEF in Madrid, graduating in 1982. In 1984, the Ministry of Foreign Affairs granted her a travel bag to move to the prestigious dance company Alvin Ailey American Dance Theater in New York.
