= Africa (Perpetuum Jazzile album) =

Studio album by Perpetuum Jazzile
- Released: 30 October 2009
- Genres: Pop, jazz, funk, bossa nova
- Length: 64 min
- Label: samozaložba (self label)
- Producer: Tomaž Kozlevčar

Perpetuum Jazzile chronology
Čudna noč (2006)	Africa (2009)	Perpetuum Jazzile Live (2009)

Africa is a 2009 Perpetuum Jazzile album. The most-well known piece from the album is an a capella version of Toto's "Africa". A YouTube video showing group's performance of this song was uploaded in May 2009 and has since been viewed close to 22 million times.

== Track listing ==
1. "Africa" (D. Paich/J. Porcaro/T. Kozlevčar) – 6:18
2. "Kadar sem sama"
3. "Earth Wind & Fire Medley"
4. "Poletna noč" (M. Sepe/E. Budau/T. Kozlevčar) – 4:20
5. "Aquarela do Brasil" (A. Barroso/A. Barroso/T. Kozlevčar) – 5:34
6. "Prebujena"
7. "Libertango" (Astor Piazzolla) – 3:09
8. "Só danço samba"
9. "Prisluhni školjki" (J. Golob/M. Jesih/T. Kozlevčar) – 4:15
10. "Bee Gees Medley" – 8:42
11. "No More Blues / Chega de saudade" (A. C. Jobim/V. de Moraes/T. Kozlevčar) – 3:22
12. "Will You Be There // Ecce quomodo moritur iustus"
