= Deer Creek (Blanchard River tributary) =

- Location of mouth

Location
- Country: United States
- State: Ohio
- County: Putnam

Physical characteristics
- Source
  - coordinates: 40.994218°N 84.1732791°W
- Mouth
  - coordinates: 41.0406061°N 84.2188349°W

Basin features
- River system: Blanchard River

Deer Creek is a stream in Putnam County, Ohio. The 2.4-mile (3.9 km) long stream is a tributary of Blanchard River.

Deer Creek was named for the fact this stream was a favorite hunting ground of deer.

== See also ==
- List of rivers of Ohio
