= Afrique & Histoire =

- Discipline: History
- Language: French
- Edited by: Jean-Pierre Chrétien

Publication details
- History: 2003–2009
- Publisher: Editions Verdier (France)
- Frequency: Biannually

Standard abbreviations
- ISO 4: Afr. Hist.

Indexing
- ISSN: 1764-1977 (print); 1776-2766 (web)
- OCLC no.: 55492518

Links
- Journal homepage

Afrique & Histoire was a French peer-reviewed academic journal devoted to the study of African history from antiquity to the present day. It was established in 2003 by Peter Boilley, Jean-Pierre Chrétien, François-Xavier Fauvelle-Aymar, and Bertrand Hirsch and is published biannually by Editions Verdier. Last published volume was 7 (2009).
