= Deyanira África Melo =

Mexican sculptor

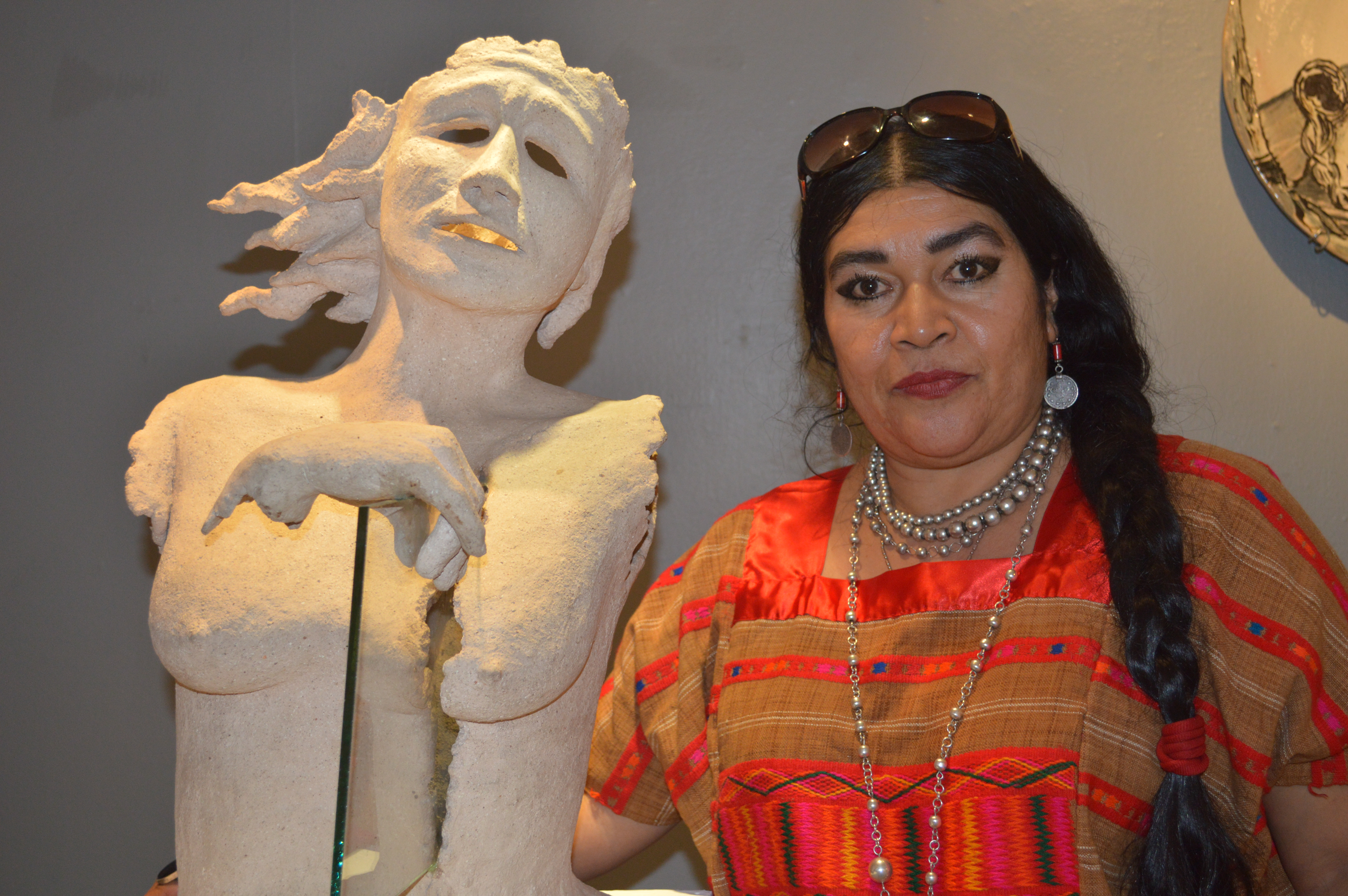
África posing with one of her works

Deyanira África González Melo is a Mexican sculptor who generally works in ceramics, depicting elements of the human form, especially the torso, generally with mutilations and other disturbing elements to dispute the otherwise traditional and sensual depictions of the human body. She has exhibited her work since studying at the Escuela Nacional de Artes Plásticas (ENAP) in Mexico as well as in Europe and the Caribbean. Her work has received recognition in Mexico and abroad, and is a member of the Salón de la Plástica Mexicana.

== Life ==
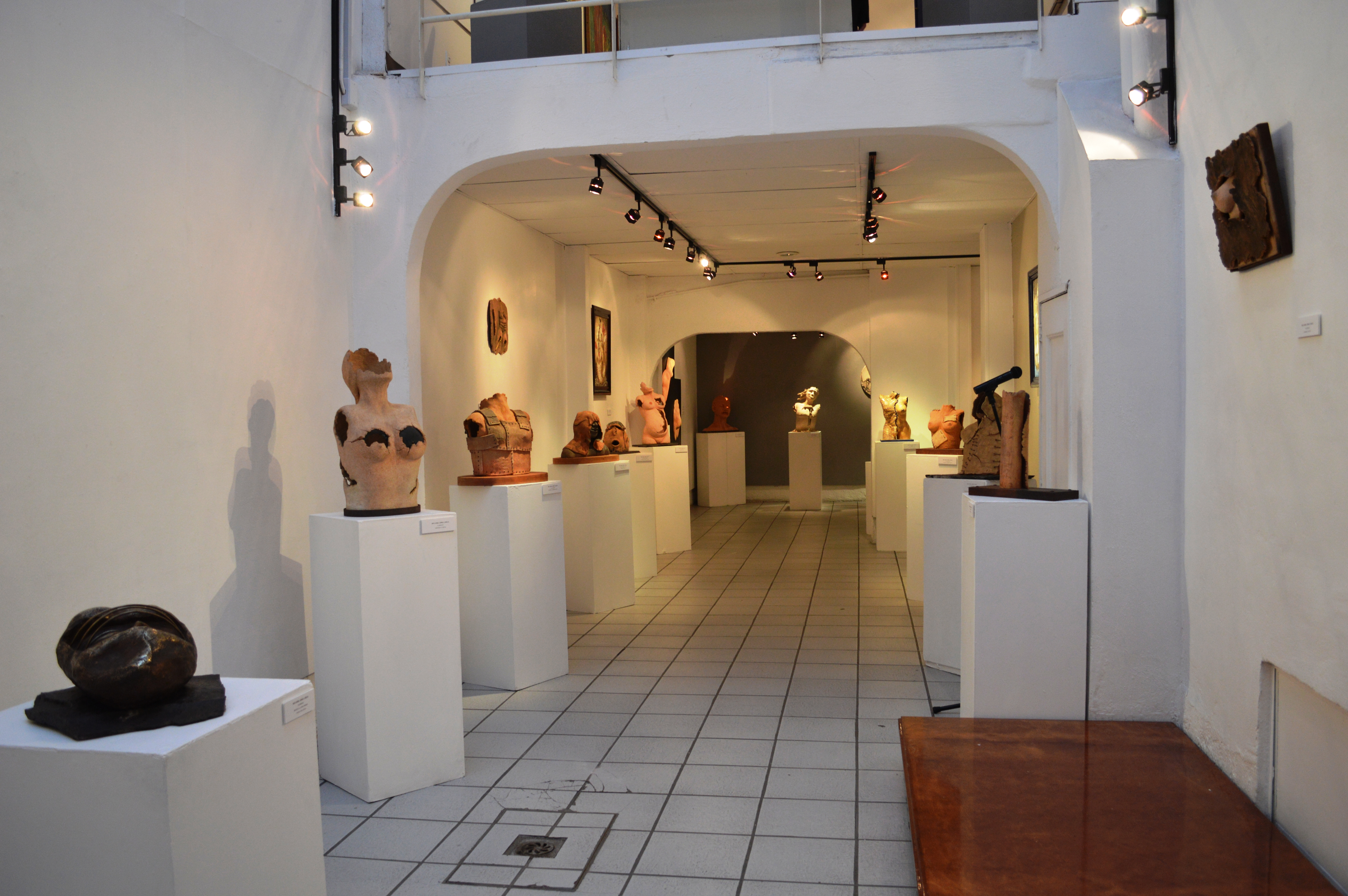
Opening of Poesía de la Vida at the Salón de la Plástica Mexicana

Deyanira África González Melo prefers to go by África informally, although this name does not indicate her origins. She was born in Putla Villa de Guerrero, Oaxaca, Mexico, and is of Indigenous, African and Italian heritage.

She began her art studies in 1977 at the Academy of San Carlos, entering the Escuela Nacional de Artes Plástica in 1980. She studied sculpture under Gerda Gruber and other subjects under Luis Nishizawa, Manuel Felguérez, Javier Anzures, Gilberto Aceves Navarro, Katy Horna, Ignacio Salazar and Juan Acha. She graduated with a bachelor's degree in visual arts in 1984. She received a second bachelors in sculpture from the (La Esmeralda) school in 1987.

From through the 1990s, she attended various other courses and programs in the arts both in Mexico and abroad. She studied wood sculpture under Leticia Moreno at ENAP and received her certificate in art education from UNAM. While she lived in Europe, she studied in various places. These include sculpting technique at the Angewandte Kunst in Vienna, urban sculpture at the University of London, history of European art at the Universite de Estudi in Florence, stone sculpture at the Laboratori Artistici di Scultura in Marmo Carlo Nicoli in Carrara, Italy, and ceramics painting of ancient Greece at the National Archaeological Museum, Athens.

Currently lives in Colonia Balbuena en Mexico City.

== Career ==
She has participated in over 225 collective exhibitions and has had over 18 individual ones in various venues in Mexico as well as Yugoslavia, Austria, Germany, Czechoslovakia, Hungary, Japan, China, Australia, Italy, Spain, France, Puerto Rico, Cuba, Denmark, Israel, Greece, Bulgaria and Serbia. Important collective exhibitions include the Maestros de La Esmeralda at the Centro Nacional de Artes, "Escultura en Cerámica" at the Casa del Lago in 1983, "El Barro den al Escultura" at the Museo de Arte Moderno in 1984, Trienal de Escultura 1985 at the Gallery of the Auditorio Nacional, "Sin Motivos Aparentes II" at the Museo de Arte Carrillo Gil in 1986 and the 1985 World Ceramics Triennial in Zagreb. Individual exhibitions include "Con el mismo barro" Casa de Lago in 1986, "Tierra de mi Sentir" at the José María Velasco Gallery of INBA in 1987, "Del Existir" at the Auditorio Principal of the Facultad de Medicina at UNAM in 1988, "Vestigios" at ENAP in 1988 and the Museo de Arte Contemporáneo in Puerto Rico in 1995.

She has exhibited in Mexico at the Museo Mural Diego Rivera, the José María Velasco Gallery of INBA, the Museo Universitario del Chopo and the Palacio de Minerá.

She was the Artist in Residence at the Brechts Haus, Kunstler und Forschwerwohnung in Svendborg, Denmark in 2009. She also received a fellowship to work in Athens, Greece in 2011, participate in a cultural exchange in Colombia.

Recognitions for her work include that of the International Academy of Ceramic Exhibition of Mexico in 1984, honorary mention at the Sculpture Triennial at the Auditorio Nacional in 1985, Obra Escultórica Internacional from Escultures, A. C. union of sculptures in Cuba, personally awarded by Rita Longa, president of CODEMA. first place in Poetry in Artwork from the Georgio la Pira International Center in Florence in 1990, work selected to represent Mexico at the 13th World Snow Festival in Grindelwald, Switzerland, honorary mention in sculpture at the II Biennial of Visual Artes at the Universidad Iberoamericana in Puebla in 1999, and recognitions at the International Women’s Day commemoration of the Venustiano Carranza borough of Mexico City in 2001 and 2006.

She was one of 52 Mexican women artists featured in the book 52 Mujeres en el Arte Mexicano: Una visión social y de género published by Secretaría de Desarrollo Social, CONACULTA and INAH. The book was part of an effort by these agencies to promote women artists. The same agencies also sponsored an exhibit her work along with 21 other from the book at the Museo de El Carmen in Mexico City.

She has been a member of the Salon de la Plástica Mexicana since 1998, which exhibits her work regularly. She has served on the Salon’s board.

In addition to her artwork, she has also taught art at both the Escuela Nacional de Artes Plásticas and the La Esmeralda.

== Artistry ==
She has written that art is her best means of communicating her thoughts and feelings to the world at large, especially her chosen specialty of sculpture. Although she has done painting and graphic art, almost all of her work is sculpture. Her preferred sculpture medium is ceramics, of small and medium size, sometimes mixed with other media such as wood.

Her work focuses on the human body, especially the female torso, although images of males and other parts of the body can appear, generally depicted sensually or sexually. Heads and faces are generally left out. The torsos often emphasize the breasts of the woman and the genitalia of both sexes. She feels that this is the most apt for expressing her emotions and ideology. Often her themes related to the pain of women who rebel against society’s norms. She also likes the colors, textures and forms that they provide. The human forms have an overall traditional form, but with expressionist and symbolic accents meant to be disturbing, such as parts of the body mutilated or missing or the use of iron pins, staple or wire. The emphasis is usually on the reproductive organs and heart as these related to emotions, especially basic ones. She considers eroticism to be “the beginning, the end and the totality of existence.” Many of the sculptures also depict pregnancy and maternity because she feels this kind of love is the strongest and feels the strongest attachments to her mother and grandmothers. When faces do appear, they are not common ones or appear in expected places. In one sculpture, a fully adult human face emerges from a womb. Even without faces, the sculptures express sadness, resignation and suffering, which are expressed through the movement of her figures.
