= Candido Africa =

Filipino physician and medical researcher

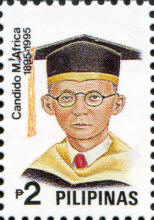
Candido Africa, featured in the Great Filipinos, Birth Centenary stamp series (1995)

Candido Macasaet Africa (October 2, 1895 – February 12, 1945) was a Filipino physician and medical researcher. He served as an associate professor of parasitology at the School of Hygiene and Public Health, University of the Philippines. His research achieved international recognition in the field of parasitology, with a particular focus on parasites known to cause heart failure.

== Life ==
Candido Macasaet Africa was born in Lipa, Batangas, Philippines, on October 2, 1895. He obtained his medical degree from the College of Medicine of the University of the Philippines in 1920. In 1929, he pursued further studies at the London School of Hygiene and Tropical Medicine, where he earned a degree in Tropical Medicine. That same year, he became a Fellow at the Tropen Institute of Hamburg, Germany. In 1930, Africa received a grant from the Rockefeller Foundation, enabling him to study at Harvard University and Johns Hopkins University. He subsequently graduated from Johns Hopkins University in 1931 with a degree in parasitology.

In 1932, Africa was appointed head of the Department of Parasitology and associate professor at the University of the Philippines. Throughout his career, he was actively involved in several scientific organizations, including the American Society of Parasitologists, the Philippine Scientific Society, and the Philippine Medical Association.

Africa served as a medical practitioner for the Philippine government until the outbreak of World War II in 1941. He died on February 12, 1945 during the liberation of Manila.

== Research ==
Africa discovered four species of human flukes, parasitic organisms that attach to the heart, leading to disease and, in some cases, death. In collaboration with Dr. Eusebio Y. Garcia, he identified a new species of parasite in dogs, Heterophyes expentans, which has since been synonymized with H. continua. In 1937, Africa and Garcia discovered Plagiorchis philippinensis. The following year, Africa described Haplorchis vanissimus from a naturally infected individual in the Philippines. He made significant contributions to the understanding of the life cycle of Ascaris and the epidemiology of Schistosomiasis japonica.

Africa was among the first parasitologists to describe cases of heterophyiasis in the human heart. According to a series of papers co-authored by Africa, Garcia, and Walfrido de Leon, their research suggested that certain health conditions in humans, such as heart dilation, chronic heart muscle damage, and lesions in the brain and spinal cord, were associated with the presence of heterophyid eggs in the blood vessels. These eggs, typically found in other hosts, can migrate to the human intestinal wall, die, and release their eggs into the bloodstream, potentially causing these conditions.

In addition to his work on flukes, Africa conducted research on the causes and prevention of malaria.

== Recognition ==
Africa's work was compiled into special volumes and exhibited at various universities. In 1937, his research was featured during Dr. Sadao Yoshida's silver jubilee at the Institute for Research in Microbic Diseases, Osaka Imperial University in Japan. It was also showcased during Dr. Sadamu Yokogawa's silver jubilee at the Taihoku Imperial University, Formosa (present-day Taiwan), as well as during the 30th anniversary of Dr. K.J. Skrajabin's professorship at the All-Union Institute of Helminthology in Moscow, Soviet Union.

Owing to his international reputation, Africa visited several leading laboratories to conduct experiments, including those in London, Liverpool, Edinburgh, Paris, Berlin, Vienna, Rome, and Utrecht.

Following his death, Africa was posthumously recognized as an Outstanding Alumnus of the University of the Philippines in medical science in 1964.

== Selected publications ==
- Africa, Candido M.; Garcia, E.Y.; De Leon, W. (1940). "Visceral complications in intestinal heterophyidiasis of man" (PDF). Acta Medica Philippina (Monographic Series). 1 (1): 1–132.
- Africa, Candido M. (1931). "Studies on the Host Relations of Nippostrongylus muris, with Special Reference to Age Resistance and Acquired Immunity". The Journal of Parasitology. 18 (1): 1–13. doi:10.2307/3271737. ISSN 0022-3395. JSTOR 3271737.
- Africa, Candido M. (1931). "Studies on the Activity of the Infective Larvae of the Rat Strongylid, Nippostrongylus muris". The Journal of Parasitology. 17 (4): 196–206. doi:10.2307/3271455. ISSN 0022-3395. JSTOR 3271455.
