= África de las Heras =

Spanish spy and intelligence agent

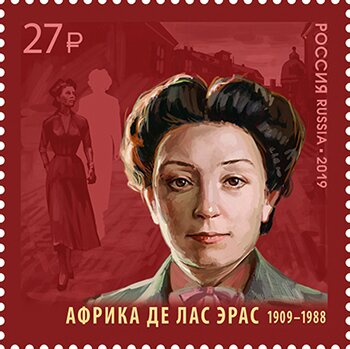
África de las Heras on a 2019 stamp of Russia

África de las Heras Gavilán (26 April 1909 – 8 March 1988) was a Spanish-born communist and naturalized Soviet citizen who was born in Ceuta south of the Strait of Gibraltar and died in Moscow. She was a secret service agent who went by the code name "Patria", but also used the names "María Luisa de las Heras de Darbat","María de la Sierra","Patricia", "Ivonne", "María de las Heras", "Znoi" and "María Pavlovna". Originally a member of the Communist Party of Spain, de las Heras participated in various Soviet intelligence operations both during and after the Spanish Civil War. Though she had been exhibited by Pavel Sudoplatov as the secretary of Trotsky in Norway and in Mexico, the number of assassination teams to kill Trotsky that were assisted by de las Heras, was never known. Later she stopped her own direct actions and their support and trained other KGB agents in Moscow.
