= Paint Creek (Sevenmile Creek tributary) =

Stream in Preble County, Ohio, U.S.

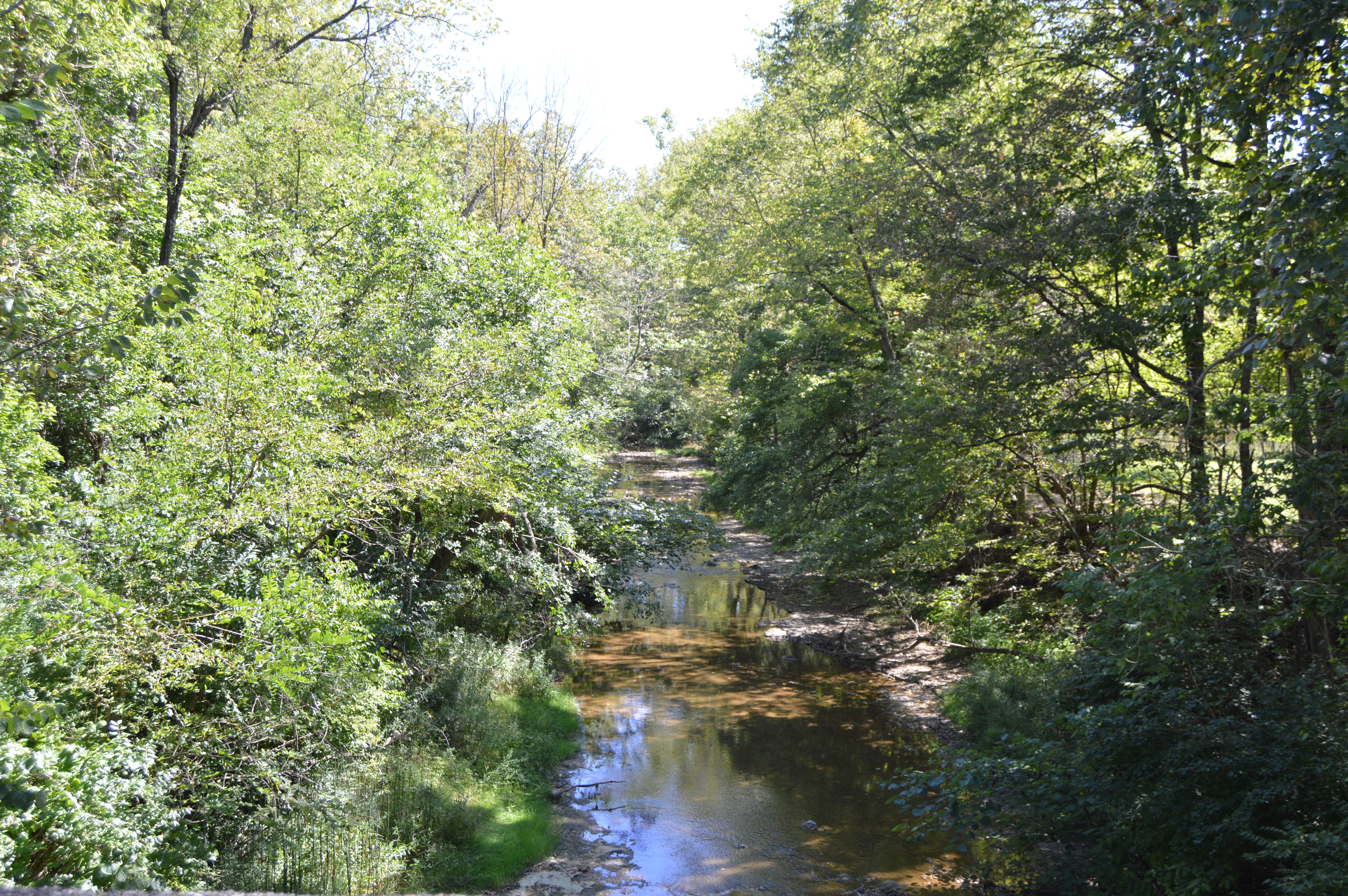
Overview from the Dillman Road bridge

Paint Creek is a stream in Preble County, Ohio, in the United States. It is a tributary of Sevenmile Creek.

Paint Creek was named from deposits of ochre found there which Native Americans used for body painting.

Paint Creek is dammed to form a reservoir, Lake Lakengren.

== Location ==
- Mouth: Confluence with Sevenmile Creek south of Camden at 39°37′04″N 84°38′54″W
- Source: Preble County west of Eaton at 39°44′08″N 84°42′18″W
- Lake Lakengren Dam: 39°40′32″N 84°41′19″W

== See also ==
- List of rivers of Ohio
