= Africa, Indiana =

- Unincorporated community
- Location within Indiana Location within the United States
- Coordinates: 37°50′25″N 87°04′22″W
- Country: United States
- State: Indiana
- County: Spencer
- Township: Ohio
- Elevation: 384 ft (117 m)
- Time zone: UTC-6 (Central (CST))
  - Summer (DST): UTC-5 (CDT)
- ZIP code: 47635
- Area code: 812
- GNIS feature ID: 430026

Africa is a former settlement in Ohio Township, Spencer County, in the U.S. state of Indiana.

The area south of the town of Rockport was settled following the Civil War by African Americans. Africa was one such settlement in the area (its post office was called Pueblo) and faced repeated tensions with the majority-white towns in the area, although the Indianapolis News opined in 1900 "If Spencer county has no trouble until it comes from Africa, it will rest in peace for ages."
