= Alum Creek (Ohio) =

River in Ohio, US

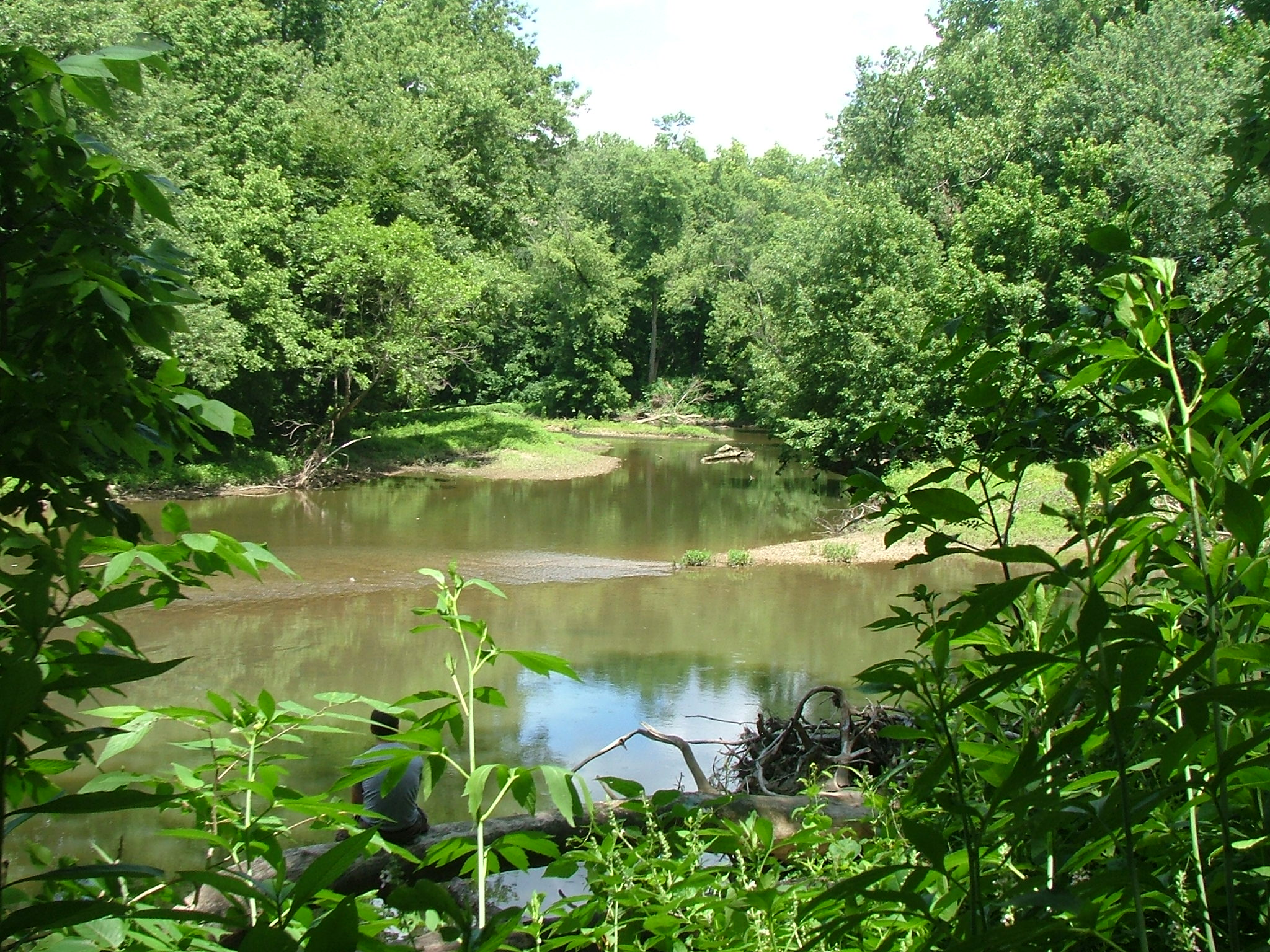
- The confluence of the Alum Creek and Big Walnut Creek. Alum Creek is in the center of the image and Big Walnut Creek is coming from the right.

Location
- Country: United States of America

Physical characteristics
- Source
  - location: 40°32′00″N 082°49′02″W 1 mile (1.6 km) South-West of Mount Gilead
  - elevation: 1,160 ft (350 m)
- Mouth
  - location: 39°52′52″N 082°54′27″W Big Walnut Creek near Obetz, Ohio
  - elevation: 718 ft (219 m)
- Basin size: 199 mi^{2} (520 km^{2})
- Discharge
  - location: Columbus
  - average: 195.6 cu ft/s (5.54 m^{3}/s), USGS water years 1974-1998

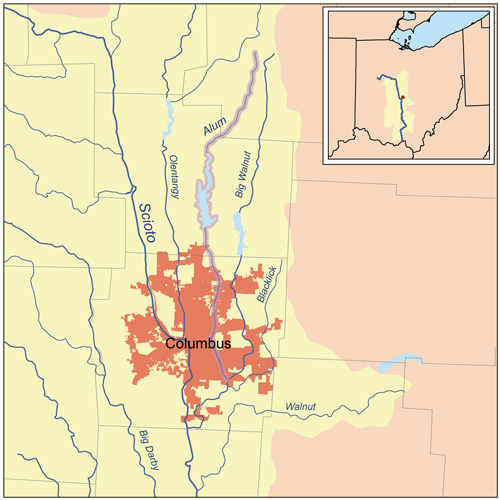
Map of Alum Creek highlighted within the Scioto River watershed

Alum Creek is a 58-mile (93 km) long creek that runs north to south in central Ohio. The creek originates in Morrow County and then flows through Delaware County and finally into Franklin County, where it ends at Big Walnut Creek, which drains into the Scioto River. Alum Creek is a source of drinking water for the city of Westerville, Ohio. It has also been known as Allum Creek, Elk Creek, Seckle Creek, Sepung Creek, and Salt Creek.

== History ==
The Alum Creek valley was inhabited by the Adena over 2,000 years ago. This mound builder culture constructed seven mounds along Alum Creek. The Lenape (Delaware) Indian tribe later established many settlements near the creek. The word "Alum" came from Native American languages.

One of the first European settlers was Colonel Moses Byxbe, who constructed his home on Alum Creek in 1805. Colonel Byxbe owned or co-owned 38,000 acres (150 km^{2}) along the creek.

As a defensive measure during the War of 1812, local residents built four blockhouses in the area, including one on Alum Creek. The blockhouse, Fort Cheshire, was a 2-story log fortress, constructed so as to provide a place from which to shoot, drop boiling water, and defend against the threat of fire. The blockhouse was subsequently used as a schoolhouse and remained intact until the Civil War. The fort is commemorated by a bronze plaque where the blockhouse once stood.

=== Underground Railroad ===
The history of Alum Creek is also notable for its connection to the Underground Railroad, by which many slaves found their freedom. The Underground Railroad's Sycamore Trail ran along Alum Creek. Africa Road, near Alum Creek, is so named because of the nearby settlement of thirty freed slaves from North Carolina. In 2003 a plaque was erected in associated with The Ohio Historical Society to commemorate its significance.

== Course ==
Alum Creek rises near Mt. Gilead, Ohio and runs south, where it joins with Bunker Run, Indigo Creek, and West Branch Alum Creek. It then flows into Alum Creek Lake, along with Big Run. It flows out of the reservoir through Alum Creek Dam, and joins with several tributaries. It flows through Westerville, Ohio and Columbus, Ohio, before joining with Big Walnut Creek with Blacklick Creek in Three Creeks Metro Park.

== Watershed ==
=== Alum Creek Lake ===
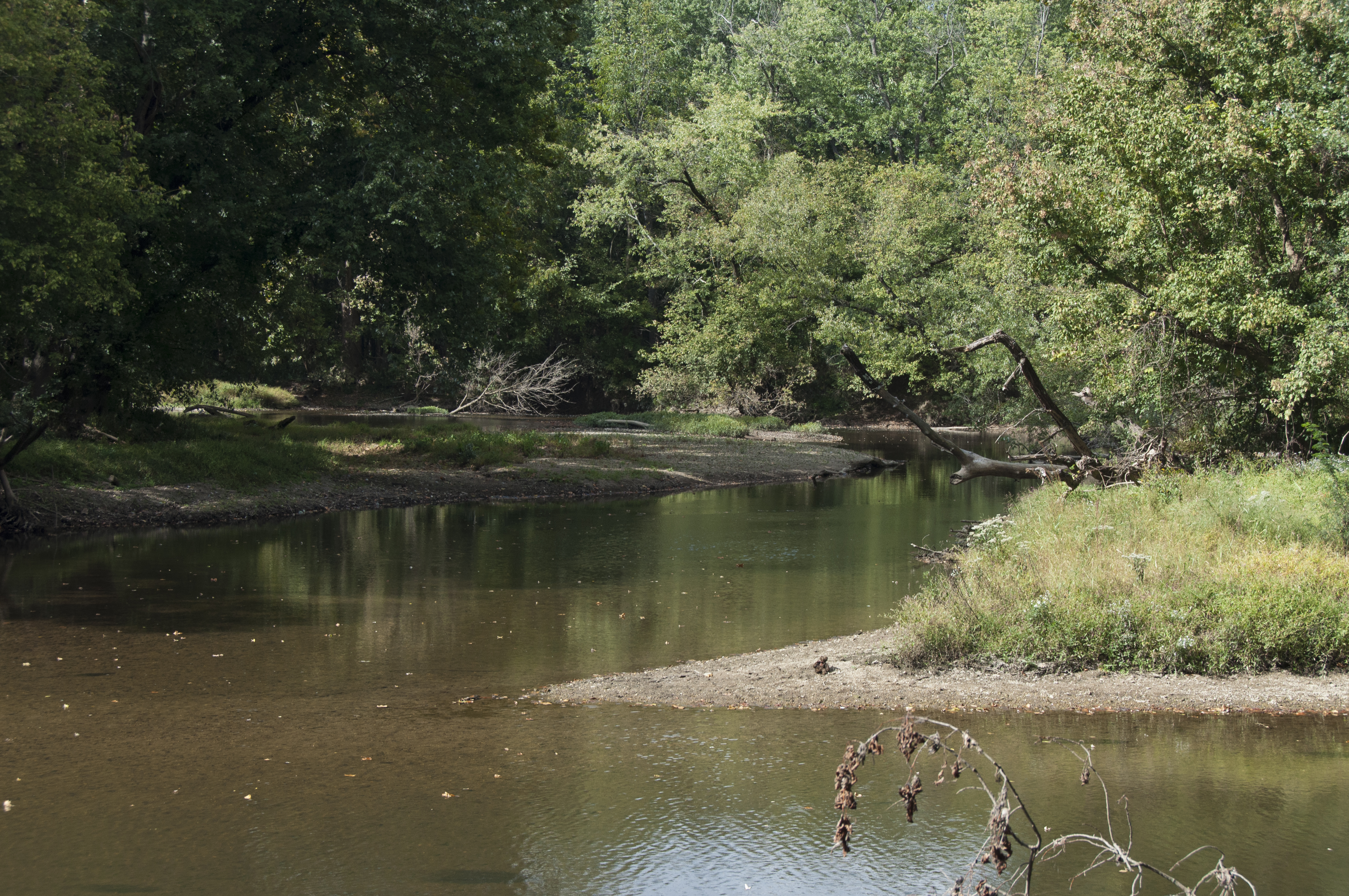
Alum Creek joining Big Walnut Creek

Near 40°10′36″N 082°57′24″W Elevation: 833 feet (254 m)

In 1974, the Army Corps of Engineers completed the Alum Creek Reservoir near the middle portion of the creek length. The reservoir has a surface area of 3,387 acres (1,371 ha) of water and was created to ensure a water supply for the city of Columbus, provide flood control for the area south of the reservoir, and yield recreational opportunities.

=== Alum Creek Lake Dam ===
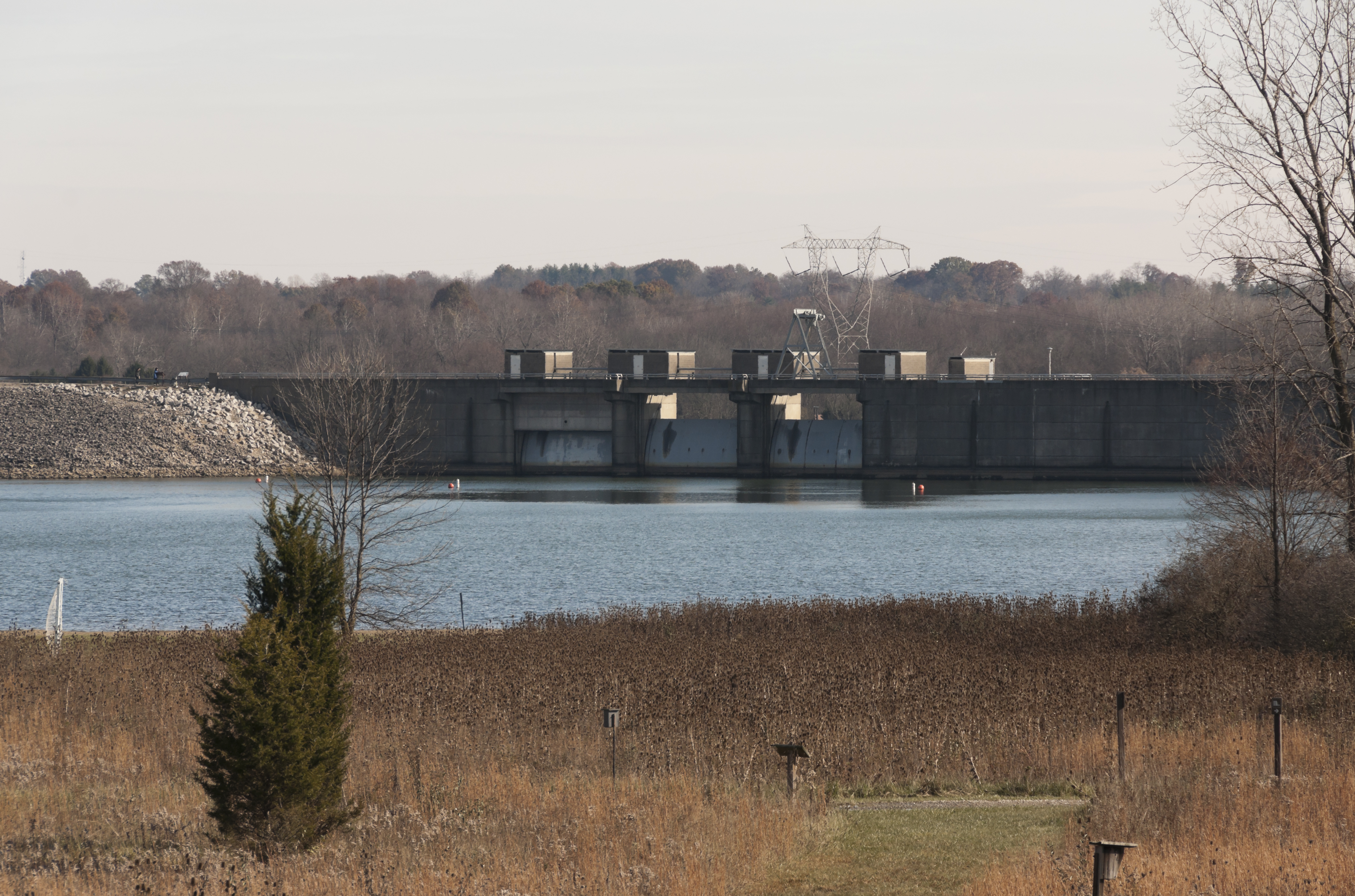
Alum Creek Dam

Near 40°10′36″N 082°57′24″W Elevation: 833 feet (254 m)

Alum Creek Dam is part of the flood control plan for the Ohio River basin. Construction of the dam was authorized by the United States Congress as part of the Flood Control Act of 1962. Dam construction began in 1970 and was completed in 1974 by the United States Army Corps of Engineers.

The Dam is located in Delaware County and its construction created Alum Creek Lake.

=== Tributaries ===
- West Branch Alum Creek
- Indigo Creek
- Bunker Run

== See also ==
- List of rivers of Ohio
