= Big Walnut Creek =

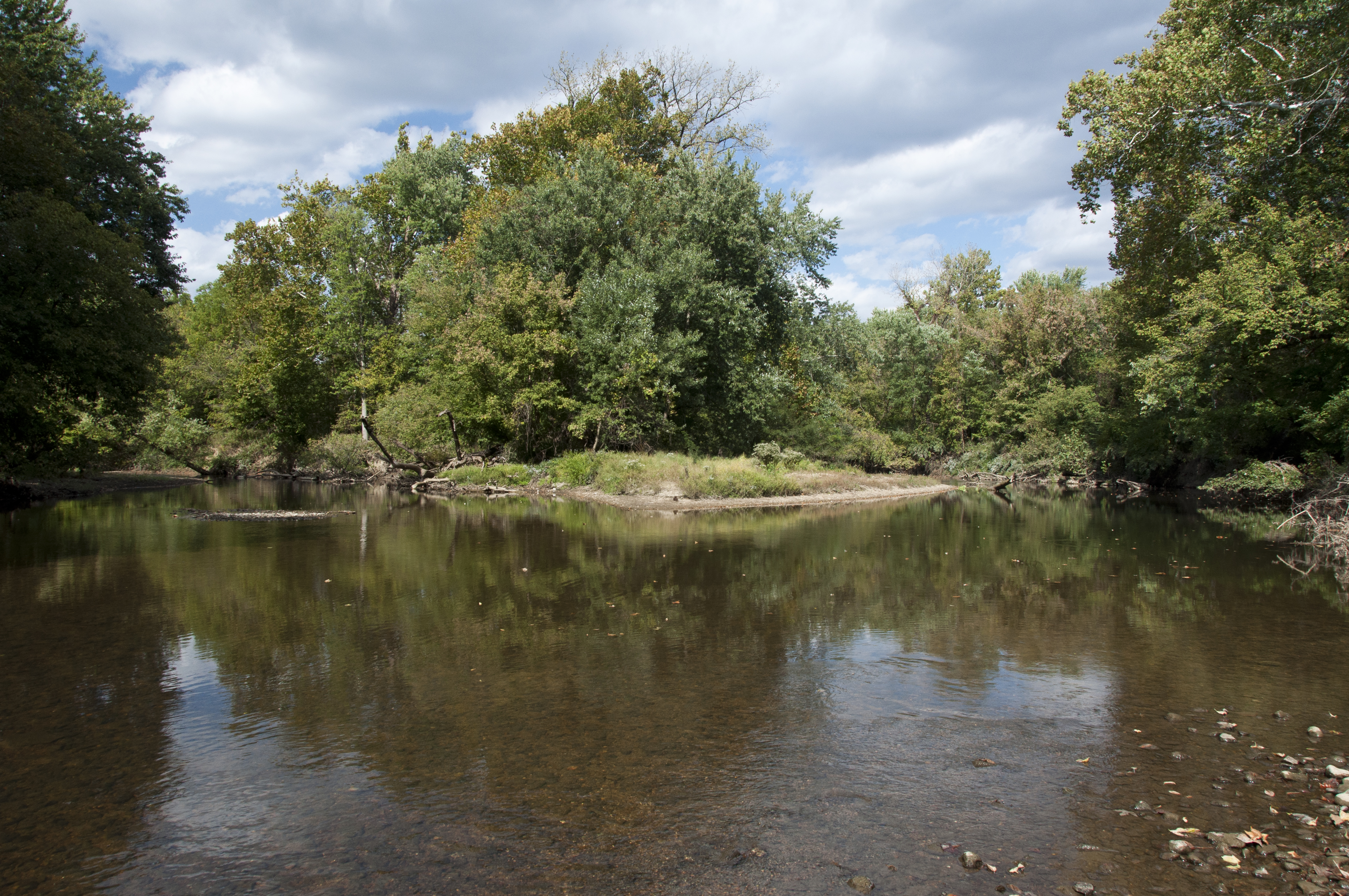
- The confluence of Big Walnut Creek and Alum Creek at Three Creeks Metro Park

Physical characteristics
- Source
  - location: ~ 1 mi (1.6 km) southwest of Mount Gilead, Ohio
  - elevation: ~ 1,180 ft (360 m)
- Mouth
  - location: Scioto River near Lockbourne, Ohio
  - elevation: ~ 665 ft (203 m)
- Basin size: 557 mi^{2} (1,440 km^{2})
- Discharge
  - location: Rees
  - average: 529.4 cu ft/s (14.99 m^{3}/s), USGS water years 1974-2019

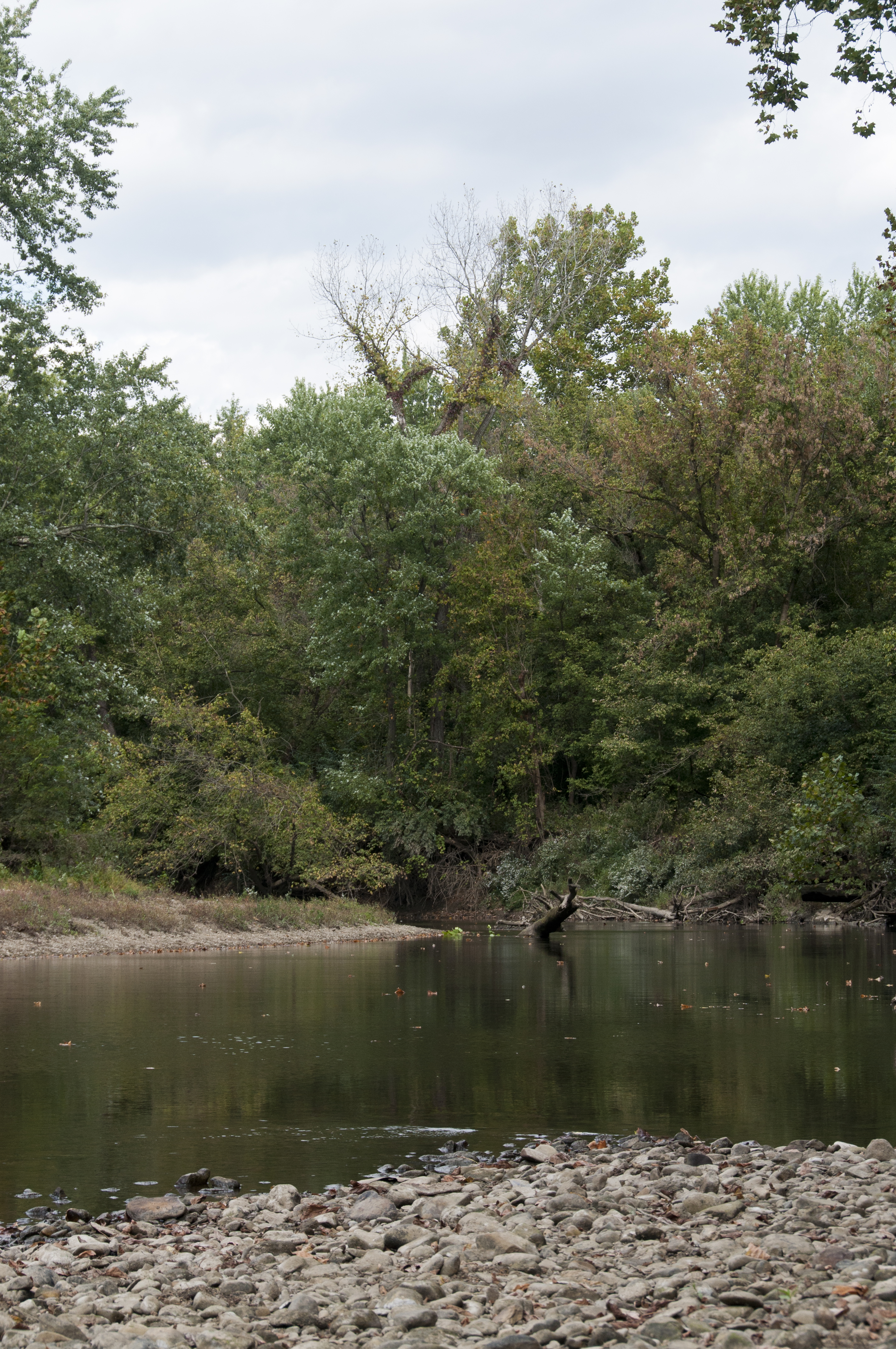

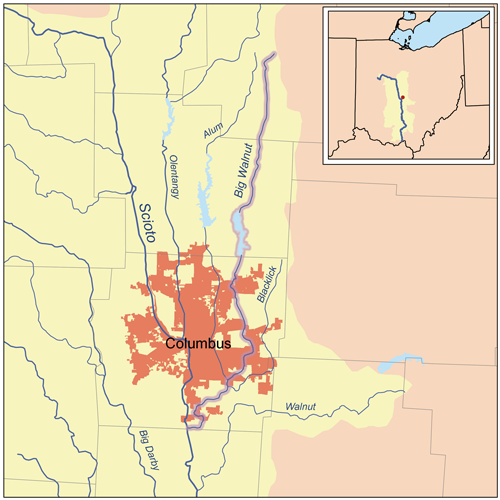
Map of Big Walnut Creek highlighted within the Scioto River watershed.

Big Walnut Creek starts near Mount Gilead, Ohio, in Morrow County. It flows south to eastern Delaware County and parallels Alum Creek. It passes to the east of Sunbury and into Hoover Reservoir, which then crosses into Franklin County. From the dam outflow in Westerville the creek flows through Gahanna and Whitehall. Near Obetz it is joined by its principal tributaries Alum Creek and Blacklick Creek at the Three Creeks Columbus Metro Park. It flows through southern Franklin County and joins the Scioto River near the Franklin-Pickaway Counties line at 39°47′57″N 83°00′34″W.

== Name ==
Big Walnut Creek was named for black walnut trees which once grew in old-growth forests near the stream. According to the Geographic Names Information System, the Big Walnut Creek has also been known as:

- Big Belly Creek
- Big Bellys Creek
- Big Lick Creek
- Gahanna River
- Hayes Ditch
- Walnut Creek
- Whingwy Mahoni Sepung
- Menkwi Mhoani Siipunk

== See also ==
- List of rivers of Ohio
