= Africa, Ohio =

- unincorporated community
- Location within Ohio Location within the United States Location within North America
- Coordinates: 40°10′56″N 82°57′26″W
- Country: United States
- State: Ohio
- County: Delaware
- Township: Orange
- Elevation: 856 ft (261 m)
- Time zone: UTC-5 (Eastern (EST))
  - Summer (DST): UTC-4 (EDT)
- GNIS feature ID: 1064302

Africa is an unincorporated community located in Orange Township of southern Delaware County, Ohio, United States, by Alum Creek.

== History ==
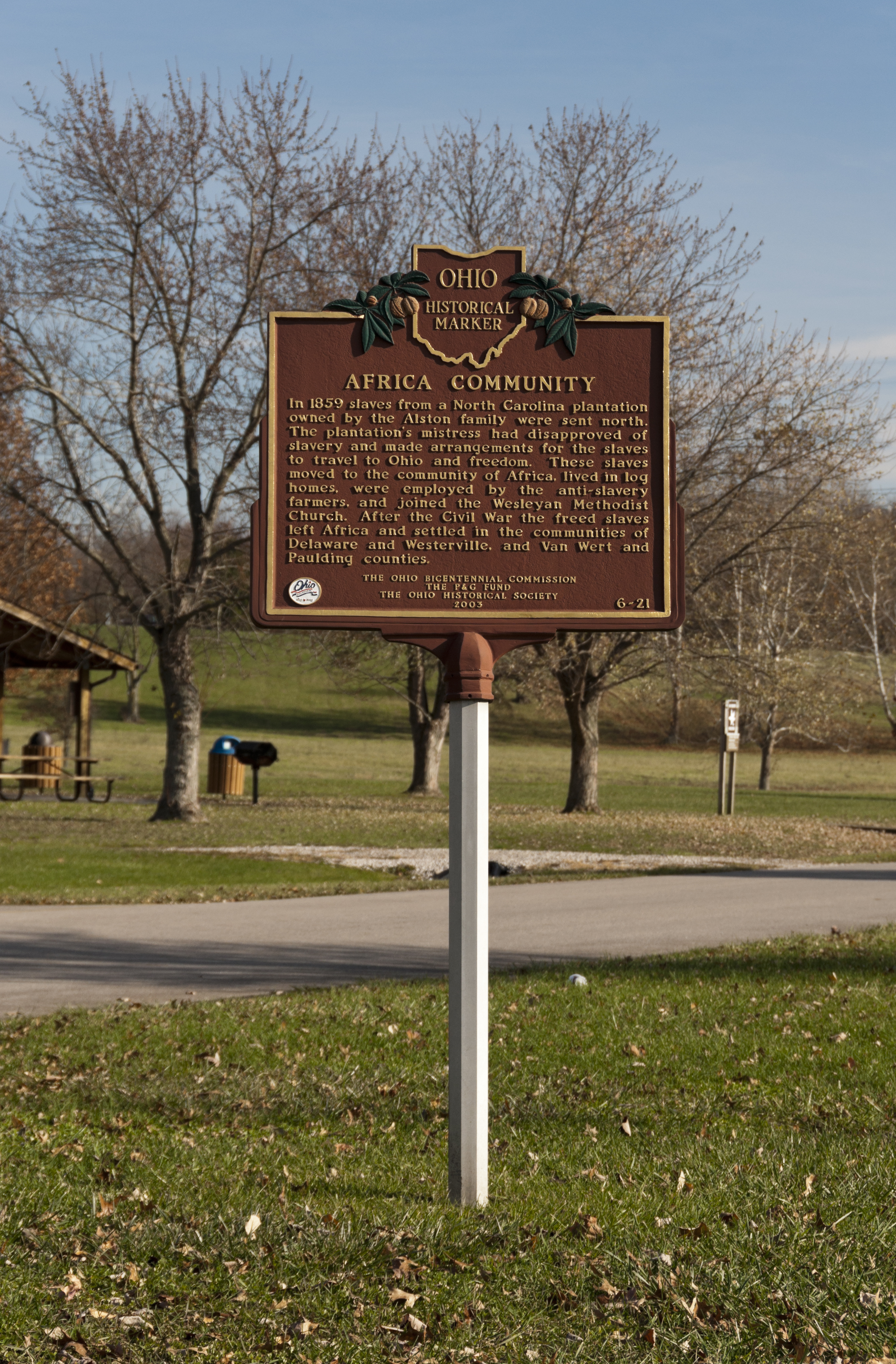
Africa community historical marker

Africa is named after the Underground Railroad and is thought to be the only town in the world named after the Underground Railroad. Its first church is thought to have been a Methodist church that was established on the east side of Alum Creek in approximately 1828. In 1843, the slavery question separated its congregation. The antislavery portion organized the Wesleyan Church on the east side of Alum Creek. The first services were held in a cabin on the Alum Creek flats near the Patterson residence. In 1876, members of the congregation built a church, located in present-day Africa.

A historic marker in the area recounts the history of how the community was divided by the slavery question and of how Africa received its name:

Samuel Patterson arrived in East Orange in 1824 and, within a few years, began to hide runaway slaves in his home. He also invited anti-slavery speakers to the pulpit of the East Orange Methodist Church, which brought Patterson and his neighbors into conflict with the bishop. Following their consciences, they became the Wesleyan Methodists and built a new church. A pro-slavery neighbor mocked them by calling their community Africa, and so East Orange was renamed. The village has disappeared but several homes owned by Patterson and his neighbors still stand in this vicinity.

The reverse side of the marker adds the following information:

In 1859 slaves from a North Carolina plantation owned by the Alston family were sent north. The plantation's mistress had disapproved of slavery and made arrangements for the slaves to travel to Ohio and freedom. These slaves moved to the community of Africa, lived in log homes, were employed by the anti-slavery farmers and joined the Wesleyan Methodist Church. After the Civil War the freed slaves left Africa and settled in the communities of Delaware and Westerville, and Van Wert and Paulding counties.

The Patterson family built their original double log cabin in the 1820s. Sometime near the year and 1840, family members built a mansion on the east side of Alum Creek. This and additional homes built by the Pattersons still stand, and these buildings were important Underground Railroad stations.

This particular Underground Railroad route assumed national importance because of its relationship to two famous songwriters. A station north of the Patterson farm was in Mt. Vernon, the home of Dan Emmett. In 1842, Emmett and three other men formed the Virginia Minstrels. Emmett wrote "Old Dan Tucker," "Dixie," "Turkey in the Straw," and "The Blue Tail Fly." "Dixie" became popular immediately and, as the Civil War began troops of both North and the South armies marched to this tune, but by the end of 1861, Dixie had become a Southern song. Emmett was not a Southern sympathizer and was not pleased when the Confederacy adopted his tune as its unofficial "National Anthem." The Virginia Minstrels are today considered the nation's first true minstrel troop. Around the turn of the 20th century, this form evolved into vaudeville and later into Broadway productions.

=== Benjamin Hanby and Africa, Ohio ===
The station to the south of the Patterson place was in Westerville, Ohio. Here Benjamin Hanby, an Otterbein College student, heard the story a sick slave had told about his sweetheart, Nelly Gray, who had been sold down the river. He wanted to get to Canada and earn money to buy Nelly's freedom, but he died. Hanby began to write a song. Later a Kentucky slave auction stirred him to compose more stanzas and he added a chorus. This song became the well-known "Darling Nelly Gray." The song recounts the tale of Nelly, who white men bound in chains and took to Georgia, working her in the cotton as she slowly died.

Hanby also wrote the Christmas carol "Up on the House Top," and the Christian hymn "Who Is He In Yonder Stall?" As a result of his thematic emphasis, Hanby has been dubbed the "Uncle Tom's Cabin" of song. Songs such as these and writings, such as those of Ohioan Harriet Beecher Stowe's Uncle Tom's Cabin, sensitized northerners to the conditions of slavery and helped to initiate the anti-slavery movement. Hanby's home is now a historic landmark standing adjacent to the Otterbein University campus. Hanby's grave is in the nearby Otterbein Cemetery in Westerville, Ohio.

=== Africa today ===
Alum Creek State Park is an adjacent recreation area in this region of central Ohio, and the park receives over three million visitors annually. Because the town of Africa is located next to this park and located within sight of the Alum Creek Dam, many visitors will recognize the town and the road, but may not be aware of the area's historic significance.

Africa, Ohio was "saluted" on the country music television show "Hee Haw" in 1973. At that time it had a population of 16.

== Geography ==
Africa is adjacent to the Alum Creek State Park, an Ohio recreation area, on Africa Road, which roughly follows the Underground Railroad route that escaping slaves took before the American Civil War. Africa began as Orange Station, and some early accounts described the area as the "East Orange Post Office." Orange Station at one time had a post office, a general store, and a saloon.
