= Nettleton =

Nettleton may refer to:

== People with the surname ==
- Thomas Nettleton (1683–1742), English physician
- Asahel Nettleton (1783–1844), American theologian and pastor, evangelist in the Second Great Awakening
- Charles Nettleton (1826–1902), Australian photographer
- Stiles R. Nettleton (1834-1911), American politician
- Louise Nettleton (née Dyer) (1874-1954), British archery champion and mountaineer
- John Dering Nettleton (1917–1943), South African aviator and Victoria Cross recipient
- Ernie Nettleton (1918–2005), English professional footballer
- Lois Nettleton (1927–2008), American actress
- John Nettleton (actor) (1929–2023), English actor
- Catherine Nettleton (born 1960), British diplomat
- Paul Nettleton, Canadian lawyer and politician

== Places ==
=== England ===
- Nettleton, Lincolnshire
- Nettleton, Wiltshire
- Nettleton Hill, a hamlet in Kirklees District, West Yorkshire

=== United States ===
- Nettleton, Kansas
- Nettleton, Mississippi
- Nettleton, Missouri
- Nettleton High School (disambiguation)
- Nettleton School District (disambiguation)
- Nettleton Township, Craighead County, Arkansas, an Arkansas township

== Other uses ==
- Nettleton, American folk tune to which the Christian hymn "Come Thou Fount of Every Blessing" is set
- Nettleton Stadium, a baseball stadium in Chico, California, United States
