= Ohio State Route 605 =

State highway in central Ohio, US

State Route 605
- New Albany–Condit Road

Route information
- Maintained by ODOT
- Length: 9.38 mi (15.10 km)
- Existed: 1937–present

Major junctions
- South end: US 62 in New Albany
- North end: SR 37 near Sunbury

Location
- Country: United States
- State: Ohio
- Counties: Franklin, Delaware

Highway system
- Ohio State Highway System; Interstate; US; State; Scenic
← SR 604	→ SR 606

State Route 605 (SR 605) is a 9.38-mile-long (15.10 km) north–south state highway in central Ohio. The southern terminus of SR 605 is at a signalized intersection with U.S. Route 62 (US 62) in the northeastern Columbus suburb of New Albany. Its northern terminus is also at SR 37, a signalized intersection approximately 3 miles (4.8 km) southeast of Sunbury. The route was designated in 1937, and the northern terminus was moved in 1994.

== Route description ==
SR 605 runs through the northeastern corner of Franklin County and the southeastern portion of Delaware County. 5,470 vehicles travel the road on average daily near the southern terminus, and 3,840 near the northern terminus. It starts at a signalized intersection with US 62 in downtown New Albany. The route quickly leaves downtown New Albany and heads northward. SR 605 soon crosses over SR 161 using a bridge, and intersects Walton Parkway. Here, houses slowly transition to farmland. The road then intersects Bevelheimer Road and crosses into Delaware County, in the middle of large fields. A few miles into Delaware County, SR 605 crosses Center Village Road in the unincorporated village of Center Village. Soon after, SR 605 ends at the signalized intersection of SR 37 and continues as County Road 605.

== History ==
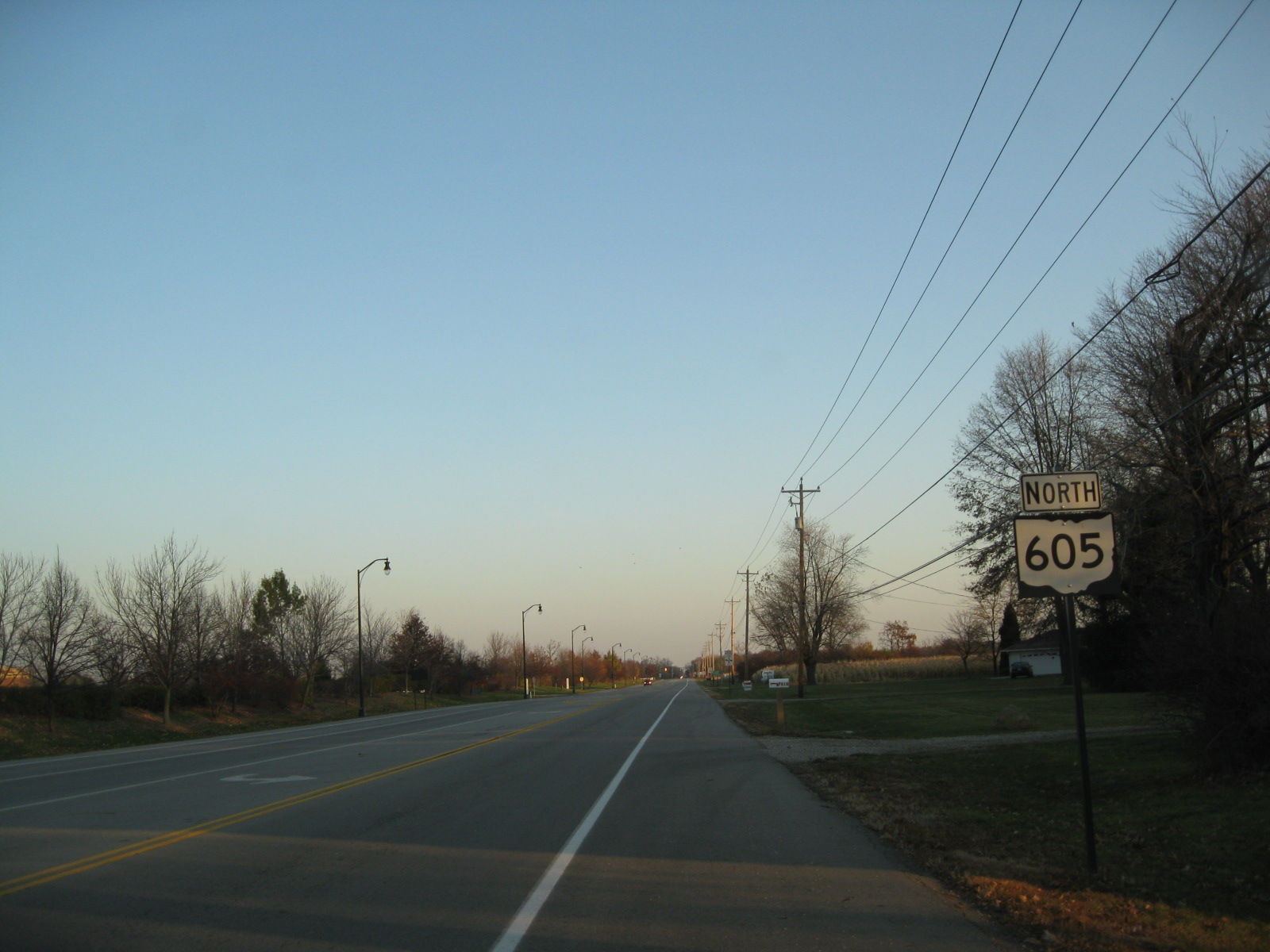
State Route 605 northbound in New Albany

A road from New Albany to north of Center Village first appeared on maps in 1924. In 1929, the road was extended to connect to Condit. SR 605 was designated in 1937, following the alignment from US 62, to a junction with the US 36/SR 3 concurrency in Condit. By 1994, jurisdiction of the portion of SR 605 between SR 37 and the US 36/SR 3 concurrency was transferred from the Ohio Department of Transportation (ODOT) to Delaware County, who renamed the road to County Road 605. As a result of this move, SR 605 took on the routing that it does today.

== Major intersections ==
County	Location	mi	km	Destinations	Notes
Franklin	New Albany	0.00	0.00	US 62 (Main Street) to SR 161 / South High Street	
Delaware	Trenton Township	9.38	15.10	SR 37 / CR 605 – Sunbury, Johnstown	
1.000 mi = 1.609 km; 1.000 km = 0.621 mi
