= Dublin City School District (Ohio) =

School district

Coordinates: 40°6′33″N 83°8′25″W

Address
- 5175 Emerald Pkwy Dublin, Ohio United States

District information
- Type: Public-Suburban
- Grades: PK-12
- Superintendent: Jen Schwanke
- NCES District ID: 3904702

Students and staff
- Students: 16,400
- Teachers: 838.46
- Staff: 2,435.8
- Student–teacher ratio: 19.39
- Athletic conference: Ohio Capital Conference

Other information
- Website: www.dublinschools.net

The Dublin City School District, also known as Dublin City Schools, is a public school district in Ohio. It encompasses 47 square miles (120 km^{2}), and serves most of the city of Dublin, Ohio, as well as part of the city of Columbus, and unincorporated parts of Delaware and Union Counties.

In the fall of 2022, district enrollment exceeded 16,000 students attending its twenty-two schools.

== Boundary ==
In Franklin County, the district includes most of Dublin and sections of Columbus and Upper Arlington. The district covers portions of Washington Township and Perry Township.

In Delaware County, the district includes that county's portion of Dublin, and Shawnee Hills. The sections in the county cover part of Washington Township.

In Union County, the district includes that county's portion of Dublin as well as a portion of the New California census-designated place. The sections in the county cover part of Jerome Township.

== Curriculum ==
As a PK-5 district, Dublin City Schools offers a foundational skills and content based curriculum. For middle school students, the district is focused on the student experience in pathways and core areas. The curriculum of the three high schools in the Dublin City School District includes AP, IB, CCP and pathway focused academies.

== Demographics ==
The Dublin City Schools student body represents more than 100 countries and speaks more than 70 different languages.

The Dublin City School District’s English Learner Department (EL) has continued to grow each year. The district currently ranks as the 6th largest EL population in the state of Ohio. The district’s EL students represent approximately 70 countries and speak 70 different languages. The top languages currently spoken by the students in the EL program are Spanish, Arabic, Japanese, Korean and Chinese.

A ReMax real estate agent named Akiko Miyamoto stated in Car Talk that the services provided for Japanese speakers by the school district attract Japanese expatriates to Dublin. The district offers Japanese interpreters who send e-mails written in Japanese, provide interpretation services at school events, and translate documents.

In 2007, Wyandot Elementary School had 568 students, including 94 Asian students, with most of them being Japanese. To serve English as a second language students, Wyandot, in 2007, had collection of 150 books in Japanese, Korean, Spanish, and French in its library, including works by Japanese authors and translations of American children's books. Many Japanese and Korean families, as of that year, donated foreign language books to the library.

== Schools ==
=== Elementary schools ===
- Albert Chapman Elementary School
- Daniel Wright Elementary School
- Hopewell Elementary School
- Eli Pinney Elementary School
- Glacier Ridge Elementary School
- Griffith Thomas Elementary School
- Deane Brown Bishop Elementary School
- Indian Run Elementary School
- Mary Emma Bailey Elementary School
- Olde Sawmill Elementary School
- Riverside Elementary School
- Scottish Corners Elementary School
- Wyandot Elementary School
- Deer Run Elementary School
- Abraham Depp Elementary School
- Bishop Elementary School

=== Middle schools ===
- Ann Simpson Davis Middle School
- John Sells Middle School
- Willard Grizzell Middle School
- Henry Karrer Middle School
- Eversole Run Middle School

=== High schools ===
- Emerald Campus (Note: This is not a fourth high school, but rather an extension of the three)
- Dublin Coffman High School
- Dublin Jerome High School
- Dublin Scioto High School

== Awards ==
In 2023, the Dublin City School District graduated 1,218 students, which included 576 honors diplomas, 81 college-signed athletes, 33 International Baccalaureate (IB) Diploma Candidates, 25 National Merit Finalists, 11 students committed to the military, and 9 President Scholars. This 2023 class achieved a 4.1 graduation readiness per student, more than double the state minimum.

- Dublin Jerome High School received a 2010 Blue Ribbon School award from the United States Department of Education.
- Willard Grizzell Middle School received a 2009 Blue Ribbon School award from the United States Department of Education.
- All 3 high schools were identified among America's Best High Schools 2011, a ranking of the top 300 national high schools by Newsweek.
- Wyandot Elementary School received a 2017 Blue Ribbon School award from the United States Department of Education.
- The Dublin City Schools district is ranked A+ and listed as the #1 Best School District in the Columbus area on Niche.com., and all three high schools are ranked in the top 25 in Ohio.
- The district received five stars in Progress, Gap Closing, and Graduation, and four stars in Achievement on the Ohio School Report Card.
