= Fulton Creek =

Fulton Creek may refer to:

- Fulton Creek (North Saskatchewan River), a stream in Canada
- Fulton Creek (Ohio), a stream in the United States
