= Alberta Pierson Hannum =

American author from West Virginia

- Hannum in 1948
- Born: August 3, 1906; Condit, Ohio
- Died: February 18, 1985 (aged 78); Arlington, Virginia
- Occupation: author

Alberta Leona Pierson Hannum (August 3, 1906 – February 18, 1985) was an author best known for her best-selling novel Roseanna McCoy, a fictionalized account of the Hatfield-McCoy feud, which was turned into a motion picture in 1949 by RKO General.

Hannum lived in Moundsville, West Virginia and wrote fiction, non-fiction and essays. Many of her books showcased life in the Appalachians ranging from West Virginia down to North Carolina in a style Kirkus Reviews called "very mountain-dewy" in 1969. She also wrote short fiction including a story that Maclean's called "one of the most unusual stories we've ever published" about a man who went to heaven in 1944. Her writing did focus on contemporary themes reflected against this rural backdrop; her first novel Thursday April explored "the meaning of the World War to the mountain folk." Her books have been translated into Italian, Korean, Laotian, Russian, and Yugoslavian.

Hannum's short story Turkey Hunt, originally published in Story Magazine, was selected to be in The Best Short Stories of 1938. West Virginia University awarded Hannum an honorary doctorate in 1968 for her writings on the Southern Highlands. The American Library Association listed her novel Look Back With Love as a Notable Book of the Year in 1970. It won a Florence Roberts Head Memorial Award the next year. Hannum was selected as a Daughter of the Year by the West Virginia Society of Washington D. C. in 1972. She was also the first recipient of the West Virginia Writers Inc. JUG Award for Just Uncommonly Good writing in 1983.

== Early life and education ==
Hannum was born in Condit, Ohio to James Ellsworth Pierson and Caroline Adelle Evans. She had an older brother, Leland. She moved to West Virginia in 1929. She received a B.A. from Ohio State University in 1927 and did graduate study at Columbia University in 1928. She married Robert Fulton Hannum, president of Fostoria Glass Company, in January 1928. They had two daughters. She died in 1985 in Arlington, Virginia. Her papers are held by West Virginia University.

== Bibliography ==
- Thursday April (1931)
- The Hills Step Lightly (1934)
- The Gods and One (1941)
- The Mountain People (1943)
- Spin a Silver Dollar: The Story of a Desert Trading Post (1945)
- Roseanna McCoy (1947)
- Paint the Wind (1958)
- Look Back with Love: A Recollection of the Blue Ridge (1969)
