= Coles Mills =

Coles Mills may refer to:

- Coles Mills, New York, one of the first settlements in what is now Putnam County
- Coles Mills, New Jersey, a locality within Union Township, Hunterdon County, New Jersey
- Coles Mills, Ohio, a former post office and ghost town in Delaware County, Ohio
