= Bill Hall (utility player) =

American baseball player (born 1979)

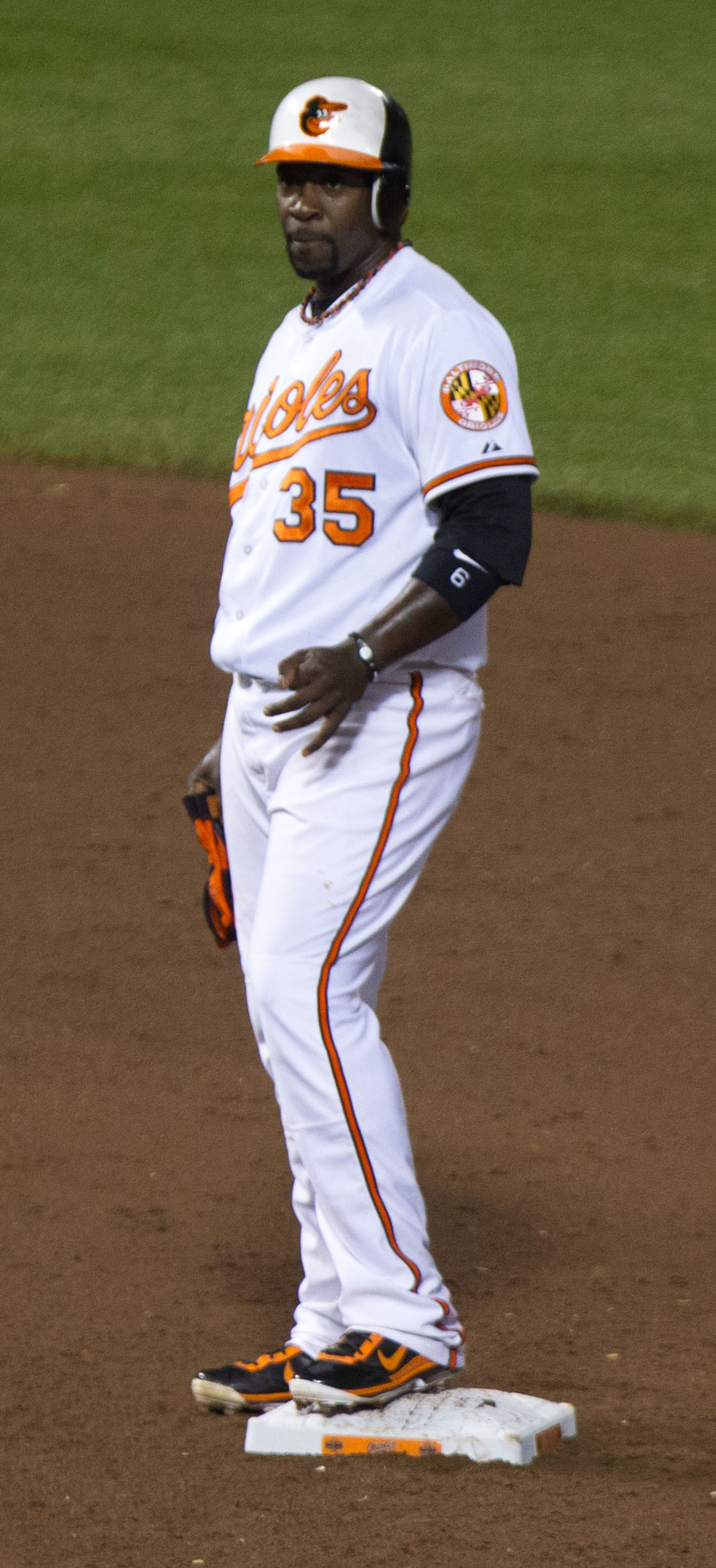
- Hall with the Baltimore Orioles in 2012
- Infielder / Outfielder
- Born: December 28, 1979 (age 46); Tupelo, Mississippi, U.S.
- Batted: Right Threw: Right

MLB debut
- September 1, 2002, for the Milwaukee Brewers

Last MLB appearance
- June 1, 2012, for the Baltimore Orioles

MLB statistics
- Batting average: .248
- Home runs: 125
- Runs batted in: 440
- Stats at Baseball Reference

Teams
- Milwaukee Brewers (2002–2009); Seattle Mariners (2009); Boston Red Sox (2010); Houston Astros (2011); San Francisco Giants (2011); Baltimore Orioles (2012)

Career highlights and awards
- Milwaukee Brewers Wall of Honor

William Leonard Hall (born December 28, 1979) is an American former professional baseball utility player. He played in Major League Baseball for the Milwaukee Brewers, Seattle Mariners, Boston Red Sox, Houston Astros, San Francisco Giants, and Baltimore Orioles from 2002 through 2012.

== Early life ==
Hall attended Nettleton High School in Nettleton, Mississippi.

== Professional career ==
=== Milwaukee Brewers ===
In the 2005 season, Hall helped the Brewers to their first .500 season since 1992. Splitting time among third base, shortstop, and second base, Hall had a batting average of .291 with 17 home runs and 62 RBIs. The following season, Hall played behind newly acquired third baseman Corey Koskie, shortstop J. J. Hardy, and second baseman Rickie Weeks. On May 17, 2006, Hall became the Brewers' starting shortstop after Hardy injured his ankle.

On Mother's Day 2006, with the Brewers playing the New York Mets, Hall hit a walk-off home run in the 10th inning. He hit the home run using a special Mother's Day pink bat with his mother, Vergie Hall, in attendance. After the game he dedicated the home run to her. When the bat was later auctioned to raise money for breast cancer research, Brewers owner Mark Attanasio purchased the bat and gave it to Hall's mother. The final bid on the bat was over $25,000, the third-highest total ever paid for an auction item on mlb.com.

In November 2006, Hall represented Major League Baseball in the Japan All-Star Series.

Hall became the Brewers' leader offensively with a .553 slugging percentage, 85 RBIs, and 35 home runs. He also led his team in runs scored (101), doubles (39), triples (4), total bases (297), and walks (63). As a result of his play, the Brewers named him the most valuable player of the team. On February 5, 2007, Hall signed a four-year deal for $24 million with the Brewers with a $9.25 million option for a fifth season in 2011.

Hall opened the 2007 season as a center fielder, batting fourth. In 2007, he led all major league center fielders in errors with 9, and had the lowest fielding percentage among them, .971, as well as the lowest zone rating, .837.

On June 12, 2007, Hall drew three of the four walks issued by Justin Verlander in his no-hitter against the Brewers.

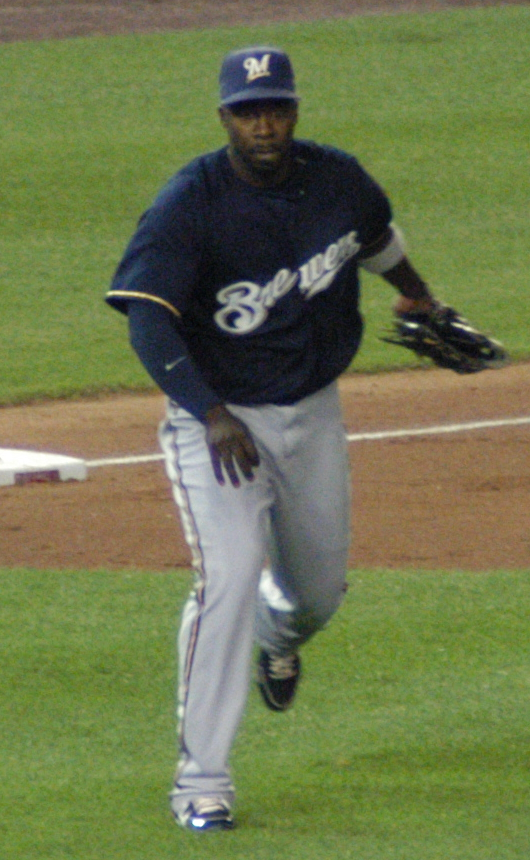
Hall playing for the Milwaukee Brewers in 2008

Hall entered the 2008 season as the Brewers' starting third baseman, following the move of Ryan Braun to left field. In May, the Brewers called up left-hander Russell Branyan from Triple-A to platoon at third base with Hall, after Hall struggled to get hits against right-handed pitchers for much of the early part of the season. Still in the lineup, Hall expressed his disappointment on June 3, 2008, by saying that if he was not going consistently to start for the Brewers, he might want to be traded in order to play every day (he had also grown tired of the Brewers changing his field position, which they had done three seasons in a row—usually something teams avoid so that players remain comfortable in their field positions and perform at their highest potential).

Following his statements, many Brewers fans booed him at Miller Park, which he later admitted affected his confidence. In June and early July he began hitting much better, even against right-handed pitchers (including game-winning, back-to-back, go-ahead home runs against right-handed pitchers of division rival St. Louis Cardinals, in the 10th inning of the first game of the series and in the 9th inning of the second), and all but pushed Branyan back out of the starting lineup. When asked what had changed he said that he felt that he had found his swing in early July, and had subsequently regained his confidence. He thanked his teammates for supporting him through it all.

Hall's hitting then worsened, as he hit .235 in August, and .182 in September–October.

Hall ended the 2008 season with a .225 batting average, and a .174 batting average against right-handers.

On May 25 when the Brewers took on St. Louis in Milwaukee, Hall delivered the game-winning hit while matched up against a right-handed arm in Milwaukee. After the game, Hall declared "I wanna get back to when I was good." Hall subsequently recorded just two hits in his next 22 at-bats.

On July 30, following a win against the Washington Nationals, Hall was sent down to the Triple-A Nashville Sounds. Despite not batting over .180 during May, June, or July, Hall has made some great strides with his swing while seeing batting practice action. Hall said this about being sent down:

"I'm going to go down and get some at-bats, hopefully get a bunch of hits and come back. My swing is good. I just need some reps. My batting practice the last few weeks has been some of the best of my career,"

In his second game with the Sounds, Hall went 2-for-4 with a double and a home run while batting third. Hall was subsequently recalled from Triple-A Nashville and started in right field for the Brewers on August 3, replacing an injured Corey Hart. Hall went 0-for-3 with a bases-loaded walk.

On August 12, Hall was designated for assignment, ending his 7-year stint with the Brewers.

=== Seattle Mariners ===
On August 19, Hall was traded to the Seattle Mariners for minor league pitcher Ruben Flores.

Hall recorded his first hit as a Mariner on what was his first game with his new club on August 21. Hall finished the game with two hits and his first Mariner RBI.

=== Boston Red Sox ===
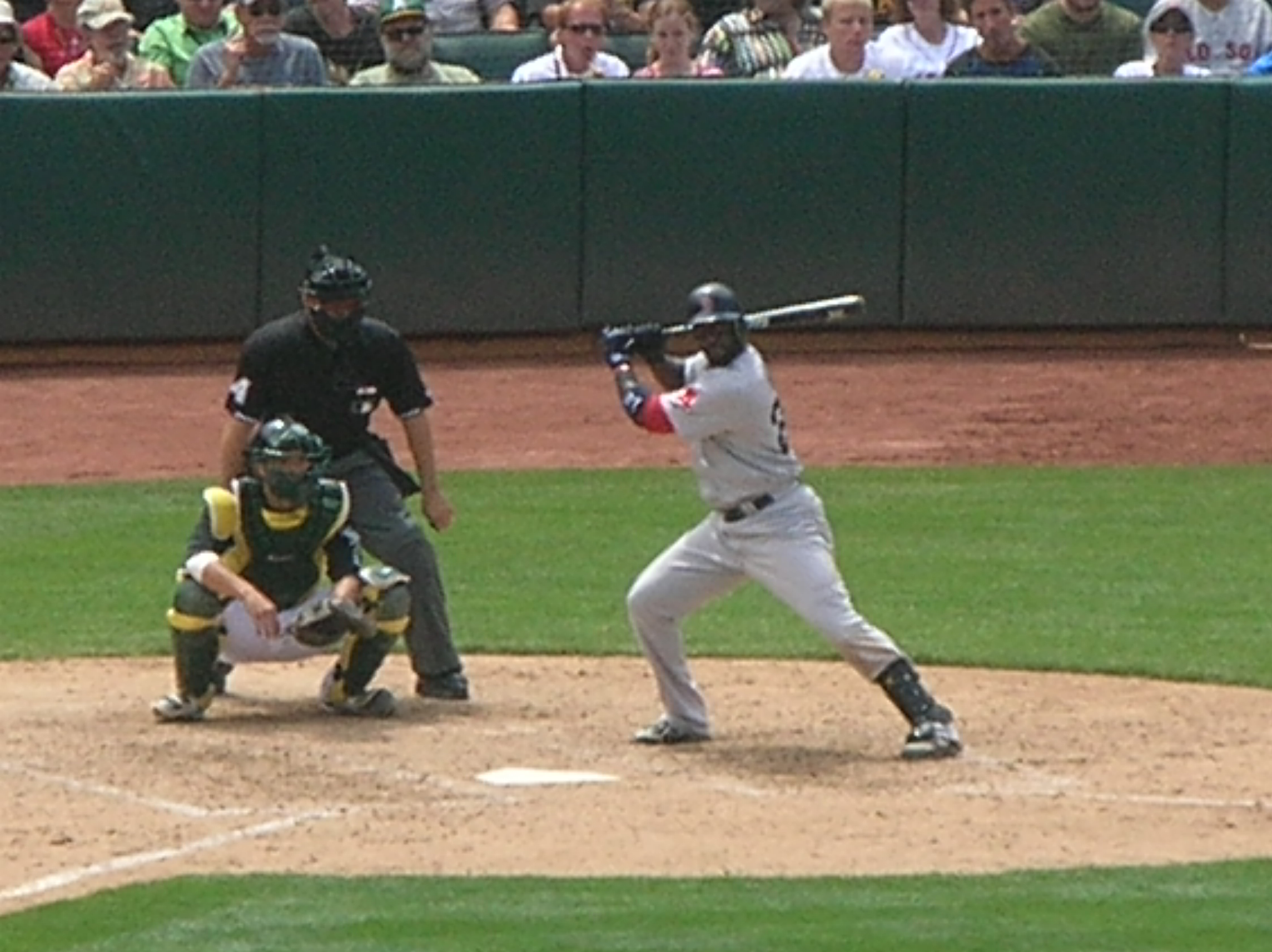
Hall batting for the Boston Red Sox in 2010

On January 7, 2010, Hall was traded to the Boston Red Sox for Casey Kotchman and a minor league player to be named and cash. Hall was excited to return to a utility role, saying "I'm up for anything. I've played every position. I feel I'm athletic enough to move over to first base and hopefully make it look like I've played there for some years. Everybody knows I can play some defense and everyone knows I can hit. I've just had some unfortunate incidents in the last couple of years and I feel like I'm pretty close back to where I used to be. [Manager Terry Francona] just promised me plenty of at-bats and opportunities to prove I could be the player I want to be. That revolves around hitting." Much of the Red Sox roster was plagued by injuries during the 2010 season, forcing manager Francona to constantly juggle the lineups, filling the vacancies with whoever was available. Bill Hall became a "super-utility" option, and played all but two positions during the year. On May 28, 2010, Francona, facing a ninth inning with no available pitchers, sent Bill Hall to the mound. Hall's major league pitching debut was impressive: wielding nothing but an 89 mph fastball, he retired all three batters he faced. Hall finished his year in Boston with 18 home runs, leading the American League in home runs per at-bat in the final two months of the season.

=== Houston Astros ===
On December 20, 2010, Hall signed a one-year contract with the Houston Astros. He was released on June 4, 2011, after hitting .224 for the Astros.

=== San Francisco Giants ===
Hall signed with the San Francisco Giants on June 11, 2011. On July 7, while playing second base, he was spiked in the left leg as Jason Bartlett slid into second base. The resulting cut was so severe, a plastic surgeon had to supervise the stitches administered. Hall was placed on the disabled list after the game. On July 28, 2011, Hall was designated for assignment by the Giants.

=== New York Yankees ===
Hall signed a minor league contract with the New York Yankees on February 7, 2012, with an invitation to spring training. He did not make the team, and opted out of his contract.

=== Baltimore Orioles ===
On April 23, 2012, Hall signed a minor league contract with the Baltimore Orioles. On May 12, 2012, Hall was called up to the majors due to an injury to third baseman Mark Reynolds. Hall hit a home run in his Orioles debut against the Tampa Bay Rays. On May 25, Hall was designated for assignment by the Orioles. He hit 2–7 with a home run and 4 walks. On September 26, Hall's contract was purchased from the Triple-A Norfolk Tides after Randy Wolf was placed on the 60-day Disabled List.

=== Los Angeles Angels of Anaheim ===
On January 30, 2013, Hall signed a minor league contract with the Los Angeles Angels of Anaheim., but on May 19, 2013, was released after batting .164 over 21 games in AAA.

=== Long Island Ducks ===
On June 7, 2013, Hall signed with the Long Island Ducks of the Atlantic League. In 91 games he hit .239/.330/.447 with 16 home runs, 63 RBIs and 2 stolen bases.

On July 18, 2014, Hall re-signed with the Ducks for a second season. In 42 games he hit .239/.363/.355 with 4 home runs, 19 RBIs and 1 stolen base.

=== Retirement ===
On September 5, 2019, Bill Hall signed a one-day contract and retired as a Milwaukee Brewer. "I was just a small town country boy with Major League dreams," said Hall in a news release. "The Brewers gave me an opportunity to live those dreams. The organization and fans welcomed me like family, and that is what we became. Retiring as a Brewer could not feel better or happen any other way."

== Personal life ==
Hall, along with former teammates J. J. Hardy, Jeff Suppan, and Chris Capuano, appeared in an episode of CBS' soap opera The Young and the Restless. He served as a special playoff analyst on ESPN's Cold Pizza

Bill Hall has three kids. Sydni Parker Hall, Maya Parker Hall, and Bella Parker Hall.
