= Dublin Jerome High School =

Location
- 8300 Hyland-Croy Road; Dublin, Ohio, (Union County) 43016; United States; 40°8′3″N 83°10′38″W

Information
- Type: Public, Coeducational high school
- Established: 2004; 22 years ago
- School district: Dublin City Schools
- Superintendent: John Marschhausen
- Principal: Bryan Arnold
- Teaching staff: 95.63 (FTE)
- Grades: 9-12 (Grades 9-11 for the inaugural 2004–2005 school year)
- Student to teacher ratio: 21.70
- Colors: Forest green & Vegas gold
- Athletics conference: Ohio Capital Conference
- Team name: Celtics
- Accreditation: North Central Association of Colleges and Schools
- Website: https://jerome.dublinschools.net/

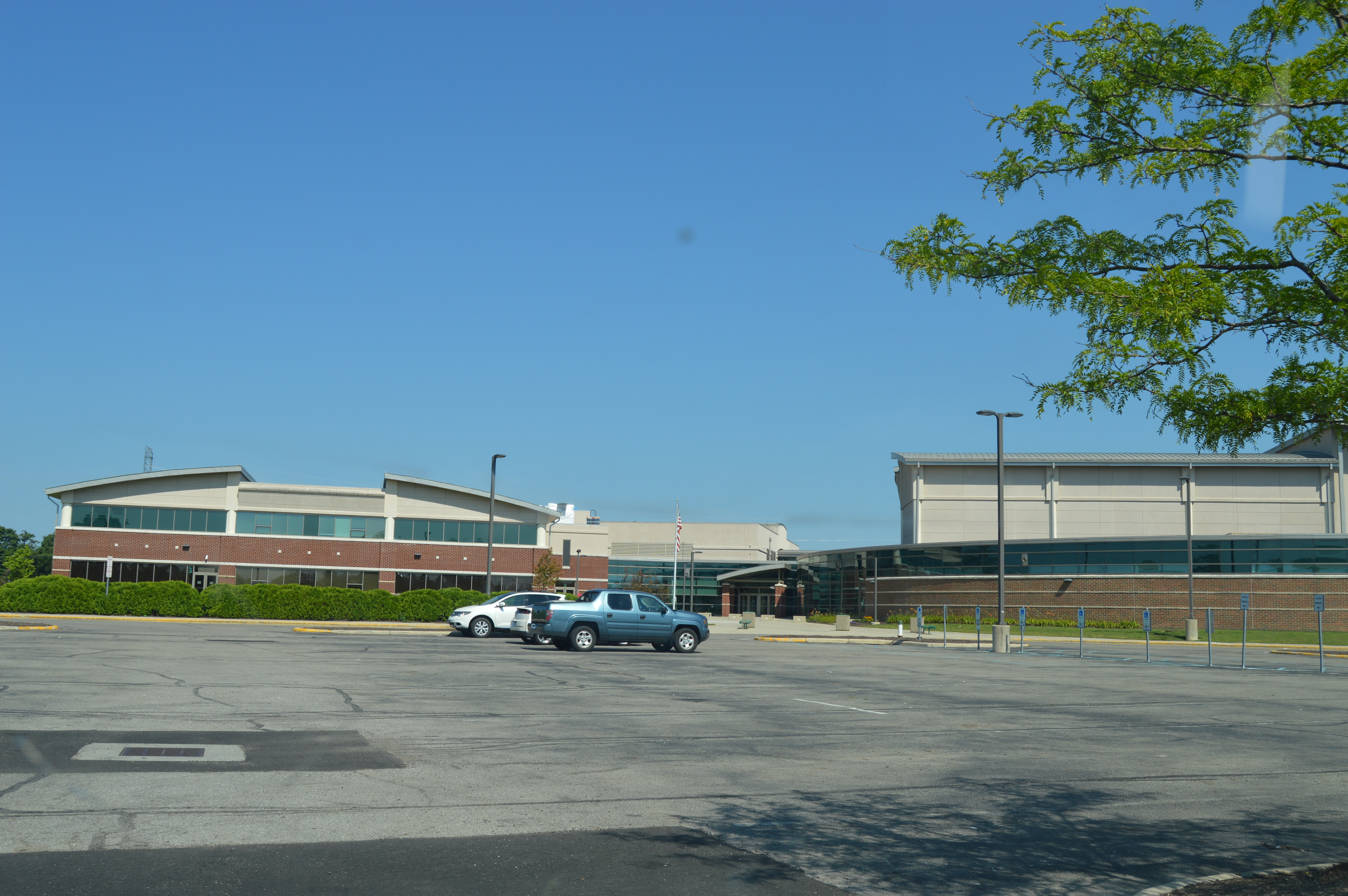
Dublin Jerome High School

Dublin Jerome High School is a public high school located in Dublin, Ohio, northwest of Columbus, Ohio. It is the newest of the three high schools in the Dublin City Schools district. Jerome opened for its first year during the 2004–2005 school year. Though located in the southeast tip of Union County, Dublin Jerome primarily serves students in parts of Franklin County and Delaware County. Jerome's mascot is the Celtic Warrior. Jerome was ranked number 143 in the Newsweek top high school rankings in 2013. In 2010 and 2021, Jerome was honored as a Blue Ribbon School by the US Department of Education.

Dublin Jerome is no longer an IB world school. Students wishing to participate in the IB program must go to Emerald Campus.

In 2024, U.S. News & World Report ranked Dublin Jerome as the #389 best public high school in the United States, and the #12 best public high school in Ohio.

It is also Dublin City Schools first school to open in Union County.

== Attendance boundary ==
In addition to portions of Dublin, the school's boundary covers: Shawnee Hills in Delaware County, as well as the portion of New California census-designated place that is in the Dublin school district.

== Music Programs ==
=== Marching Band ===
The band was formed in 2004 when the school first opened. The Band has received a 'I' Superior rating at the Ohio Music Education Association (OMEA) state finals for its entire existence (2004–Present). They have received this score at the Buckeye Invitational, hosted by the Ohio State University's marching band, in 2011, 2013, 2016, and 2018. Their highest score in OMEA competition is currently 281.45 scored during the 2019 season at Thomas Worthington High School. Their second highest score, earned in 2018, was a 280.05. Their third highest score, earned in 2017, was a 279.5.

=== Orchestra ===
The Dublin Jerome Orchestra plays a combination of both classical and more modern music. It is conducted by Michelle Adair and has three concerts per year. The last concert of the year is the Concerto Concert in which three soloists perform, accompanied by a full orchestra. Pieces performed in the past have included Faure Elegie cello concerto, Bruch Violin Concerto, Sergei Rachmaninoff's 2nd Piano Concerto, Tchaikovsky's 1st Piano Concerto, and other well-known works.

=== Choir ===
The Dublin Jerome Choir as a whole performs once at the yearly Holiday Showcase with the rest of the music department, and once again in the springtime for an original concert. Each time the choirs have gone to competitions (most notably, OMEA contests), they have received a "I" (superior) rating. The two higher choirs at Jerome, the chamber group A Capella and the all-girl group Chorale, were invited to perform in New York's Carnegie Hall in April 2010.

== Theatre ==
Dublin Jerome has had a Drama Club and a Theatre 3 Acting Ensemble since it first opened.

=== Seasons ===
2015-2016 Season: And Then There None, Cinderella, Student Directed One Acts, Sweeney Todd, Mystery at the Frisky Kitten

2016-2017 Season: A Flea In Her Ear, Charlotte's Web, Student Directed One Acts, Guys and Dolls, A Failure of Love Story

2017-2018 Season: The Octette Bridge Club, The Little Mermaid, Student Directed One Acts, Fame, Museum

2018-2019 Season: Almost Maine, Aladdin Jr., Student Directed One Acts, Into The Woods, A Little Overboard

2020-2021 Season: Letters to Sala, Lion King Jr., Student Directed One Acts, Addams Family, Frogs

2022-2023 Season: One Stoplight Town, Flat Stanley Jr., Student Directed One Acts, Shrek Jr., Peter and the Starcatcher

2023-2024 season: Draulca, Chitty Chitty Bang Bang, Jr, The Sound of Music, and Murder on the Orient Express.

2024-2025 season Fahrenheit 451, James and the Giant Peach, J Little Shop of Horrors, Shakespeare in Love

Awards

In 2019, Jerome's Production of Into the Woods brought in 13 nominations from the CAPA Marquee Awards. Three students took home awards. Maeve Gallagher won Best Leading Actress in a Musical. Grace Mayo and Caitlin O'Brien tied for the Outstanding Technical Achievement Award.

== Athletics ==
Dublin Jerome is an Ohio High School Athletic Association (OHSAA) Division I and Division II athletic high school. There are multiple sports teams for both men and women

- football
- soccer
- cross country
- field hockey
- volleyball
- wrestling
- Basketball
- swimming,
- hockey,
- track,
- tennis,
- baseball,
- softball,
- golf
- lacrosse

== Ohio High School Athletic Association State Championships ==
- Boys' Lacrosse - 2005, 2010, 2011 (unofficial) 2021, 2023 (official)
- Girls' Golf - 2005, 2011, 2012, 2013, 2014, 2015, 2023, 2025
- Boys' Golf - 2004, 2005, 2007, 2011, 2012, 2013, 2017, 2018, 2019, 2025, 2026
- Girls' Swimming - 2023
- Boys' Soccer - 2025

== Notable alumni ==
- Lindsay Agnew, former professional soccer player
- Cole Cassels, professional hockey player, drafted third round by the Vancouver Canucks
- Joe Huber, professional football player for the Minnesota Vikings
- J.C. Mack, professional soccer player
- Connor Murphy, professional hockey player for the Edmonton Oilers, first round draft pick by the Phoenix Coyotes
- Emma Sears, professional soccer payer for Racing Louisville FC
- Konrad Warzycha, former professional soccer player
- Chris Wood, actor

== See also ==
- Dublin City School District
