= Arnold, Ohio =

- Unincorporated community
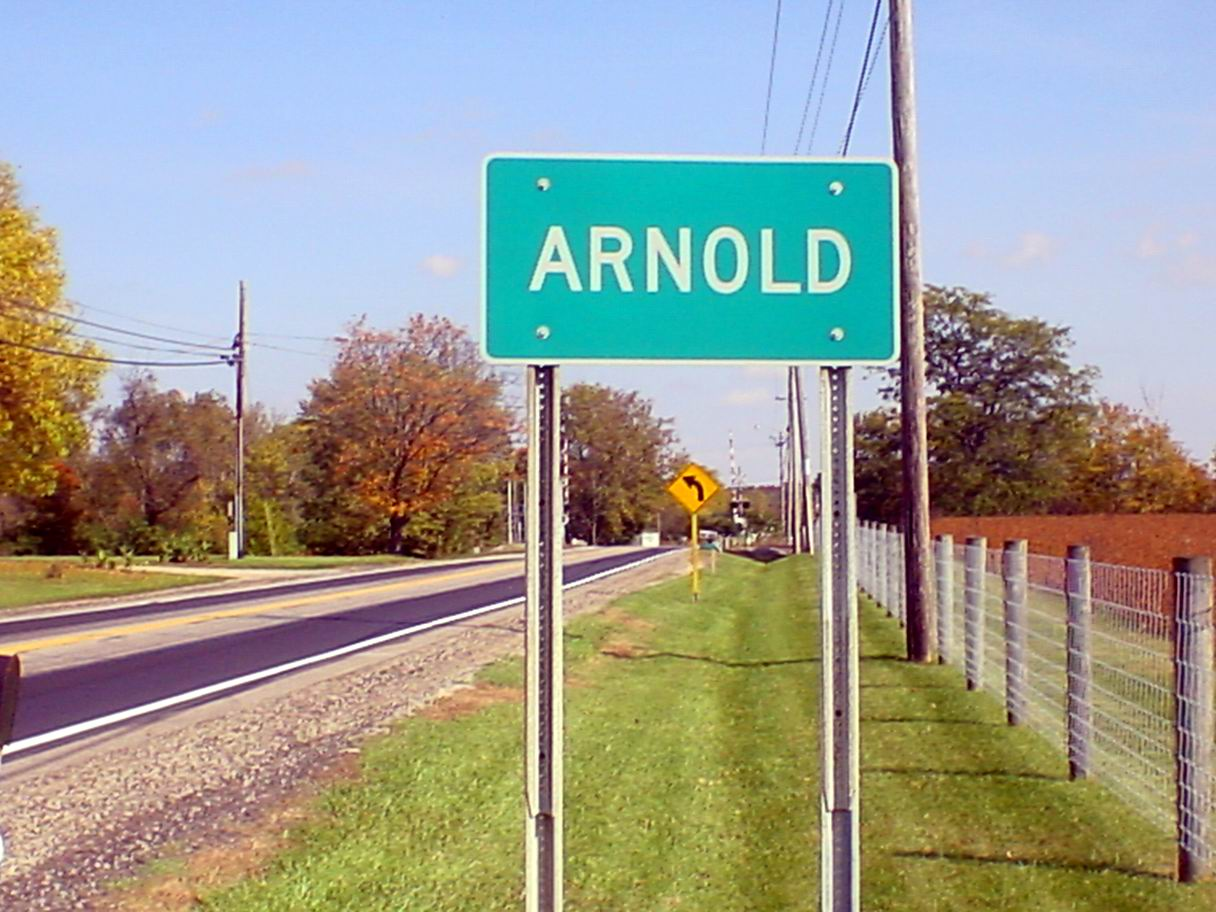

- Location within Ohio
- Coordinates: 40°08′30″N 83°14′59″W
- Country: United States
- State: Ohio
- Counties: Union
- Elevation: 958 ft (292 m)
- Time zone: UTC-5 (Eastern (EST))
  - Summer (DST): UTC-4 (EDT)
- ZIP code: 43064
- Area code: 614
- GNIS feature ID: 1037487

Arnold is an unincorporated community in Jerome Township, Union County, Ohio, United States. It is located along U.S. Route 42, between New California and Plain City.

== History ==
In 1893, a railroad station was built and a community platted on land owned by Mrs. George Arnold along the Toledo and Ohio Central Railroad. The station was originally called New California, but the name was changed when they applied for a post office. The Arnold Post office was established on June 21, 1894, with James Arnold as the original Postmaster. Arnold closed his grocery store, and the post office was abandoned in 1896. Fred Smith was then commissioned as Postmaster, but closed his business also before he could perform any of the duties of the office. Mrs. Carrie Fleck was the next Postmaster, when she and her husband established a store in the community later in 1896. She continued her duties until the branch was discontinued on February 28, 1910. As of 1913, Mr. & Mrs. Fleck's store had continued to grow, and there was also another grocery store, an axe handle factory, two warehouses, the railroad station, 24 houses, and a population of about 100.
