= Jerome, Ohio =

- Unincorporated community
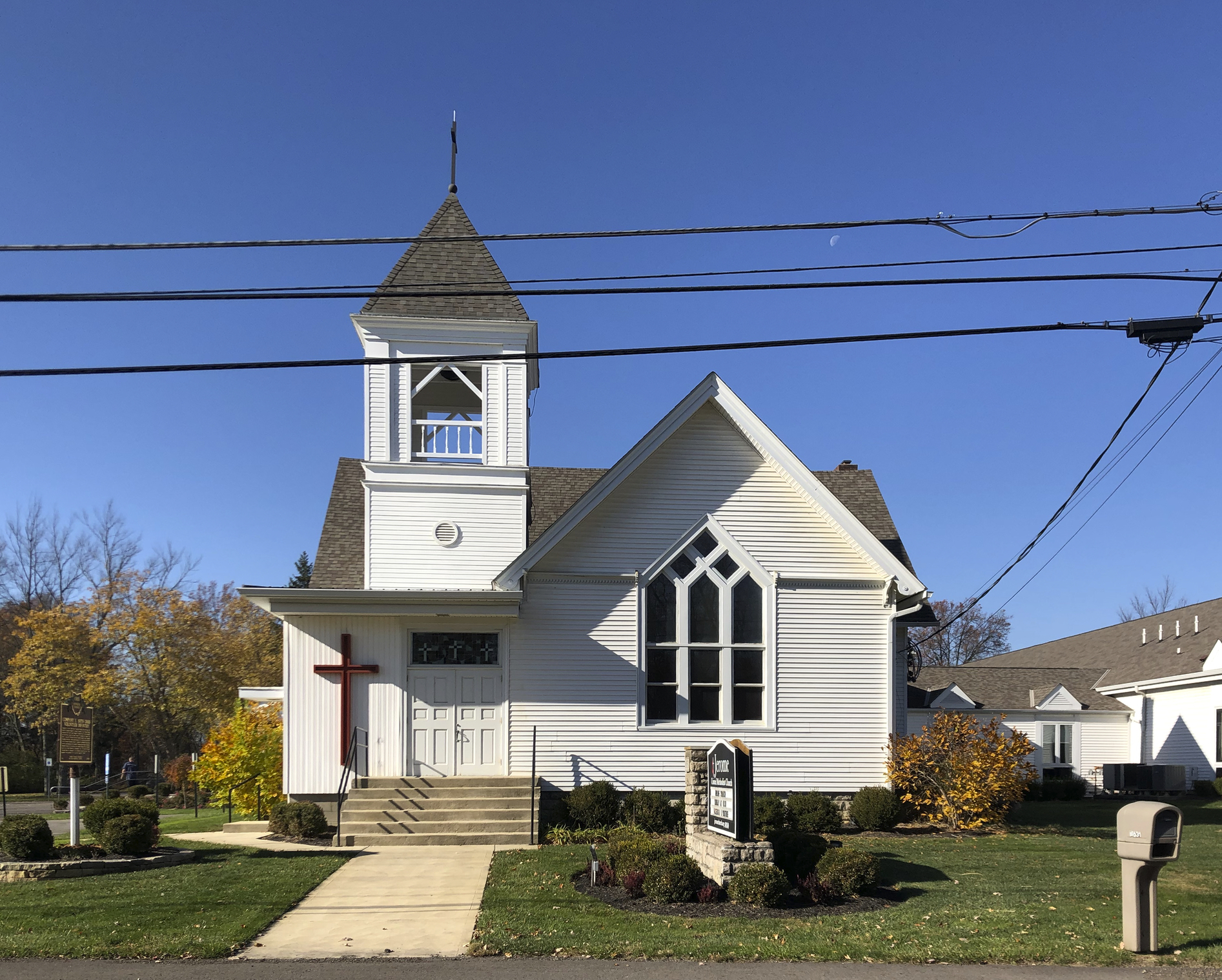
- Jerome United Methodist Church is a historical site in Ohio

- Location within Ohio
- Coordinates: 40°09′59″N 83°10′33″W
- Country: United States
- State: Ohio
- Counties: Union
- Elevation: 978 ft (298 m)
- Time zone: UTC-5 (Eastern (EST))
  - Summer (DST): UTC-4 (EDT)
- ZIP code: 43064
- Area code: 614
- GNIS feature ID: 1064909

Jerome is an unincorporated community in Jerome Township, Union County, Ohio, United States. It is located at the intersection of Jerome Road (Union County Road 11) and Scioto Road (Union County Road 13), about 2 miles east of New California.

A former variant name of Jerome was Frankfort. Frankfort was laid out and platted in 1846. A post office called Jerome was established on April 17, 1848, but was discontinued on December 15, 1905. The mail service is now sent through the Plain City branch.
