= William K. Willis / Scioto River High School =

William K. Willis High School Scioto River High School
- Scioto Juvenile Correctional Facility

Location
- 5993 Home Road; Delaware, (Delaware County), Ohio 43015; United States
- Coordinates: 40°11′28″N 83°8′22″W

Information
- School district: Buckeye United Schools
- Authority: Ohio Department of Youth Services
- Superintendent: Maryalice Turner
- Principal: Joseph Becker
- Grades: 9–12
- Website: Correctional Facility Website

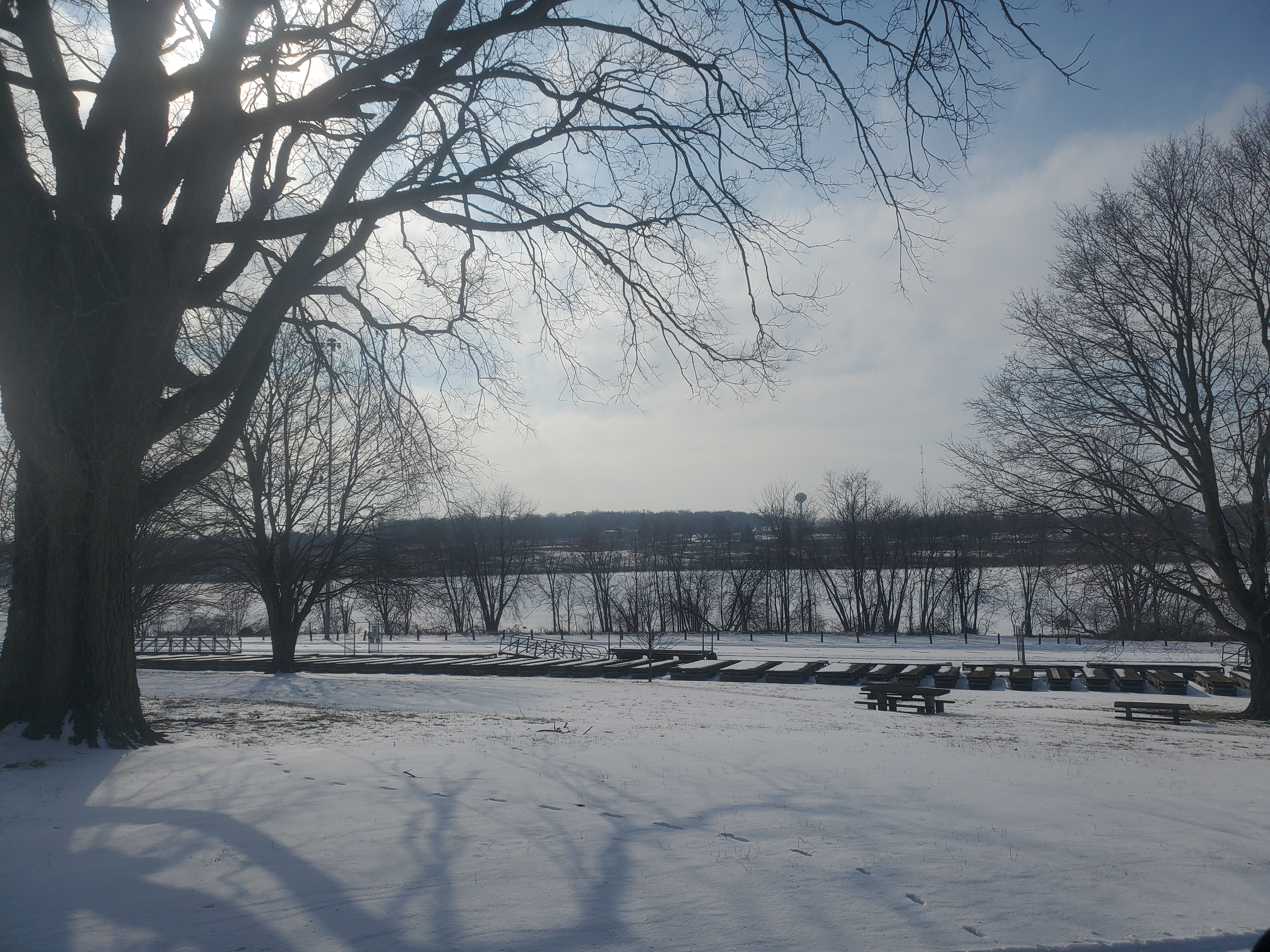
William K. Willis - Scioto River High School.jpg

William K. Willis / Scioto River High School was a high school in Delaware, Ohio. It's a part of the Scioto Juvenile Correctional Facility. All youth prisoners who do not have a high school degree are required to participate in the educational program.

William K. Willis High School is for female youth prisoners, while Scioto River High School is for the male youth prisoners.
