= Cones Mills, Ohio =

Ghost town in Ohio, United States

Coordinates: 40°21′43″N 83°11′7″W

Cones Mills is a ghost town in Delaware County, in the U.S. state of Ohio. It was located in Thompson Township.

== History ==
Later named Pickrell's Mill, Cones Mills was once a prosperous location, but the burning of Cone's woolen mill and the closure of other local industries, due to lack of business, ruined its hopes. The community lay along the old military road approximately one mile north of Delsaver's Ford on the Scioto River, the spot at which the township's southern boundary meets the river. An earlier community, Patterson, lay on the same road a short distance to the north, at the mouth of Fulton Creek, but it was eclipsed by Cones Mills, and its post office closed when one was opened in the newer community. Operating in a local store, the Cones Mills post office endured into the 1880s.
