= Leonardsburg, Ohio =

Unincorporated community in Ohio, U.S.

Coordinates: 40°21′28″N 82°59′20″W

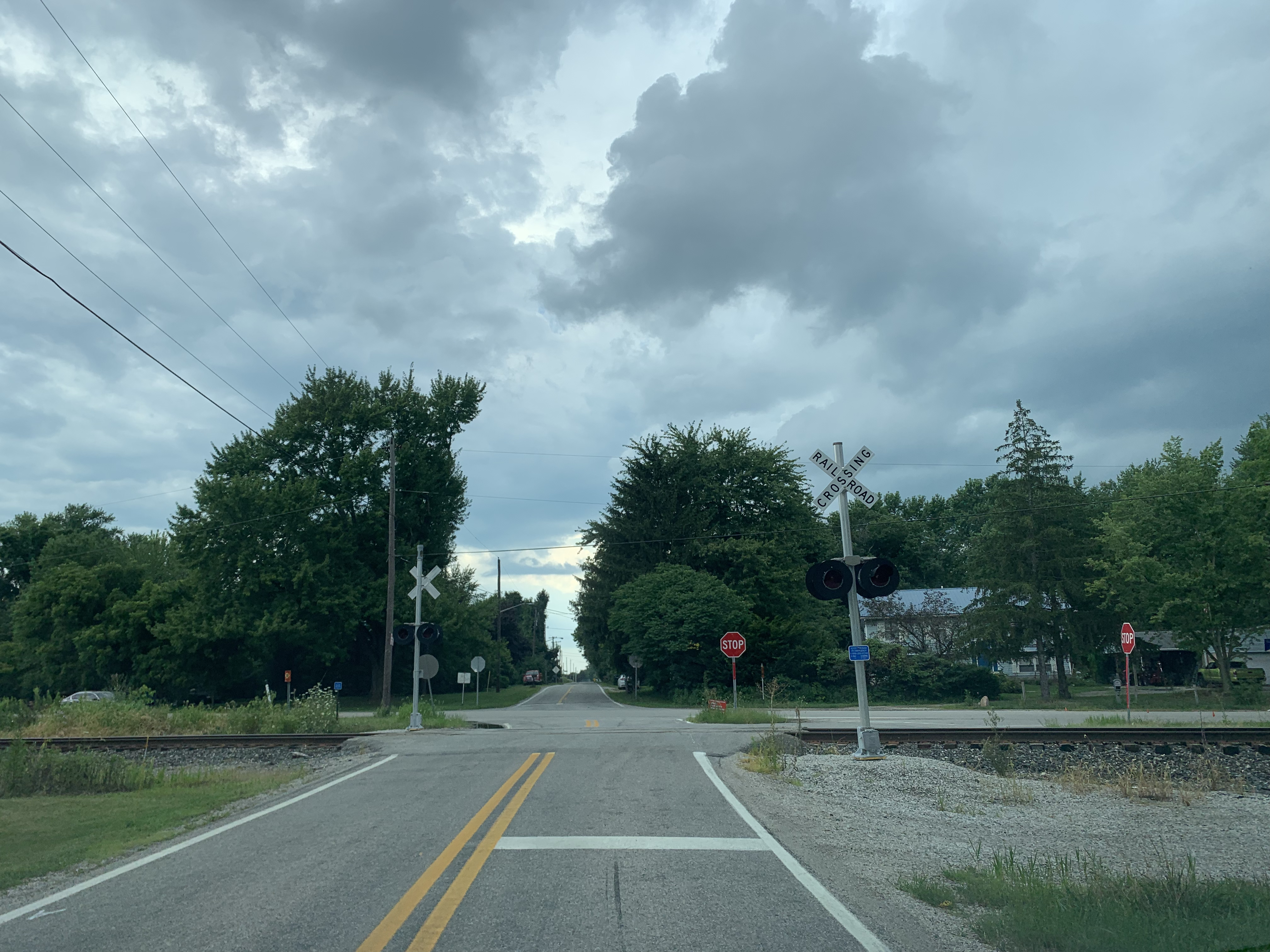
Leonoardsburg, Ohio in the summer of 2025, facing west.

Leonardsburg is an unincorporated community in Delaware County, in the U.S. state of Ohio.

== History ==
Leonardsburg was laid out in 1852, and named for A. Leonard, the town's first storekeeper. A post office called Leonardsburgh was established in 1852, the name was changed to Leonardsburg in 1893, and the post office closed in 1972.
