= Shawnee Hills, Delaware County, Ohio =

Shawnee Hills, Ohio
- Village
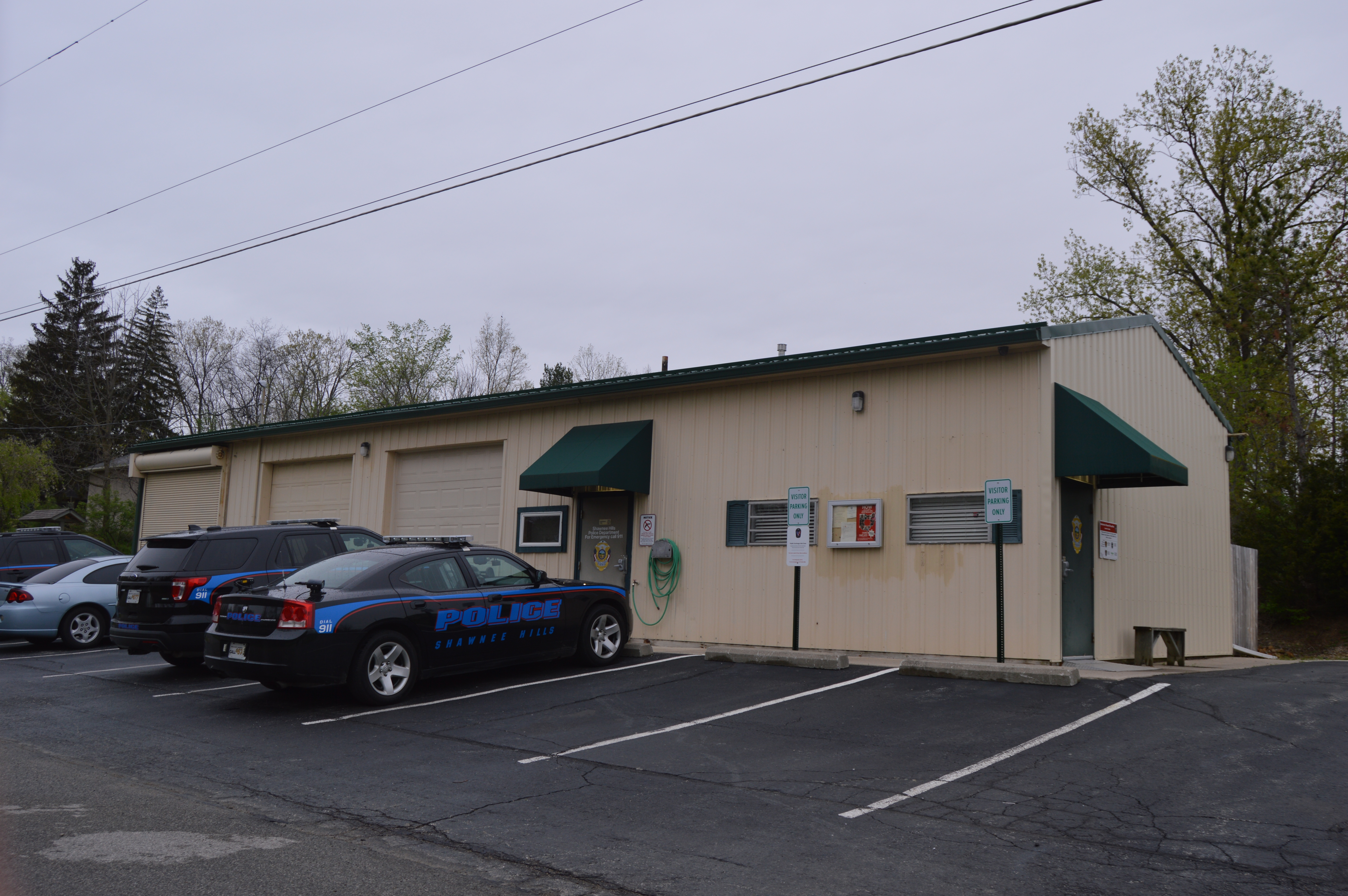
- Village Hall

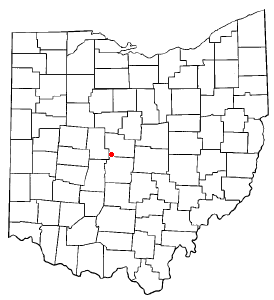
- Location of Shawnee Hills, Delaware County, Ohio

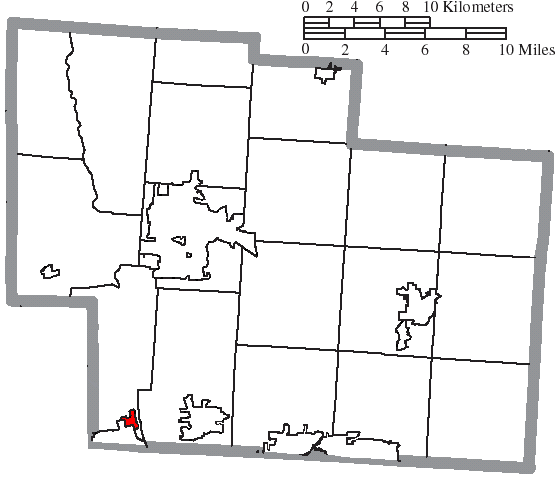
- Location of Shawnee Hills in Delaware County
- Coordinates: 40°09′36″N 83°08′08″W
- Country: United States
- State: Ohio
- County: Delaware
- Township: Concord

Area
  - Total: 0.44 sq mi (1.15 km^{2})
  - Land: 0.44 sq mi (1.15 km^{2})
  - Water: 0 sq mi (0.00 km^{2})
- Elevation: 896 ft (273 m)

Population (2020)
  - Total: 835
  - Density: 1,877.9/sq mi (725.06/km^{2})
- Time zone: UTC-5 (Eastern (EST))
  - Summer (DST): UTC-4 (EDT)
- ZIP code: 43065
- Area code: 614
- FIPS code: 39-71976
- GNIS feature ID: 2399793
- Website: www.shawneehillsoh.org

Shawnee Hills is a village in Delaware County, Ohio, United States. The population was 835 at the 2020 census. It is a part of the Columbus, Ohio Metropolitan Statistical Area.

== Geography ==
According to the United States Census Bureau, the village has a total area of 0.44 square miles (1.14 km^{2}), all land.

== Demographics ==
Historical population
Census	Pop.	Note	%±
1950	338		—
1960	394		16.6%
1970	428		8.6%
1980	430		0.5%
1990	423		−1.6%
2000	419		−0.9%
2010	681		62.5%
2020	835		22.6%
U.S. Decennial Census

=== 2010 census ===
As of the census of 2010, there were 681 people, 268 households, and 188 families living in the village. The population density was 1,547.7 inhabitants per square mile (597.6/km^{2}). There were 295 housing units at an average density of 670.5 per square mile (258.9/km^{2}). The racial makeup of the village was 92.5% White, 0.1% Native American, 3.2% Asian, 0.3% from other races, 2.5% African American, and 1.3% from two or more races. Hispanic or Latino of any race were 1.9% of the population.

There were 268 households, of which 34.0% had children under the age of 18 living with them, 57.8% were married couples living together, 6.0% had a female householder with no husband present, 6.3% had a male householder with no wife present, and 29.9% were non-families. 22.4% of all households were made up of individuals, and 6.3% had someone living alone who was 65 years of age or older. The average household size was 2.54 and the average family size was 2.97.

The median age in the village was 40.6 years. 24.1% of residents were under the age of 18; 4.6% were between the ages of 18 and 24; 28.4% were from 25 to 44; 33.6% were from 45 to 64; and 9.1% were 65 years of age or older. The gender makeup of the village was 52.1% male and 47.9% female.

=== 2000 census ===
As of the census of 2000, there were 419 people, 181 households, and 116 families living in the village. The population density was 1,081.3 inhabitants per square mile (417.5/km^{2}). There were 199 housing units at an average density of 513.5 per square mile (198.3/km^{2}). The racial makeup of the village was 95.23% White, 2.15% African American, 1.43% Asian, and 1.19% from two or more races. Hispanic or Latino of any race were 1.91% of the population.

There were 181 households, out of which 26.0% had children under the age of 18 living with them, 52.5% were married couples living together, 7.2% had a female householder with no husband present, and 35.4% were non-families. 24.3% of all households were made up of individuals, and 6.1% had someone living alone who was 65 years of age or older. The average household size was 2.31 and the average family size was 2.73.

In the village, the population was spread out, with 21.5% under the age of 18, 4.5% from 18 to 24, 34.8% from 25 to 44, 28.2% from 45 to 64, and 11.0% who were 65 years of age or older. The median age was 40 years. For every 100 females there were 91.3 males. For every 100 females age 18 and over, there were 95.8 males.

The median income for a household in the village was $52,222, and the median income for a family was $70,179. Males had a median income of $51,250 versus $32,059 for females. The per capita income for the village was $25,266. About 5.4% of families and 7.8% of the population were below the poverty line, including 12.3% of those under age 18 and 5.7% of those age 65 or over.

== Education ==
The CDP is in the Dublin City School District.

The zoned schools are: Pinney Elementary School, Eversole Run Middle School, and Dublin Jerome High School.
