= Orange, Delaware County, Ohio =

Unincorporated community in Ohio, U.S.

Coordinates: 40°10′28″N 83°0′30″W

Orange is an unincorporated community in Delaware County, in the U.S. state of Ohio.

== History ==
Variant names of Orange were Goodingdale, Orange Station, and Williamsville.

Orange Station was platted in 1852. A post office called Williamsville was established in 1838, the name was changed to Orange Station in 1860, and the post office closed in 1879. A post office called Goodingdale operated from 1898 until 1904.
