= Stratford, Ohio =

Unincorporated community in Ohio, U.S.

Coordinates: 40°15′22″N 83°3′48″W

Stratford is an unincorporated community in Delaware County, in the U.S. state of Ohio.

== History ==
Stratford was platted in 1850. However, Stratford appears to have already been platted in 1849. A map of Delaware County at the Library of Congress shows Stratford platted then. The community derives its name from Stratford-upon-Avon, England. A post office was established at Stratford in 1850, and remained in operation until 1900.
