= Nettleton High School =

Nettleton High School may refer to:

- Nettleton High School (Arkansas), Nettleton, Arkansas
- Nettleton High School, Nettleton, Mississippi; in the Nettleton School District
