= Hyatts, Ohio =

Unincorporated community in Ohio, U.S.

Coordinates: 40°12′58″N 83°5′7″W

Hyatts is an unincorporated community in Delaware County, in the U.S. state of Ohio.

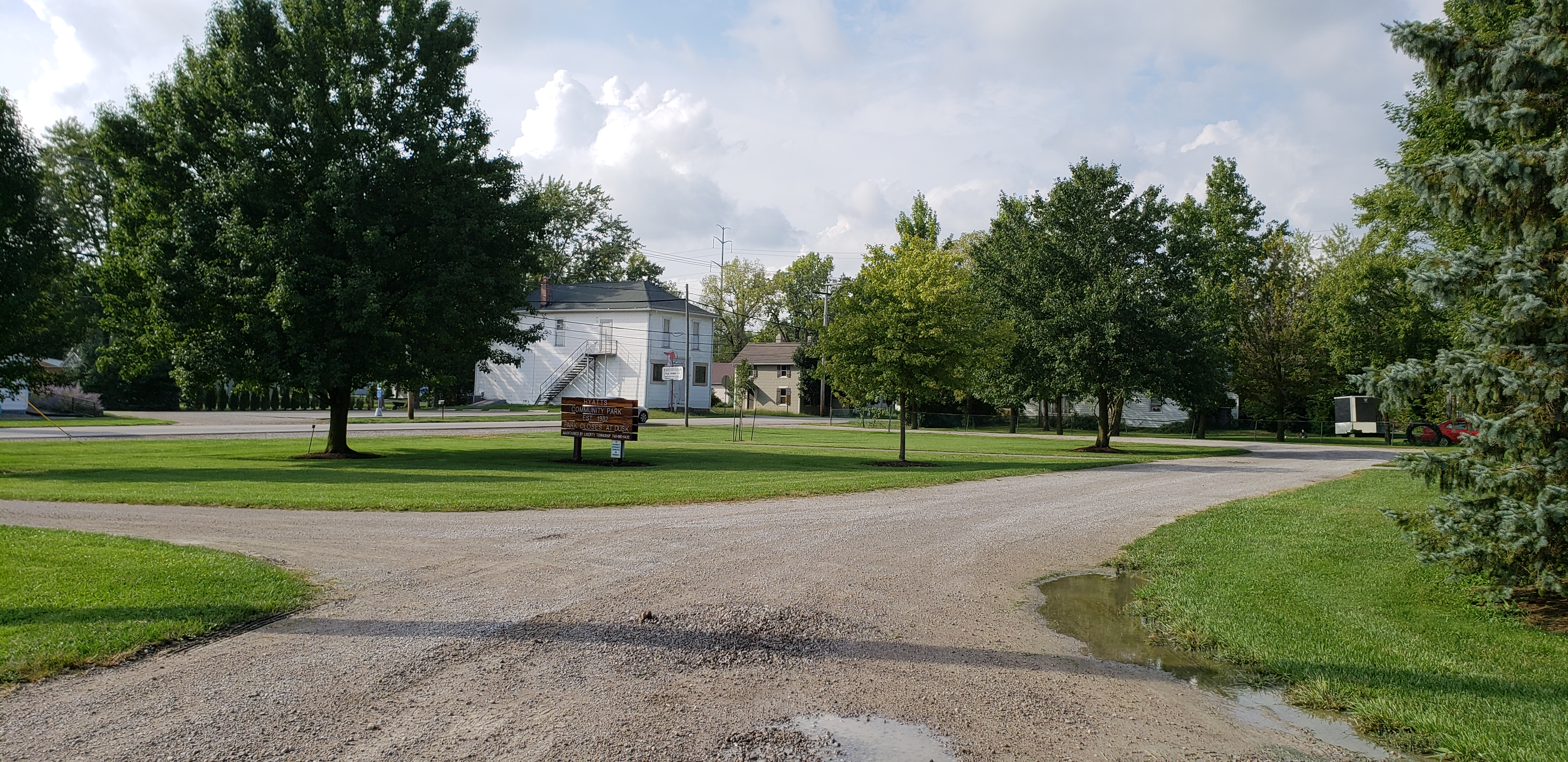
Hyatts Community Park in Hyatts

== History ==
The community was platted in 1876 by Henry A. Hyatt, and named for him. Former variant names include Hyatt's, Hyatts Station, Hyattsville, Hyattville, Hyatville, and Hytts. A post office called Hyattville was established in 1877, and remained in operation until 1908.
