= White Sulphur, Ohio =

Unincorporated community in Ohio, U.S.

Coordinates: 40°16′38″N 83°9′26″W

White Sulphur is an unincorporated community in Delaware County, in the U.S. state of Ohio.

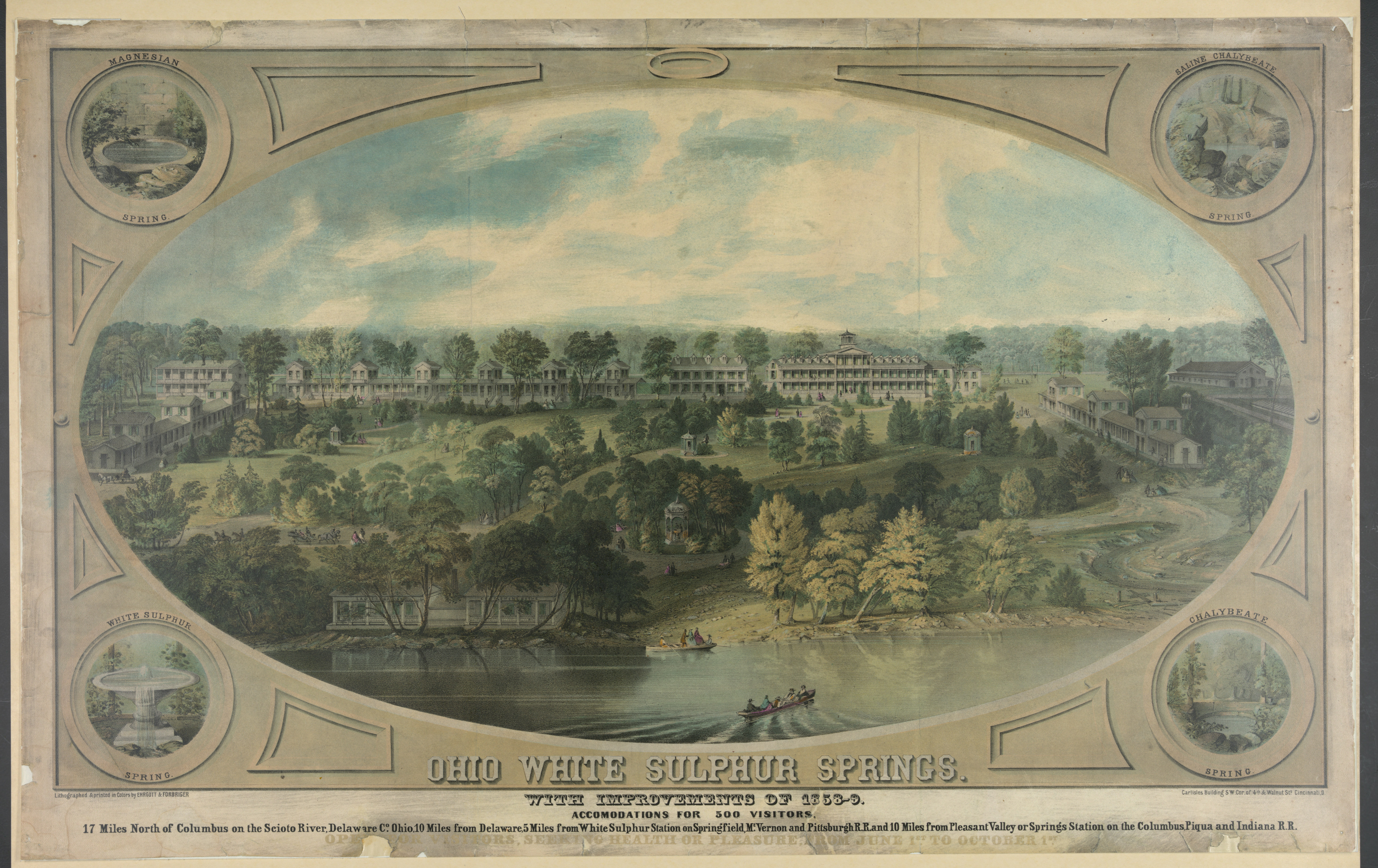
White Sulphur Springs in the 1860s

== History ==
A post office called White Sulphur was established in 1858, and remained in operation until 1918. The community was named for a sulphur spring near the original town site. Besides the post office, White Sulphur had a passenger railroad depot.
