= Rome, Delaware County, Ohio =

Unincorporated community in Ohio, U.S.

Coordinates: 40°14′48″N 82°54′38″W

Rome is an unincorporated community in Delaware County, in the U.S. state of Ohio.

== History ==
Rome was laid out in 1836. The community was named after the Italian city of Rome, the founder being interested in Ancient Roman history. Rome was incorporated in 1838; the village incorporation was later dissolved at an unknown date.
