= Alum Creek, Ohio =

Unincorporated community in Ohio, U.S.

Coordinates: 40°16′1″N 82°56′40″W

Alum Creek is an unincorporated community in Delaware County, in the U.S. state of Ohio.

== History ==
A post office called Alum Creek was established in 1838, and remained in operation until 1899. The community takes its name from nearby Alum Creek.
