= Edinburgh, Ohio =

Coordinates: 40°16′39″N 83°12′53″W

Edinburgh (also spelled Edinburg) is a ghost town in Delaware County, in the U.S. state of Ohio. It was located in Scioto Township, but the precise location of the extinct town is unknown to the GNIS.

== History ==
Edinburg(h) was originally called Fairview, and under the latter name was settled around 1815. The town at first grew rapidly, but with construction of the railroad, business activity shifted to nearby Ostrander, and the town's population dwindled.
