= Cheshire, Delaware County, Ohio =

Unincorporated community in Ohio, U.S.

Coordinates: 40°14′18″N 82°57′40″W

Cheshire is an unincorporated community in Delaware County, in the U.S. state of Ohio.

== History ==
The first store opened at Cheshire in 1847. The town site was platted in 1849. The post office at Cheshire was called Constantia. This post office was established in 1851, and remained in operation until 1904.
