= Vans Valley, Ohio =

Unincorporated community in Ohio, U.S.

Coordinates: 40°13′4″N 82°48′10″W

Vans Valley is an unincorporated community in Delaware County, in the U.S. state of Ohio.

== History ==
A post office called Vans Valley was established in 1849, and remained in operation until 1899. The community was named for Gilbert Van Dorn, a pioneer settler.
