= Harlem, Ohio =

Unincorporated community in Ohio, US

Coordinates: 40°9′8″N 82°50′24″W

Harlem is an unincorporated community in Harlem Township, Delaware County, in the U.S. state of Ohio.

== History ==
Harlem was platted in 1849 and named for its location within Harlem Township. A post office was established at Harlem in 1830, and remained in operation until 1907.
