= Nettleton School District =

Nettleton School District may refer to:

- Nettleton School District (Arkansas), based in Nettleton, Arkansas.
- Nettleton School District (Mississippi), based in Nettleton, Mississippi.
