= East Liberty, Delaware County, Ohio =

Unincorporated community in Ohio, U.S.

Coordinates: 40°19′36″N 82°49′2″W

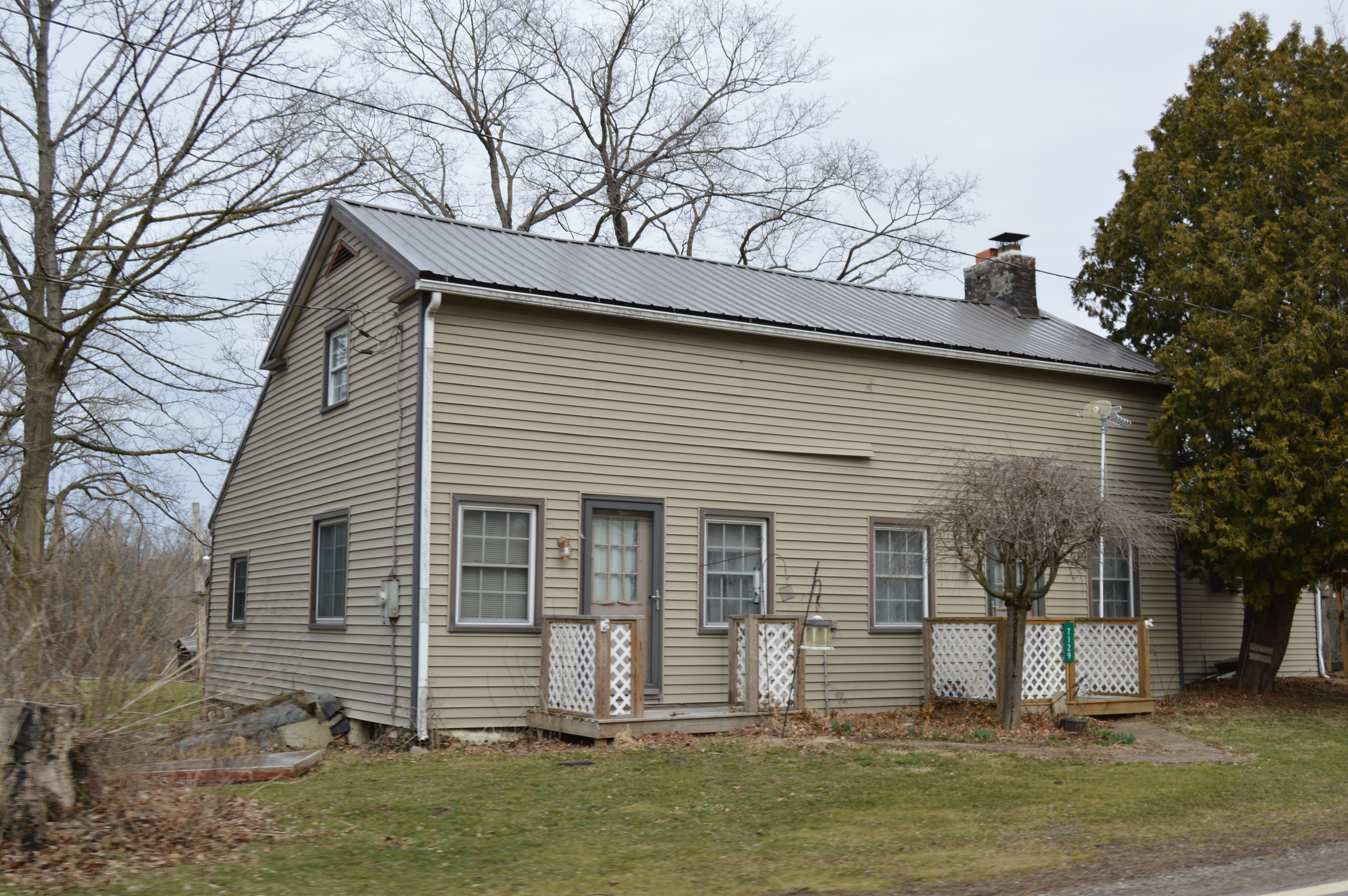
Saltbox house on State Route 656

East Liberty is an unincorporated community in Delaware County, in the U.S. state of Ohio.

== History ==
East Liberty was laid out in 1840, but the town site's inland location away from railroads hampered its growth.
