= Norton, Delaware County, Ohio =

Unincorporated community in Ohio, U.S.

Coordinates: 40°26′3″N 83°4′30″W

Norton is an unincorporated community in Delaware County, in the U.S. state of Ohio.

== History ==
Norton was laid out before 1810 by Colonel James Kilbourne. During the war of 1812, a blockhouse was constructed to provide shelter and place to take arms. A post office called Norton was established in 1816, and remained in operation until 1912.
