= Jerome Township, Union County, Ohio =

Township in Ohio, US

- Township
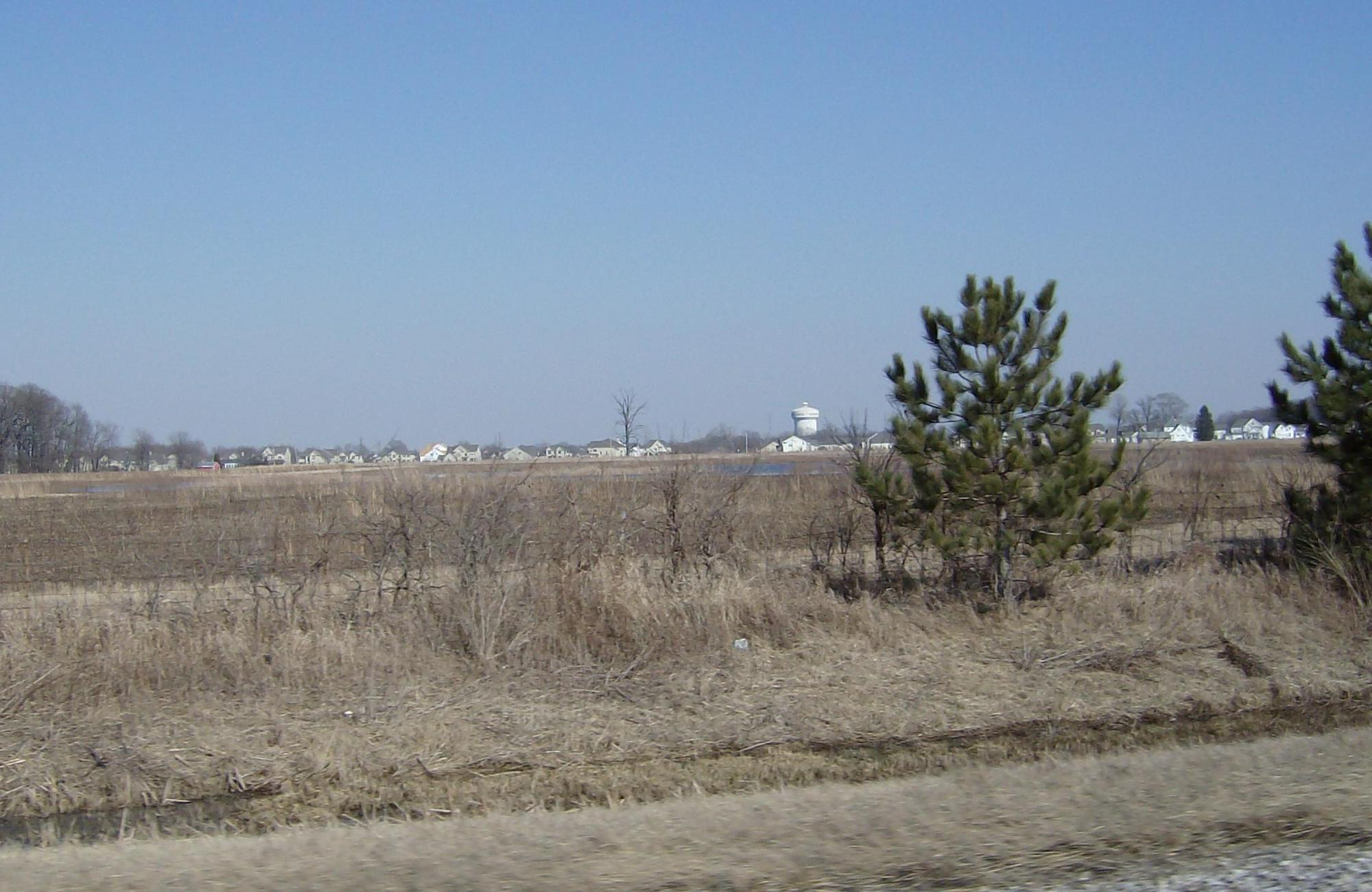
- Fields in Jerome Township

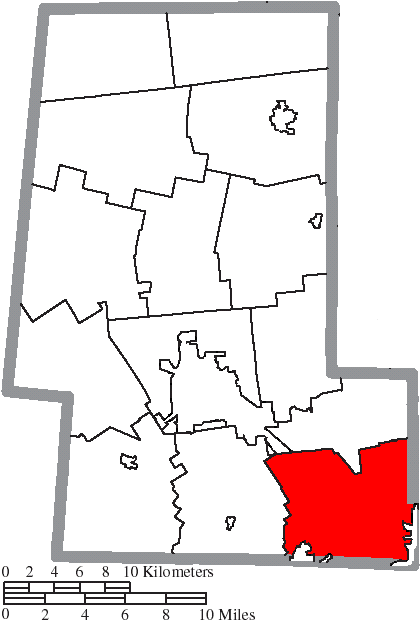
- Location of Jerome Township in Union County
- Coordinates: 40°8′33″N 83°13′53″W
- Country: United States
- State: Ohio
- County: Union

Area
  - Total: 36.4 sq mi (94.2 km^{2})
  - Land: 36.3 sq mi (94.1 km^{2})
  - Water: 0 sq mi (0.0 km^{2})
- Elevation: 942 ft (287 m)

Population (2020)
  - Total: 9,504
  - Density: 260/sq mi (101/km^{2})
- Time zone: UTC-5 (Eastern (EST))
  - Summer (DST): UTC-4 (EDT)
- FIPS code: 39-39046
- GNIS feature ID: 1087078

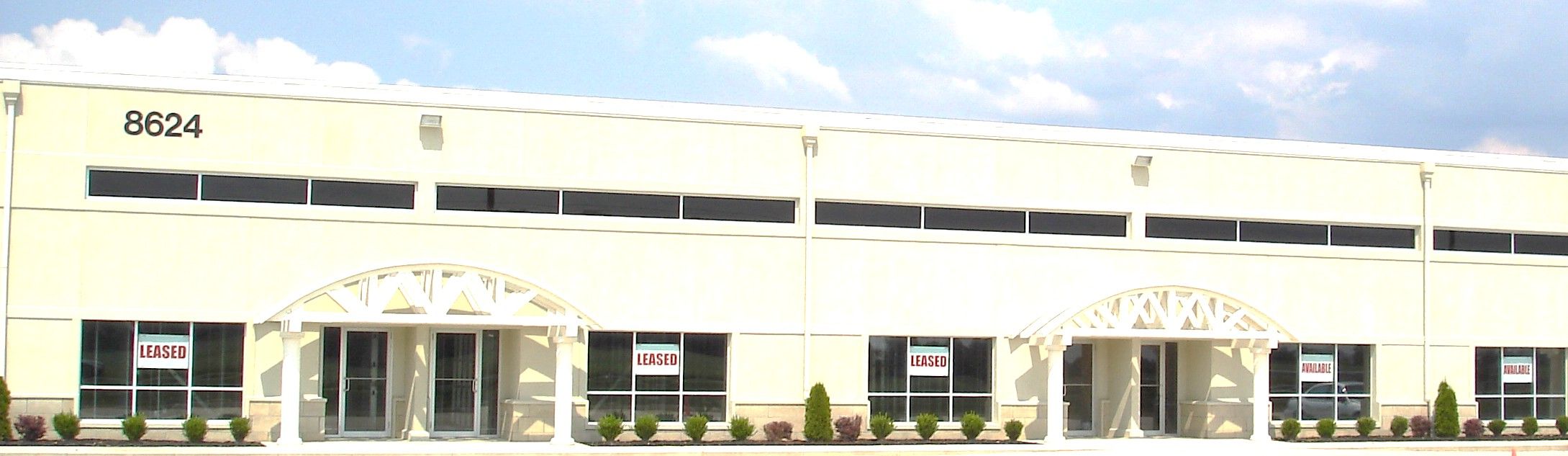
Centurion commercial complex

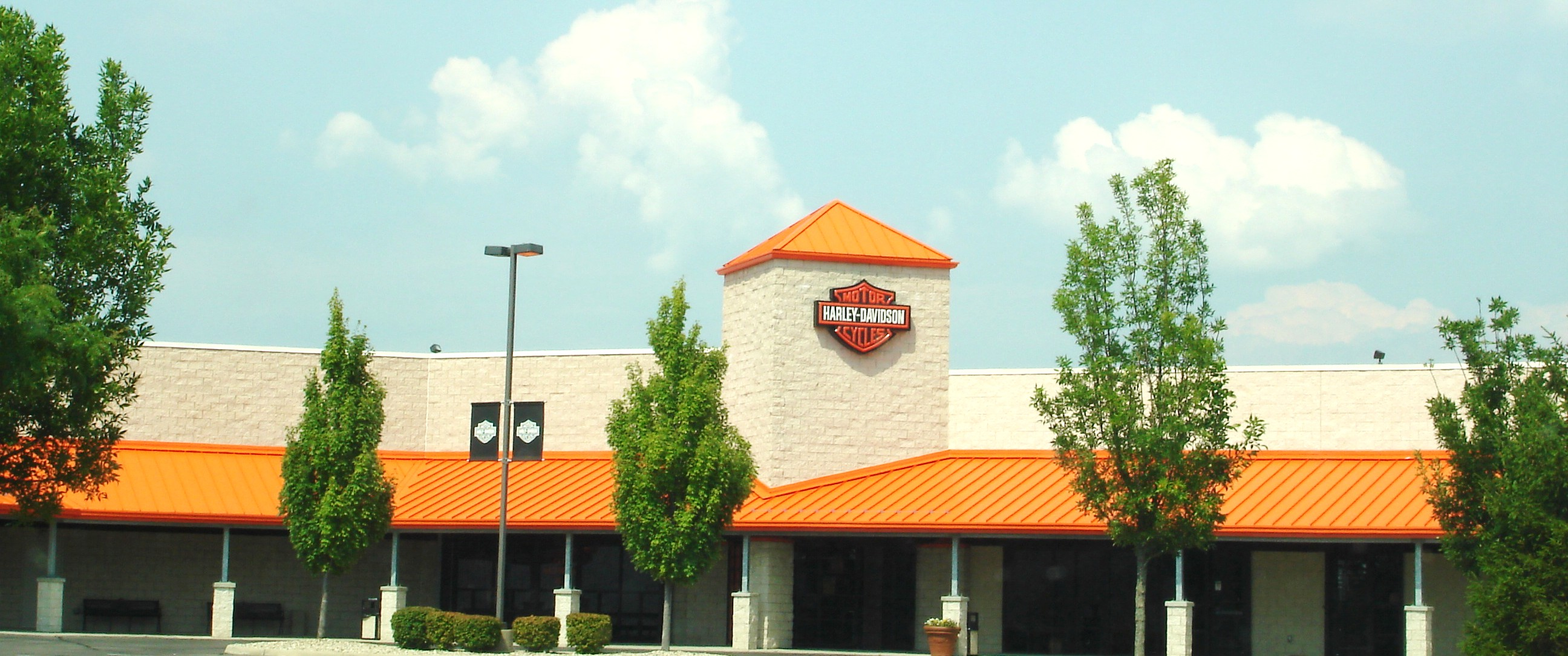
Harley Davidson dealership

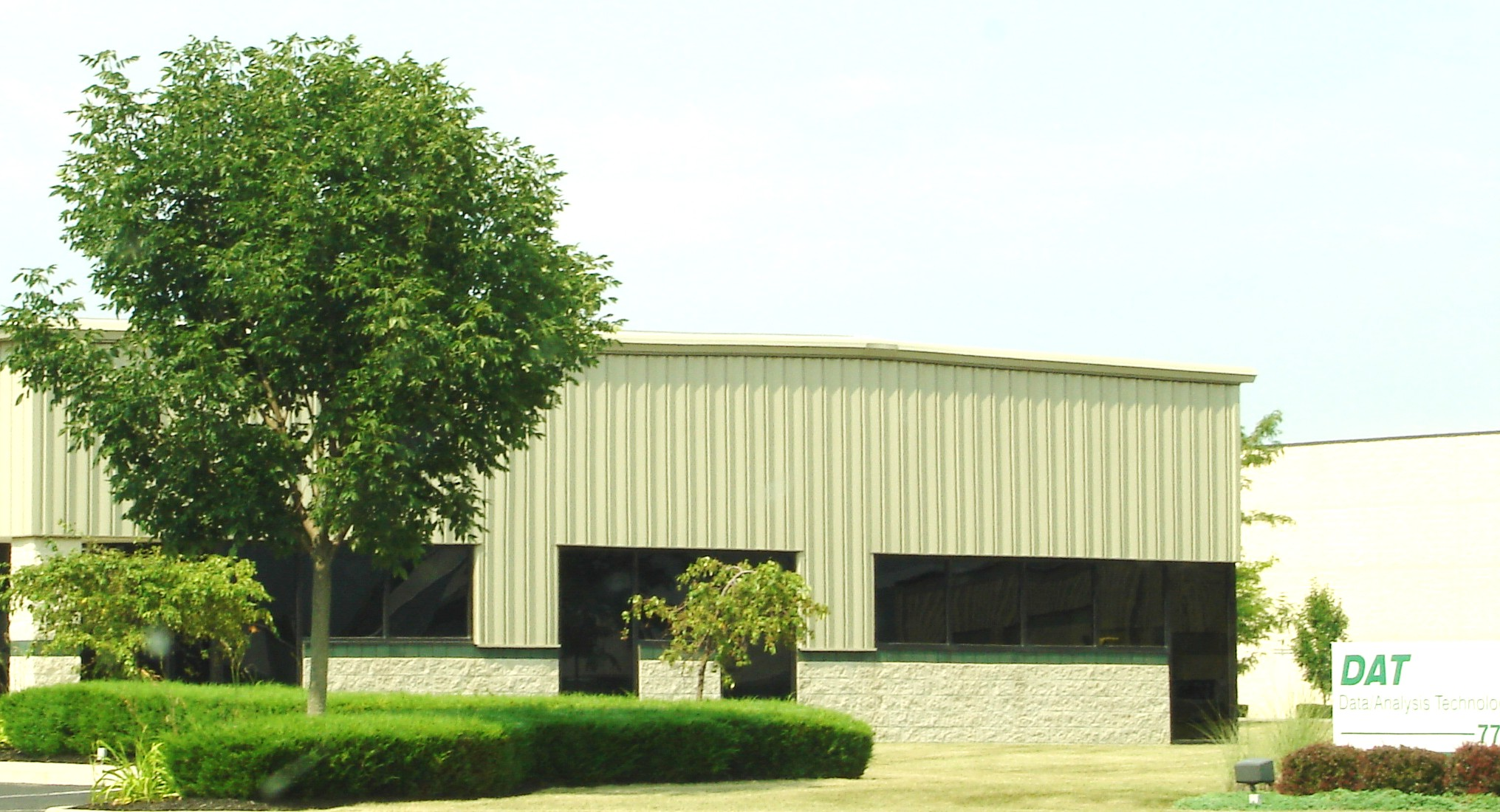
Data/Analysis Technology

Historical population
Census	Pop.	Note	%±
1990	3,462		—
2000	3,950		14.1%
2010	7,541		90.9%
2020	9,504		26.0%
Population 1900-2010.

Jerome Township is one of the fourteen townships of Union County, Ohio, United States. The 2020 census found 9,504 people in the township.

== Geography ==
Located in the southeastern corner of the county, it borders the following townships:

- Millcreek Township - north
- Concord Township, Delaware County - northeast
- Washington Township, Franklin County - southeast
- Darby Township, Madison County - south
- Darby Township - west

Parts of two municipalities are located in Jerome Township: the village of Plain City in the southwest, and the city of Dublin in the southeast. The unincorporated communities of Arnold, Jerome, and New California are also located within the township.

Its location in the southeast corner of the county makes it the closest part of the county to Columbus.

The Big Darby Creek forms parts of the township's western border with Darby Township and Plain City. A tributary of the Big Darby Creek, the Sugar Run, is fully located within the township until it meets the Big Darby Creek in neighboring Darby Township, Madison County.

== Name and history ==
It is the only Jerome Township statewide.

Jerome Township was organized on March 12, 1821. As of 1854, the population of the township was 1249.

In the Civil War, 367 residents of Jerome Township enlisted to fight. This was a remarkably high level, 151 more than were recognized as voters (only 216) and fully 25% of the population of 1398. It included several boys aged 16 and one aged 14. 75 of those who enlisted died or were killed in the war. They, and the service of township residents in the War of 1812, the Mexican War and the war with Spain in 1898, are commemorated with a war memorial more than 20 feet high in New California.

== Demographics ==
=== 2020 census ===
Jerome Township racial composition
Race	Number	Percentage
White (NH)	7,202	75.8%
Black or African American (NH)	150	1.58%
Native American (NH)	22	0.23%
Asian (NH)	1,338	14.1%
Pacific Islander (NH)	0	0%
Other/mixed	564	5.93%
Hispanic or Latino	228	2.40%

== Government ==
The township is governed by a three-member board of trustees, who are elected in November of odd-numbered years to a four-year term beginning on the following January 1. Two are elected in the year after the presidential election and one is elected in the year before it. There is also an elected township fiscal officer, who serves a four-year term beginning on April 1 of the year after the election, which is held in November of the year before the presidential election. Vacancies in the fiscal officership or on the board of trustees are filled by the remaining trustees.
