= Center Village, Ohio =

Unincorporated community in Ohio, U.S.

Coordinates: 40°9′58″N 82°48′27″W

Center Village is an unincorporated community in Harlem Township, Delaware County, in the U.S. state of Ohio.

== History ==
Variant names were Center, Centre Village, and Centerville. Center Village was laid out in 1848, and named for its location near the geographical center of Harlem Township. A post office called Centre Village was established in 1851, the name was changed to Center Village in 1893, and the post office closed in 1907.
