= S. R. Nettleton =

American politician

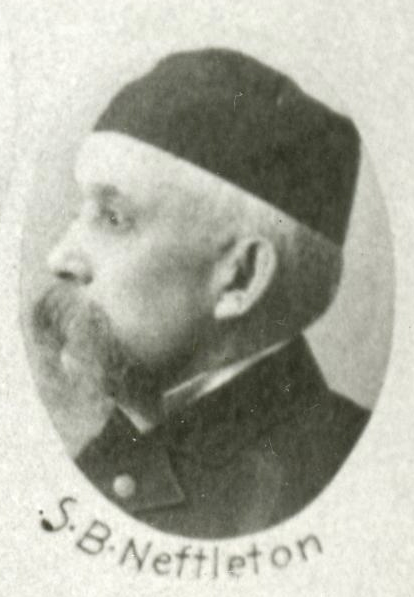
- Nettleton in 1895

Member of the Washington House of Representatives for the 40th district
- In office 1895–1897

Personal details
- Born: April 7, 1834 Delaware County, Ohio, United States
- Died: May 17, 1911 (aged 77) Kirkland, Washington, United States
- Party: Republican

Stiles Rust Nettleton (April 7, 1834 – May 17, 1911) was an American politician in the state of Washington. He served in the Washington House of Representatives from 1895 to 1897.
