= Coles Mills, Ohio =

Ghost town in Ohio, U.S.

Coordinates: 40°22′6″N 83°3′25″W

Coles Mills is a ghost town in Delaware County, in the U.S. state of Ohio. The precise location of the extinct town is unknown to the GNIS.

== History ==
A post office called Coles Mills was established in 1841, and remained in operation until 1856. The namesake mills were a sawmill and gristmill operated by Joseph C. Cole.
