= Nettleton, Mississippi =

- City
- Flag Seal

- Location in Monroe County and the state of Mississippi

- Location in the United States
- Coordinates: 34°5′18″N 88°37′22″W
- Country: United States
- State: Mississippi
- Counties: Monroe, Lee

Government
  - Mayor: Phillip Baulch

Area
  - Total: 4.04 sq mi (10.46 km^{2})
  - Land: 4.03 sq mi (10.43 km^{2})
  - Water: 0.012 sq mi (0.03 km^{2})
- Elevation: 259 ft (79 m)

Population (2020)
  - Total: 1,935
  - Density: 480.6/sq mi (185.56/km^{2})
- Time zone: UTC-6 (Central (CST))
  - Summer (DST): UTC-5 (CDT)
- Postal code: 38858
- FIPS code: 28-50880
- GNIS feature ID: 0674562
- Website: nettletonms.gov

Nettleton is a city in Lee and Monroe counties in the U.S. state of Mississippi. The population was 1,935 at the 2020 census. Incorporated in 1888, the town was named after George Henry Nettleton, president of the Kansas City, Memphis and Birmingham Railroad (KCM&B).

== Geography ==
The city sits on the boundary line between Lee County on the north and Monroe County on the south, with approximately equal portions of the city in either county. As of the 2020 census, 1,090 of the city's 1,935 residents (56.3%) lived in Monroe County and 845 (43.7%) in Lee County.

U.S. Routes 45 and 278 pass through the west side of the city on a four-lane bypass. The two highways lead north 15 miles (24 km) to Tupelo, the Lee county seat. US 45 leads south from Nettleton 20 miles (32 km) to Aberdeen, the Monroe county seat, while US 278 leads south and east 15 miles (24 km) to Amory. Mississippi Highway 6 is a two-lane road that leads southeast 11 miles (18 km) to Amory and north 15 miles (24 km) to Tupelo.

According to the U.S. Census Bureau, Nettleton has a total area of 4.0 square miles (10 km^{2}), of which 0.01 square miles (0.03 km^{2}), or 0.29%, are water. The west side of the city drains toward Town Creek, a tributary of the Tombigbee River, while Roberts Creek, a tributary of Town Creek, passes through the east side of the city.

== Demographics ==
Historical population
| Census | Pop. | Note | %± |
|---|---|---|---|
| 1900 | 570 | | — |
| 1910 | 733 | | 28.6% |
| 1920 | 653 | | −10.9% |
| 1930 | 834 | | 27.7% |
| 1940 | 861 | | 3.2% |
| 1950 | 1,204 | | 39.8% |
| 1960 | 1,389 | | 15.4% |
| 1970 | 1,591 | | 14.5% |
| 1980 | 1,911 | | 20.1% |
| 1990 | 2,462 | | 28.8% |
| 2000 | 1,932 | | −21.5% |
| 2010 | 1,992 | | 3.1% |
| 2020 | 1,935 | | −2.9% |
U.S. Decennial Census

=== 2020 census ===
As of the 2020 census, Nettleton had a population of 1,935. The median age was 40.0 years. 23.7% of residents were under the age of 18 and 19.1% of residents were 65 years of age or older. For every 100 females, there were 92.7 males, and for every 100 females age 18 and over, there were 88.9 males age 18 and over.

0.0% of residents lived in urban areas, while 100.0% lived in rural areas.

There were 780 households in Nettleton, including 551 family households. Of all households, 34.1% had children under the age of 18 living in them. Of all households, 39.0% were married-couple households, 17.4% were households with a male householder and no spouse or partner present, and 39.0% were households with a female householder and no spouse or partner present. About 25.4% of all households were made up of individuals, and 12.7% had someone living alone who was 65 years of age or older.

There were 897 housing units, of which 13.0% were vacant. The homeowner vacancy rate was 0.6% and the rental vacancy rate was 19.7%.

Racial composition as of the 2020 census
| Race | Number | Percent |
|---|---|---|
| White | 1,181 | 61.0% |
| Black or African American | 649 | 33.5% |
| American Indian and Alaska Native | 3 | 0.2% |
| Asian | 3 | 0.2% |
| Native Hawaiian and Other Pacific Islander | 1 | 0.1% |
| Some other race | 21 | 1.1% |
| Two or more races | 77 | 4.0% |
| Hispanic or Latino (of any race) | 52 | 2.7% |

=== 2000 census ===
As of the census of 2000, there were 1,932 people, 794 households, and 546 families residing in the city. The population density was 714.8 inhabitants per square mile (276.0/km^{2}). There were 868 housing units at an average density of 321.1 per square mile (124.0/km^{2}). The racial makeup of the city was 66.56% White, 32.51% African American, 0.10% Native American, 0.36% Asian, 0.16% from other races, and 0.31% from two or more races. Hispanic or Latino of any race were 0.36% of the population.

There were 794 households, out of which 31.5% had children under the age of 18 living with them, 47.5% were married couples living together, 17.5% had a female householder with no husband present, and 31.2% were non-families. 28.8% of all households were made up of individuals, and 14.9% had someone living alone who was 65 years of age or older. The average household size was 2.43 and the average family size was 3.00.

In the city, the population was spread out, with 26.3% under the age of 18, 8.1% from 18 to 24, 26.8% from 25 to 44, 23.9% from 45 to 64, and 14.9% who were 65 years of age or older. The median age was 37 years. For every 100 females, there were 85.4 males. For every 100 females age 18 and over, there were 76.7 males.

The median income for a household in the city was $25,951, and the median income for a family was $31,510. Males had a median income of $26,220 versus $18,974 for females. The per capita income for the city was $12,006. About 16.8% of families and 20.8% of the population were below the poverty line, including 20.3% of those under age 18 and 30.9% of those age 65 or over.

== Education ==
The city is served by the Nettleton School District.

After high school, many of the students attend the Itawamba Community College in Fulton.

== Notable people ==
- Fred Beckett, jazz trombone player
- Jason Ferguson, professional American football player
- Bill Hall, former Major League Baseball player
- Brandon Presley, politician
- Jim Price, former American Football League linebacker
- Paul Thorn, singer/songwriter
