= Delaware County, Ohio =

County in Ohio, United States

- County
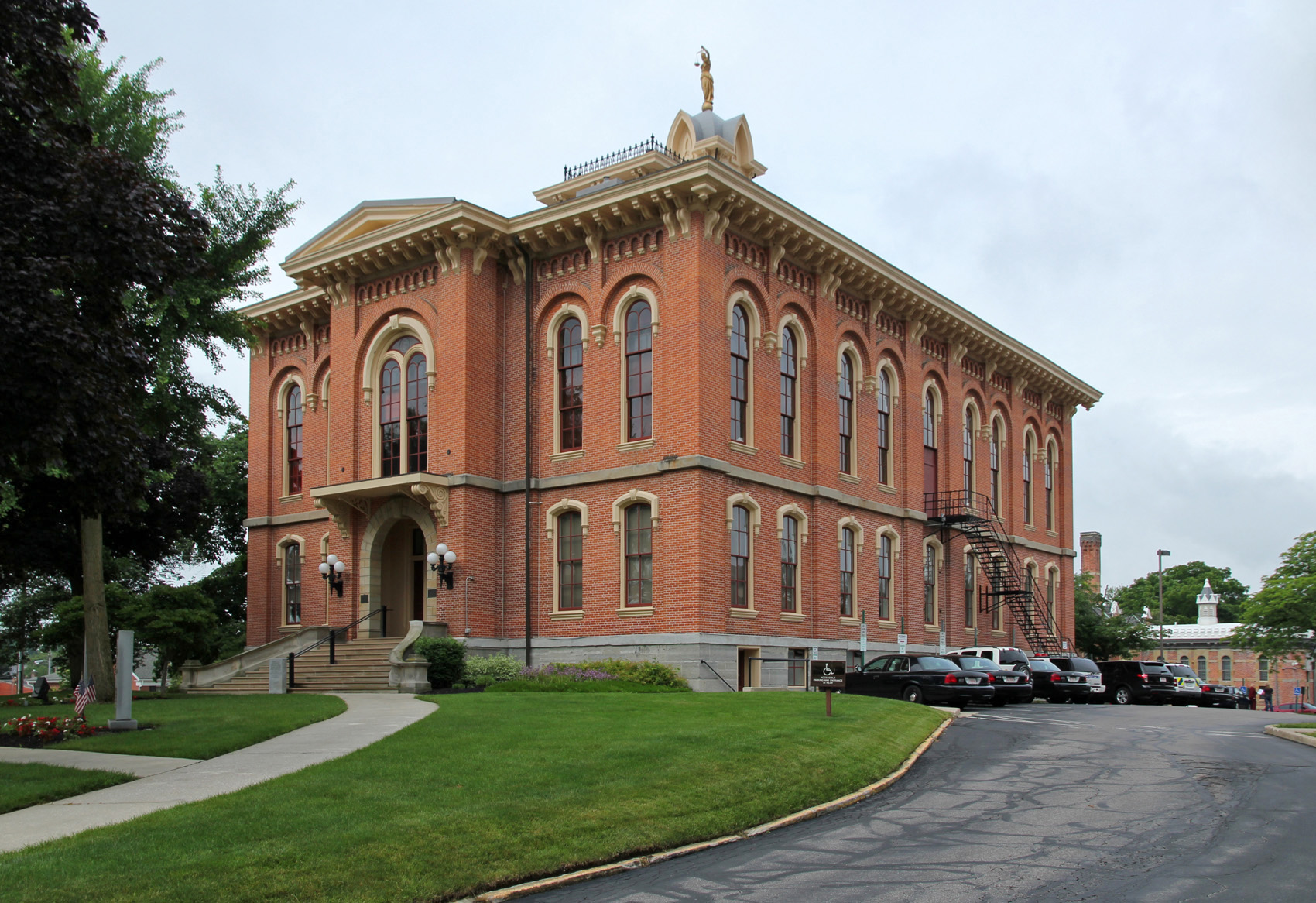
- Delaware County Courthouse

- Seal

- Location within the U.S. state of Ohio
- Coordinates: 40°17′N 83°01′W
- Country: United States
- State: Ohio
- Founded: February 10, 1808
- Named for: the Delaware Indians
- Seat: Delaware
- Largest city: Delaware

Area
  - Total: 457 sq mi (1,180 km^{2})
  - Land: 443 sq mi (1,150 km^{2})
  - Water: 14 sq mi (36 km^{2}) 3.1%

Population (2020)
  - Total: 214,124
  - Estimate (2025): 242,032 ▲
  - Density: 483/sq mi (187/km^{2})
- Time zone: UTC−5 (Eastern)
  - Summer (DST): UTC−4 (EDT)
- Congressional districts: 4th, 12th
- Website: www.co.delaware.oh.us
- *Based on population just within the county.

Delaware County is located in the central portion of the U.S. state of Ohio. As of the 2020 census, the population was 214,124. Its county seat and largest city is Delaware. The county was formed in 1808 from Franklin County, Ohio. Both the county and its seat are named after the Lenape (Delaware) people. It is a frequent placeholder on the List of highest-income counties in the United States; Delaware County was listed as the 35th wealthiest county in the United States in 2020. Delaware County is included in the Columbus, Ohio, metropolitan area. U.S. President Rutherford B. Hayes was born and raised in Delaware County. It is also home to the Columbus Zoo and Aquarium.

== History ==
The area including Delaware County was once home to numerous Native American tribes. In 1804, Colonel Moses Byxbe and Henry Baldwin, among others, migrated to central Ohio from Berkshire County, Massachusetts, and built a town on the west bank of the Olentangy River. On February 10, 1808, the Ohio government authorized the creation of Delaware County. Following the War of 1812, settlers began to arrive in the county and settled down in Delaware. The town was incorporated in 1816, being the first incorporated town in the county. Powell, originally named Middlebury, was founded in 1801, but was not incorporated until 1947. Sunbury was founded in 1816. Ohio Wesleyan University, a liberal arts college, was founded by Methodists in 1842.

Delaware County had Northern sympathies during the Civil War, and abolitionists brought the Underground Railroad through the area. A local road, Africa Road, derives its name from the era. Camp Delaware was one of the few Civil War camps that deployed African American soldiers. The Civil War played an important part in Delaware County's growth, bringing railroad business and technology. By 1900, Delaware had its first electric streetway, and an electric interurban railroad connecting Marion and Columbus ran through the county. The Little Brown Jug race was founded in 1946, and is one of the races in the Triple Crown of Harness Racing for Pacers.

In 2008, Forbes magazine ranked Delaware County as the fifth best place in the United States to raise a family and the second best in Ohio, behind Geauga County. In 2020, Delaware was rated the best county to live in Ohio and 24th in the United States by Niche, 17th healthiest county by US News, and 24th best counties to live in by 247WallSt.

== Geography ==
According to the United States Census Bureau, the county has a total area of 457 square miles (1,180 km^{2}), of which 443 square miles (1,150 km^{2}) is land and 14 square miles (36 km^{2}) (3.1%) is water. The county has an even terrain and a fertile soil.

=== Adjacent counties ===
- Morrow County (northeast)
- Knox County (far northeast)
- Licking County (southeast)
- Franklin County (south)
- Union County (west)
- Marion County (northwest)

=== Lakes and rivers ===
The major rivers of the county are the Scioto River, Olentangy River, Alum Creek, and the Big Walnut Creek. These waterways run from north to south across the county. The Alum Creek Lake and the Delaware Lake are reservoirs created on Alum Creek and the Olentangy River, respectively.

== Demographics ==
Historical population
Census	Pop.	Note	%±
1810	2,000		—
1820	7,639		282.0%
1830	11,504		50.6%
1840	22,060		91.8%
1850	21,817		−1.1%
1860	23,902		9.6%
1870	25,175		5.3%
1880	27,381		8.8%
1890	27,189		−0.7%
1900	26,401		−2.9%
1910	27,182		3.0%
1920	26,013		−4.3%
1930	26,016		0.0%
1940	26,780		2.9%
1950	30,278		13.1%
1960	36,107		19.3%
1970	42,908		18.8%
1980	53,840		25.5%
1990	66,929		24.3%
2000	109,989		64.3%
2010	174,214		58.4%
2020	214,124		22.9%
2025 (est.)	242,032	▲	13.0%
U.S. Decennial Census; 1790-1960 1900-1990; 1990-2000 2010-2020

=== 2020 census ===
As of the 2020 census, the county had a population of 214,124. The median age was 39.4 years. 26.6% of residents were under the age of 18 and 14.5% of residents were 65 years of age or older. For every 100 females, there were 97.0 males, and for every 100 females age 18 and over, there were 94.2 males.

The racial makeup of the county was 80.9% White, 3.7% Black or African American, 0.2% American Indian and Alaska Native, 8.5% Asian, <0.1% Native Hawaiian and Pacific Islander, 1.1% from some other race, and 5.6% from two or more races. Hispanic or Latino residents of any race comprised 3.3% of the population.

79.7% of residents lived in urban areas, while 20.3% lived in rural areas.

There were 77,713 households in the county, of which 39.2% had children under the age of 18 living in them. Of all households, 64.5% were married-couple households, 12.2% were households with a male householder and no spouse or partner present, and 18.5% were households with a female householder and no spouse or partner present. About 20.0% of all households were made up of individuals, and 8.3% had someone living alone who was 65 years of age or older.

There were 81,854 housing units, of which 5.1% were vacant. Among occupied housing units, 78.9% were owner-occupied and 21.1% were renter-occupied. The homeowner vacancy rate was 1.0%, and the rental vacancy rate was 9.4%.

=== Racial and ethnic composition ===
Delaware County, Ohio – Racial and ethnic composition Note: the US Census treats Hispanic/Latino as an ethnic category. This table excludes Latinos from the racial categories and assigns them to a separate category. Hispanics/Latinos may be of any race.
Race / Ethnicity (NH = Non-Hispanic)	Pop 1980	Pop 1990	Pop 2000	Pop 2010	Pop 2020	% 1980	% 1990	% 2000	% 2010	% 2020
White alone (NH)	51,920	64,670	102,943	153,969	171,420	96.43%	96.62%	93.59%	88.38%	80.06%
Black or African American alone (NH)	1,254	1,411	2,743	5,756	7,702	2.33%	2.11%	2.49%	3.30%	3.60%
Native American or Alaska Native alone (NH)	53	101	150	216	242	0.10%	0.15%	0.14%	0.12%	0.11%
Asian alone (NH)	123	377	1,684	7,393	18,158	0.23%	0.56%	1.53%	4.24%	8.48%
Native Hawaiian or Pacific Islander alone (NH)	x	x	35	47	60	x	x	0.03%	0.03%	0.03%
Other race alone (NH)	180	34	169	258	823	0.33%	0.05%	0.15%	0.15%	0.38%
Mixed race or Multiracial (NH)	x	x	1,156	2,906	8,707	x	x	1.05%	1.67%	4.07%
Hispanic or Latino (any race)	310	336	1,109	3,669	7,012	0.58%	0.50%	1.01%	2.11%	3.27%
Total	53,840	66,929	109,989	174,214	214,124	100.00%	100.00%	100.00%	100.00%	100.00%

=== 2010 census ===
As of the 2010 United States census, there were 174,214 people, 62,760 households, and 47,977 families living in the county. The population density was 393.2 inhabitants per square mile (151.8/km^{2}). There were 66,378 housing units at an average density of 149.8 units per square mile (57.8 units/km^{2}). The racial makeup of the county was 89.7% white, 4.3% Asian, 3.4% black or African American, 0.1% American Indian, 0.6% from other races, and 1.8% from two or more races. Those of Hispanic or Latino origin made up 2.1% of the population. In terms of ancestry, 34.2% were German, 16.3% were Irish, 14.0% were English, 8.1% were Italian, and 5.7% were American.

Of the 62,760 households, 41.9% had children under the age of 18 living with them, 65.8% were married couples living together, 7.3% had a female householder with no husband present, 23.6% were non-families, and 19.0% of all households were made up of individuals. The average household size was 2.74, and the average family size was 3.16. The median age was 37.4 years.

The median household income in the county was $87,908, and the median family income was $101,698. Males had a median income of $70,949 versus $48,913 for females. The county's per capita income was $40,682. About 3.4% of families and 4.6% of the population were below the poverty line, including 4.8% of those under age 18 and 5.4% of those age 65 or over.

=== 2000 census ===
As of the census of 2000, there were 109,989 people, 39,674 households, and 30,668 families living in the county. The population density is 249 people per square mile (96 people/km^{2}). There were 42,374 housing units at an average density of 96 units per square mile (37 units/km^{2}). The racial makeup of the county was 94.25% White, 2.52% Black or African American, 0.14% Native American, 1.54% Asian, 0.03% Pacific Islander, 0.38% from other races, and 1.14% from two or more races. Hispanic or Latino of any race were 1.01% of the population. 26.8% were of German, 11.7% Irish, 11.3% English, 10.7% American and 6.9% Italian ancestry according to 2000 census.

There were 39,674 households, out of which 40.10% had children under the age of 18 living with them, 67.70% were married couples living together, 6.70% had a female householder with no husband present, and 22.70% were non-families. 18.10% of all households were made up of individuals, and 5.30% had someone living alone who was 65 years of age or older. The average household size was 2.70, and the average family size was 3.09.

In the county, the population was spread out, with 28.20% under the age of 18, 7.60% from 18 to 24, 32.60% from 25 to 44, 23.30% from 45 to 64, and 8.20% who were 65 years of age or older. The median age was 35 years. For every 100 females, there were 98.00 males. For every 100 females age 18 and over, there were 94.90 males.

The median income for a household in the county was $67,258, and the median income for a family was $76,453. Males had a median income of $51,428 versus $33,041 for females. The per capita income for the county was $31,600. About 2.90% of families and 3.80% of the population were below the poverty line, including 4.40% of those under the age of 18 and 4.80% of those 65 and older.

By 2007, the median household income and family income had risen to $80,526 and $94,099, respectively.

According to the United States Census Bureau, Delaware County is the 21st fastest growing county in the United States.

== Politics ==
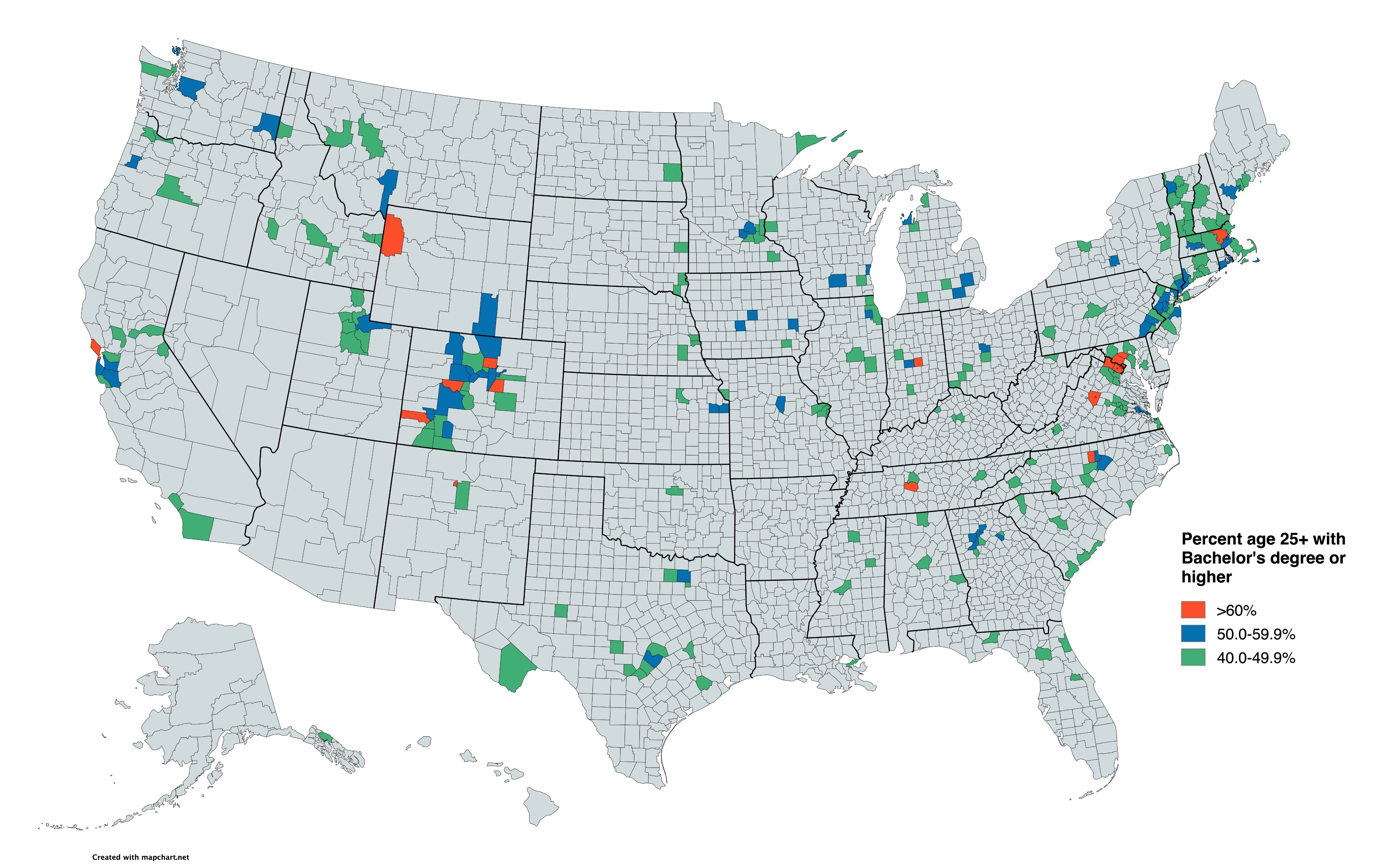
A map of the most college-educated counties in the United States

Delaware County is considered a Republican stronghold, and has been for most of the party's history. The county is highly educated, with an estimated 58% of its adult population holding bachelor's degrees. It is the most highly educated county in Ohio. The only Democratic presidential candidate to win the county from 1856 to the present day was Woodrow Wilson in his 1912 and 1916 electoral victories.

However, in 2020, Joe Biden came within single digits of flipping the county, the closest result since Lyndon Johnson's landslide victory in 1964. The growth of suburban Columbus, which has been growing increasingly Democratic in recent years, is one of the factors driving Delaware County away from its former overwhelming Republican support. In 2024, Kamala Harris won 46% of the vote in the county, the highest percentage for a Democratic presidential nominee since 1964.

In August 2023, the county voted against Ohio Issue 1, which would have changed the threshold required to modify the Ohio Constitution, by a margin of 57.72-42.28. In November 2023, the county voted for Issue 1, which amended the state constitution to guarantee a woman's reproductive rights, by a margin of 59.21%-40.79%.

United States presidential election results for Delaware County, Ohio
Year	Republican		Democratic		Third party(ies)	
Year	No.	%	No.	%	No.	%
1856	2,367	55.75%	1,649	38.84%	230	5.42%
1860	2,699	56.94%	1,967	41.50%	74	1.56%
1864	2,900	60.28%	1,911	39.72%	0	0.00%
1868	2,976	57.84%	2,169	42.16%	0	0.00%
1872	2,713	54.72%	2,013	40.60%	232	4.68%
1876	3,237	52.22%	2,809	45.31%	153	2.47%
1880	3,508	52.90%	2,968	44.75%	156	2.35%
1884	3,513	50.55%	3,078	44.29%	359	5.17%
1888	3,432	49.66%	3,004	43.47%	475	6.87%
1892	3,267	49.16%	2,710	40.78%	668	10.05%
1896	3,789	50.39%	3,612	48.04%	118	1.57%
1900	3,765	51.40%	3,337	45.56%	223	3.04%
1904	4,163	58.82%	2,607	36.83%	308	4.35%
1908	4,007	52.77%	3,330	43.86%	256	3.37%
1912	2,584	35.32%	2,934	40.10%	1,798	24.58%
1916	3,461	46.97%	3,754	50.95%	153	2.08%
1920	7,700	59.21%	5,241	40.30%	63	0.48%
1924	6,731	60.41%	3,537	31.74%	874	7.84%
1928	8,049	67.75%	3,720	31.31%	111	0.93%
1932	6,833	51.38%	6,196	46.59%	271	2.04%
1936	7,364	50.06%	7,045	47.90%	300	2.04%
1940	9,570	62.81%	5,666	37.19%	0	0.00%
1944	9,186	66.78%	4,569	33.22%	0	0.00%
1948	8,089	64.68%	4,371	34.95%	46	0.37%
1952	10,682	71.59%	4,239	28.41%	0	0.00%
1956	10,739	72.88%	3,997	27.12%	0	0.00%
1960	11,391	68.11%	5,334	31.89%	0	0.00%
1964	8,395	50.96%	8,080	49.04%	0	0.00%
1968	9,029	57.72%	4,056	25.93%	2,559	16.36%
1972	12,950	72.40%	4,452	24.89%	484	2.71%
1976	12,285	61.88%	7,058	35.55%	510	2.57%
1980	14,740	64.48%	6,417	28.07%	1,704	7.45%
1984	19,050	76.23%	5,773	23.10%	166	0.66%
1988	20,693	72.61%	7,590	26.63%	215	0.75%
1992	18,225	49.43%	9,263	25.12%	9,385	25.45%
1996	24,123	58.25%	13,463	32.51%	3,829	9.25%
2000	36,639	66.13%	17,134	30.93%	1,630	2.94%
2004	53,143	66.05%	27,048	33.62%	265	0.33%
2008	54,778	59.17%	36,653	39.59%	1,150	1.24%
2012	60,194	60.86%	37,292	37.71%	1,413	1.43%
2016	57,568	54.50%	40,872	38.69%	7,199	6.81%
2020	66,356	52.51%	57,735	45.69%	2,283	1.81%
2024	70,448	52.61%	61,657	46.04%	1,801	1.34%

United States Senate election results for Delaware County, Ohio1
Year	Republican		Democratic		Third party(ies)	
Year	No.	%	No.	%	No.	%
2024	65,715	49.41%	63,697	47.89%	3,582	2.69%

== Education ==
The following school districts are located in Delaware County.

- Big Walnut Local SD
- Buckeye Valley Local SD
- Delaware City SD
- Dublin City SD²
- Elgin Local SD³
- Johnstown-Monroe Local SD^{5}
- Northridge Local SD^{5}
- North Union Local SD^{6}
- Olentangy Local SD
- Westerville City SD^{7}

^{1} Mainly in Knox County, with portions in Delaware County
^{2} Mainly in Franklin County, with portions in Delaware County and Union County
^{3} Mainly in Marion County, with portions in Delaware County
^{4} Mainly in Morrow County, with portions in Delaware County
^{5} Mainly in Licking County, with portions in Delaware County
^{6} Mainly in Union County, with portions in Delaware County
^{7} Mainly in Franklin County, with portions in Delaware County

The Ohio Wesleyan University, located in Delaware, is a liberal arts college and one of the Five Colleges of Ohio. Columbus State Community College opened a Delaware County campus in 2010.

== Transportation ==
=== Major highways ===
- I-71
- US 23
- US 36
- US 42
- SR 3
- SR 4
- SR 37
- SR 61
- SR 229
- SR 257
- SR 315
- SR 521
- SR 605
- SR 750

=== Airports ===
The area is served by the Delaware Municipal Airport, which serves the southern Delaware County area and the northern portions of Franklin County and Columbus. The airport contains a 5,000-foot (1,500 m) runway, flight terminal, lounges, and weather briefing areas. It is home to approximately 80 aircraft, and an estimated 40,000 operations take place per year. Several smaller airports are located in the county.

== Media ==
The Delaware Gazette, a morning daily founded in 1885, is the dominant local newspaper in Delaware County, while the Sunbury News, a weekly community newspaper, serves eastern Delaware County and residents of the Big Walnut Local School District. Both publications are owned by Brown Publishing Company.

Additional local print publications include ThisWeek Delaware News, which covers the city of Delaware and the villages of Galena and Sunbury; and ThisWeek Olentangy Valley News, which covers Powell and the Olentangy Local School District. Both weekly papers are among 21 published by ThisWeek Community News, headquartered in southern Delaware County. ThisWeek is owned by GateHouse Media, which also owns the Columbus Dispatch. The Village of Shawnee Hills in southwestern Delaware County is served by a monthly newspaper - The Village Gazette. The Village Gazette is independent.

Other local publications include the Transcript, the student paper at Ohio Wesleyan University.

== Points of interest ==
Delaware is famous for The Little Brown Jug, an internationally famous harness race which is part of the Triple Crown of harness racing.

The Methodist Theological School in Ohio is the Methodist graduate school seminary located between Delaware and Columbus. It is often referred to as METHESCO.

Additional notable places include:

- Delaware Municipal Airport Annual Air Fair
- Columbus Zoo and Aquarium
- Zoombezi Bay Waterpark (formerly Wyandot Lake Adventure Park)
- Safari Golf Club
- The Germain Amphitheater, formerly the Polaris Amphitheater, closed at the end of 2007
- Alum Creek State Park and the Delaware State Park bring millions of local, national, and international visitors to the area each year.
- The site of the first Ohio State University football game
- The Hamburger Inn
- Historical Marker of Rutherford B. Hayes' home on E. William St.
- The Strand Theater
- Polaris centers of commerce (Big commercial business area including America's 2nd largest low-rise office building - JPMorgan Chase McCoy Center – and the high-end Polaris fashion place mall)
- Perkins Observatory
- The Ross Art Museum

== Communities ==
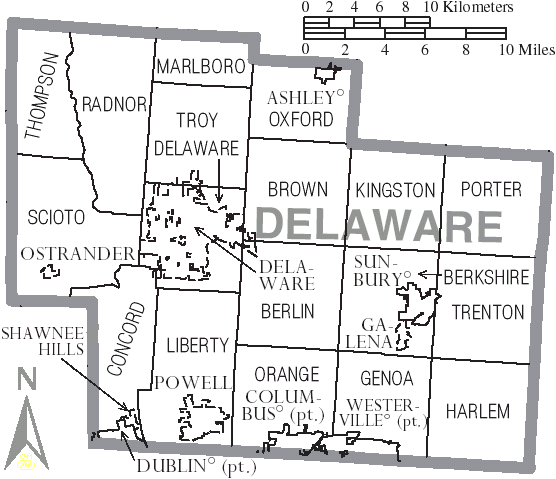
Map of Delaware County, Ohio with Municipal and Township Labels

=== Cities ===
- Columbus (state capital) (mostly in Franklin County and partly in Fairfield County)
- Delaware (county seat)
- Dublin (partly in Franklin County and Union County)
- Powell
- Sunbury
- Westerville (mostly in Franklin County)

=== Villages ===
- Ashley
- Galena
- Ostrander
- Shawnee Hills

=== Census-designated places ===
- Kilbourne
- Radnor

=== Townships ===
- Berkshire
- Berlin
- Brown
- Concord
- Delaware
- Genoa
- Harlem
- Kingston
- Liberty
- Marlboro
- Orange
- Oxford
- Porter
- Radnor
- Scioto
- Thompson
- Trenton
- Troy

=== Unincorporated communities ===
- Africa
- Alum Creek
- Bellepoint
- Berkshire
- Carpenter's Mill
- Center Village
- Cheshire
- Coles Mills
- Condit
- Cones Mills
- East Liberty
- Edinburgh
- Harlem
- Hyatts
- Kingston Center
- Leonardsburg
- Lewis Center
- Norton
- Olive Green
- Orange
- Rome
- Stratford
- Vans Valley
- White Sulphur

== Notable residents ==
Notable people who have lived in or been associated with the county include:

- Horace Newton Allen, diplomat
- Ben Curtis, professional golfer
- Amos Dolbear, physicist and inventor
- Arthur Sherwood Flemming, statesman
- Jack Hanna, zookeeper, media personality, director emeritus of the Columbus Zoo and Aquarium
- Lucy Webb Hayes, 19th First Lady of the United States
- Rutherford B. Hayes, 19th President of the United States
- Reuben James, U. S. Naval hero
- Clare Kramer, actress
- Vincente Minnelli, Academy Award-winning film director, second husband of Judy Garland, father of Liza Minnelli
- S. R. Nettleton, politician
- Nanette B. Paul (1866–1928), legal scholar, lawyer, suffragist, author, instructor, lecturer
- Norman Vincent Peale, author
- John Purdue, founding benefactor of Purdue University
- Branch Rickey, MLB executive
- Buck Rodgers, professional baseball player
- William Rosecrans, U. S. Army Major General
- Frank Sherwood Rowland, Nobel laureate
- Ezra Vogel, professor emeritus, Harvard University

== See also ==
- National Register of Historic Places listings in Delaware County, Ohio
