= Fulton Creek (Ohio) =

Coordinates: 40°22′18″N 83°11′10″W

- Etymology: Mr. Fulton

Location
- Country: United States
- State: Ohio
- Counties: Delaware, Union

Physical characteristics
- Basin size: 46.9 mi^{2} (121 km^{2})

Basin features
- Progression: Scioto River

Fulton Creek is a stream in the U.S. state of Ohio.

Fulton Creek was named for one Mr. Fulton, a 19th-century pioneer who disappeared near this creek and was not heard from again, despite an extensive search.

== See also ==
- List of rivers of Ohio
