= Condit, Ohio =

Unincorporated community in Ohio, U.S.

Coordinates: 40°15′36″N 82°47′17″W

Condit is an unincorporated community in Delaware County, in the U.S. state of Ohio.

== History ==
A post office called Condit was established in 1856, and remained in operation until 1952. The community was named after L. S. Condit, the proprietor of a local creamery. Besides the post office, Condit had a station on the Cleveland, Columbus and Mount Vernon Railroad.
