= New California, Ohio =

- Census-designated place
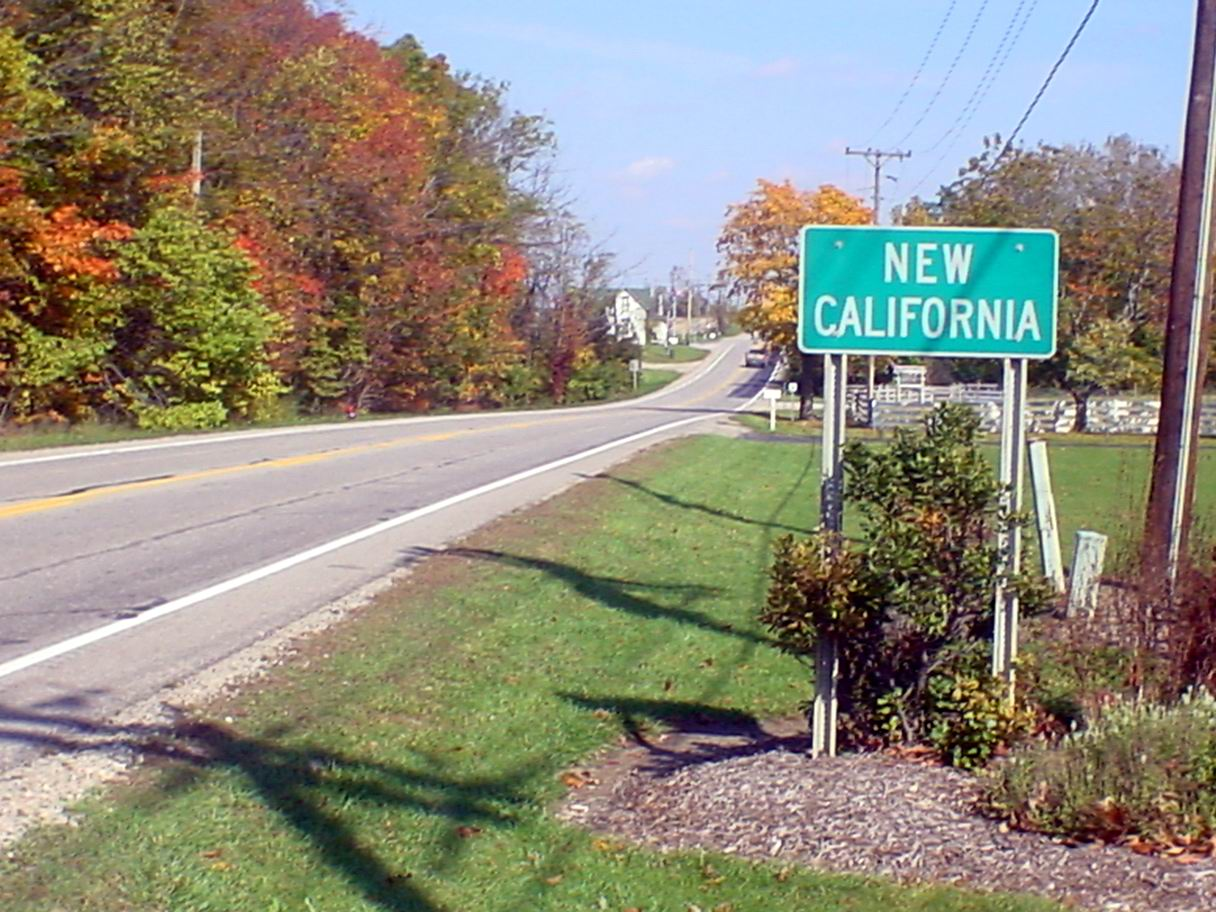

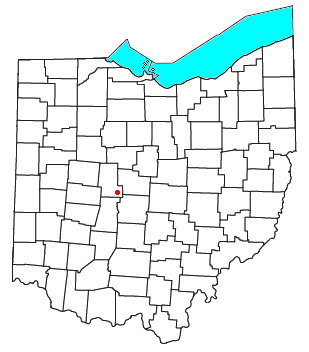
- Location of New California, Ohio
- Coordinates: 40°09′06″N 83°14′42″W
- Country: United States
- State: Ohio
- Counties: Union

Area
  - Total: 2.09 sq mi (5.41 km^{2})
  - Land: 2.06 sq mi (5.33 km^{2})
  - Water: 0.031 sq mi (0.08 km^{2})
- Elevation: 978 ft (298 m)

Population (2020)
  - Total: 2,225
  - Density: 1,081.1/sq mi (417.42/km^{2})
- Time zone: UTC-5 (Eastern (EST))
  - Summer (DST): UTC-4 (EDT)
- ZIP code: 43064
- Area code: 614
- GNIS feature ID: 2628939

New California is a census-designated place in central Jerome Township, Union County, Ohio, United States. It is located at the intersection of U.S. Route 42 and Industrial Parkway, just south of 42's intersection with U.S. Route 33. The population was 2,225 at the 2020 census.

== History ==
New California was platted in 1853. According to tradition, news of a man passing through the settlement to California caused the name to be selected. The New California Post office was established on January 7, 1850, but was discontinued on May 14, 1904. The mail service is now sent through the Plain City branch.

On September 19, 2009, a new Ohio historical marker was dedicated in New California. The marker symbolizes the fact that 367 men from Jerome Township joined the Union cause, giving it one of the highest per capita rates for service in the nation during the American Civil War, and also the fact that seventeen of those veterans are buried in the community's small cemetery.

== Demographics ==
Historical population
Census	Pop.	Note	%±
2020	2,225		—
U.S. Decennial Census

== Education ==
Most of New California CDP is in Jonathan Alder Local School District while some parts are in Dublin City School District and in Fairbanks Local School District.

The comprehensive high school of the first district is Jonathan Alder High School.

The zoned schools for the Dublin City School District portion are: Glacier Ridge Elementary School, Eversole Run Middle School, and Dublin Jerome High School.
