= Nettleton School District (Mississippi) =

Public school district in Nettleton, Mississippi, USA

Location
- Nettleton, Mississippi

District information
- Type: Public
- Superintendent: Ken Byars

Students and staff
- Students: approx. 1350

Other information
- Website: www.nettletonschools.com

The Nettleton School District is a public school district based in Nettleton, Mississippi (USA).

The district serves northwestern Monroe and southeastern Lee counties.

== Schools ==
- Nettleton High School
- Nettleton Intermediate School
- Nettleton Primary School

== Demographics ==
=== 2006-07 school year ===
There were a total of 1,359 students enrolled in the Nettleton School District during the 2006–2007 school year. The gender makeup of the district was 50% female and 50% male. The racial makeup of the district was 27.74% African American, 71.52% White, 0.66% Hispanic, and 0.07% Asian. 52.0% of the district's students were eligible to receive free lunch.

=== Previous school years ===
School Year	Enrollment	Gender Makeup		Racial Makeup				
School Year	Enrollment	Female	Male	Asian	African American	Hispanic	Native American	White
2005-06	1,394	50%	50%	0.14%	28.91%	0.65%	–	70.30%
2004-05	1,388	49%	51%	–	29.03%	0.43%	–	70.53%
2003-04	1,392	49%	51%	0.14%	29.09%	0.29%	–	70.47%
2002-03	1,381	49%	51%	0.07%	30.05%	0.22%	–	69.66%

== Accountability statistics ==
	2006-07	2005-06	2004-05	2003-04	2002-03
District Accreditation Status	Accredited	Accredited	Accredited	Accredited	Accredited
School Performance Classifications
Level 5 (Superior Performing) Schools	1	1	0	1	0
Level 4 (Exemplary) Schools	2	2	3	3	2
Level 3 (Successful) Schools	0	0	0	0	2
Level 2 (Under Performing) Schools	0	0	0	0	0
Level 1 (Low Performing) Schools	0	0	0	0	0
Not Assigned	0	0	0	0	0

== Racially segregated student government election policy ==
On August 26, 2010, The Smoking Gun posted a memo which Nettleton Middle School had distributed to all students in grades 6–8. The memo described the rules for the student government election, including specifications that only students of particular races be elected to particular posts. Of the twelve posts, eight were reserved for white students. The highest posts, the president for each grade level, were all reserved for whites. Some parents complained about this policy. At around the same time, school superintendent Russell Taylor issued a statement saying that the policy was being reviewed. As a firestorm of news coverage developed in the next day, the school board voted in an emergency meeting on August 27, 2010 to reverse the policy. The district's press release stated that the policy had existed for over 30 years, and was intended to "ensure minority representation and involvement in the student body."

== See also ==
- List of school districts in Mississippi
