= Ohio State Route 315 =

State highway in central Ohio, US

State Route 315

Route information
- Maintained by ODOT
- Length: 22.48 mi (36.18 km)
- Existed: 1933–present

Major junctions
- South end: I-70 / I-71 in Columbus
- US 22 / SR 3 in Columbus; US 33 / US 40 in Columbus; I-670 in Columbus; I-270 in Worthington
- North end: US 23 near Delaware

Location
- Country: United States
- State: Ohio
- Counties: Franklin, Delaware

Highway system
- Ohio State Highway System; Interstate; US; State; Scenic
← SR 314	→ SR 316

State Route 315, known locally as the Olentangy Expressway, running almost parallel to Olentangy River Road for most of its length, is a north–south highway in central Ohio, in the Columbus metropolitan area. It may be seen abbreviated as SR 315, OH-315, or simply 315. Its southern terminus is at the south junction of I-70 and I-71 in Columbus, and its northern terminus is at US 23 near Delaware. It is a controlled access freeway from its southern terminus to I-270. The controlled access section carries two or three lanes in each direction, depending on the location. North of I-270, it becomes a two-lane road. It roughly follows the Olentangy River for about two-thirds of its length. The route passes through the Ohio State University campus. The section between Interstate 670 and Interstate 70 is known as the West Innerbelt, and it is commonly referred to as such in traffic reports. The original name of this section was Sandusky Street.

== Route description ==
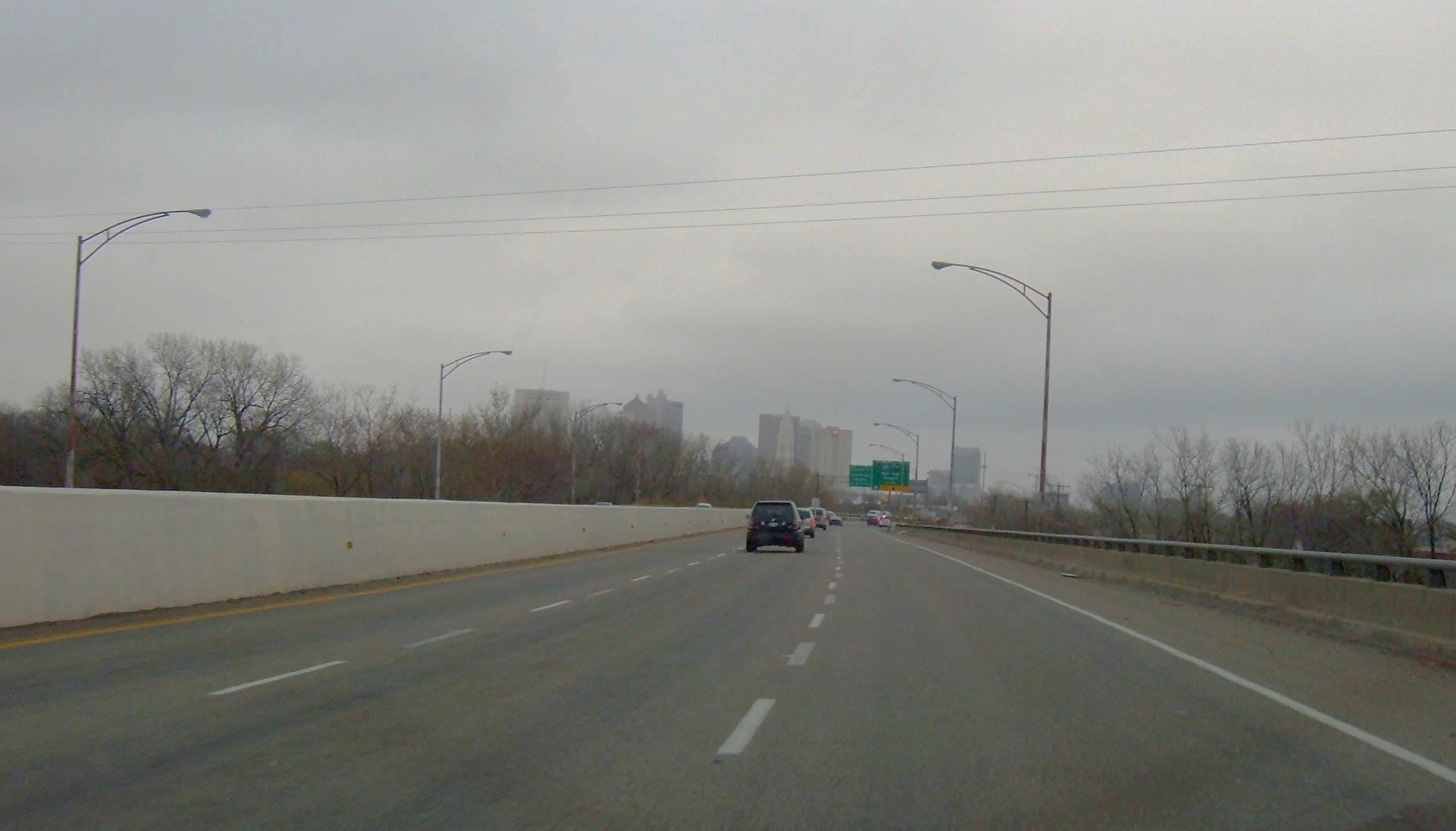
Southbound at 5th Avenue

State Route 315 begins at an interchange with Interstates 70 and 71 on the southwest corner of downtown Columbus. Shortly after this interchange, the route meets US 62 and SR 3 at a split diamond interchange with Rich Street and Town Street. The route then meets US 33 and Interstate 670 at the complex Sandusky-Spring interchange. Near the Wexner Medical Center, the route has slip ramps that allow access to Medical Center Drive and Olentangy River Road. The road then runs along the west side of the Ohio State University campus, meeting Lane Avenue and Ackerman Road at diamond interchanges.

Shortly after Ackerman Road, the roadway turns sharply east, then sharply north at North Broadway to avoid both Union Cemetery and Riverside Methodist Hospital. Now closely following the Olentangy River, the route has a partial interchange with Henderson Road/Olentangy River Road. After this, the route meets the terminus of Bethel Road in a modified diamond interchange. At exit 10, the road meets SR 161 at a diamond interchange before the freeway ends at a windmill interchange with Interstate 270.

The road briefly continues as a 4-lane divided highway until an intersection with Olentangy River Road/Mason Place, where it is reduced to two lanes. After passing through some wooded areas and housing developments, the route meets SR 750 near the village of Powell. This is the last major intersection before the route ends at US 23 in Stratford.

== History ==
State Route 315 was signed in 1932 along its current routing between SR 161 near Linworth and US 23 near Stratford. The entire route was paved by 1935. By 1966, the route had been extended to downtown Columbus along the previously unnumbered Olentangy River Road, ending at an intersection with US 33.

By 1967, a portion of freeway had opened between Interstate 71 and Interstate 670 along Sandusky Street. From there to Henderson Road, the route was a 4-lane surface road. Freeway construction continued in pieces throughout the 1970s, requiring the relocation of some parts of the Olentangy River.

By 1980, the only remaining freeway gap was between Ackerman Road and Henderson Road. This section had been a point of contention since 1969, when the Marburn Women's Action Group (MWAG) was formed. The MWAG successfully lobbied the Ohio General Assembly to revise Sec. 1721.01 of the Ohio Revised Code, allowing the freeway to be built on unused Union Cemetery land. This avoided the displacement of homeowners in the Marburn neighborhood. The road also had to avoid the Riverside Methodist Hospital, thus resulting in two sharp curves at North Broadway.

In 2005, a section of the route between King Avenue and the Franklin/Delaware county line was named in honor of Lawrence E. Hughes, who was a major influence for the construction of the Olentangy Freeway.

== Exit list ==
County	Location	mi	km	Exit	Destinations	Notes
Franklin	Columbus	0.00– 0.44	0.00– 0.71	—	I-70 / I-71 – Wheeling, Cleveland, Dayton	Mound-Sandusky Interchange; I-70 exit 99B; I-71 exit 106B.
Franklin	Columbus	0.51– 0.79	0.82– 1.27	1A	US 62 (Rich Street) / SR 3 (Town Street)	Split diamond interchange with one-way couplet
Franklin	Columbus	0.92	1.48	1B	US 40 (West Broad Street)	Southbound exit from I-670/US 33 ramps only; exit to West Broad Street from OH-315 southbound is prohibited.
Franklin	Columbus	1.21– 1.70	1.95– 2.74	1C	US 33 (Dublin Road)	Northbound exit and southbound entrance; part of Spring Sandusky Interchange
Franklin	Columbus	1.29– 1.66	2.08– 2.67	1D	I-670 (John Glenn Columbus International Airport)	Northbound-westbound and eastbound-southbound movements handled by US 33, Spring Sandusky Interchange; I-670 exit 2B eastbound to 315 northbound, 2A-B westbound.
Franklin	Columbus	1.97– 2.59	3.17– 4.17	2	SR 315C (Goodale Street) / CR 9 (Olentangy River Road) to I-670	
Franklin	Columbus	3.18– 3.26	5.12– 5.25	3	Medical Center Drive/King Avenue	Northbound exit and southbound entrance; access to Ohio State University Wexner Medical Center
Franklin	Columbus	3.69– 3.81	5.94– 6.13	3	CR 9 (Olentangy River Road) / CR 176 (Kinnear Road)	Southbound exit and northbound entrance; southbound access to King Avenue, Fifth Avenue, and Third Avenue
Franklin	Columbus	4.20– 4.49	6.76– 7.23	4	CR 59 (Lane Avenue)	Access to Ohio State University, Ohio Stadium, Schottenstein Center and Upper Arlington
Franklin	Columbus	5.03– 5.35	8.10– 8.61	5	CR 52M (Ackerman Road)	
Franklin	Columbus	5.69– 6.52	9.16– 10.49	6	CR 523 (West North Broadway) / CR 9 (Olentangy River Road)	Signed as exits 6A (west) and 6B (Olentangy River Road) northbound. Access to Riverside Methodist Hospital.
Franklin	Columbus	7.61– 8.11	12.25– 13.05	7	CR 55 (Henderson Road) / CR 9 (Olentangy River Road)	
Franklin	Columbus	8.35– 8.83	13.44– 14.21	8	CR 67 (Bethel Road)	
Franklin	Worthington	10.22– 10.59	16.45– 17.04	10	SR 161 (Dublin–Granville Road)	
Franklin	Sharon Township	11.66– 12.28	18.76– 19.76	12	I-270 (Jack Nicklaus Freeway)	I-270 exits 22A-B; Modified cloverleaf interchange.
Franklin	Sharon Township	12.28	19.76	Northern end of freeway		
Delaware	Liberty Township	15.22	24.49		SR 750 (Powell Road)	
Delaware	Delaware Township	22.48	36.18		US 23 (Columbus Pike)	Northern terminus of SR 315
1.000 mi = 1.609 km; 1.000 km = 0.621 mi: Concurrency terminus; Incomplete access

== State Route 315C ==
State Route 315C
- Location: Columbus, Ohio
- Length: 1.09 mi (1.75 km)

An unsigned State Route 315C exists which begins on the Interstate 670 westbound ramp to Neil Avenue, follows Neil south to the Goodale-Neil Connector and Goodale Avenue, then up Olentangy River Road and onto the ramp to State Route 315 southbound, where it ends. It is clear from the Straight Line Diagram that SR 315C exists westbound only.
