= O'Shaughnessy Dam =

O'Shaughnessy Dam can refer to:

- O'Shaughnessy Dam (California), the dam that creates the Hetch Hetchy reservoir in Yosemite National Park
- O'Shaughnessy Dam (Ohio), near Columbus
