= Concord Township, Delaware County, Ohio =

Township in Ohio, US

- Township
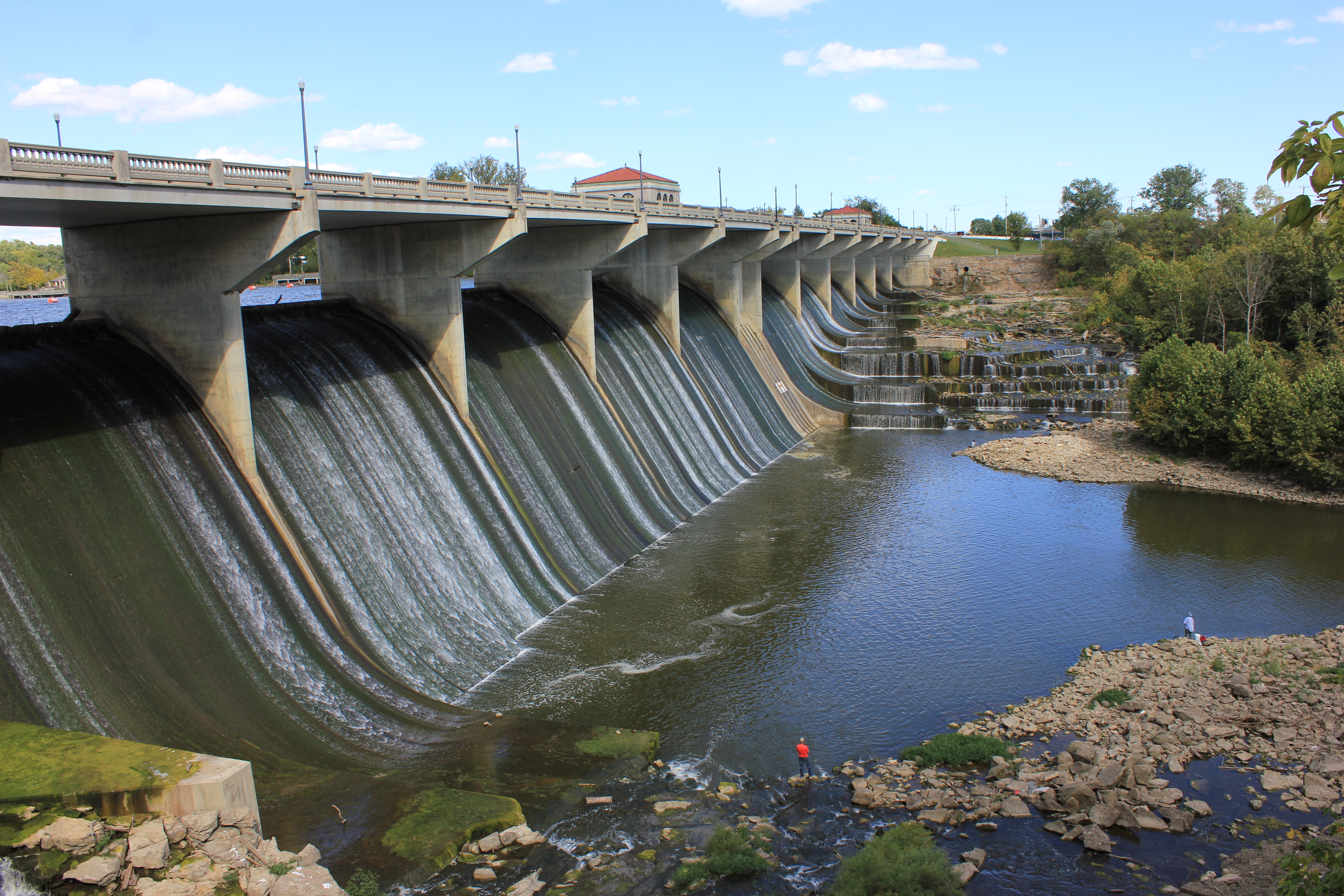
- O'Shaughnessy Dam

- Location of Concord Township in Delaware County
- Coordinates: 40°11′7″N 83°8′15″W
- Country: United States
- State: Ohio
- County: Delaware

Area
  - Total: 22.3 sq mi (57.8 km^{2})
  - Land: 21.1 sq mi (54.7 km^{2})
  - Water: 1.2 sq mi (3.1 km^{2})
- Elevation: 922 ft (281 m)

Population (2020)
  - Total: 11,207
  - Density: 531/sq mi (205/km^{2})
- Time zone: UTC-5 (Eastern (EST))
  - Summer (DST): UTC-4 (EDT)
- FIPS code: 39-18140
- GNIS feature ID: 1086045
- Website: www.concordtwp.org

Concord Township is one of the eighteen townships of Delaware County, Ohio, United States. The 2020 census found 11,207 people in the township.

== Geography ==
Located in the southwestern corner of the county, it borders the following townships and city:

- Delaware Township - northeast
- Liberty Township - east
- Dublin - south
- Jerome Township, Union County - southwest
- Millcreek Township, Union County - west
- Scioto Township - northwest

Three municipalities are located in Concord Township:

- Part of the city of Delaware, the county seat of Delaware County, in the northeast
- Part of the city of Dublin, in the south
- The village of Shawnee Hills, in the southeast

The unincorporated community of Bellepoint lies in the township's north.

=== Waterways ===
- The Scioto River bisects the township from north to south.
- O'Shaughnessy Reservoir is on the Scioto River and was created by the O'Shaughnessy Dam, completed in 1925, in southern Concord Township.
- Mill Creek enters the townships in the northwest panhandle and joins the Scioto River at the northern end of O'Shaughnessy Reservoir.
- Eversole Run drains much of western Concord Township emptying into O'Shaughnessy Reservoir north of Shawnee Hills.

=== Major roadways ===
- U.S. Route 42 crosses the northern section of Concord Township from northeast to southwest just south of Bellpoint.
- Ohio Route 257 is a major north–south route through the township. OH 257 follows the east shore of O'Shaughnassey Reservoir, crosses the Scioto River with US 42 and continues north following the west bank of the Scioto River. The road passes through Bellpoint.
- Ohio Route 745 is the other major north–south route through the township. OH 745 follows predominantly along the west shore of O'Saughnassey Reservoir from Shawnee Hill to US 42 within the township.

== Name and history ==
Concord Township was formed in 1819.

It is one of seven Concord Townships statewide.

== Demographics ==
=== 2020 census ===
Concord Township racial composition
| Race | Number | Percentage |
|---|---|---|
| White (NH) | 8.951 | 79.9% |
| Black or African American (NH) | 199 | 1.78% |
| Native American (NH) | 12 | 0.11% |
| Asian (NH) | 1,046 | 9.33% |
| Pacific Islander (NH) | 6 | 0.05% |
| Other/mixed | 679 | 6.06% |
| Hispanic or Latino | 314 | 2.80% |

== Government ==
The township is governed by a three-member board of trustees, who are elected in November of odd-numbered years to a four-year term beginning on the following January 1. Two are elected in the year after the presidential election and one is elected in the year before it. There is also an elected township fiscal officer, who serves a four-year term beginning on April 1 of the year after the election, which is held in November of the year before the presidential election. Vacancies in the fiscal officership or on the board of trustees are filled by the remaining trustees.

== Public services ==
Primary emergency medical services and fire suppression are provided by Concord Township Fire and Rescue.
