= Mill Creek (Scioto River tributary) =

Stream in central Ohio, U.S.

Coordinates: 40°14′40″N 83°08′55″W

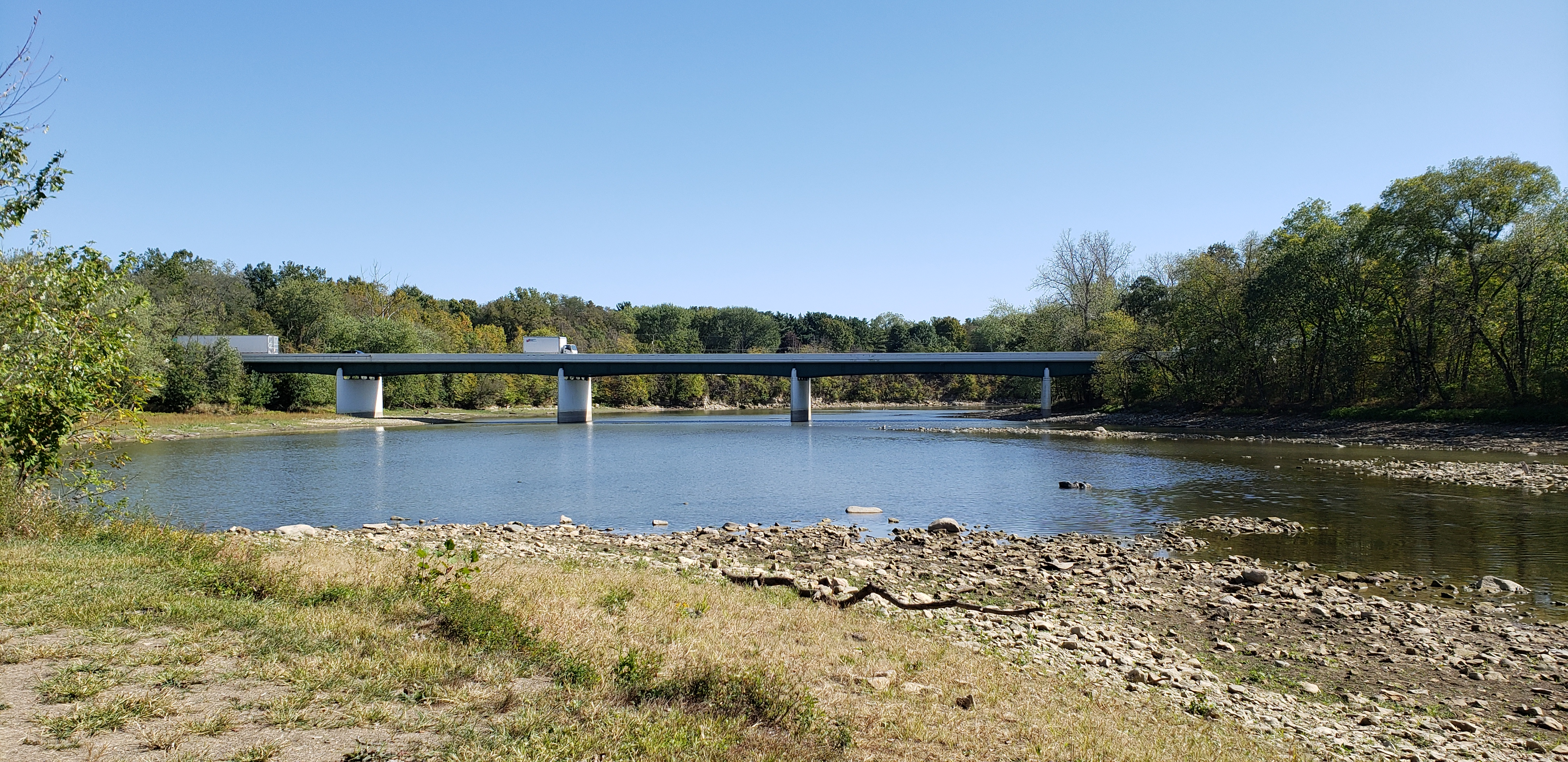
The confluence of Scioto River and Mill Creek at The Point in Bellepoint, Ohio, facing southwards towards U.S. Highway 42 and Ohio State Route 257

Mill Creek is a stream in central Ohio. It is a tributary of the Scioto River.

Early settlers built and operated many watermills along Mill Creek, hence the name.

Marysville, Ohio, is the largest settlement on Mill Creek.

A USGS gauge on the creek at Bellepoint recorded a mean annual discharge of 176 cubic feet per second (5.0 m^{3}/s) during water years 1944–2019.

== See also ==
- List of rivers of Ohio
