= Ohio State Route 745 =

State highway in central Ohio, US

State Route 745

Route information
- Maintained by ODOT
- Length: 9.99 mi (16.08 km)
- Existed: 1937–present

Major junctions
- South end: US 33 / SR 161 in Dublin
- North end: US 42 / SR 257 in Concord Township

Location
- Country: United States
- State: Ohio
- Counties: Franklin, Delaware

Highway system
- Ohio State Highway System; Interstate; US; State; Scenic
← SR 744	→ SR 746

State Route 745 (SR 745) is a state route in central Ohio that runs in a north-northwesterly direction along the west bank of the Scioto River. Its southern terminus is at the concurrency of U.S. Route 33 (US 33) and SR 161 in Dublin, and it runs for approximately ten miles (16 km) to Concord Township in Delaware County, where it arrives at its northern terminus at the concurrency of US 42 and SR 257. SR 745 was designated in 1937, and its routing has not changed since.

== Route description ==
Traffic volume on State Route 745
County Log Point	Volume
1.034	17,060
0.00	8,290
1.79	6,670
3.828	4,500
6.966	2,950
County log points reset at county line; Volume: AADT; Source:

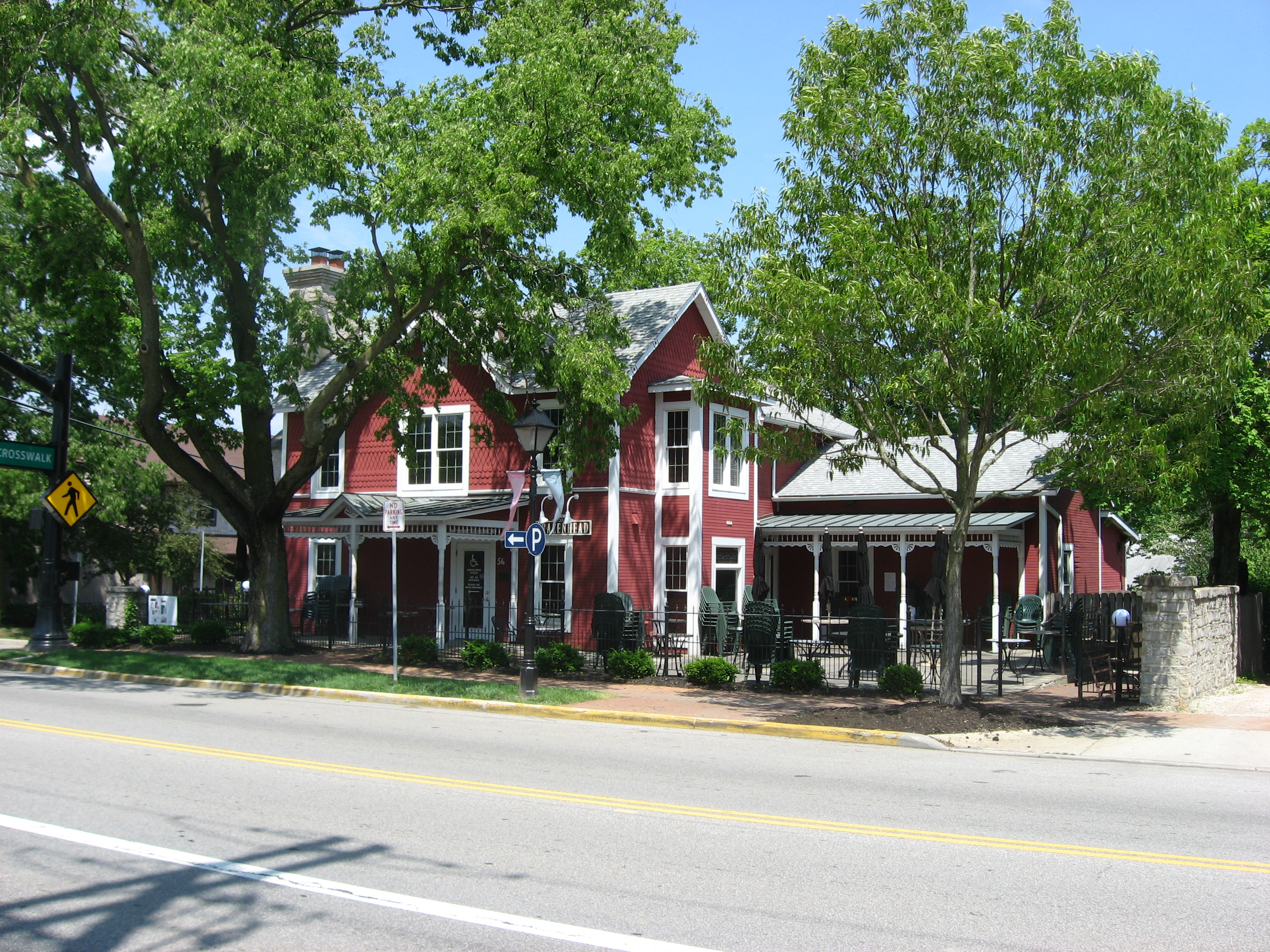
Artz House on State Route 745, in downtown Dublin, Ohio

SR 745 commences at the signalized intersection between the concurrent US 33 and SR 161 and High Street in Dublin. Running north from there, the two-lane state highway passes through a residential portion of the northwestern Columbus suburb. After crossing underneath a lengthy bridge that takes Interstate 270 over SR 745, the Scioto River and SR 257, the state route meets Emerald Parkway at a traffic signal. Now running in a north-northwesterly direction, SR 745 passes through a roundabout at Brand Road, then continues on through a residential setting up to the point where it crosses from Franklin County into Delaware County.

Still within the city limits of Dublin, SR 745 makes its way up to a signalized intersection with Glick Road, just west of the O'Shaughnessy Dam, where the Scioto River widens out into the O'Shaughnessy Reservoir. Entering into Shawnee Hills, the state highway passes through a primarily commercial district, in parallel to the reservoir. SR 745 departs Shawnee Hills, and as it enters into rural Concord Township, it meets Harriott Drive, then crosses over a western arm of the O'Shaughnessy Reservoir. Continuing north-northwesterly, the state highway passes intersections with Cook Road and Merchant Road before arriving at a four-way stop intersection with Home Road. Now passing amidst a rural backdrop with a mix of woods, farmland and occasional houses, SR 745 intersects Duffy Road and Moore Road prior to arriving at its northern terminus, a signalized intersection with US 42 and SR 257 in Concord Township. SR 257, which crosses the Scioto River with US 42 just to the east of this junction, picks up where SR 745 leaves off heading northward from US 42.

== History ==
SR 745 was established in 1937 along its current routing, and has not seen any significant changes since its inception.

== Major intersections ==
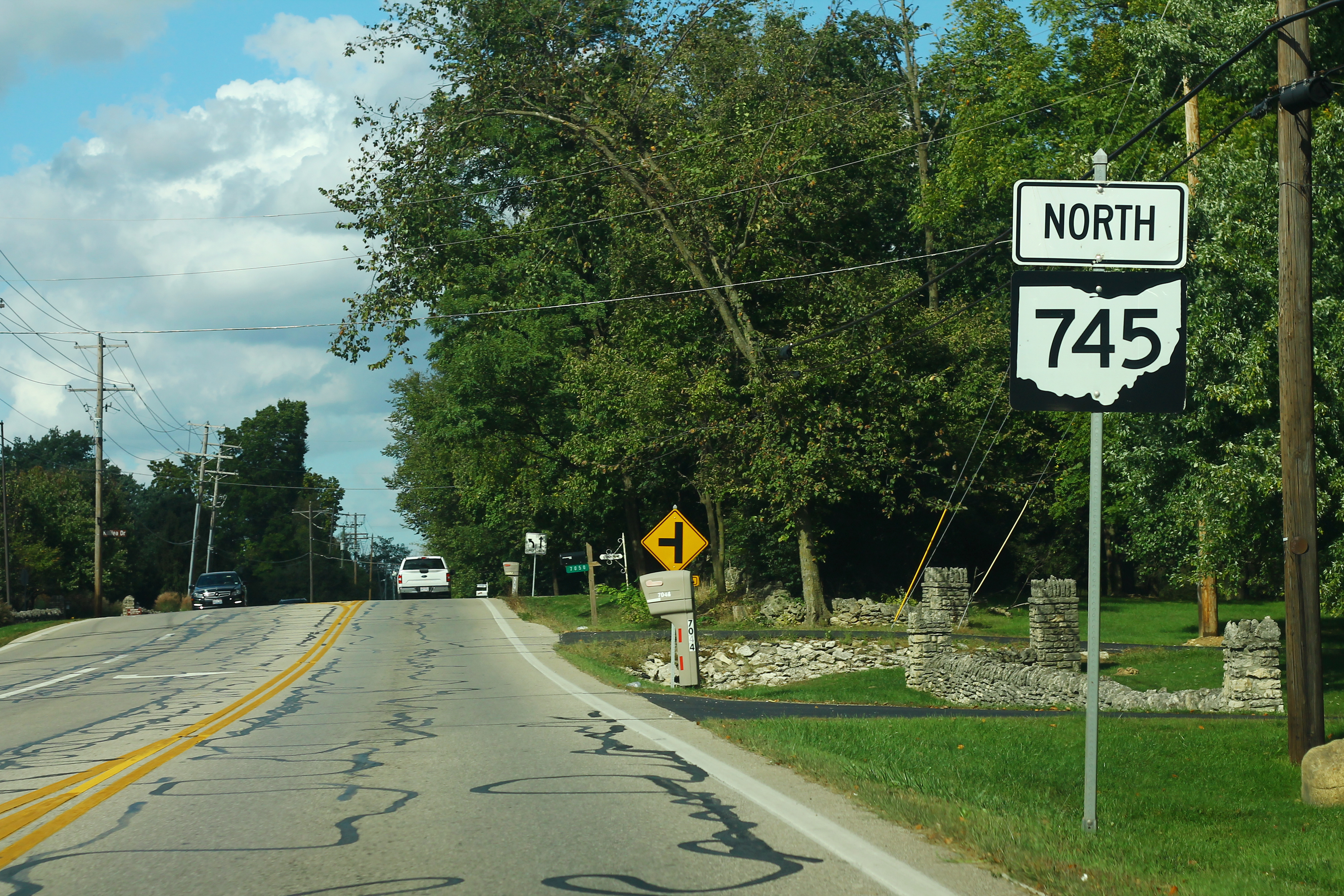
A sign denoting Ohio State Route 745, located in Dublin.

County	Location	mi	km	Destinations	Notes
Franklin	Dublin	0.00	0.00	US 33 / SR 161 (Bridge Street) to South High Street / I-270	
Delaware	Concord Township	9.99	16.08	US 42 / SR 257	
1.000 mi = 1.609 km; 1.000 km = 0.621 mi
