= Ohio State Route 750 =

State highway in Delaware County, Ohio, US

State Route 750

Route information
- Maintained by ODOT
- Length: 9.67 mi (15.56 km)
- Existed: 1937–present

Major junctions
- West end: SR 257 near Powell
- US 23 near Powell
- East end: I-71 in Columbus

Location
- Country: United States
- State: Ohio
- Counties: Delaware

Highway system
- Ohio State Highway System; Interstate; US; State; Scenic
← SR 749	→ SR 751

State Route 750 (SR 750) is an east–west state highway located in central Ohio. The western terminus of the state highway is at a signalized intersection with SR 257 nearly 2.5 miles (4.0 km) west of Powell, just outside the Columbus Zoo and Aquarium. The highway travels east to Highbanks Metro Park and Polaris Fashion Place. The eastern terminus of SR 750 is at Interstate 71 (I-71) in the far northern reaches of the city of Columbus. The route was designated in 1937, and both termini were rerouted. The eastern terminus was extended east in 1997, and the western terminus was rerouted south in 2007.

== Route description ==
The entirety of SR 750 exists within southwestern Delaware County. SR 750 starts at SR 257, near Columbus Zoo and Aquarium. SR 750 goes through Powell with no major intersections. After Powell, there is an intersection with SR 315 near the Olentangy River and the northwest corner of Highbanks Metro Park. The route soon intersects U.S. Route 23 (US 23) in a large commercial area. Less than one mile later, SR 750 overpasses railroads owned by CSX and Norfolk Southern. The road dips southeastward, and becomes Polaris Parkway, as it slowly curves around the Polaris Fashion Place. Powell Road continues eastward toward Westerville. SR 750 ends at I-71 at an incomplete partial cloverleaf interchange, and Polaris Parkway continues eastward to Westerville. The highest traffic count is near US 23, where 29,690 vehicles travel the highway on average each day. The lowest traffic count is near SR 257, where 8,080 vehicles travel the highway on average each day.

== History ==
SR 750 was established in 1937, ran from SR 257 to its junction with SR 315. In 1997, SR 750 was extended eastward from SR 315, crossing the Olentangy River and US 23 via Powell Road, then following Polaris Parkway around to a new eastern terminus at I-71 in the far northern end of Columbus. Ten years later, a new interchange was built for Gemini Place at I-71, north of SR 750. The interchange would relieve traffic in the area. The next year, SR 750's westernmost portion was re-routed to the south, onto an all-new alignment that brought its western terminus in line with the intersection of SR 257 and County Road 126 (Glick Road), after an expansion to the Columbus Zoo. In September 2013, a slope stabilization project began for SR 315, and turn lanes are currently being added for SR 315 and SR 750's intersection.

== Major intersections ==
The entire route is in Delaware County.

Location	mi	km	Destinations	Notes
Liberty Township	0.00	0.00	SR 257 (Riverside Drive)	Western terminus at signalized intersection.
Liberty Township	4.43	7.13	SR 315 (Olentangy River Road)	Signalized intersection.
Orange Township	5.88	9.46	US 23 (Columbus Pike)	Signalized intersection.
Columbus	9.67	15.56	I-71	Eastern terminus at Exit 121 off of I-71; No entrance from I-71 southbound, handled by Gemini Place. Road continues eastbound as Polaris Parkway.
1.000 mi = 1.609 km; 1.000 km = 0.621 mi: Incomplete access
