= Ohio State Route 257 =

State highway in central Ohio, US

State Route 257
- General Thaddeus Kosciusko Memorial Highway

Route information
- Maintained by ODOT
- Length: 26.19 mi (42.15 km)
- Existed: 1926–present

Major junctions
- South end: US 33 / SR 161 in Dublin
- US 42 / SR 745 near Delaware; US 36 near Delaware
- North end: SR 47 in Prospect

Location
- Country: United States
- State: Ohio
- Counties: Franklin, Delaware, Marion

Highway system
- Ohio State Highway System; Interstate; US; State; Scenic
← SR 256	→ SR 258

State Route 257 (SR 257, OH 257) is a 26.19-mile (42.15 km) north - south state highway in the central portion of the U.S. state of Ohio. The highway's southern terminus is in the northwestern Columbus suburb of Dublin at a roundabout intersection with U.S. Route 33 (US 33) and SR 161. This mainly two-lane highway follows the eastern side of the Scioto River from Dublin to its junction with US 42. After crossing over the river with the U.S. highway, SR 257 parallels the river's western bank. SR 257 has its northern terminus at a T-intersection with SR 47 on the western village limits of Prospect. SR 257 was created in 1926, and extended in 1935 and 1937.

== Route description ==
Traffic volume on State Route 257
County Log Point	Volume
0.06	17,100
0.842	24,450
0.112	18,470
1.25	15,870
3.194	6,970
7.75	2,530
8.478	8,110
12.728	6,180
14.35	1,560
22.618	720
0.486	720
County log points reset at county line; Volume: AADT; Source:

Along its way, SR 257 travels primarily north through northwestern Franklin County, western Delaware County and the extreme southern part of Marion County, following the Scioto River for most of the way.

SR 257 starts at the intersection of US 33 / SR 161 as a four-lane road. The route moves north intersecting with Emerald Parkway. SR 257 continues north to Hard Road, and past Thaddeus Kosciuszko Park. After crossing the Franklin–Delaware county line, the next major junction is with SR 750 at the Columbus Zoo and Aquarium and the O'Shaughnessy Dam. From here to US 42 the route follows the eastern bank of O'Shaughnessy Reservoir, transitioning to a two-lane back road. The next intersection is Seldom Seen Road. Two miles later, SR 257 meets Home Road at a traffic circle. Home Road provides access to SR 745 heading west and to Sawmill Parkway and Liberty Rd heading east.

SR 257 continues north to signaled intersection with US 42 and runs concurrently with US 42 for about 1 mile within Concord Township. The route travels southwest with US 42 across the Scioto River. At the signalized northern terminus of SR 745 the concurrency ends, as SR 257 turns north. SR 257 passes through the former communities of Bellpoint (Concord Township) and White Sulfur Springs Station (Scioto Township) on the way to intersecting with US 36 about 3.5 miles (5.6 km) north of US 42. Continuing north, SR 257 crosses SR 37 at a flashing red light. After nine miles, the route crosses into Marion County prior to ending at OH 47 in Prospect, crossing minor roads within Thompson Township in between.

== History ==
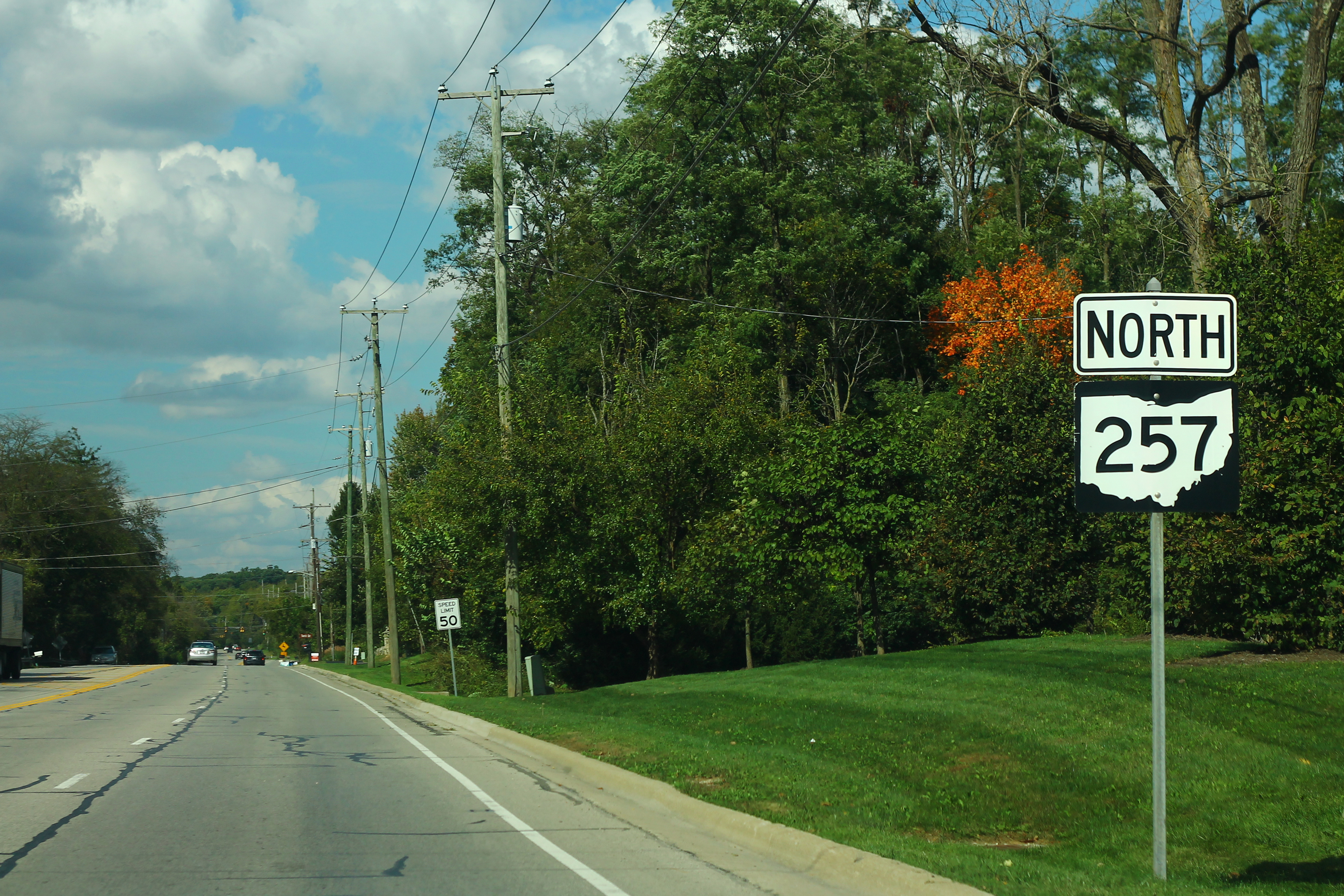
A sign denoting Ohio State Route 257 in Dublin.

The SR 257 designation was applied in 1926. Originally, the highway was routed along its present southernmost alignment along the eastern banks of the Scioto River between Dublin and its northeastern junction with US 42.

In 1935, SR 257 was extended via a short concurrency with US 42 across the Scioto River, then north along its present alignment along the western side of the river to a new northern terminus at SR 37 west of Delaware. Then, two years after its first northward extension, SR 257 was extended to the north again, this time to its present northern terminus at SR 47 in Prospect.

SR 257 was designated the General Thaddeus Kosciusko Memorial Highway in December 1975.

== Major intersections ==
County	Location	mi	km	Destinations	Notes
Franklin	Dublin	0.00	0.00	US 33 / SR 161	Southern terminus at signalized intersection
Delaware	Liberty Township	3.94	6.34	SR 750 east	Signalized intersection marking western terminus of SR 750
Delaware	Concord Township	10.72	17.25	US 42 north	Signalized intersection marking northeastern end of the US 42 concurrency
Delaware	Concord Township	11.29	18.17	US 42 south / SR 745 south	Signalized intersection marking southwestern end of the US 42 concurrency; northern terminus of SR 745
Delaware	Scioto Township	14.75	23.74	US 36	
Delaware	Scioto Township	17.18	27.65	SR 37	
Marion	Prospect	26.19	42.15	SR 47	Northern terminus at T-intersection
1.000 mi = 1.609 km; 1.000 km = 0.621 mi: Concurrency terminus
