= Perry Township, Franklin County, Ohio =

Township in Ohio, US

- Township
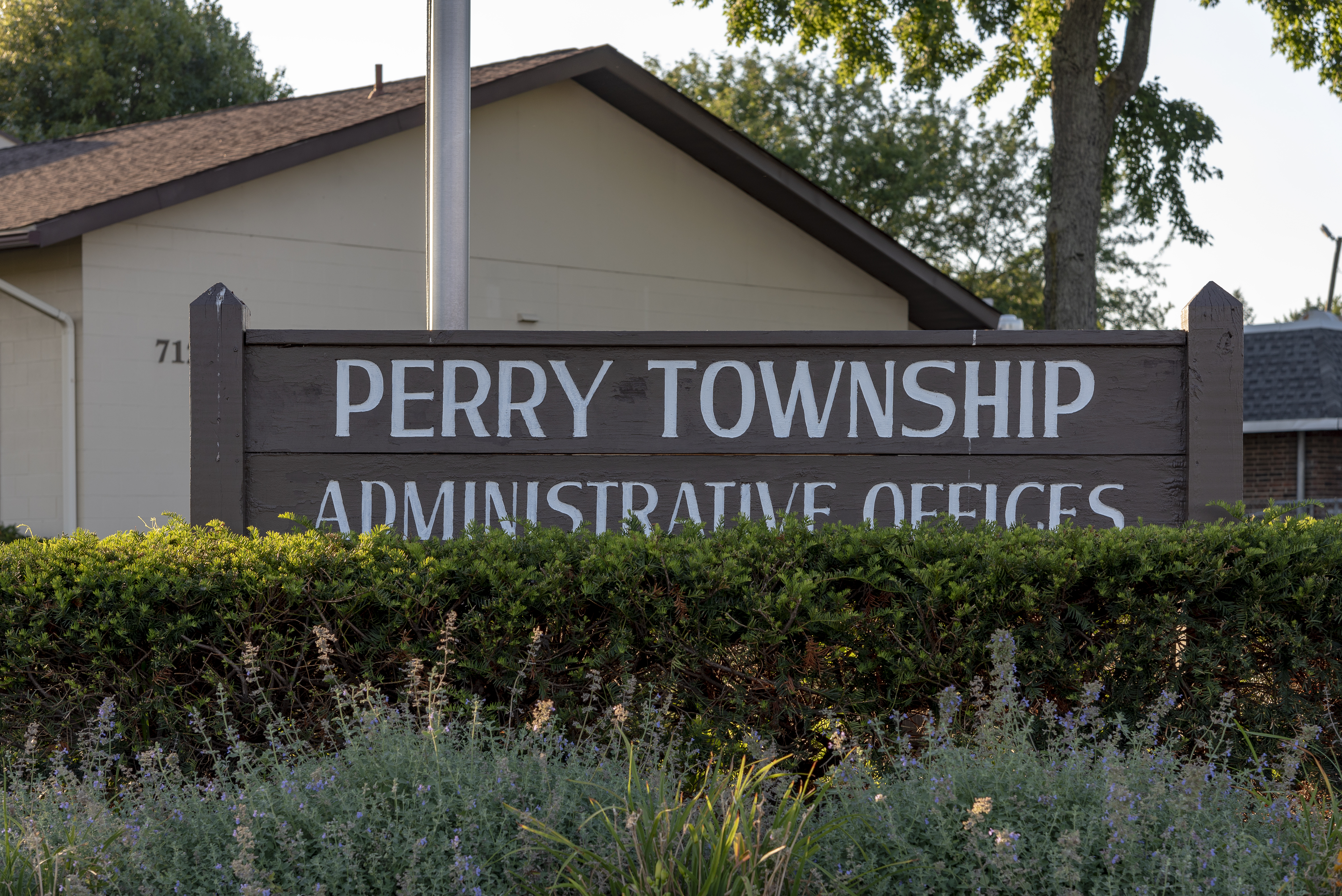
- Sign for Township administrative offices

- Location of Perry Township in Franklin County.
- Coordinates: 40°5′30″N 83°4′14″W
- Country: United States
- State: Ohio
- County: Franklin

Area
  - Total: 2.2 sq mi (5.7 km^{2})
  - Land: 2.2 sq mi (5.7 km^{2})
  - Water: 0 sq mi (0 km^{2})
- Elevation: 896 ft (273 m)

Population (2020)
  - Total: 3,929
  - Density: 1,800/sq mi (690/km^{2})
- Time zone: UTC-5 (Eastern (EST))
  - Summer (DST): UTC-4 (EDT)
- FIPS code: 39-61840
- GNIS feature ID: 1086110

Perry Township is one of the seventeen townships of Franklin County, Ohio, United States. The 2020 census found 3,929 people in the township.

== Geography ==
Most of Perry Township is now part of one of these four cities:

- Columbus, the county seat of Franklin County, in the center
- Dublin, in the northwest
- Upper Arlington, in the southwest
- Worthington, in the east

Today, the township is composed of many small "islands," all of which are surrounded by the city of Columbus, except for three: the farthest south "island", which borders Upper Arlington to the south; the largest "island" in the center of the original township, which borders Worthington to the east; and the most northerly "island", which borders three other townships:

- Liberty Township, Delaware County - north
- Orange Township, Delaware County - northeast corner
- Sharon Township - east

== Name and history ==
It is one of twenty-six Perry Townships statewide.

Perry Township was established in 1820.

== Government ==
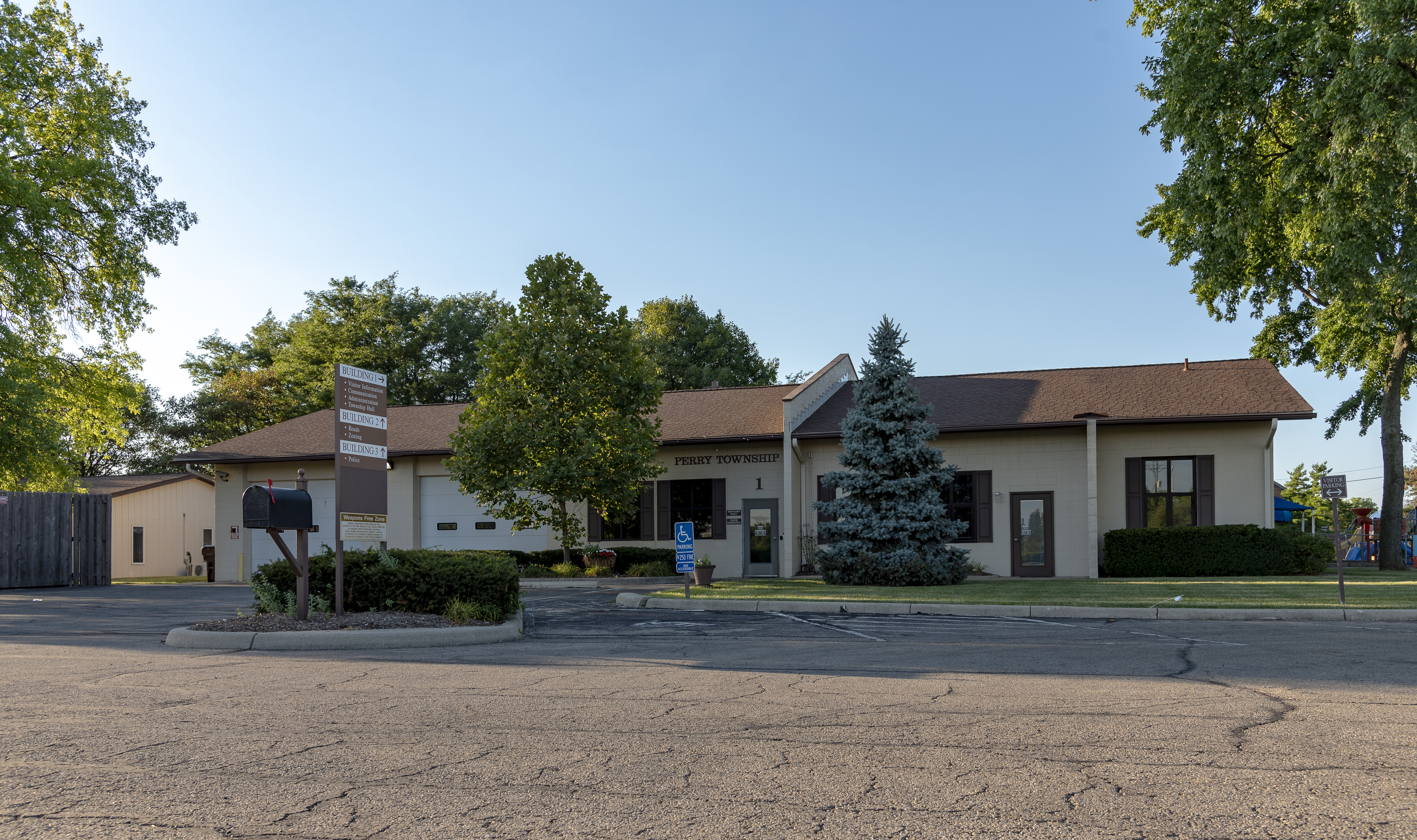
Perry Township Hall

The township is governed by a three-member board of trustees, who are elected in November of odd-numbered years to a four-year term beginning on the following January 1. Two are elected in the year after the presidential election and one is elected in the year before it. There is also an elected township fiscal officer, who serves a four-year term beginning on April 1 of the year after the election, which is held in November of the year before the presidential election. Vacancies in the fiscal officership or on the board of trustees are filled by the remaining trustees.

The trustees appoint a Township Administrator who administers the day-to-day activities of the township government.

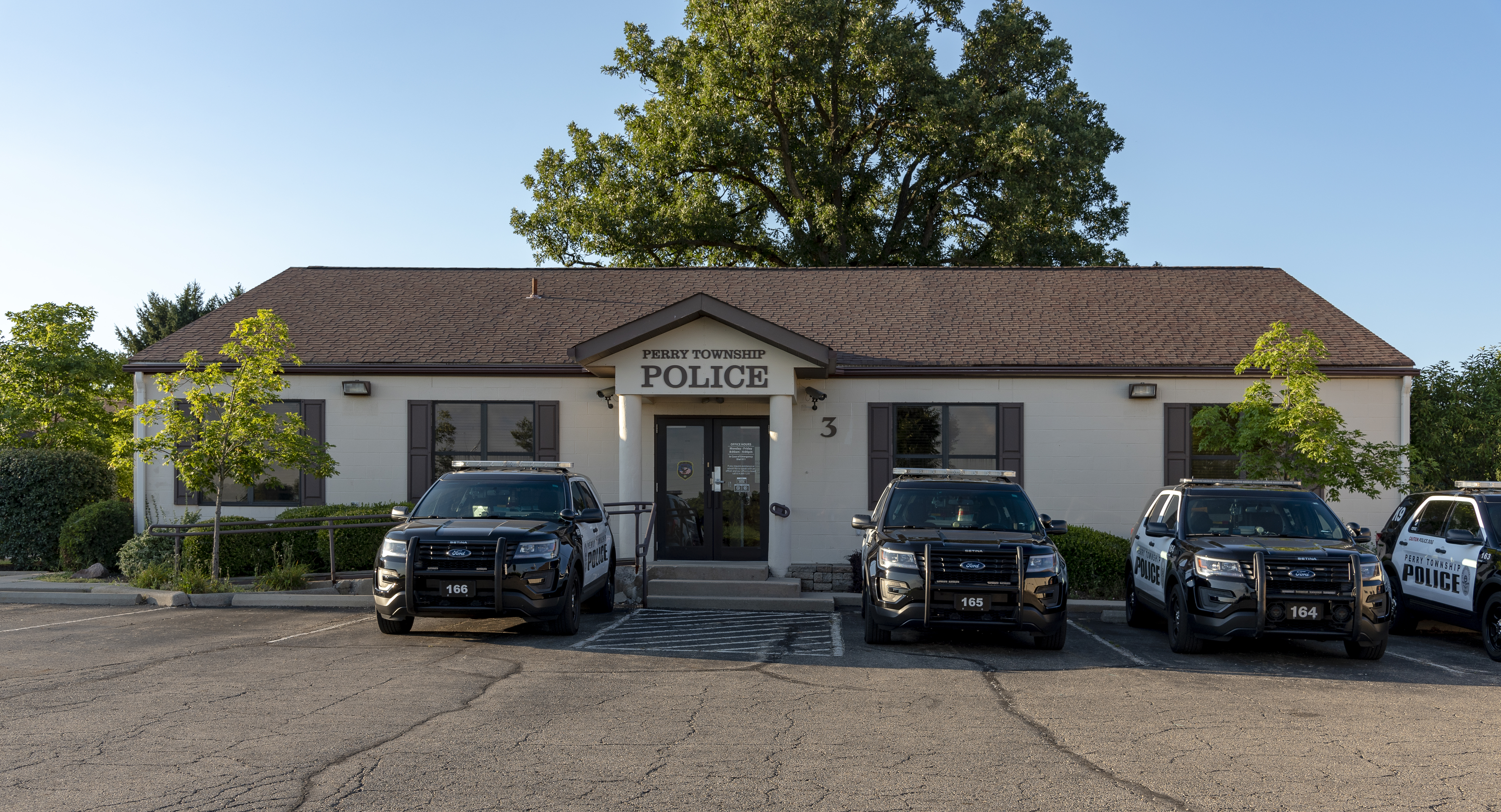
Perry Township Police Headquarters
