= Bellepoint, Ohio =

Unincorporated community in the US

Coordinates: 40°14′50″N 83°9′7″W

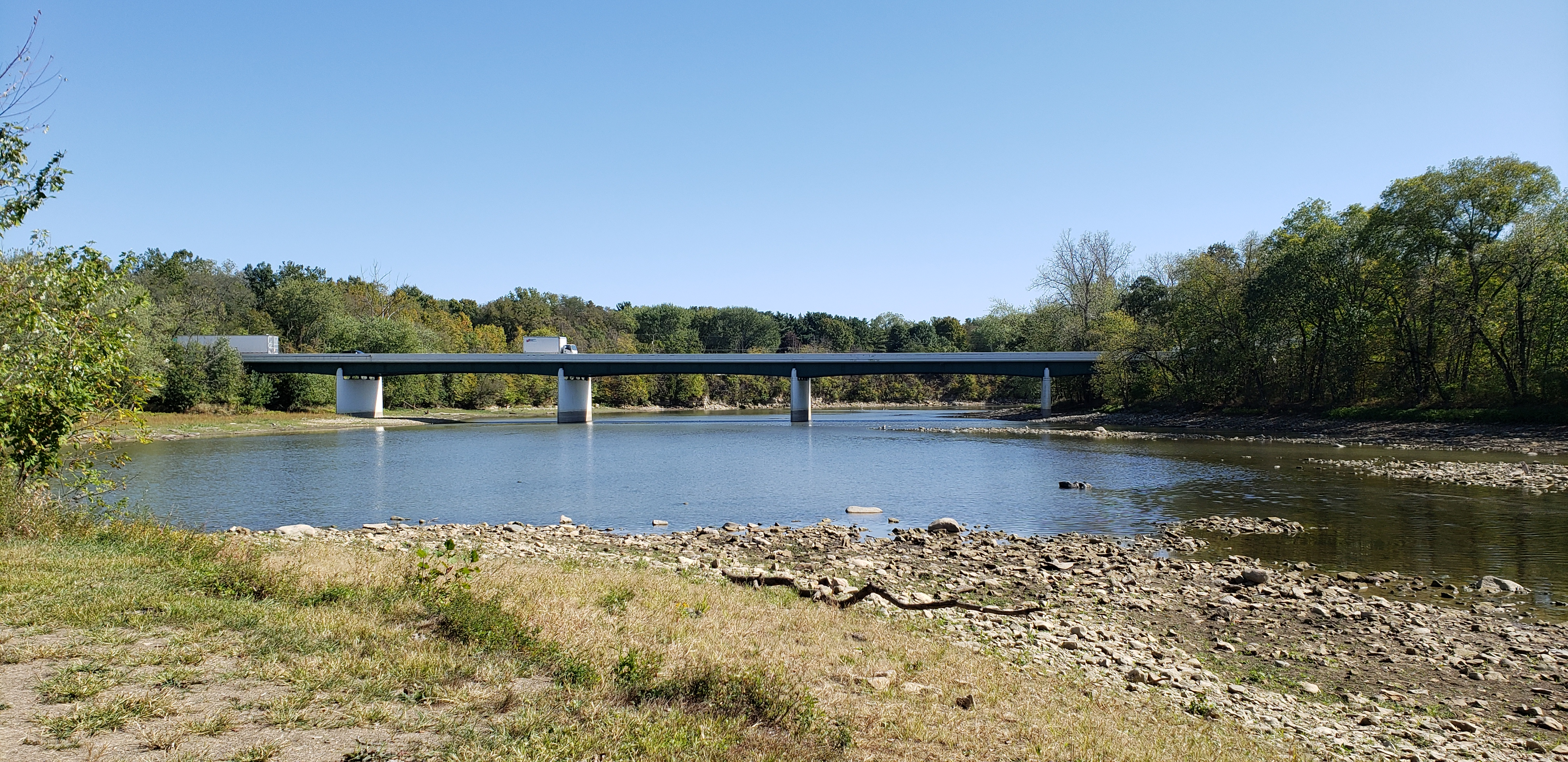
The confluence of Scioto River and Mill Creek at The Point in Bellpoint, Ohio, facing southwards towards U.S. Highway 42 and Ohio State Route 257

Bellpoint is an unincorporated community in Delaware County, in the U.S. state of Ohio.

== History ==
Bellpoint was laid out in 1835. According to tradition, the community was named for the fact the town site is located on a point shaped like a bell. A post office called Belle Point was established in 1837; the name was changed to Bellpoint in 1893, and the post office closed in 1907.
