= Carpenter's Mill, Ohio =

Coordinates: 40°13′50″N 83°03′45″W

Carpenter's Mill is a ghost town in Liberty Township, Delaware County, Ohio, United States, which developed around a mill constructed ca. 1805 on the Whetstone River (now the Olentangy River). It was designated an official Post Office in 1832, but it was discontinued in 1837.
