= Griggs Dam =

Coordinates: 40°00′58″N 83°05′38″W

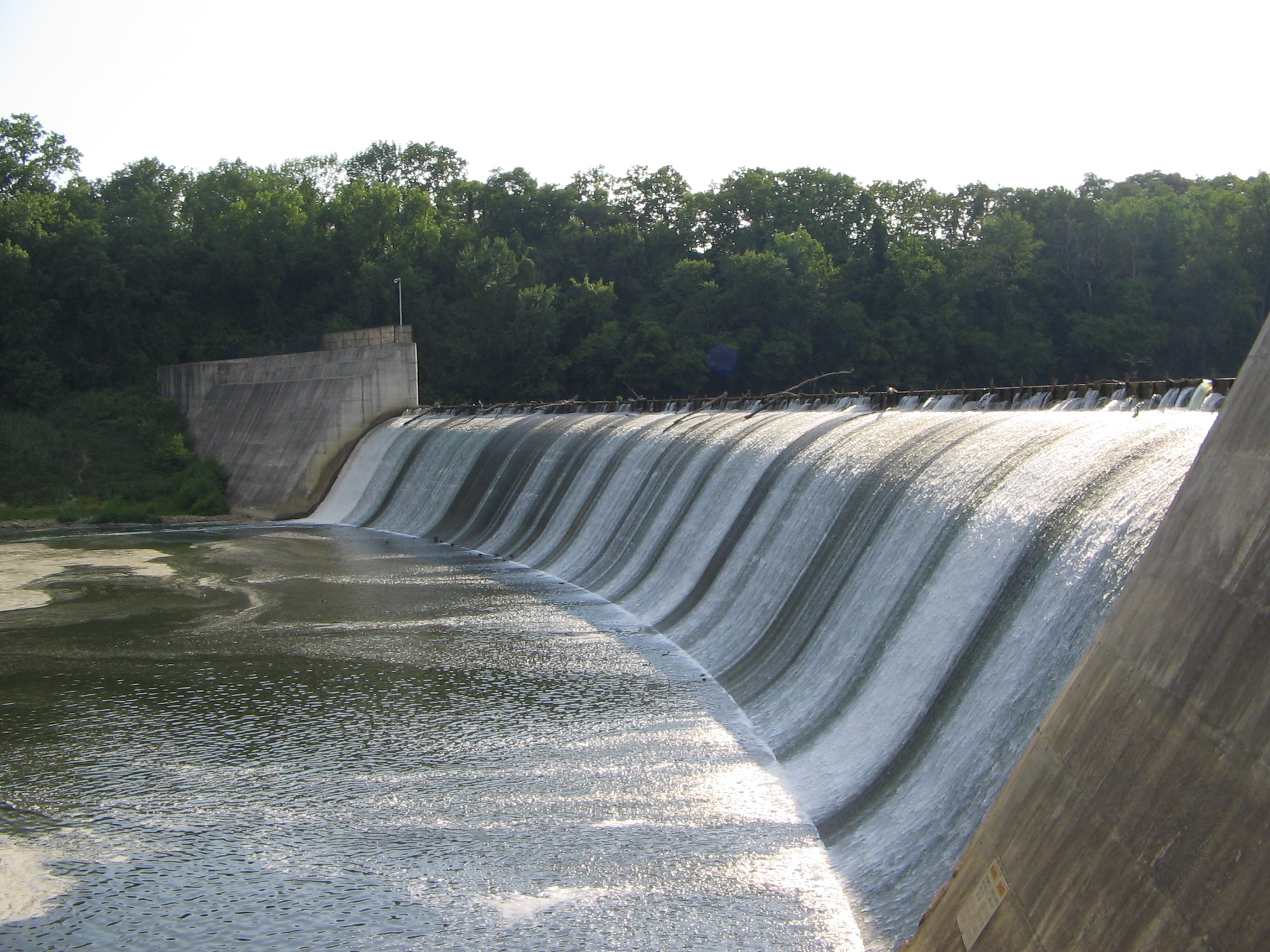
- Interactive map of Griggs Dam
- Country: United States
- Location: Franklin County, Ohio
- Status: Operational
- Construction cost: $700,000

Griggs Dam is located within the Columbus, Ohio city limits, on the Scioto River near Upper Arlington, Ohio, in Franklin County. The dam forms Griggs Reservoir, which is a major source of drinking water for the city of Columbus. Named after the city's chief engineer, Julian Griggs, the dam was completed in 1905 at a cost of $700,000 and was the first major reservoir in the Columbus area. For 20 years, it served as the only reservoir serving the city of Columbus' drinking water needs. Griggs Dam is a gravity dam with a 500-foot-long (150 m) curved concrete spillway. Its height is only 35 feet (11 m), but it forms a reservoir almost 6 miles (9.7 km) long with a 1,200,000,000-US-gallon (4.5×10^{9} L) capacity. US Route 33 runs along the East side of the dam, providing access to the dam and recreation area on both the upstream and downstream sides of the dam.

Approximately 10 miles (16 km) upstream of Griggs Dam is the slightly larger O'Shaughnessy Dam, which is also owned and operated by the city of Columbus. Together, the two reservoirs have a capacity of 8 billion US gallons (30,000,000 m^{3}). Due to the arrangement of the two dams' reservoirs, Griggs reservoir is often able to be kept full during the dry summer months by first releasing water from O'Shaughnessy reservoir during times of need. By only using Griggs reservoir's capacity during times of extreme need when O'Shaughnessy is at its minimum pool level, Columbus residents are able to use the full acreage of the reservoir for recreation during the summer.
