= Interstate 670 (Ohio) =

Highway in Ohio

Interstate 670
- I-670 highlighted in red

Route information
- Auxiliary route of I-70
- Maintained by ODOT
- Length: 10.43 mi (16.79 km)
- Existed: 1975 (by FHWA), 1976 (by ODOT),, signed 1995, completed 2003–present
- NHS: Entire route

Major junctions
- West end: I-70 in Columbus
- US 33 in Columbus; US 23 in Columbus; I-71 in Columbus
- East end: I-270 / US 62 near Gahanna

Location
- Country: United States
- State: Ohio
- Counties: Franklin

Highway system
- Interstate Highway System; Main; Auxiliary; Suffixed; Business; Future; Ohio State Highway System; Interstate; US; State; Scenic
← SR 669	→ SR 670

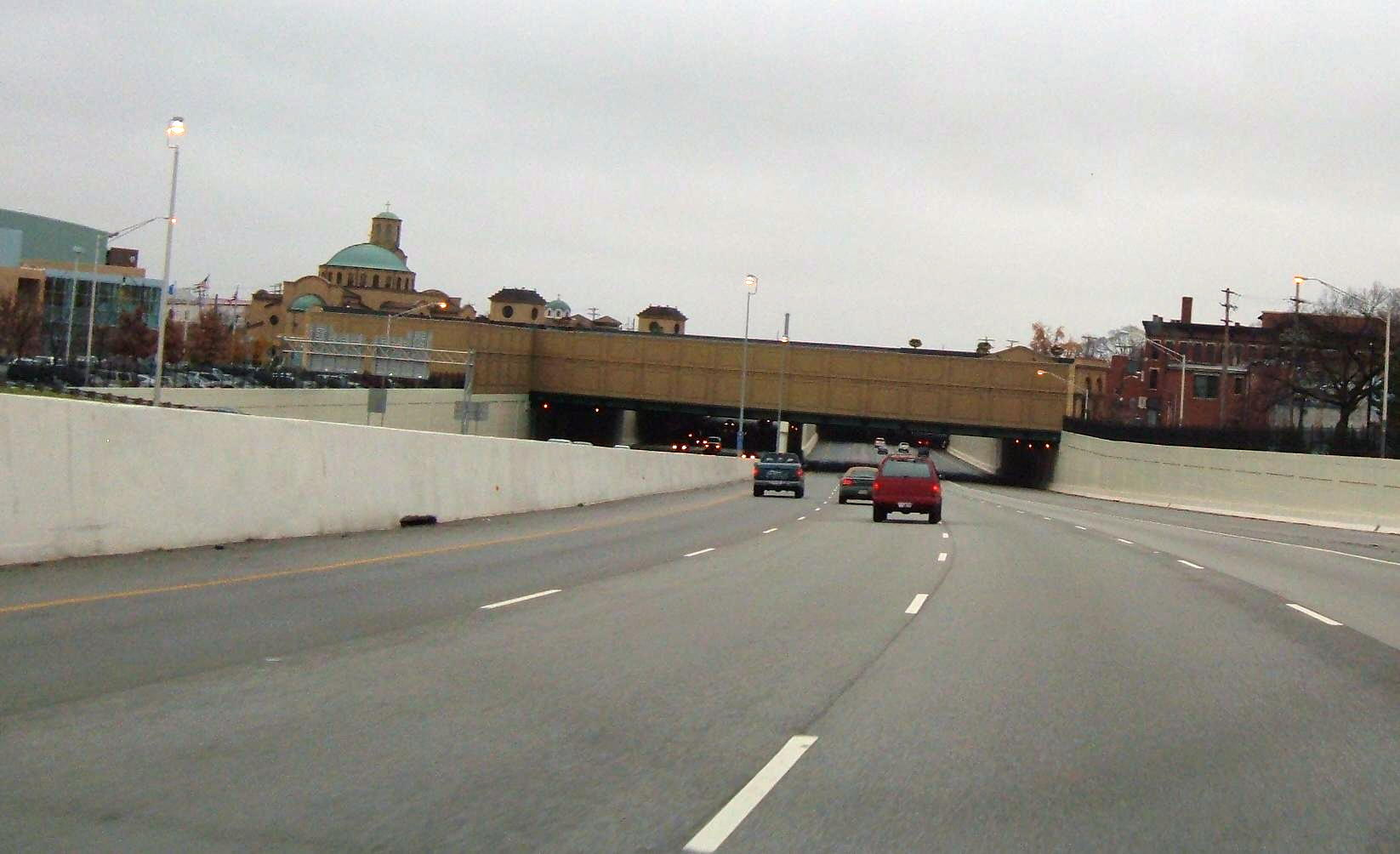
View westbound at High Street

Interstate 670 (I-670) is an Interstate Highway in the US state of Ohio that passes through Columbus connecting I-70 west of Downtown Columbus with I-270 and U.S. Route 62 (US 62) near the eastern suburb of Gahanna. I-670 provides access to John Glenn Columbus International Airport and intersects State Route 315 (SR 315) and I-71 downtown. The section between SR 315 and I-71 is commonly referred to by locals as the "North Innerbelt"; the rest of the Innerbelt consists of SR 315 (west), I-70 (south), and I-71 (east and south).

== History ==
In the late 1970s, the Ohio Department of Transportation (ODOT) was unable to complete the Spring–Sandusky streets interchange, linking both sections of the highway, due to budget shortfalls and environmental regulations, leaving I-670 the only uncompleted Interstate in Ohio. Two decades passed before work began on the last remaining section, bridging the gap between the two completed sections. Work on this section also included the High Street cap, a cut-and-cover bridge over the highway featuring shops and restaurants. I-670 was finally completed in 2003.

In June 2018, a $60-million (equivalent to $73.6 million in 2024) construction project began on an active traffic management system known as SmartLane. The system, running between I-71 and I-270, repurposed a shoulder lane and installed digital overhead signs that would inform motorists when the lane would open and the current speed limit to help reduce congestion. In addition, the interchange with I-270 was reconfigured. The management system opened to traffic in October 2019.

== Route description ==
West of I-71, I-670 passes around both sides of Fort Hayes with two two-way roadways. The south roadway carries the eastbound main lanes and the westbound entrance ramps from I-71 north and SR 3 (Cleveland Avenue), while the north roadway carries the westbound main lanes and the eastbound entrance from US 23 north (4th Street) and High Street.

== Exit list ==
The entire route is in Franklin County.

Location	mi	km	Exit	Destinations	Notes
Columbus	0.00	0.00		I-70 west – Dayton	Western terminus; I-70 exit 96 eastbound
Columbus	0.46	0.74	1A	US 33 west (Lower Scioto Greenway)	Westbound exit and eastbound entrance
Columbus	0.95	1.53	1B	Grandview Avenue (CR 73)	Signed as exit 1 eastbound
Columbus	2.24	3.60	2A	US 33 (Dublin Road) / SR 315 south	Eastbound exit and westbound entrance; connection to SR 315 ramps via traffic signals and (for NB-WB traffic) a short stretch of US 33
Columbus	2.42	3.89	2A	SR 315 south	Westbound exit and eastbound entrance
Columbus	2.43	3.91	2B	SR 315 north	
Columbus	3.14	5.05	3	CR 578 (Neil Avenue) / Goodale Street	Goodale Street not signed eastbound, access to Huntington Park & ScottsMiracle-Gro Field
Columbus	3.52– 3.95	5.66– 6.36	4	US 23 (Third Street / Fourth Street) / High Street – Convention Center & Nationwide Arena	Signed as exits 4A (south) and 4B (north) eastbound, 4A (north) and 4B (south) westbound; High Street not signed eastbound
Columbus	4.33	6.97	4C	SR 3 (Cleveland Avenue) / Leonard Avenue (CR 23)	Westbound exit is part of exit 5
Columbus	4.58– 4.76	7.37– 7.66	5	Spring Street – Downtown	Westbound exit and eastbound entrance
Columbus	4.58– 4.76	7.37– 7.66	5	I-71 – Cleveland, Cincinnati	Signed as exits 5A (south) and 5B (north) eastbound; I-71 exit 109A southbound, 109A-B northbound.
Columbus	6.44	10.36	6	Leonard Avenue (CR 23)	
Columbus	7.56	12.17	7	US 62 west (5th Avenue)	West end of US 62 overlap
Mifflin Township	8.50– 9.06	13.68– 14.58	9	Stelzer Road (CR 177) / Johnstown Road (CR 377) / Cassady Avenue (CR 96) – Airport	Johnstown Road not signed westbound; Cassady Road not signed eastbound
Mifflin Township	10.43	16.79	10	I-270 – Cleveland, Wheeling US 62 east – Gahanna	Eastern terminus; east end of US 62 overlap; I-270 exit 35 northbound, 35A southbound; roadway continues as US 62
1.000 mi = 1.609 km; 1.000 km = 0.621 mi: Concurrency terminus; Incomplete access
