= Dublin, Ohio =

City in Ohio, United States

- City
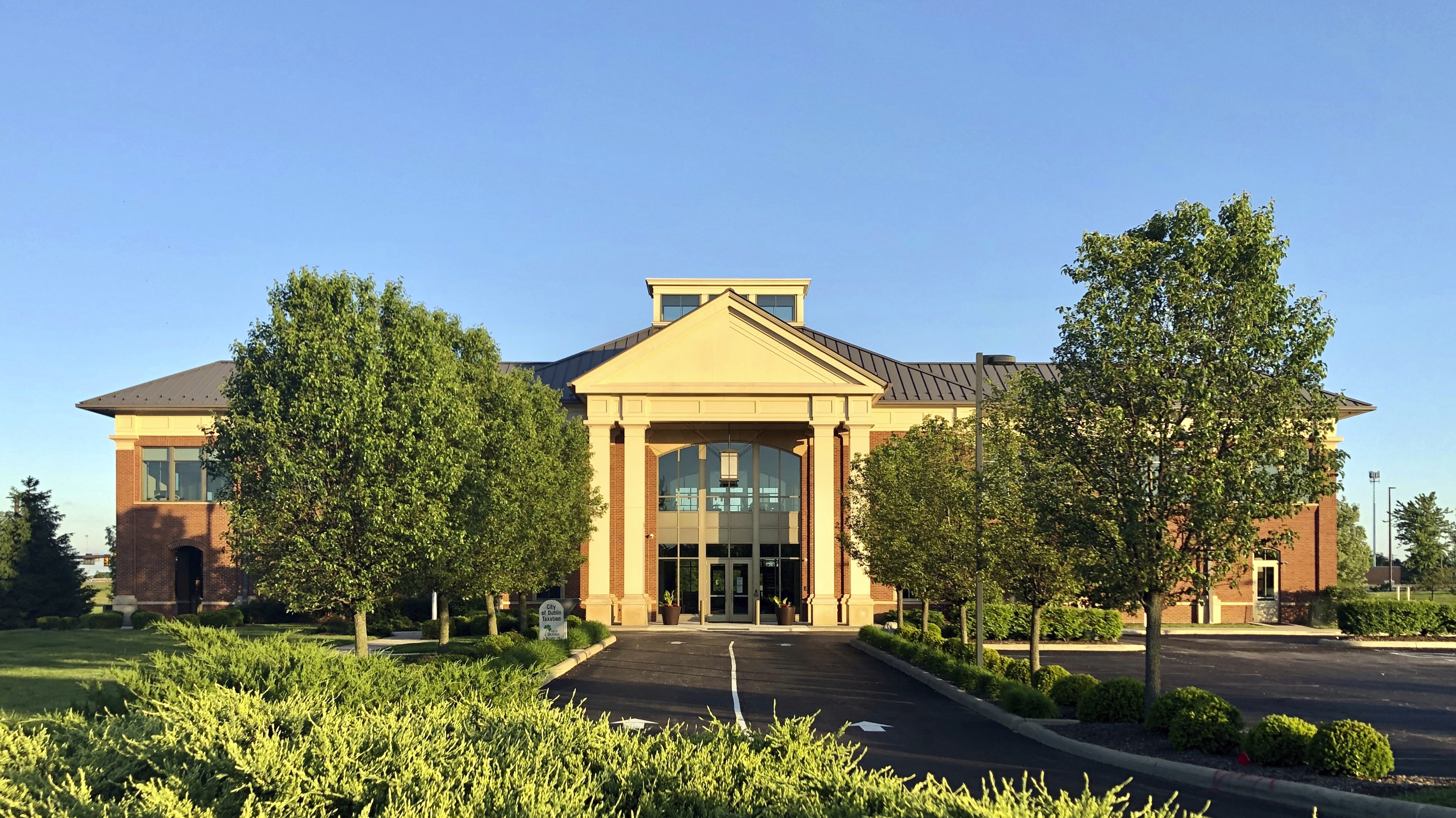
- Dublin City Hall

- Flag Seal Logo
- Motto: "Where Yesterday Meets Tomorrow"
- Interactive map of Dublin, Ohio
- Location within Ohio Location within the United States
- Coordinates: 40°6′33″N 83°8′25″W
- Country: United States
- State: Ohio
- Counties: Franklin, Delaware, Union, Madison
- City status: 1987

Area
  - Total: 25.04 sq mi (64.85 km^{2})
  - Land: 24.68 sq mi (63.92 km^{2})
  - Water: 0.36 sq mi (0.93 km^{2}) 1.45%
- Elevation: 902 ft (275 m)

Population (2020)
  - Total: 49,328
  - Estimate (2023): 48,923
  - Density: 1,998.6/sq mi (771.67/km^{2})
- Time zone: UTC−5 (Eastern)
  - Summer (DST): UTC−4 (Eastern)
- ZIP Codes: 43016–43017
- Area codes: 614 and 380
- FIPS code: 39-22694
- GNIS feature ID: 2394565
- Website: dublinohiousa.gov

Dublin is a city in the U.S. state of Ohio. A suburb of Columbus, it falls within the jurisdictions of Franklin, Delaware, Union, and Madison counties. The population was 49,328 at the 2020 census. The Dublin Irish Festival advertises itself as the largest three-day Irish festival in the world.

== History ==
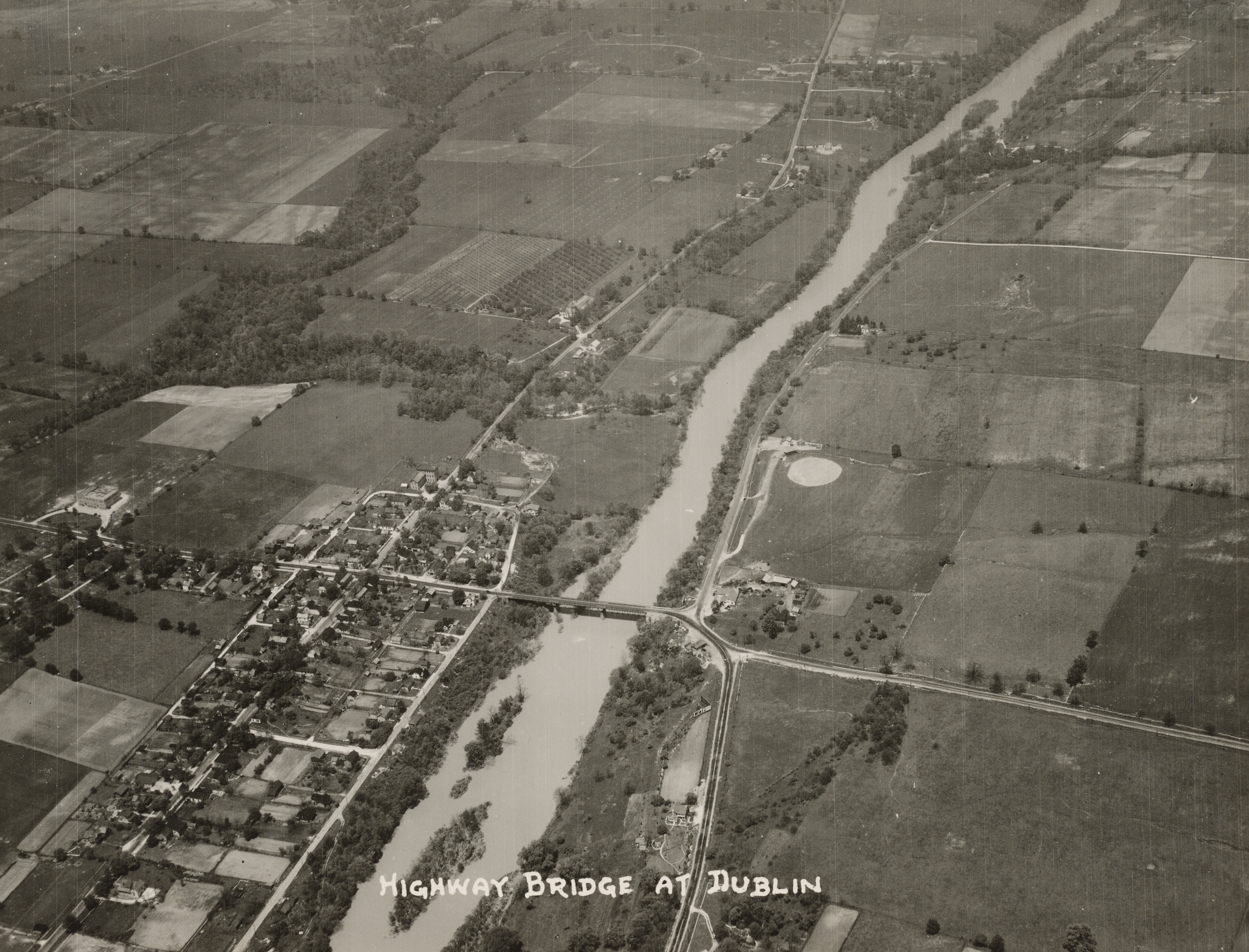
Aerial view of Dublin in May 1929

=== Native Americans ===
Native Americans from the Hopewell, Adena, Delaware, Shawnee, and Wyandot were among the first known inhabitants of the countryside that was to become Dublin, Ohio.

The Wyandot had moved to the Ohio countryside after being decimated by disease and a disastrous war with the Five Nations of the Iroquois in their homeland near Georgian Bay. In 1794, General Anthony Wayne defeated the Wyandot and other Ohio American Indian peoples at the Battle of Fallen Timbers, leading to the Wyandot surrendering most of their land in Ohio with the signing of the Treaty of Greenville.

Chief Shateyaronyah, an important leader known to locals as "Leatherlips", had signed the Treaty of Greenville on August 3, 1795, and encouraged cooperation with white settlers near the end of his life. That policy of accommodating Europeans led to conflict with a movement led by two Shawnee brothers, Tecumseh and Tenskwatawa (The Prophet). Tenskwatawa reacted strongly against Leatherlips and condemned him to death for "witchcraft" and signing away native lands. More likely was that this was for his refusal to join the Shawnee. Rather than break the pledge that he signed in 1795, Leatherlips was killed in 1810. The Leatherlips sculpture in Scioto Park was created to honor Chief Shateyaronyah in 1990.

After the Revolutionary War, the United States Government gave 2,000 acres (810 ha) of land along the Scioto River to Lieutenant James Holt as payment for his service. In 1802, Peter and Benjamin Sells from Huntingdon, Pennsylvania, purchased 400 acres (160 ha) of this land for their brother, John. The site of the John Sells' original purchase is known as Historic Dublin.

=== Post-Ohio statehood ===
In 1808, John Sells brought his family to the region, and by 1810, he had begun to survey lots for the new village with his business partner, an Irishman named John Shields, who named the town after his birthplace:

"If I have the honor conferred upon me to name your village, with the brightness of the morn, and the beaming of the sun on the hills and dales surrounding this beautiful valley, it would give me great pleasure to name your new town after my birthplace, Dublin, Ireland."

In 1833, Dublin contained several mills and one store. The town was incorporated in 1881.

In 1970, Dublin was still a small town with only 681 residents. However, the construction of Interstate 270 facilitated a population boom, spearheaded by the acquisition of major corporate headquarters such as Ashland Inc and Wendy's International. In addition, the growth of the Muirfield Village Golf Club and its residential subdivision attracted people to the rapidly growing suburb. It was then officially declared a city in August 1987, after reaching a population of 5,000 residents. As part of this boom Dublin significantly expanded its area, annexing parts of Washington, Perry, Concord, and Jerome townships.

In 2020, the city began redeveloping the Bridge Street District. The 1,100-acre (450 ha) project includes 400 apartments and condominiums, retail, offices, and other space along the Scioto River. During a survey for the new Wexner Medical Center, an African-American cemetery was discovered. In 2024, the city held a dedication ceremony which included local resident descendants of some of the more than 20 people who are buried there.

== Geography ==
According to the United States Census Bureau, the city has a total area of 24.80 square miles (64.23 km^{2}), of which 24.44 square miles (63.30 km^{2}) is land and 0.36 square miles (0.93 km^{2}) is water.

The Scioto River passes through Dublin. In this area the river and its tributaries cut deep gorges through the limestone bedrock, and the riverbed is stony. Some of these tributaries feature waterfalls.

=== Topography ===
Located on the Glaciated Allegheny Plateau, Dublin has a relatively flat topography. Nevertheless, there are numerous ravines surrounding the tributaries of the Scioto River, which make for steep cliffs in some areas. Elevations range from 780 feet (240 m) above sea level where the Scioto River leaves the city at Hayden Run Road, while the high point is 1,000 feet (300 m) at Glacier Ridge Metro Park.

== Demographics ==
=== Racial and ethnic composition ===
Dublin, Ohio – Racial and ethnic composition Note: the US Census treats Hispanic/Latino as an ethnic category. This table excludes Latinos from the racial categories and assigns them to a separate category. Hispanics/Latinos may be of any race.
Race / Ethnicity (NH = Non-Hispanic)	Pop 2000	Pop 2010	Pop 2020	% 2000	% 2010	% 2020
White alone (NH)	27,901	33,089	34,828	88.88%	79.25%	70.60%
Black or African American alone (NH)	527	722	948	1.68%	1.73%	1.92%
Native American or Alaska Native alone (NH)	23	22	47	0.07%	0.05%	0.10%
Asian alone (NH)	2,311	6,370	10,047	7.36%	15.26%	20.37%
Native Hawaiian or Pacific Islander alone (NH)	6	12	12	0.02%	0.03%	0.02%
Other race alone (NH)	19	60	145	0.06%	0.14%	0.29%
Mixed race or Multiracial (NH)	288	712	1,876	0.92%	1.71%	3.80%
Hispanic or Latino (any race)	317	764	1,425	1.01%	1.83%	2.89%
Total	31,392	41,751	49,328	100.00%	100.00%	100.00%

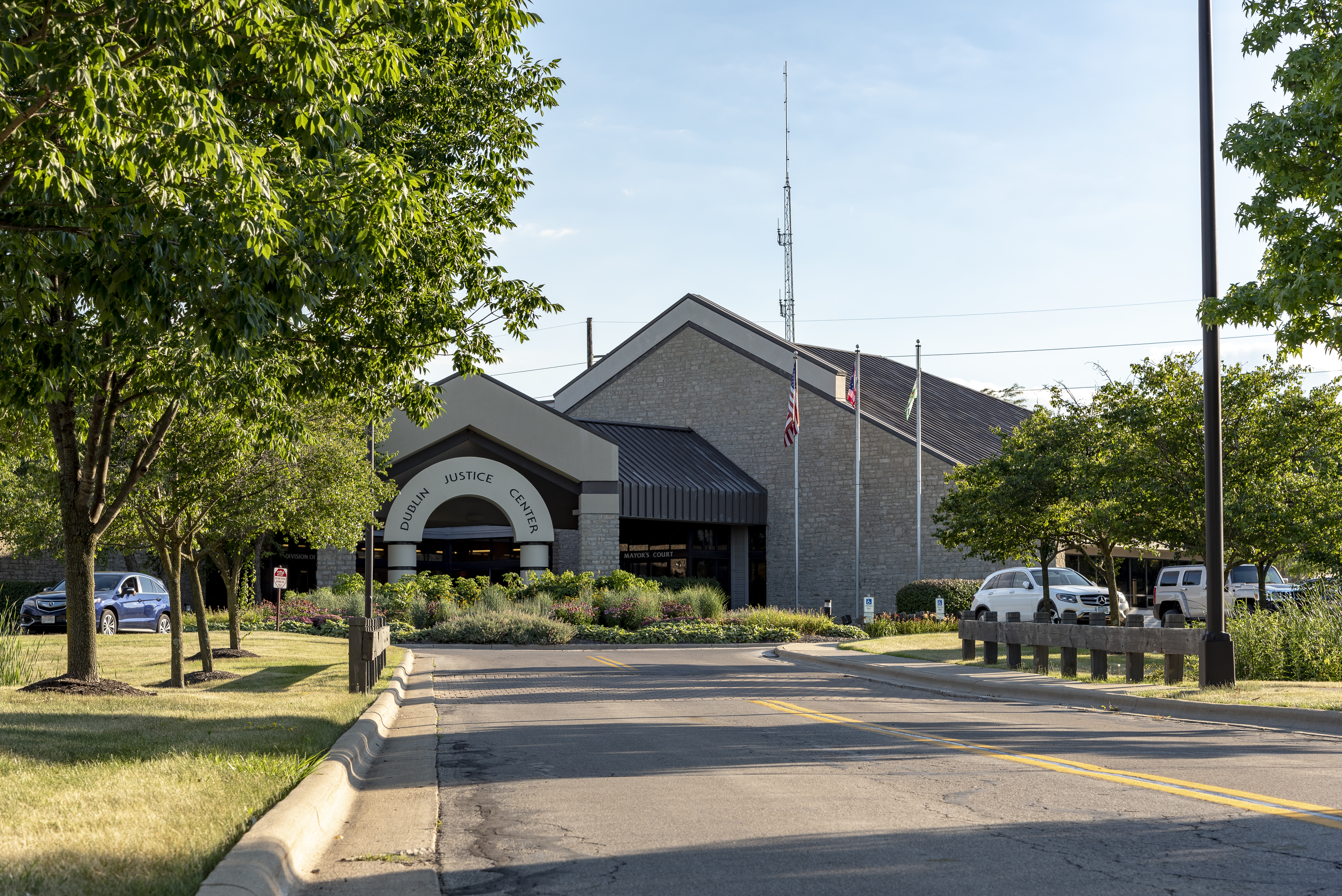
Headquarters of the Dublin Police Department

Historical population
Census	Pop.	Note	%±
1850	274		—
1880	314		—
1890	296		−5.7%
1900	275		−7.1%
1910	239		−13.1%
1920	211		−11.7%
1930	224		6.2%
1940	237		5.8%
1950	289		21.9%
1960	552		91.0%
1970	681		23.4%
1980	3,855		466.1%
1990	16,366		324.5%
2000	31,392		91.8%
2010	41,751		33.0%
2020	49,328		18.1%
2025 (est.)	49,094		−0.5%
US Census

According to a 2012 estimate, the median income for a household in the city was $114,183, and the median income for a family was $138,590. Males had a median income of $75,279 versus $43,903 for females. The per capita income for the city was $41,122. About 2.1% of families and 2.7% of the population were below the poverty line, including 2.7% of those under age 18 and 4.0% of those age 65 or over.

=== 2020 census ===
As of the 2020 census, Dublin had a population of 49,328. The median age was 40.6 years. 27.0% of residents were under the age of 18 and 14.6% of residents were 65 years of age or older. For every 100 females there were 97.0 males, and for every 100 females age 18 and over there were 93.6 males age 18 and over.

100.0% of residents lived in urban areas, while 0.0% lived in rural areas.

There were 17,435 households in Dublin, of which 41.9% had children under the age of 18 living in them. Of all households, 69.0% were married-couple households, 10.9% were households with a male householder and no spouse or partner present, and 16.9% were households with a female householder and no spouse or partner present. About 19.3% of all households were made up of individuals and 7.8% had someone living alone who was 65 years of age or older.

There were 18,261 housing units, of which 4.5% were vacant. The homeowner vacancy rate was 1.2% and the rental vacancy rate was 7.9%.

Racial composition as of the 2020 census
Race	Number	Percent
White	35,168	71.3%
Black or African American	963	2.0%
American Indian and Alaska Native	64	0.1%
Asian	10,056	20.4%
Native Hawaiian and Other Pacific Islander	14	0.0%
Some other race	396	0.8%
Two or more races	2,667	5.4%
Hispanic or Latino (of any race)	1,425	2.9%

=== 2010 census ===
As of the census of 2010, there were 41,751 people, 14,984 households, and 11,656 families residing in the city. The population density was 1,708.3 inhabitants per square mile (659.6/km^{2}). There were 15,779 housing units at an average density of 645.6 per square mile (249.3/km^{2}). The racial makeup of the city was 80.5% White, 1.8% African American, 0.1% Native American, 15.3% Asian, 0.5% from other races, and 1.8% from two or more races. Hispanic or Latino of any race were 1.8% of the population.

As of 2010, the Asian population is: 6.9% Indian, 3.1% Chinese, 2.6% Japanese, 1.3% Korean, 0.2% Vietnamese, and 85.9% other

There were 14,984 households, of which 45.1% had children under the age of 18 living with them, 69.5% were married couples living together, 5.9% had a female householder with no husband present, 2.4% had a male householder with no wife present, and 22.2% were non-families. 18.4% of all households were made up of individuals, and 5.4% had someone living alone who was 65 years of age or older. The average household size was 2.78 and the average family size was 3.21.

The median age in the city was 38.3 years. 30.4% of residents were under the age of 18; 4.8% were between the ages of 18 and 24; 27.3% were from 25 to 44; 29.7% were from 45 to 64, and 7.8% were 65 years of age or older. The gender makeup of the city was 49.4% male and 50.6% female.

=== 2000 census ===
As of the census of 2000, there were 31,392 people, 11,209 households, and 8,675 families residing in the city. The population density was 1,486.1 inhabitants per square mile (573.8/km^{2}). There were 12,038 housing units at an average density of 569.9 per square mile (220.0/km^{2}). The racial makeup of the city was 89.66% White, 1.73% African American, 0.08% Native American, 7.36% Asian, 0.02% Pacific Islander, 0.20% from other races, and 0.95% from two or more races. Hispanic or Latino of any race were 1.01% of the population.

There were 11,209 households, out of which 46.6% had children under the age of 18 living with them, 70.7% were married couples living together, 5.0% had a female householder with no husband present, and 22.6% were non-families. 18.5% of all households were made up of individuals, and 3.8% had someone living alone who was 65 years of age or older. The average household size was 2.80 and the average family size was 3.24.

In the city, the population was spread out, with 32.1% under the age of 18, 4.8% from 18 to 24, 33.4% from 25 to 44, 24.3% from 45 to 64, and 5.4% who were 65 years of age or older. The median age was 35 years. For every 100 females, there were 98.1 males. For every 100 females age 18 and over, there were 96.4 males age 18 and over.

== Economy ==
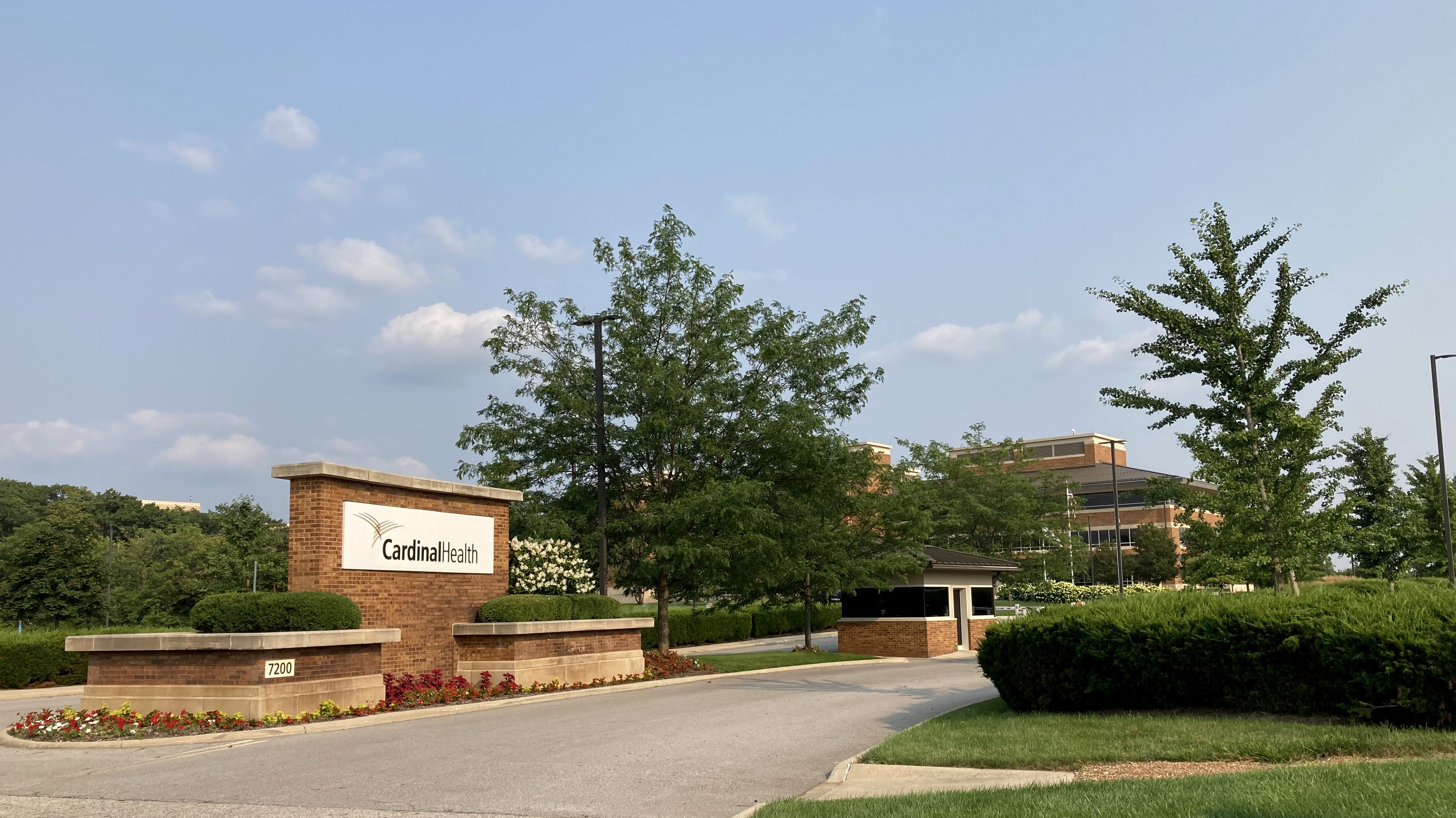
Cardinal Health corporate headquarters

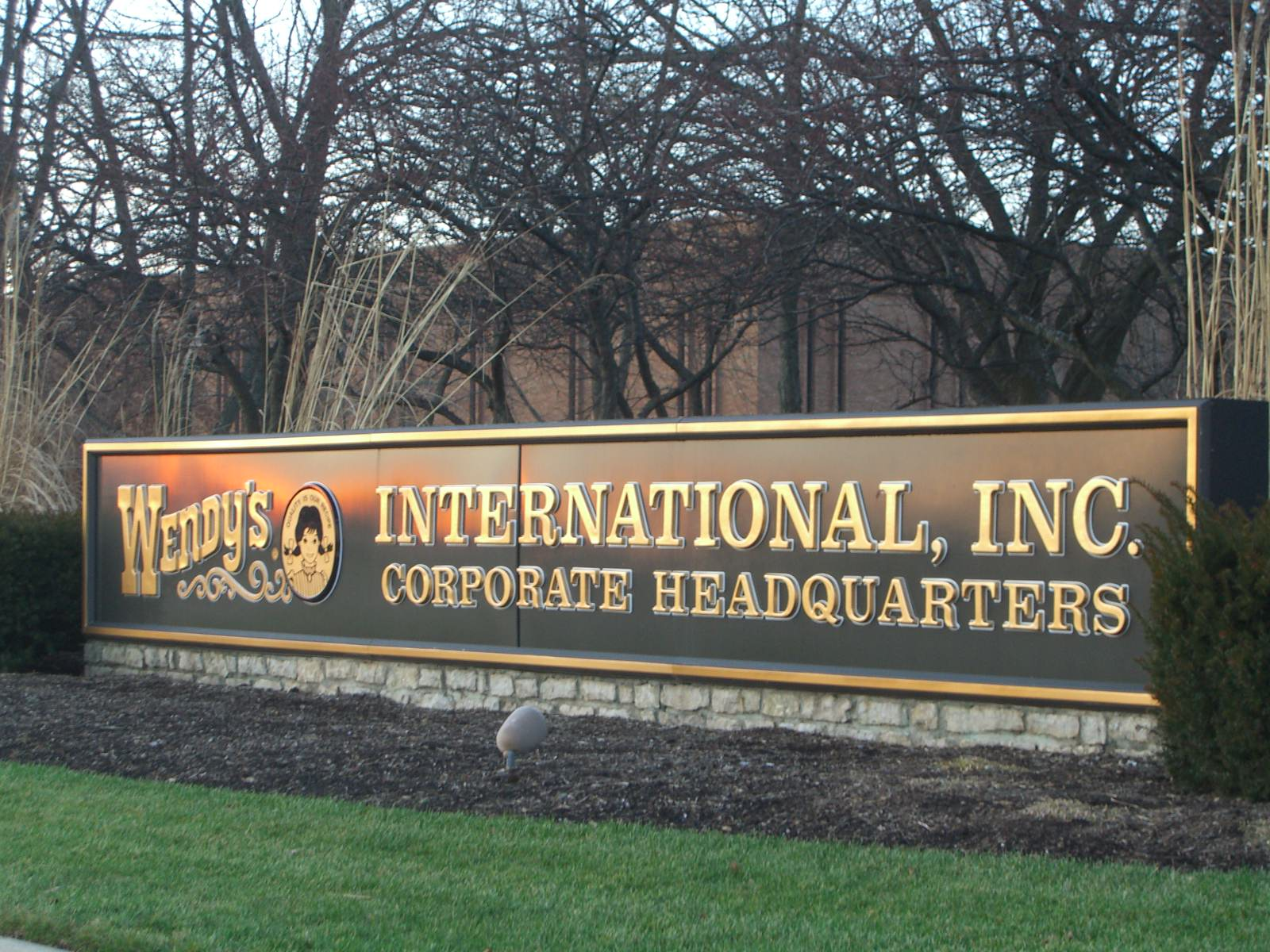
Entrance to Wendy's and Wendy's Company corporate headquarters

Dublin is home to the headquarters of several companies, the largest of which is Cardinal Health, the company with the fifteenth-highest revenue out of any US company in 2022. IGS Energy, Stanley Steemer, Wendy's and OCLC are all headquartered in Dublin as well. Pacer International, a larger intermodal logistics provider, was headquartered in Dublin until its acquisition by XPO, Inc. on March 31, 2014. OhioHealth also has significant operations in the Dublin area through the Dublin Methodist Hospital.

=== Top employers ===
According to the City's 2020 Comprehensive Annual Financial Report, the top employers in the city are:

#	Employer	# of employees
1	Cardinal Health	4,800
2	OhioHealth	2,000
3	Dublin City School District	1,951
4	CareWorks Family of Companies	1,622
5	OCLC	750
6	The Wendy’s Company	725
7	Quantum Health	600
8	Fiserv	600
9	Univar Solutions	550
10	Express Scripts	500

== Arts and culture ==
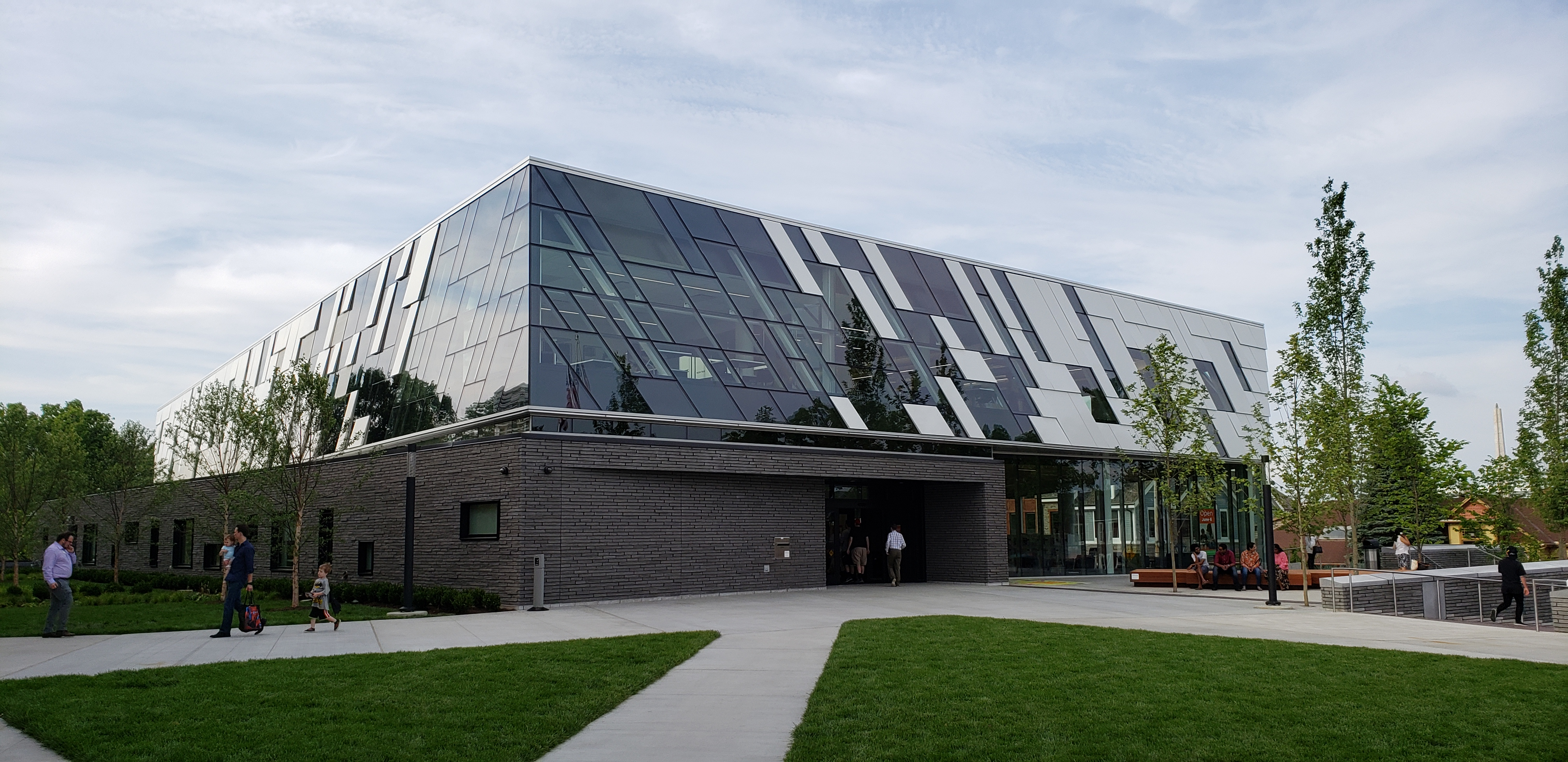
Dublin Branch of the Columbus Metropolitan Library

Several of Dublin's parks are home to a unique assortment of outdoor sculptures—part of the Art in Public Places collection, established by the Dublin Arts Council. In 1988, the council developed the program to enhance the quality of life for residents and to establish a public art tour throughout the city to attract visitors. It has since become a nationally recognized program. The series includes a 12 ft (3.7 m) tall stone portrait of local legend "Leatherlips" created by Ralph Helmick; Field of Corn, featuring 109 human-sized cement ears of corn that stand in one Dublin field; and a copper house that honors the region's Native American culture.

Ballantrae Park is located at the entrance of its namesake subdivision. Sitting upon a 20-foot (6.1 m) tall hillock, there is a 15-foot (4.6 m) bronze sculpture called Dancing Hares or Giant Dancing Rabbits. An interactive play fountain is found at the base of the hill.

The Dublin Branch of the Columbus Metropolitan Library is located in the city. Nearby libraries include the Northwest Library and the Hilliard Branch.

Annual events include: St. Patrick's Day Parade, The Memorial Tournament, Memorial Day Ceremony, Independence Day Celebration, Dublin Irish Festival (the largest 3-day Irish festival in the world), Halloween Spooktacular, Veteran's Day Ceremony and Tree Lighting.

=== Japanese community ===
Honda first established operations in Marysville in 1979. Japanese people began living in Dublin and other suburbs instead of Marysville because Dublin established a support system for Japanese residents and the suburbs offered Saturday schools for Japanese residents. As of the 2010 U.S. census, 1,071 Japanese people live in Dublin, making up 2.6% of the city's population. And also as of 2010, 122 Japanese live in Union County, making up 0.2% of the county's population; Marysville is in this county. As of 2011, Dublin has the highest concentration of Asians of any Ohio city. As of 2013 many Japanese expatriates working at Honda offices in the area live in Dublin. As of that year, in some subdivisions in Dublin, Japanese make up 20–30% of the residents. The community includes Japanese restaurants. A Coldwell Banker real estate agent named Akiko Miyamoto stated in Car Talk that the services provided for Japanese speakers by the Dublin City School District attract Japanese expatriates to Dublin. Holly Zachariah of The Columbus Dispatch stated that "It has been that way historically." According to the "2013 Japanese Direct Investment Survey" by the Consulate-General of Japan in Detroit, Dublin had 2,002 Japanese nationals, giving it the highest such population in the state.

== Parks and recreation ==
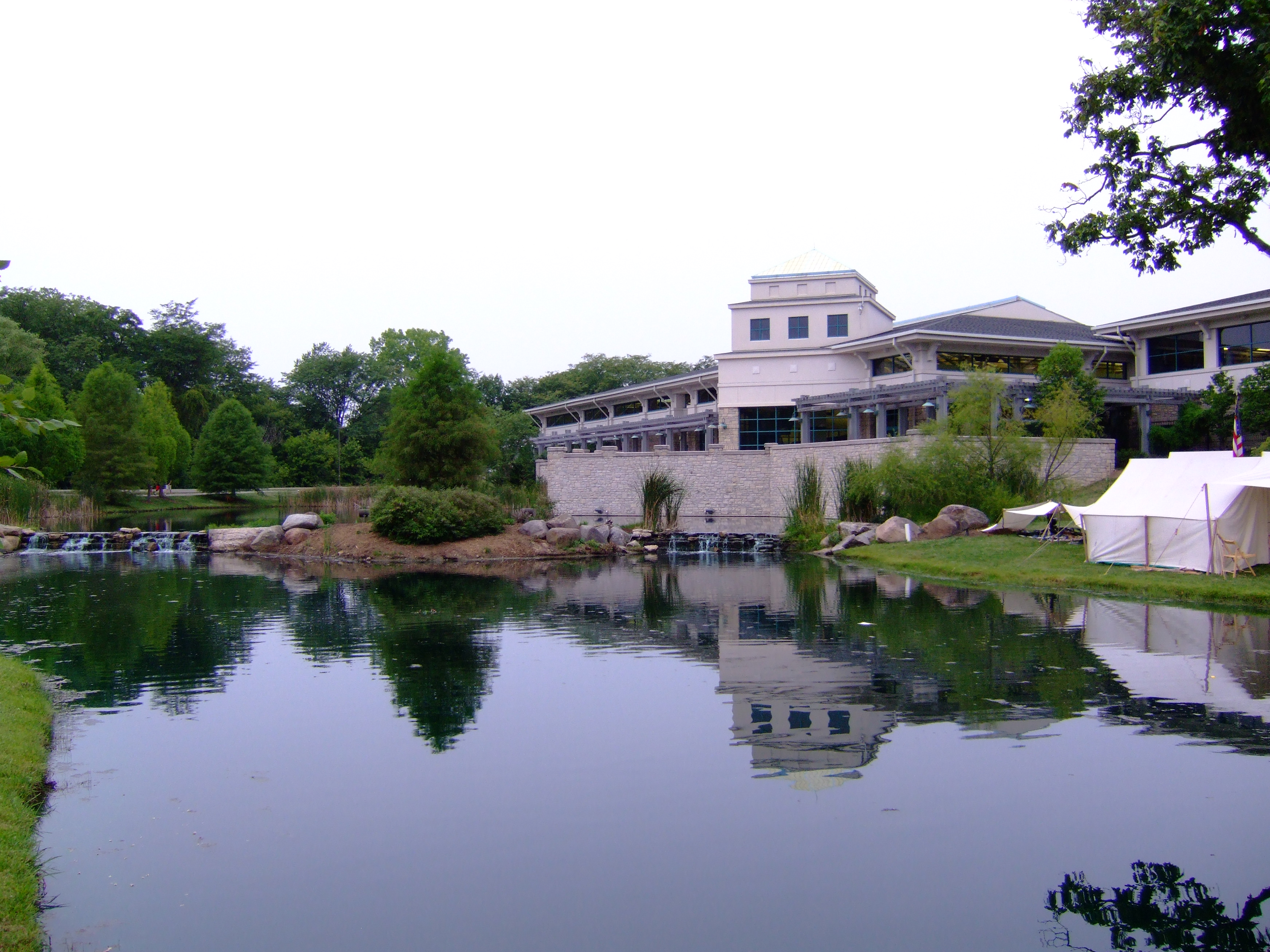
Dublin Community Recreation Center

Dublin maintains 64 developed parks covering more than 1,136 acres (4.597 km^{2}), along with 178 acres (0.7203 km^{2}) of undeveloped parkland. The city's park system includes 154 miles (247.84 km) of bike trails as well. Several Dublin parks are located along the Scioto River, including the two Dublin Kiwanis Riverway parks. The river is accessible at several points for small watercraft, and the nearby Griggs and O'Shaughnessy reservoirs allow motorboating and sailing.

The Rec Center is home to the Dublin Sea Dragons, a year-round competitive swim team.

Located on the outskirts of Dublin, Glacier Ridge Metro Park provides amenities and facilities for biking, disc golf, horseback riding, and picnicking. This park is not a part of the City of Dublin's parks, rather a unit of the Columbus and Franklin County Metroparks.

=== Golf ===
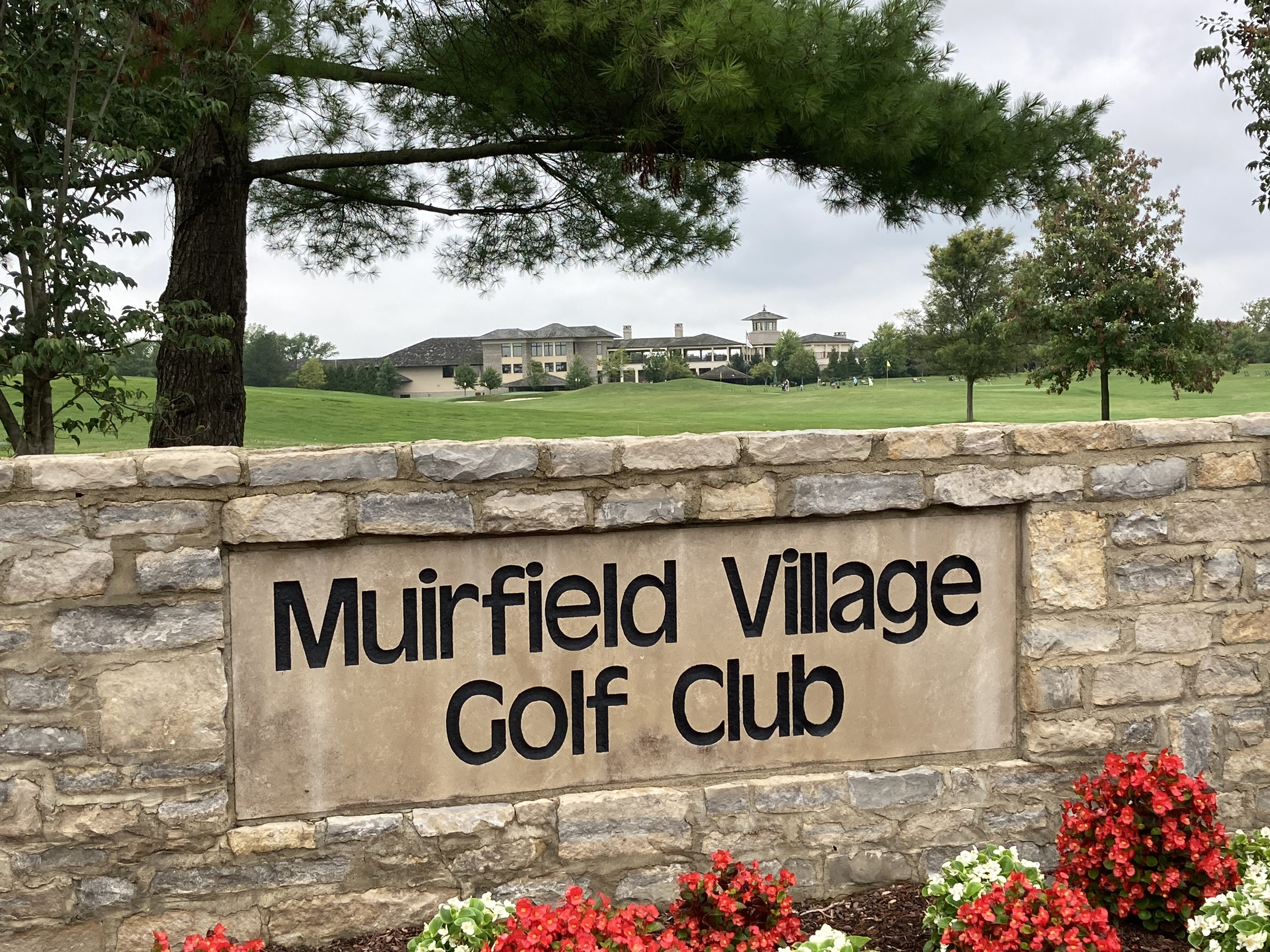
Muirfield Village Golf Club

The city has the following golf clubs:

- Muirfield Village Golf Club
- The Country Club at Muirfield Village
- Tartan Fields Golf Club
- The Golf Club of Dublin

Each year since 1976, in late May or early June, Muirfield Village Golf Club hosts the Memorial Tournament, a stop on golf's PGA Tour. The Muirfield Village Golf Club also hosted the Ryder Cup in 1987 and the Presidents Cup in 2013. Tartan Fields Golf Club hosted the LPGA's Wendy's Championship for Children from 2002 through 2006, and the Riviera Golf Club (closed in 2014) was home to the American-Italian Golf Association.

Dublin also has a public golf course financed by the Muirfield association.

== Transportation ==
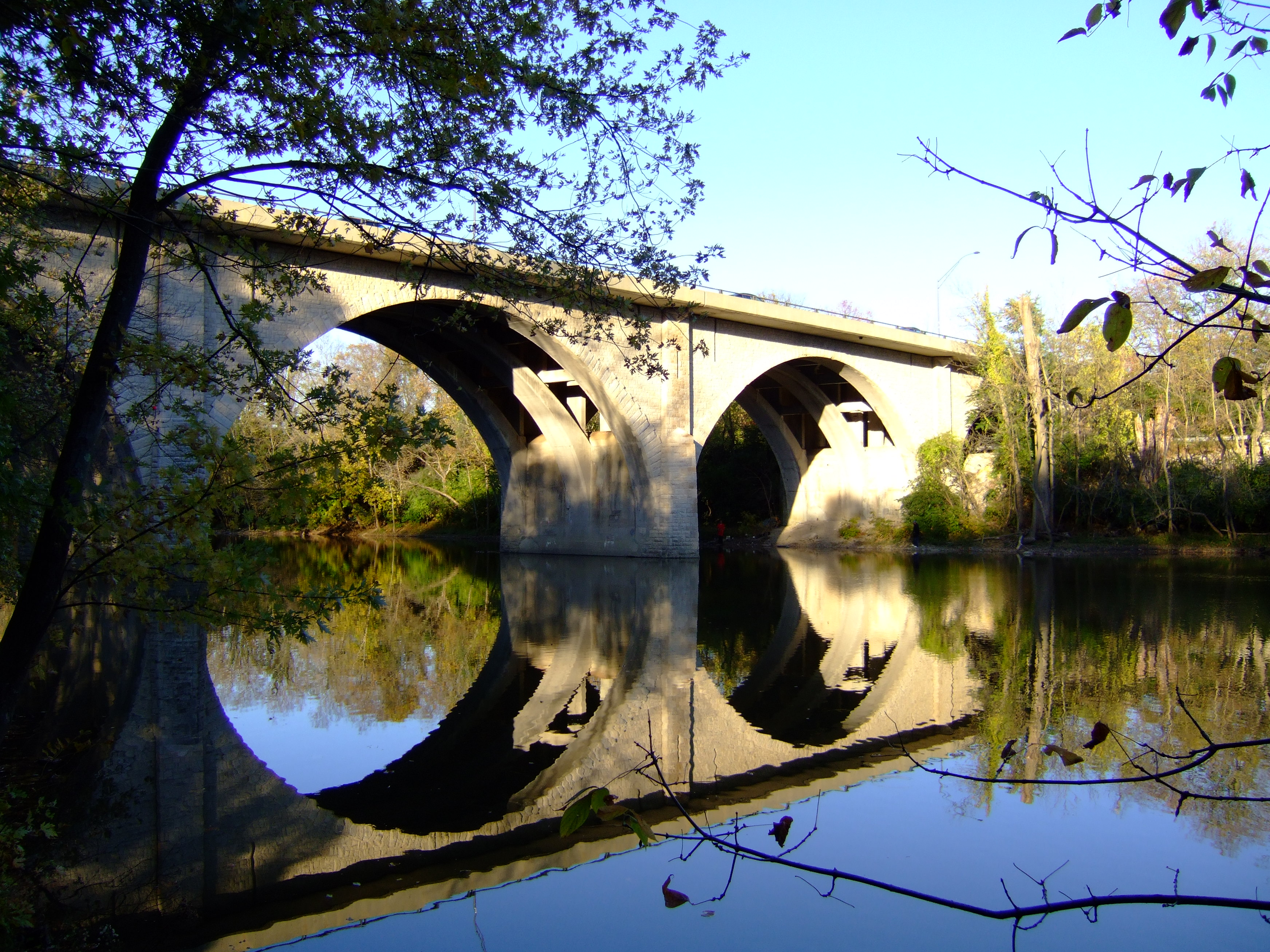
State Route 161 crossing the Scioto River

The suburban city is primarily accessed by car, with the main expressways serving the city being Interstate 270 (locally known as "the Outerbelt") and State Route 161 west of its interchange with 270. In the south, U.S. Route 33 flows through the city and runs concurrently with 161 between a roundabout in the center of Dublin and an interchange near a satellite campus of Ohio University. 161 and US 33 act as one of the main non-interstate roads through the historic part of Dublin. Additionally, Ohio State Route 257 runs from downtown Dublin's roundabout with 161 and US 33 to the city's north, and running parallel on the other side of the Scioto river is Ohio State Route 745, which also has a southern terminus in the historic part of Dublin. The Dublin Link, a pedestrian and cycling bridge, opened in March 2020.

The Central Ohio Transit Authority provides bus service in parts of the city: route 33 to parts of downtown and the Bridge Street District, while the rush hour route 73 provides express service from commercial areas to Downtown Columbus during rush hour periods.

Dublin's closest airport is the Ohio State University Airport, though general aviation and not regularly scheduled commercial flights occur through the airport. Commercial flights to and from Dublin are handled mostly through John Glenn International Airport near the Columbus suburb of Gahanna, with a small amount of commercial flights flowing through Rickenbacker International Airport.

== Education ==
=== Primary and secondary schools ===
The Dublin City School District has three high schools (Coffman, Scioto, and Jerome), five middle schools (Sells, Davis, Grizzell, Karrer, and Eversole) and fifteen elementary schools. The 2020–2021 school-year enrollment for the district was 16,254. The Hilliard City School District also serves a portion of the community. The Hilliard district operates one school, Washington Elementary School, in the city limits.

Area private schools include St. Brigid of Kildare Catholic School in Dublin, Meadows Academy, and St. Brendan School in Hilliard.

Tolles Career & Technical Center is in Plain City.

Columbus Japanese Language School, a Japanese supplementary school, holds its classes in Marysville, and has its school office in Worthington. In March 2020 the school was intending to rent space at Glacier Ridge Elementary School in Dublin. It was held online for a year prior to it beginning its Marysville location in September 2021.

=== Post-secondary education ===
Ohio University Heritage College of Osteopathic Medicine, Columbus State Community College, Ohio Dominican University, University of Dayton, and Franklin University have branches in the city.

== Notable people ==
- Alan Becker, online animator
- Jeremy Bobb, actor, played the police officer in The Wolf of Wall Street
- Eric Brunner, former soccer player for the Houston Dynamo, and Twitch CSGO gamer
- Nate Ebner, NFL safety for the NYG and rugby Olympian
- Jon Field, racing driver
- Nick Goings, NFL fullback for the Carolina Panthers
- Sean Kuraly, NHL forward for the Columbus Bluejackets
- Urban Meyer, former head Coach of the Ohio State University
- Connor Murphy, NHL defenseman for the Chicago Blackhawks
- Chinedum Ndukwe, NFL safety for the Oakland Raiders
- Jack Nicklaus, iconic PGA champion in World Golf Hall of Fame
- Brady Quinn, NFL quarterback
- Chris Quinn, NBA guard
- Jay Richardson, NFL defensive end and local TV football analyst
- Mitch Rowland, Grammy award winning songwriter and lead guitarist in Harry Styles' band
- Abby Steiner, Track and Field sprinter
- Chad Whitson, MLB umpire
- Ed Whitson, MLB pitcher
- Garrett Wilson, NFL wide receiver for the New York Jets
- Chris Wood, actor
- Vince Workman, NFL running back

== See also ==
- Irish place names in other countries
- Dublin Core
