= Sharon Township, Franklin County, Ohio =

Township in Ohio, US

- Township
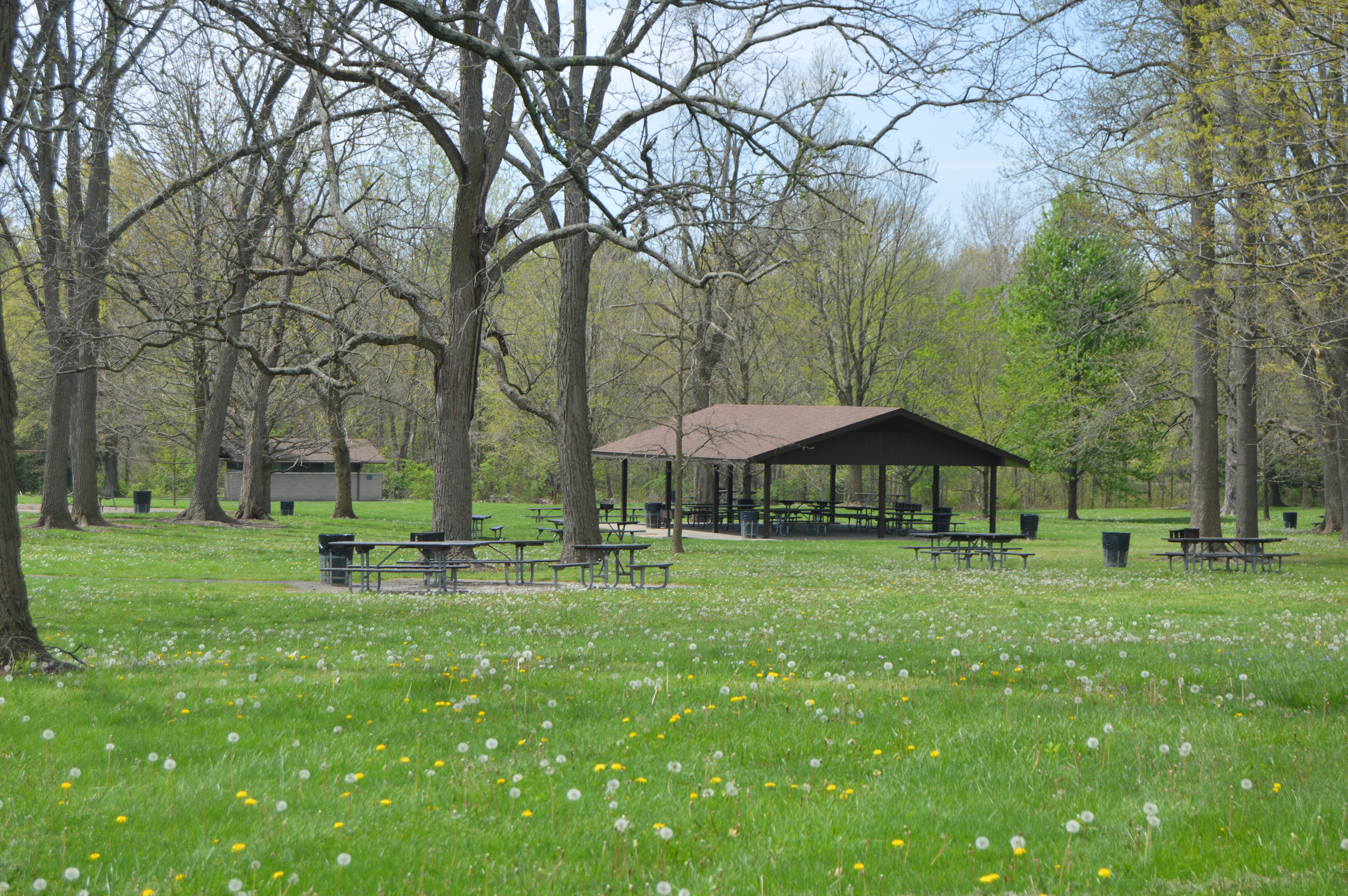
- Sharon Woods Metro Park

- Location of Sharon Township in Franklin County
- Coordinates: 40°5′52″N 83°1′15″W
- Country: United States
- State: Ohio
- County: Franklin

Area
  - Total: 9.0 sq mi (23.2 km^{2})
  - Land: 8.8 sq mi (22.8 km^{2})
  - Water: 0.15 sq mi (0.4 km^{2})
- Elevation: 846 ft (258 m)

Population (2020)
  - Total: 17,168
  - Density: 1,950/sq mi (753/km^{2})
- Time zone: UTC-5 (Eastern (EST))
  - Summer (DST): UTC-4 (EDT)
- FIPS code: 39-71787
- GNIS feature ID: 1086114
- Website: www.sharontwp.us

Sharon Township is one of the seventeen townships of Franklin County, Ohio, United States. As of the 2020 census the population was 17,168.

== Geography ==
Most of Sharon Township has been annexed by the cities of Westerville, in the northeast of the township, Worthington, in the center of the township, and Columbus (the county seat of Franklin County), around the edges of the township. The village of Riverlea is located in the central part of the township, south of Worthington.

Today, the township is composed of many small "islands," all of which border the city of Columbus. While some are completely surrounded by Columbus, several have other borders:

- In the northeast, one "island" is surrounded by Westerville, while another borders the city to the north and east
- In the north, one "island" borders Worthington to the south
- In the northwest, one "island" borders Perry Township to the west and Delaware County's Liberty and Orange Townships to the northwest and north respectively.

== Name and history ==
Statewide, other Sharon Townships are located in Medina, Noble, and Richland counties.

== Government ==
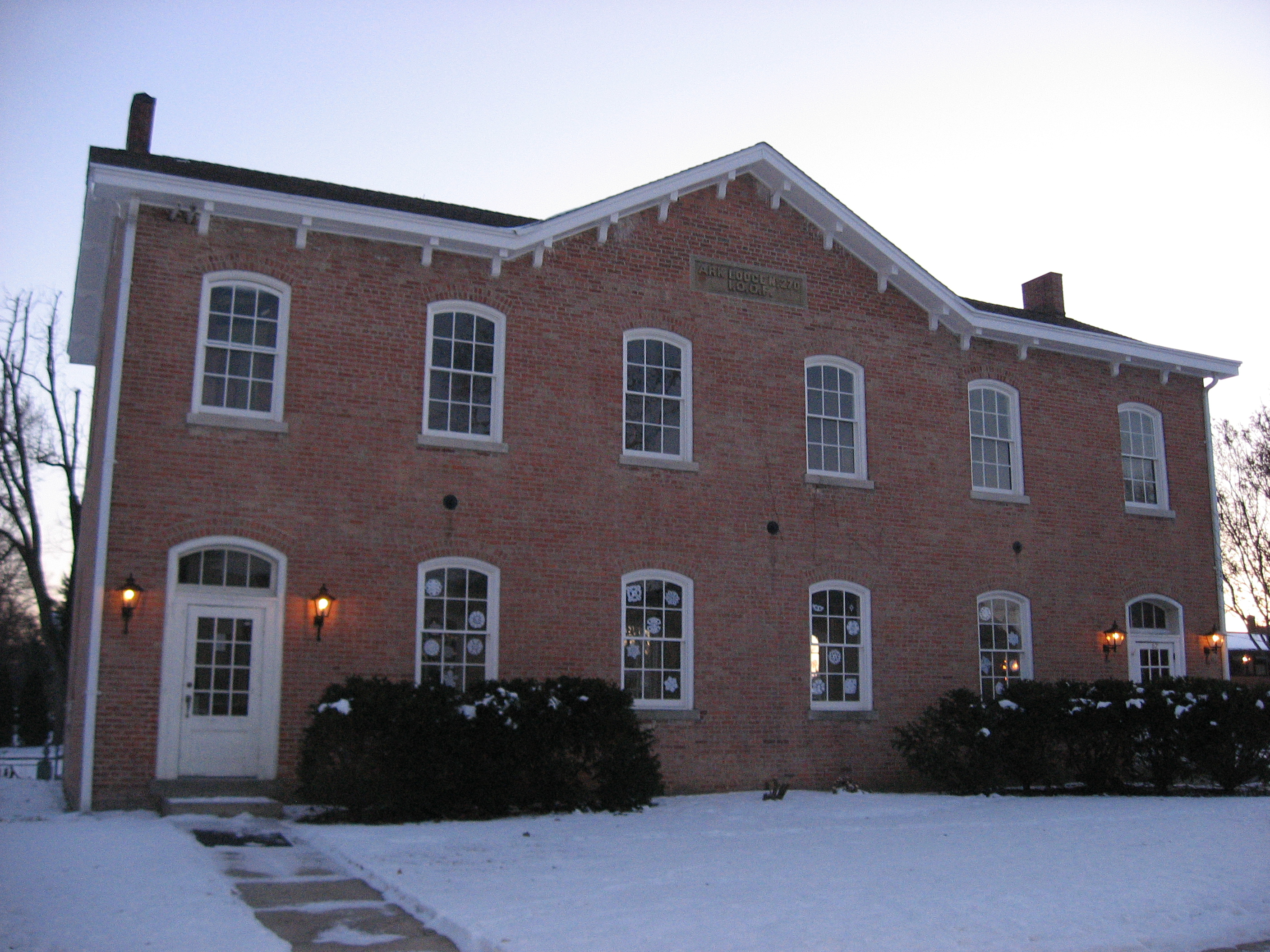
Sharon Town Hall in Worthington

The township is governed by a three-member board of trustees, who are elected in November of odd-numbered years to a four-year term beginning on the following January 1. Two are elected in the year after the presidential election and one is elected in the year before it. There is also an elected township fiscal officer, who serves a four-year term beginning on April 1 of the year after the election, which is held in November of the year before the presidential election. Vacancies in the fiscal officership or on the board of trustees are filled by the remaining trustees.
