= Liberty Township, Delaware County, Ohio =

Township in Ohio, US

- Township
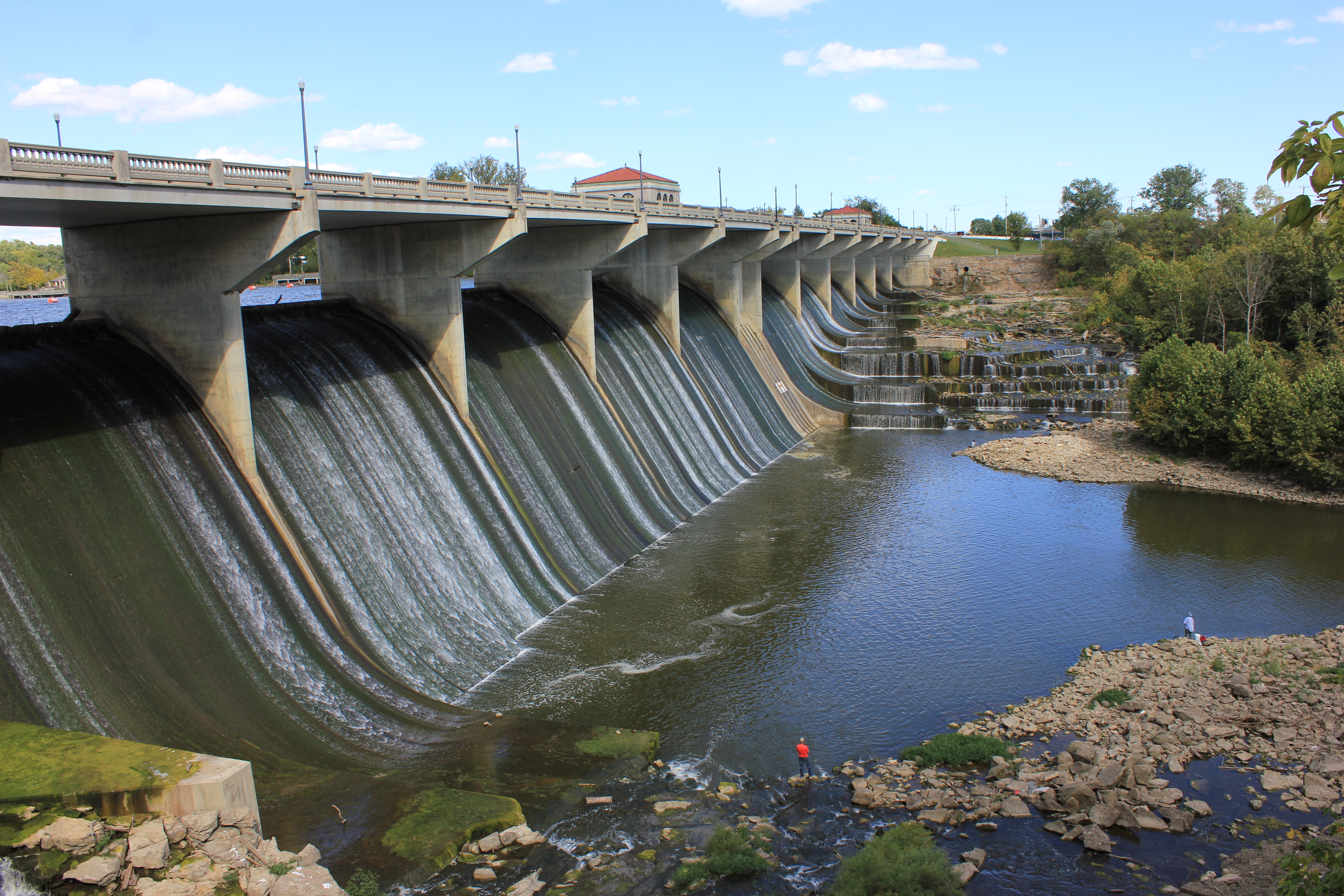
- O'Shaughnessy Dam
- Motto: "A Nice Place to Live!"
- Location of Liberty Township in Delaware County
- Coordinates: 40°10′7″N 83°4′44″W
- Country: United States
- State: Ohio
- County: Delaware

Area
  - Total: 33.4 sq mi (86.4 km^{2})
  - Land: 32.8 sq mi (85.0 km^{2})
  - Water: 0.54 sq mi (1.4 km^{2})
- Elevation: 890 ft (270 m)

Population (2020)
  - Total: 33,252
  - Density: 1,010/sq mi (391/km^{2})
- Time zone: UTC-5 (Eastern (EST))
  - Summer (DST): UTC-4 (EDT)
- FIPS code: 39-43106
- GNIS feature ID: 1086050
- Website: www.libertytwp.org

Liberty Township is one of the eighteen townships of Delaware County, Ohio, United States. The 2020 census reported a population of 33,252 in the township.

== Geography ==
Located in the southwestern part of the county, it borders the following townships and city:

- Delaware Township - north
- Berlin Township - northeast
- Orange Township - east
- Sharon Township, Franklin County - southeast corner
- Perry Township, Franklin County - south
- Dublin - southwest
- Concord Township - west

The city of Powell is located in southern Liberty Township, and the ghost town of Carpenter's Mill lies in the township.

== Demographics ==
Historical population
| Census | Pop. | Note | %± |
|---|---|---|---|
| 1990 | 3,790 | | — |
| 2000 | 15,429 | | 307.1% |
| 2010 | 26,172 | | 69.6% |
| 2020 | 33,252 | | 27.1% |
U.S. Decennial Census

=== 2020 census ===
Liberty Township racial composition
| Race | Number | Percentage |
|---|---|---|
| White (NH) | 26,053 | 78.4% |
| Black or African American (NH) | 584 | 1.76% |
| Native American (NH) | 46 | 0.14% |
| Asian (NH) | 3,875 | 11.7% |
| Pacific Islander (NH) | 8 | 0.02% |
| Other/mixed | 1,863 | 5.60% |
| Hispanic or Latino | 913 | 2.75% |

== Name and history ==
It is one of twenty-five Liberty Townships statewide.

The first non-American Indian settler of Liberty Township - also of Delaware County - was Capt. Nathan Carpenter, who settled in the township on May 1, 1801, after a journey of over 2½ months from New York City. Liberty Township was also "one of the three original townships into which the county was divided for temporary purposes, at the time of its formation."

== Government ==
The township is governed by a three-member board of trustees, who are elected in November of odd-numbered years to a four-year term beginning on the following January 1. Two are elected in the year after the presidential election and one is elected in the year before it. There is also an elected township fiscal officer, who serves a four-year term beginning on April 1 of the year after the election, which is held in November of the year before the presidential election. Vacancies in the fiscal officership or on the board of trustees are filled by the remaining trustees.
