= O'Shaughnessy Dam (Ohio) =

- O'Shaughnessy Dam and Bridge
- U.S. National Register of Historic Places
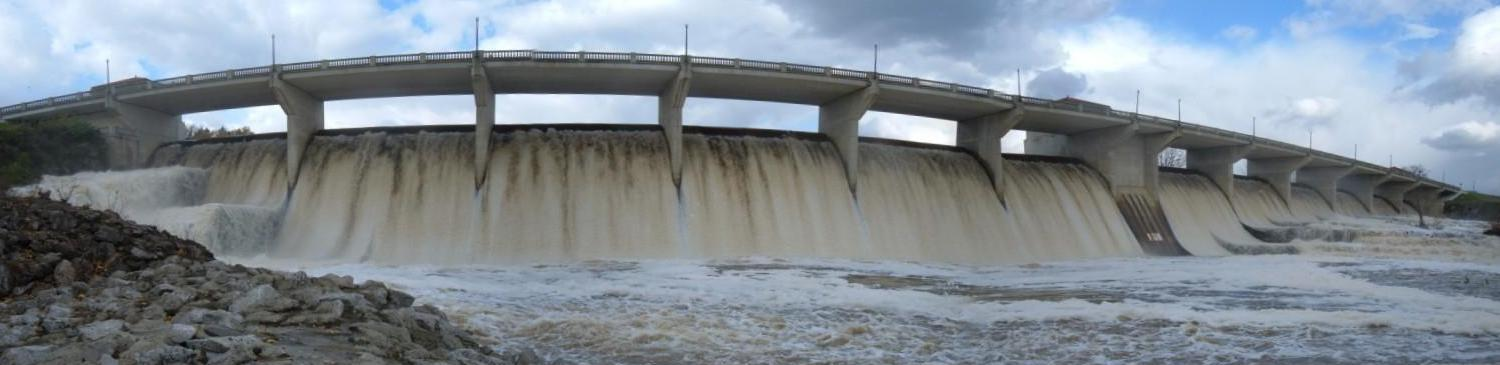
- View below the dam

- Location within Ohio Location within the United States
- Location: Concord Township / Liberty Township, Delaware County, Ohio, US
- Nearest city: Shawnee Hills, Ohio
- Coordinates: 40°09′14″N 83°07′33″W
- Built: 1922
- Built by: Thompson-Starrett Co.
- Architect: Frank Packard
- Architectural style: Late 19th and 20th Century Revivals, Classical Revival, Second Renaissance Revival
- NRHP reference No.: 90000482
- Added to NRHP: July 5, 1990

The O'Shaughnessy Dam is located on the Scioto River near Dublin, Ohio, United States. The dam forms O'Shaughnessy Reservoir, which is a major source of drinking water for the city of Columbus. It was completed in 1925 following recommendations of then superintendent Jerry O'Shaughnessy (for whom the dam was named). At the time, the reservoir was described as "the finest inland waterway in the United States." Located 10 miles (16 km) upstream of the smaller Griggs Dam, it provides a large area for various forms of recreation in addition to its water supply duties. The reservoir holds 6.3 billion US gallons (24,000,000 m^{3}) over a surface area of 845 acres (3.42 km^{2}). The Columbus Zoo and Aquarium is located on the east bank of the reservoir, near the dam.

In 1990, the dam was listed on the National Register of Historic Places.

== Hydroelectricity ==
The city of Columbus installed a hydroelectric operation on the west side of the dam, which was completed in 1987. The turbines can only be operated when there is sufficient flow, which means the dam cannot continuously produce electricity. With a head of 18 feet (5.5 m), the two turbines together produce 5 megawatts.

Despite numerous repair attempts the Hydroelectric Turbines have remained offline for approximately three years (ostensibly as of August 2018). In January, 2021, The City of Columbus announced plans to repair the hydropower unit and restore the plant to full capacity by 2023.
