= National Register of Historic Places listings in Delaware County, Ohio =

Location of Delaware County in Ohio

This is a list of the National Register of Historic Places listings in Delaware County, Ohio.

This is intended to be a complete list of the properties and districts on the National Register of Historic Places in Delaware County, Ohio, United States. The locations of National Register properties and districts for which the latitude and longitude coordinates are included below, may be seen in an online map.

There are 60 properties and districts listed on the National Register in the county. Another property was once listed but has been removed.

This National Park Service list is complete through NPS recent listings posted June 20, 2025.

== Current listings ==
	Name on the Register	Image	Date listed	Location	City or town	Description
1	Austin Hall	Austin Hall	March 18, 1985 (#85000631)	Ohio Wesleyan University, W. Central Ave. and Elizabeth St. 40°18′06″N 83°04′37″W	Delaware	
2	John Baker Tavern	John Baker Tavern	September 6, 2006 (#06000766)	4151 State Route 203, in Radnor; 40°22′46″N 83°08′58″W	Radnor Township	
3	George Bieber House and Farm	George Bieber House and Farm	October 3, 1991 (#91001426)	2010 Stratford Rd., south of Delaware; 40°15′56″N 83°03′53″W	Delaware Township	
4	Building at 101 North Franklin Street	Building at 101 North Franklin Street	November 25, 1980 (#80002990)	101 N. Franklin St. 40°24′38″N 82°57′18″W	Ashley	
5	Building at 223 West High Street	Building at 223 West High Street	November 25, 1980 (#80002991)	223 W. High St. 40°24′33″N 82°57′41″W	Ashley	
6	Building at 500 East High Street	Building at 500 East High Street	November 25, 1980 (#80002992)	500 E. High St. 40°24′32″N 82°56′57″W	Ashley	
7	Building at 505 East High Street	Building at 505 East High Street	November 25, 1980 (#80002993)	505 E. High St. 40°24′32″N 82°56′54″W	Ashley	
8	Center Inn	Center Inn	January 11, 1983 (#83001956)	Southeast of Sunbury on State Route 37; 40°13′01″N 82°48′02″W	Trenton Township	
9	Chambers Road Covered Bridge	Chambers Road Covered Bridge	November 21, 1974 (#74001465)	1.5 mi (2.4 km) northeast of Olive Green; 40°20′17″N 82°49′05″W	Porter Township	
10	Cleveland, Columbus, Cincinnati & Indianapolis Railroad Depot	Cleveland, Columbus, Cincinnati & Indianapolis Railroad Depot	November 21, 2022 (#100008393)	60 Lake St. 40°18′02″N 83°03′31″W	Delaware	
11	John Cook Farm	John Cook Farm	April 11, 1977 (#77001059)	East of Harlem at Miller Paul Rd. and Gorsuch Rd. 40°09′05″N 82°49′26″W	Harlem Township	
12	Samuel Cooper Farmhouse	Samuel Cooper Farmhouse	May 6, 1993 (#93000395)	695 Lawrence Rd., south of Radnor; 40°19′33″N 83°09′33″W	Radnor Township	
13	Crist Tavern Annex-Millworkers Boarding House	Crist Tavern Annex-Millworkers Boarding House	March 25, 1994 (#94000277)	2966 Olentangy River Rd., south of Delaware; 40°15′20″N 83°03′51″W	Delaware Township	
14	Marcus Curtiss Inn	Marcus Curtiss Inn	December 12, 1976 (#76001415)	South of Galena at 3860 Sunbury Rd. 40°11′30″N 82°52′26″W	Genoa Township	
15	Delaware County Courthouse	Delaware County Courthouse	May 22, 1973 (#73001429)	N. Sandusky St. and Central Ave. 40°18′06″N 83°04′06″W	Delaware	
16	Delaware County Jail and Sheriff's Residence	Delaware County Jail and Sheriff's Residence	July 12, 1990 (#90001083)	20 W. Central Ave. 40°18′06″N 83°04′09″W	Delaware	
17	Delaware Post Office	Delaware Post Office	December 30, 2019 (#100004824)	60 South Sandusky St. 40°17′49″N 83°04′06″W	Delaware	Now the Richard Ross Museum of Art
18	Delaware Public Library	Delaware Public Library	January 11, 1983 (#83001957)	101 N. Sandusky St. 40°18′08″N 83°03′56″W	Delaware	
19	John Detwiller Tavern and Farmstead	John Detwiller Tavern and Farmstead	April 16, 1993 (#93000294)	2877 N. State Route 257, west of Radnor; 40°22′00″N 83°11′19″W	Thompson Township	
20	Edwards Gymnasium/Pfieffer Natatorium	Edwards Gymnasium/Pfieffer Natatorium	March 18, 1985 (#85000632)	Ohio Wesleyan University Main Campus, S. Sandusky St. 40°17′41″N 83°04′03″W	Delaware	
21	Elliott Hall, Sturges Library, and Merrick Hall	Elliott Hall, Sturges Library, and Merrick Hall	April 23, 1973 (#73001430)	Ohio Wesleyan University campus 40°17′46″N 83°03′58″W	Delaware	
22	Felkner-Anderson House	Felkner-Anderson House	February 11, 1988 (#88000074)	9716 Fontanelle Rd., northwest of Ostrander; 40°17′02″N 83°14′20″W	Scioto Township	
23	Gooding House and Tavern	Gooding House and Tavern	July 27, 2005 (#05000753)	7669 Stagers Loop; 40°10′53″N 83°01′29″W	Orange Township	
24	Greenwood Farm	Greenwood Farm	April 17, 1979 (#79001825)	North of Delaware off U.S. Route 42; 40°18′42″N 83°03′41″W	Delaware Township	
25	High House	High House	February 13, 1986 (#86000238)	2360 Panhandle Rd., north of Delaware; 40°19′51″N 83°03′44″W	Troy Township	
26	Highbank Park Works	Highbank Park Works	February 15, 1974 (#74001466)	On a bluff above the eastern bank of the Olentangy River; 40°08′27″N 83°01′51″W	Orange Township	
27	Highbanks Metropolitan Park Mounds I and II	Highbanks Metropolitan Park Mounds I and II	March 19, 1975 (#75001375)	Eastern side of the Olentangy River, north of Worthington and east of Powell; 40°08′53″N 83°01′29″W	Orange Township	
28	Historic Northwest District	Historic Northwest District	February 29, 1996 (#96000225)	Roughly bounded by Pennsylvania Ave., N. Sandusky St., W. William St., Elizabeth St., W. Fountain St., and N. Franklin St. 40°18′30″N 83°04′07″W	Delaware	
29	Diadatus Keeler House	Diadatus Keeler House	February 28, 1979 (#79001826)	Southeast of Galena at 4567 Red Bank Rd. 40°10′45″N 82°51′50″W	Genoa Township	
30	Samuel Lewis Farmhouse	Samuel Lewis Farmhouse	April 16, 1993 (#93000295)	5979 Radnor Rd., west of Radnor; 40°22′59″N 83°11′00″W	Radnor Township	
31	Limestone Vale	Limestone Vale	October 2, 1978 (#78002055)	3490 Olentangy River Rd., south of Delaware; 40°14′52″N 83°03′38″W	Liberty Township	
32	Forrest Meeker House and Farm	Forrest Meeker House and Farm	October 3, 1991 (#91001427)	2690 Stratford Rd., south of Delaware; 40°15′31″N 83°03′51″W	Delaware Township	
33	Mill Worker House No. 1	Mill Worker House No. 1	October 3, 1991 (#91001431)	2665 Stratford Rd., south of Delaware; 40°15′32″N 83°03′48″W	Delaware Township	
34	Mill Worker House No. 3	Mill Worker House No. 3	October 3, 1991 (#91001433)	2505 Stratford Rd., south of Delaware; 40°15′38″N 83°03′47″W	Delaware Township	
35	Mill Worker House No. 4	Mill Worker House No. 4	October 3, 1991 (#91001434)	2441 Stratford Rd., south of Delaware; 40°15′39″N 83°03′47″W	Delaware Township	
36	Mill Worker House No. 5	Mill Worker House No. 5	October 3, 1991 (#91001435)	2441 Stratford Rd., south of Delaware; 40°15′40″N 83°03′47″W	Delaware Township	
37	Edward E. Neff House	Edward E. Neff House	January 28, 1988 (#87002546)	123 N. Franklin St. 40°18′10″N 83°04′09″W	Delaware	
38	O'Shaughnessy Dam and Bridge	O'Shaughnessy Dam and Bridge	July 5, 1990 (#90000482)	County Road 126 between State Routes 257 and 745, east of Shawnee Hills; 40°09′14″N 83°07′34″W	Concord and Liberty Townships	
39	Ohio Wesleyan University Fraternity Hill Historic District		August 29, 2019 (#100004312)	4, 9, 10, 15, 19, 20, 23, 30, and 35 Williams Drive; 40°17′48″N 83°04′36″W	Delaware	
40	Ohio Wesleyan University Student Observatory	Ohio Wesleyan University Student Observatory	March 18, 1985 (#85000633)	Ohio Wesleyan University, W. William St. 40°17′55″N 83°04′35″W	Delaware	
41	Norman Dewey Perry House	Norman Dewey Perry House	October 3, 1991 (#91001429)	2367 Stratford Rd., south of Delaware; 40°15′46″N 83°03′45″W	Delaware Township	
42	Radnor Township Hall		June 26, 2023 (#100009061)	4425 OH 203; 40°23′03″N 83°09′03″W	Radnor Township	
43	James Richey Farmhouse	James Richey Farmhouse	September 2, 1993 (#93000891)	1395 S. State Route 257; 40°17′59″N 83°09′55″W	Scioto Township	
44	St. Mary's Church and Rectory	St. Mary's Church and Rectory	May 23, 1980 (#80002994)	82 E. William St. 40°17′54″N 83°03′58″W	Delaware	
45	Sanborn Hall	Sanborn Hall	March 18, 1985 (#85000634)	Ohio Wesleyan University, W. Campus; 40°18′01″N 83°04′36″W	Delaware	
46	Sandusky Street Historic District	Sandusky Street Historic District	December 17, 1982 (#82001373)	44 S. to 92 N. Sandusky, 46 E. to 31 W. Winter, and 9 E. to 17 W. William; 40°17′56″N 83°04′04″W	Delaware	
47	Selby Field	Selby Field	March 18, 1985 (#85000635)	Ohio Wesleyan University, Henry St. 40°17′48″N 83°03′49″W	Delaware	
48	Samuel Sharp House	Samuel Sharp House	July 29, 1982 (#82003563)	7436 Horseshoe Rd., west of Ashley; 40°24′00″N 83°02′07″W	Marlboro Township	
49	Stephen Sharp House	Stephen Sharp House	September 30, 1982 (#82003564)	8025 Africa Rd. 40°08′36″N 82°56′20″W	Westerville	
50	Slocum Hall	Slocum Hall	March 18, 1985 (#85000636)	Ohio Wesleyan University Main Campus, Sandusky St. 40°17′46″N 83°04′01″W	Delaware	
51	Spruce Run Earthworks	Spruce Run Earthworks	July 16, 1973 (#73001431)	Along Spruce Run south of Galena; 40°10′40″N 82°51′52″W	Genoa Township	
52	Stratford Methodist Episcopal Church	Stratford Methodist Episcopal Church	October 3, 1991 (#91001436)	Junction of U.S. Route 23 and State Route 315, south of Delaware; 40°15′22″N 83°03′49″W	Delaware Township	
53	Stuyvesant Hall	Stuyvesant Hall	March 18, 1985 (#85000637)	Ohio Wesleyan University, W. William St. 40°17′54″N 83°04′33″W	Delaware	
54	Sunbury Tavern	Sunbury Tavern	February 24, 1975 (#75001376)	Northwestern corner of State Route 37 and Galena Rd. 40°14′31″N 82°51′36″W	Sunbury	
55	Sunbury Town Hall	Sunbury Town Hall	February 20, 1975 (#75001377)	Town Sq. 40°14′32″N 82°51′32″W	Sunbury	
56	Ufferman Site		July 24, 1974 (#74001464)	North of Delaware, near Delaware Lake	Troy Township	
57	University Hall-Gray's Chapel	University Hall-Gray's Chapel	March 18, 1985 (#85000638)	Ohio Wesleyan University Main Campus, Sandusky St. 40°17′47″N 83°04′01″W	Delaware	
58	Henry Van Deman House	Henry Van Deman House	May 31, 1984 (#84003662)	6 Darlington Rd. 40°18′31″N 83°04′30″W	Delaware	
59	Warren Tavern Complex	Warren Tavern Complex	August 3, 1983 (#83001958)	U.S. Route 36 west of Delaware; 40°17′58″N 83°07′45″W	Radnor Township	
60	West Orange Road-Thomas Bridge	West Orange Road-Thomas Bridge	June 26, 2002 (#02000701)	Orange Rd., east of its junction with State Route 315, and northeast of Powell; 40°10′31″N 83°02′44″W	Liberty Township	

== Former listing ==
	Name on the Register	Image	Date listed	Date removed	Location	City or town	Description
1	Monnett Hall	Monnett Hall	June 23, 1975 (#75001374)	February 20, 1980	Ohio Wesleyan University campus at Elizabeth and Winter Sts. 40°18′04″N 83°04′36″W	Delaware	Demolished in 1978.

== See also ==
- List of National Historic Landmarks in Ohio
- Listings in neighboring counties: Franklin, Knox, Licking, Marion, Morrow, Union
- National Register of Historic Places listings in Ohio
