= Spruce Run =

Spruce Run may refer to:

- Spruce Run (Delaware County, Ohio)
  - Spruce Run Earthworks
- Spruce Run (Buffalo Creek tributary), in Union County, Pennsylvania
- Spruce Run (Little Fishing Creek tributary), in Columbia County, Pennsylvania
- Spruce Run (Raritan River tributary), in Hunterdon County, New Jersey
- Spruce Run, New Jersey, in Hunterdon County, New Jersey
  - Spruce Run Evangelical Lutheran Zion Church
- Spruce Run Recreation Area, in Hunterdon County, New Jersey
