= Highbanks =

Highbanks may refer to

- Highbanks Metro Park
- Highbanks Metropolitan Park Mounds I and II
- Highbank Park Works
- Highbank, New Zealand, a locality in Selwyn District
