= Swack Church =

Ruined church

Coordinates: 40°44′31″N 74°53′59″W

The Mt. Bethel Evangelical Lutheran Church and Cemetery, popularly known as the Swack Church or Old Swack Church, was a Lutheran church located in Lebanon Township, New Jersey. Abandoned by its congregation in 1896, it has since become a historical curiosity and the subject of a yet-unsolved ownership issue.

== Formation ==
The Swack Church was founded by Reverend Lambert Swackhamer (1805-1857), a Lutheran minister from Middle Valley, New Jersey and the son of Stephen Swackhamer and Jane Swackhamer (née Bowman). Lambert Swackhamer, early in his life, moved to Hartwick, New York, where he attended Hartwick Seminary, graduating in 1831. He was assigned as the pastor of the Lutheran church in Manheim, New York, but withdrew from the synod there due to a doctrinal dispute. He accepted a position in the synod of his hometown, Hartwick, but eventually resigned there as well due to their support of slavery. He co-founded his own synod, the Franckean Synod, in 1837. The Franckean Synod was eventually declared "un-Lutheran" and disbanded, and Swackhamer returned to the Hartwick congregation.

In 1844, Swackhamer moved his family back to the area of his birth, in Long Valley, New Jersey. Swackhamer may have been hoping to receive the pastorship of the local Zion Lutheran Church (situated in present-day Oldwick, New Jersey), but was turned down, prompting him to found his own church in nearby Lebanon.

Swackhamer was donated land for his church at Mount Bethel in Lebanon by Moore Castner. The new church was named for the mason who built it, Jacob Swackhammer (aka "Stuttering Jake", b. 1793). The "Swacke Church", as it was originally spelled, was constructed in 1844 at Mount Bethel. It was a stone building covered in stucco, and evidence suggests the roof may have been elevated to accommodate a balcony. As was typical of churches at this time, there was no fireplace or chimney. Instead, and area of the dirt floor near the center of the building would have been prepared for a pile of hot coals, with a smoke stack in the roof directly above it. Swackhamer and his family occupied a log cabin near the church, and a small burial ground occupied the grounds.

== Abandonment ==
In 1850, Lambert Swackhamer accepted the pastorship of the Lutheran Church in Berne, New York, where he lived until his death on November 2, 1857. Moore Castner took possession of the land the church and associated structures occupied, and sold it to a local Methodist congregation led by a minister by the name of Albright. The Albright congregation could not afford the property, however, and the church was re-organized for use by local Lutherans once again. The Evangelical Lutheran Church of New Jersey purchased the property from Castner in 1868. The Spruce Run Evangelical Lutheran Zion Church in Spruce Run, New Jersey used the Swack Church as an outpost until 1896, when the property was abandoned. It gradually became overgrown and the church covered in vines, until an attempt was made to save the structure was undertaken by the local legion in the 1930s. After that, the Swack Church was mostly forgotten for over half a century, to the point that by 2010, the pastor of the Spruce Run Church did not even know its location.

== Ownership investigation ==
The question of the Swack Church's ownership was first raised in the early 1980s, when local historians proposed building a fence around the property in an effort to protect it. At that time, township officials were unable to determine who was responsible for the property. In 2007, a township committee voted to condemn the church ruins and take ownership of the property, but did not follow through on this plan. The committee determined that if efforts were made to stabilize the crumbing church, the town must first determine who owned it. Then-Mayor Ed Post suggested that the deed for the land had in fact been granted to a group of local historians in 1992, but no documentation could be found to prove this and the historians in question were either deceased or had moved away. By condemning the church, Post hoped that the owners might surface during the notification process.

In 2013, a group composed of the Friends of Old Swack Church, Metro Trails, GraveMatters, as well as members of the Union Forge Heritage Association and the Association for Gravestone Studies undertook a cleanup of the Swackhammer Cemetery, the burial ground on the site which houses burial plots dating as far back as 1801. The cemetery's last burial was listed as 1915, and most of the stones have since been displaced from their burial plots - only a few remain legible. The cemetery apparently includes the grave of a female freed slave, buried there after the Civil War, marked only by two field stones. This form of burial indicates that despite Swackhamer's anti-slavery stance, former slaves were still seen as second-class citizens by his congregation.

The cleanup efforts have created further controversy in the township, with town attorneys noting the legal liability issues that could arise if volunteers permitted by the town to work on the property were to be injured. In 2011, the New Jersey Synod of the Evangelical Lutheran Church in America contacted the township to propose a property transfer which would allow the town to authorize cleanups of the cemetery and stabilization of the church ruins. In November 2013, the Synod stated that it would sell the property to a non-profit organization of the historian groups and the township for $1. The deed to the property was transferred to the nonprofit Mount Amwell Project.
