= Ufferman Site =

Archaeological site in Ohio, United States

- U.S. National Register of Historic Places
- Location: Eastern bank of the Olentangy River
- Nearest city: Delaware, Ohio
- Area: 2 acres (0.81 ha)
- NRHP reference No.: 74001464
- Added to NRHP: July 24, 1974

The Ufferman Site (also known as the A. Sawyer Site, and designated 33DL12) is an archaeological site in the central part of the U.S. state of Ohio. Located north of the city of Delaware, it occupies approximately 2 acres (0.81 ha) of land near Delaware Lake on property near to the boundaries of Delaware State Park. It appears to have been the location of a village of the Cole culture, which inhabited the region during the later portion of the Woodland period. Ufferman lies only 0.6 kilometres (0.37 mi) south of the W.S. Cole Site, the type site for the culture, and approximately 23 kilometres (14 mi) north of the Highbank Park Works, which are believed to have been built by peoples of the Cole culture.

Although archaeologists have never excavated the Ufferman Site, numerous artifacts have been found because of the activities of local groundhogs. These animals favor the loose soil of the esker upon which the site lies, and their many diggings for their burrows have brought to the surface significant numbers of human and animal bones, pottery, and bits of stone.

In 1974, the Ufferman Site was listed on the National Register of Historic Places because of its archaeological value. The primary importance of the site is its ability to yield information about the Cole culture, which has been little understood until recent years. Fifty-five other historic locations in Delaware County are listed on the National Register, including four other archaeological sites. The Ufferman Site was one of the first of these places to be recognized as a historic site; only four other places — the Delaware County Courthouse and a historic district of three buildings (Elliott Hall, Sturges Library, and Merrick Hall) on the Ohio Wesleyan University campus in Delaware, the Spruce Run Earthworks near the village of Galena, and the Highbank Park Works near the city of Worthington — were listed on the Register before the Ufferman Site.
