= List of National Natural Landmarks in Ohio =

Map

There are 23 National Natural Landmarks in Ohio.

Name	Image	Date	Location	County	Ownership	Description
Arthur B. Williams Memorial Woods		1974	41.562282°N 81.426792°W	Cuyahoga	municipal	A remarkably pristine remnant beech-maple forest
Blacklick Woods		1974	39.937222°N 82.807778°W	Fairfield	county	An outstanding example of relatively undisturbed, old-growth beech-maple and swamp forest communities
Brown's Lake Bog		1967	40.6809°N 82.0624°W	Wayne	private	One of the few well-preserved, virgin boreal acid bogs remaining in a region where wetlands have been drained for agricultural use.
Buzzardroost Rock, Lynx Prairie, The Wilderness		1967	38.759381°N 83.407013°W	Adams	private	Supports many rare or uncommon species and it has an almost 50- year history of scientific observations.
Cedar Bog		1967	40.059444°N 83.795556°W	Champaign	state	An excellent example of a marl swamp. Part of Cedar Bog State Nature Preserve.
Clear Fork Gorge		1967	40.610982°N 82.286827°W	Ashland	state	Clearly illustrates evidence of stream reversal due to the Wisconsin glacier. Located in Mohican State Park.
Clifton Gorge		1967	39.793903°N 83.831525°W	Greene	state	Exemplary of interglacial and postglacial canyon-cutting into the dolomites of the Niagara Escarpment. Part of Clifton Gorge State Nature Preserve.
Crall Woods		1974	41.028219°N 82.434376°W	Ashland	private	A near-virgin remnant of maple-basswood-beech forest-type.
Cranberry Bog		1968	39.931545°N 82.468232°W	Licking	state	The only known bog of its type in existence. Part of Cranberry Bog State Nature Preserve.
Dysart Woods	Dysart Woods	1967	39.9846°N 80.9976°W	Belmont	state	One of the finest remaining examples of the white oak forests of eastern Ohio. Managed by Ohio University.
Fort Hill State Memorial	Fort Hill State Memorial	1974	Hillsboro39.1131°N 83.4063°W	Highland	state	Excellent outcrops of Silurian, Devonian, and Mississippian sedimentary bedrock and a natural bridge.
Glacial Grooves State Memorial		1967	41.616304°N 82.70652°W	Erie	state	Very large limestone glacial grooves.
Glen Helen Natural Area		1965	39.804125°N 83.881697°W	Greene	private	Includes a waterfall that carved a large travertine bowl around its pool.
Goll Woods		1974	41.554294°N 84.361738°W	Fulton	state	One of the best remaining examples of an oak-hickory dominated forest in Ohio. Part of Goll Woods State Nature Preserve.
Hazelwood Botanical Preserve		1974		Hamilton	state	Highly detailed study of the site's plant ecology was published in 1929. Managed by the University of Cincinnati.
Highbanks Natural Area		1980	40.143889°N 83.028333°W	Delaware, Franklin	county	A forested bluff overlooking the Olentangy River.
Holden Natural Area		1967		Geauga, Lake	private	A complex of three natural areas.
Hueston Woods		1967	39.5725°N 84.741389°W	Butler, Preble	state	A noteworthy example of beech-maple climax forest that has never been cut. Located in Hueston Woods State Park.
Mantua Swamp		1976	41.280278°N 81.211389°W	Portage	private	Contains many different wetland communities.
Mentor Marsh		1964	41.729164°N 81.305492°W	Lake	state	Consists of marsh vegetation, aquatic plants, swamp and bottomland forest, and upland forest. Part of Mentor Marsh State Nature Preserve.
Serpent Mound Cryptoexplosive Structure		1980	39.033333°N 83.4°W	Adams, Highland, Pike	private	A structure of undetermined origin exposed by differential erosion.
Tinker's Creek Gorge		1967	41.365°N 81.609722°W	Cuyahoga	municipal	Contains a virgin oak-hickory and virgin beech-maple-hemlock forest.
White Pine Bog Forest		1976		Geauga	municipal, private	The only remaining near-virgin remnant white pine boreal bog in Ohio.

== See also ==
- List of National Historic Landmarks in Ohio
