= Highbanks Metro Park =

Park and nature preserve in Lewis Center, Ohio, U.S.

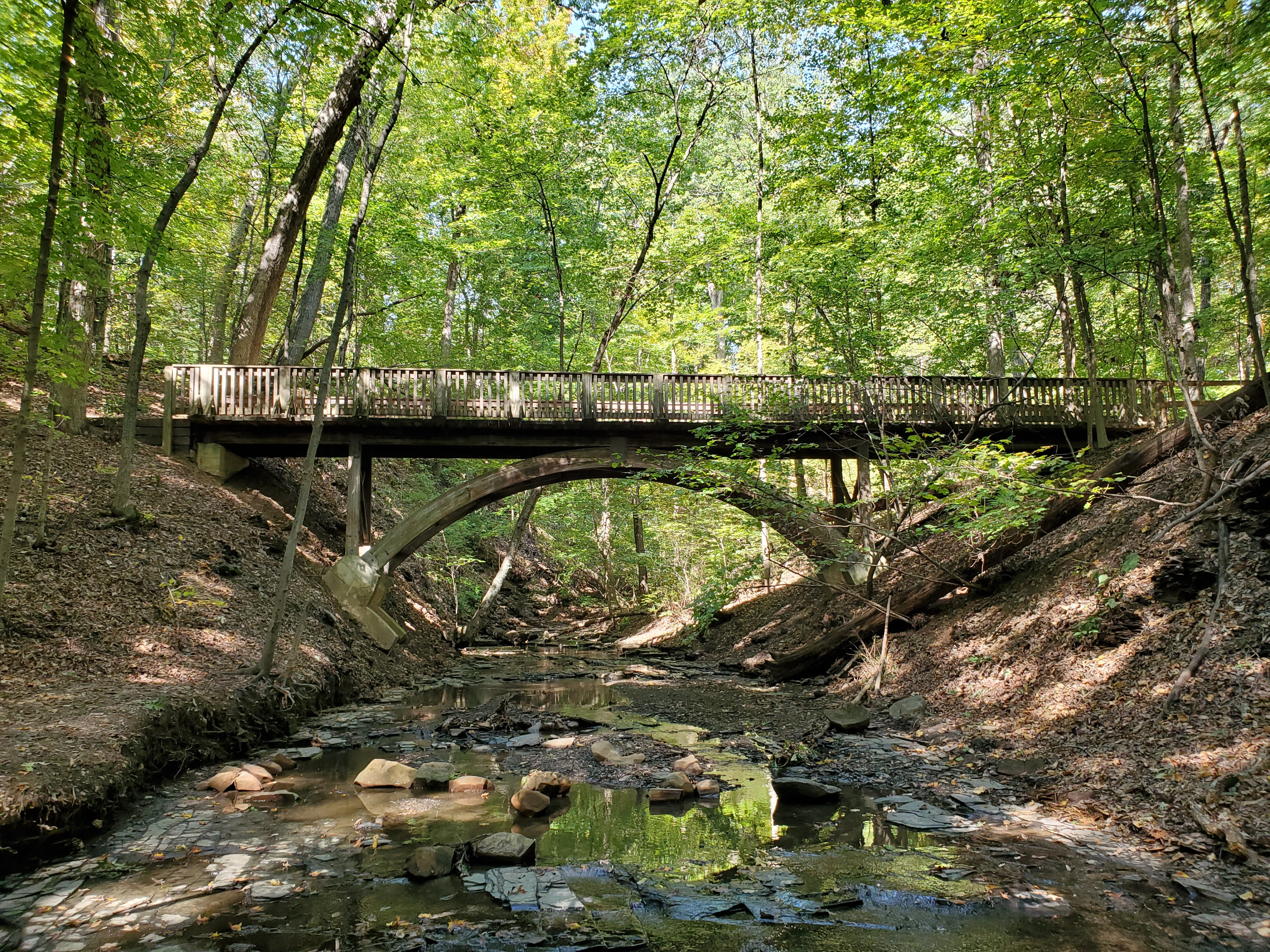
- An arch bridge carrying a trail in the park
- Interactive map of Highbanks Metro Park
- Type: Metro park
- Location: 9466 Columbus Pike, Lewis Center, Ohio
- Coordinates: 40.145365°N 83.027064°W
- Area: 1,200 acres (490 ha)
- Opened: September 22, 1973
- Administrator: Columbus and Franklin County Metro Parks
- Visitors: ~1 million annually
- Open: Year-round
- Paths: 10
- Habitats: Forest, fields, meadows
- Parking: Multiple lots
- Facilities: Nature center, picnic shelters, play equipment, sledding hill
- Website: Official website

U.S. National Natural Landmark
- Designated: 1980

Highbanks Metro Park is a metropolitan park in Central Ohio, owned and operated by Columbus and Franklin County Metro Parks. The park is named for its steep banks along the Olentangy River, the park's most unique feature. Highbanks also features ten trails, picnic space, a nature center, sledding hill, and nature preserve. It also includes numerous ancient burial mounds and earthworks from the indigenous Adena culture.

The park was established in 1973, and named a National Natural Landmark seven years later. In 2017, the park's River Bluff Area opened to the public.

== Attributes ==
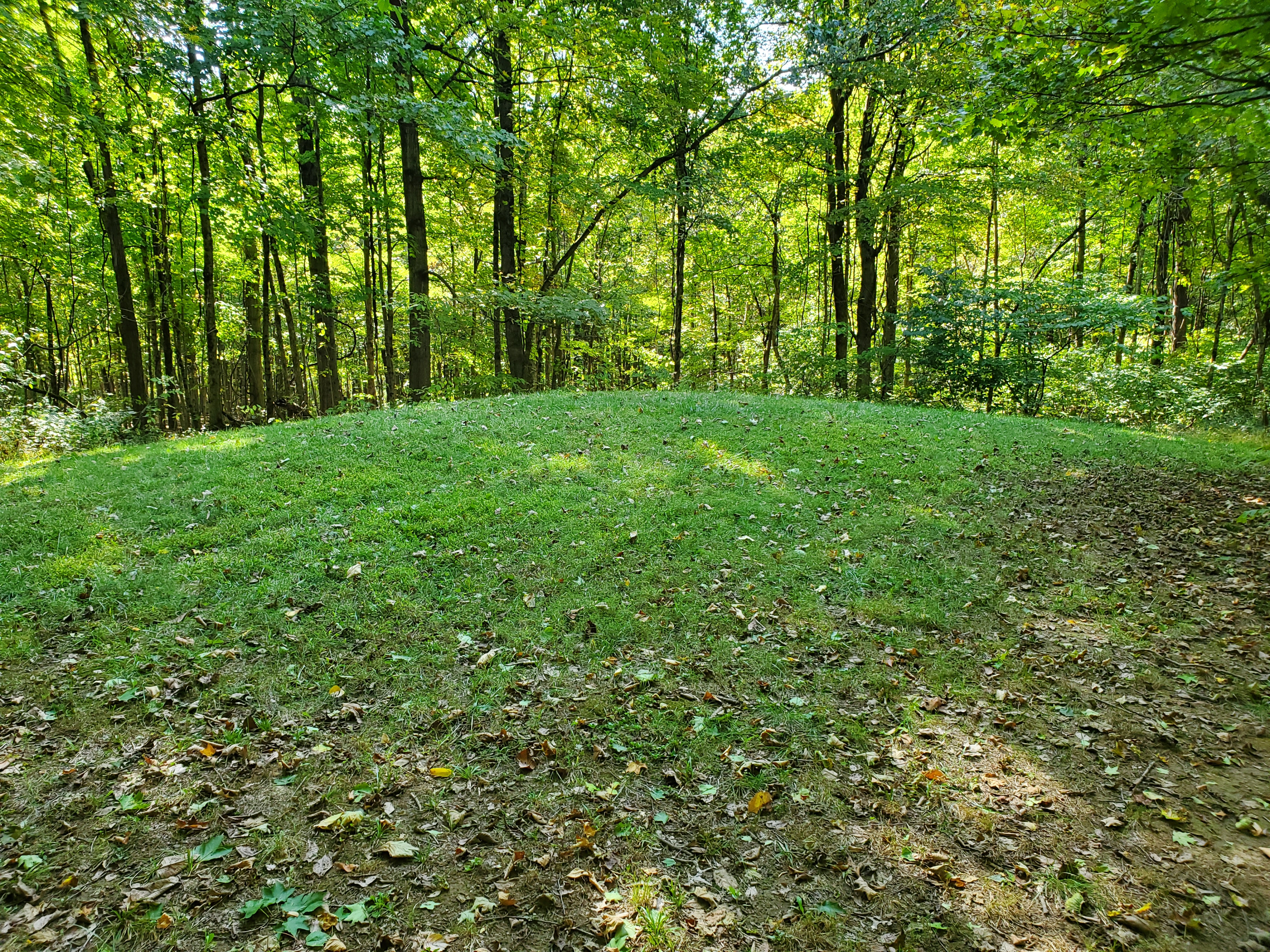
Highbanks Metropolitan Park Mound II

The park is located in northern Franklin County and southern Delaware County, within several townships. It is beside U.S. Route 23 and near Lewis Center, an unincorporated community.

Highbanks Metro Park is the most visited in the Columbus and Franklin County Metro Parks system. It has about 1 million visitors per year.

Highbanks contains unique natural features, including its namesake bluffs that overlook the Olentangy River, some as tall as 110 ft (34 m). The bluffs are made up of limestone, Ohio black shale, and Olentangy shale. An observation deck lets visitors look out across the ravine, something pre-Columbian natives were known to do to keep a lookout.

Within the park is a large nature center, a sledding hill, a natural play area, Adena culture mounds, and the 206-acre (83 ha) Edward F. Hutchins State Nature Preserve. Highbanks has ten trails, ranging from 0.3 miles to 3.5 miles. Several are paved, while others have grass, gravel, or dirt paths.

Two earthworks located in the park, the Highbanks Metropolitan Park Mounds I and II and the Highbank Park Works, are listed on the National Register of Historic Places.

The park also includes a small graveyard. A portion of the park property was home to Joseph and Sally Pool, a pioneer family that moved there in 1812, and had 13 children. The family's original burial site is lost, though their headstones were found stacked off-site, and recreated within the park. The graveyard is the last known pioneer family graveyard in Sharon Township.

=== Natural features ===
Highbanks is home to two nesting bald eagles, a pair that have hatched eaglets since 2010. The park also features two large sycamore trees; the trees are 23–24 feet in circumference, and reportedly 500 years old. Many other trees are of mature ages, about 150 years, including oaks, maples, hickories, and beech trees.

Highbanks has unique geological features, including concretions in some riverbeds, sometimes with fossils inside. Some rocks in the park date to 350 million years. Deep ravines there date to 10,000 years, carved by glacial meltwater.

== History ==
The site that would become Highbanks was first identified as prime parkland in the 1945 report proposing a Metropolitan Park System for Franklin County. In 1948 the first 75-acre tract of land was purchased for the park. This tract included an overlook of the 100-foot shale bluffs and two ancient earthworks by the Cole culture. In 1964 and 1965, the Metro Parks purchased adjacent land and began planning for the park.

The park opened September 22, 1973 as the fifth Metro Park. Highbanks was designated as a National Natural Landmark in 1980. In the 1990s, more features were added, including a large wetland, new trails, picnic area, sledding hill, and the Highbanks Nature Center.

In 2017, the park's River Bluff Area opened.

== See also ==
- List of National Natural Landmarks in Ohio
