= Williamsville, Ohio =

Coordinates: 40°10′14″N 83°01′09″W

Williamsville is a ghost town in Orange Township, Delaware County, Ohio, United States, first laid out by Anson Williams in 1836, the village included 80 lots positioned on both sides of the Columbus and Sandusky Turnpike but would ultimately become abandoned.
