= Highbank Park Works =

Archaeological site in Ohio, United States

- U.S. National Register of Historic Places
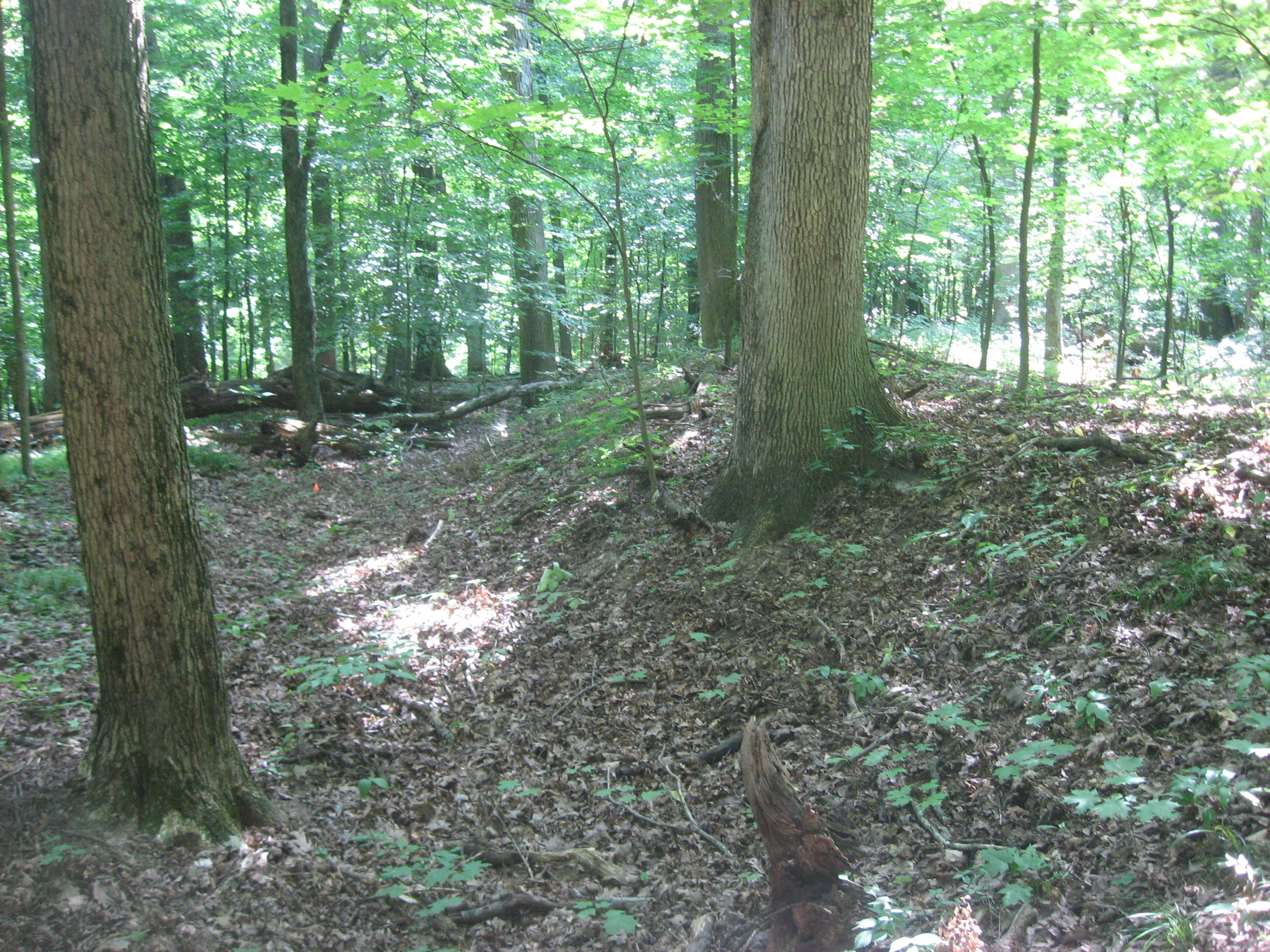
- Trees grow atop the works
- Interactive map of Highbank Park Works
- Nearest city: Delaware, Ohio
- Coordinates: 40°8′27.6″N 83°1′51.6″W
- Area: 13 acres (5.3 ha)
- NRHP reference No.: 74001466
- Added to NRHP: February 15, 1974

The Highbank Park Works (also known as the Orange Township Works) is a complex of earthworks and a potential archaeological site located within Highbanks Metro Park in Central Ohio in the United States. The park is in southernmost Delaware County on the east bank of the Olentangy River. The site is a semi-elliptical embankment, consisting of four sections, each 3 feet (0.91 m) high, and bordered by a shallow ditch. Two ravines and a 100-foot-high shale bluff surround the earthworks. It is thought to have been constructed sometime between 800 and 1300 CE by members of the Cole culture. The earthworks have seen little disturbance since the first white settlement of the region; agriculture has never been practiced on their vicinity, and no significant excavation has ever been conducted at the site. One small excavation and field survey, conducted in 1951, yielded a few pieces of pottery and flakes of flint from a small midden. Another excavation was conducted in 2011 that focused mainly on site usage and constructing a timeline for the mounds.

The Highbank Park Works is one of several wall-and-ditch earthworks in central Ohio. Unlike Highbank, most of these complexes are known to be the work of people of the Hopewell tradition; however, the similarity between the works of the Hopewell and Cole peoples has led archaeologists to propose that the Cole were descended from the Hopewell. New research on the Cole culture suggests this was not a separate peoples, but in fact part of the larger Hopewell group.

Also located in Highbank Park are two subconical Adena era mounds. These two mounds are known as the Highbanks Park Mound I (also known as the Muma Mound) and Highbanks Park Mound II (also known as the Orchard Mound or the Selvey Mound). The two mounds are not located within the embankment, but are about 0.5 and 1 mile away.

In 1974, the Highbank Park Works were listed on the National Register of Historic Places because of their archaeological significance. Three other Delaware County archaeological sites are listed on the Register: the Ufferman Site, the site of a former Cole village; the Highbanks Park Mounds, and the Adena Spruce Run Earthworks.

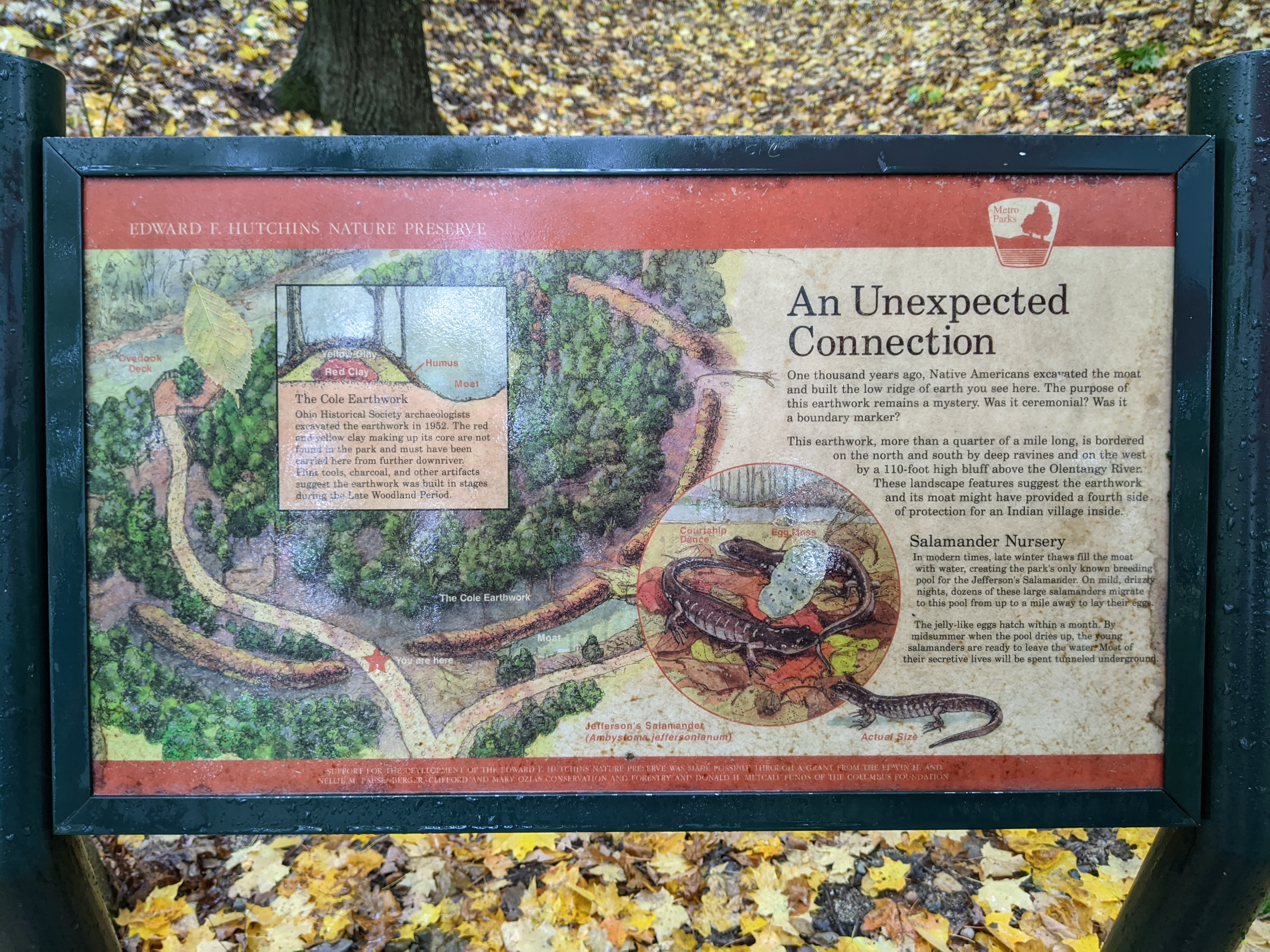
Sign on-site

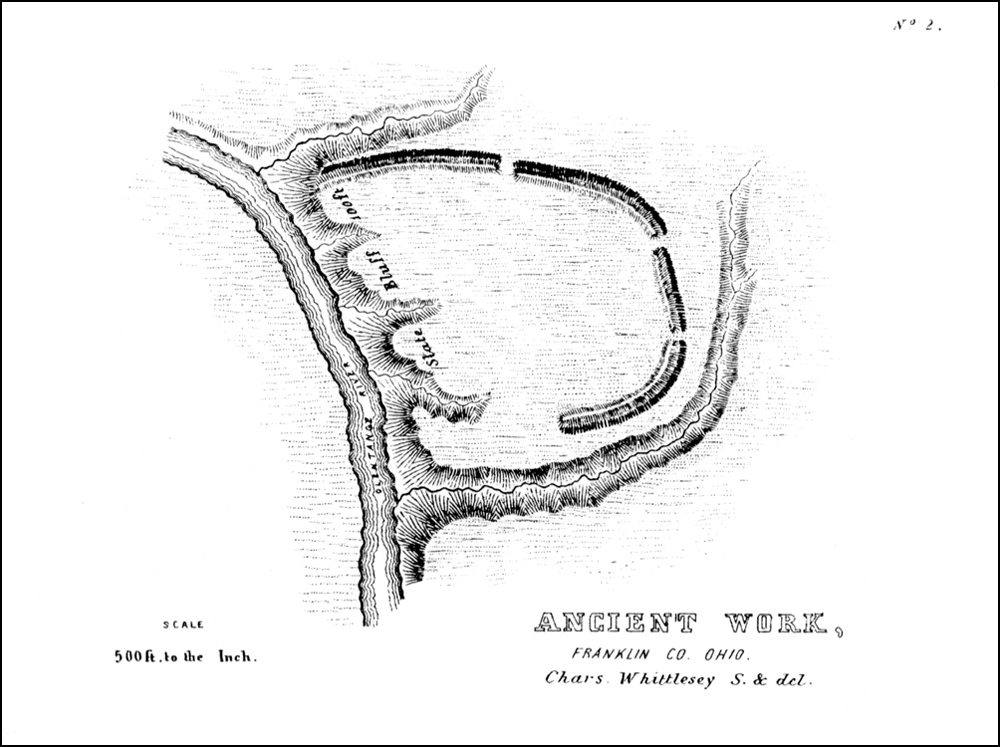
Squire and Davis engraving of the embankment

== See also ==
- Carl Potter Mound
- Fort Ancient culture
- Monongahela culture
