= Delaware Township, Delaware County, Ohio =

Township in Ohio, US

- Township
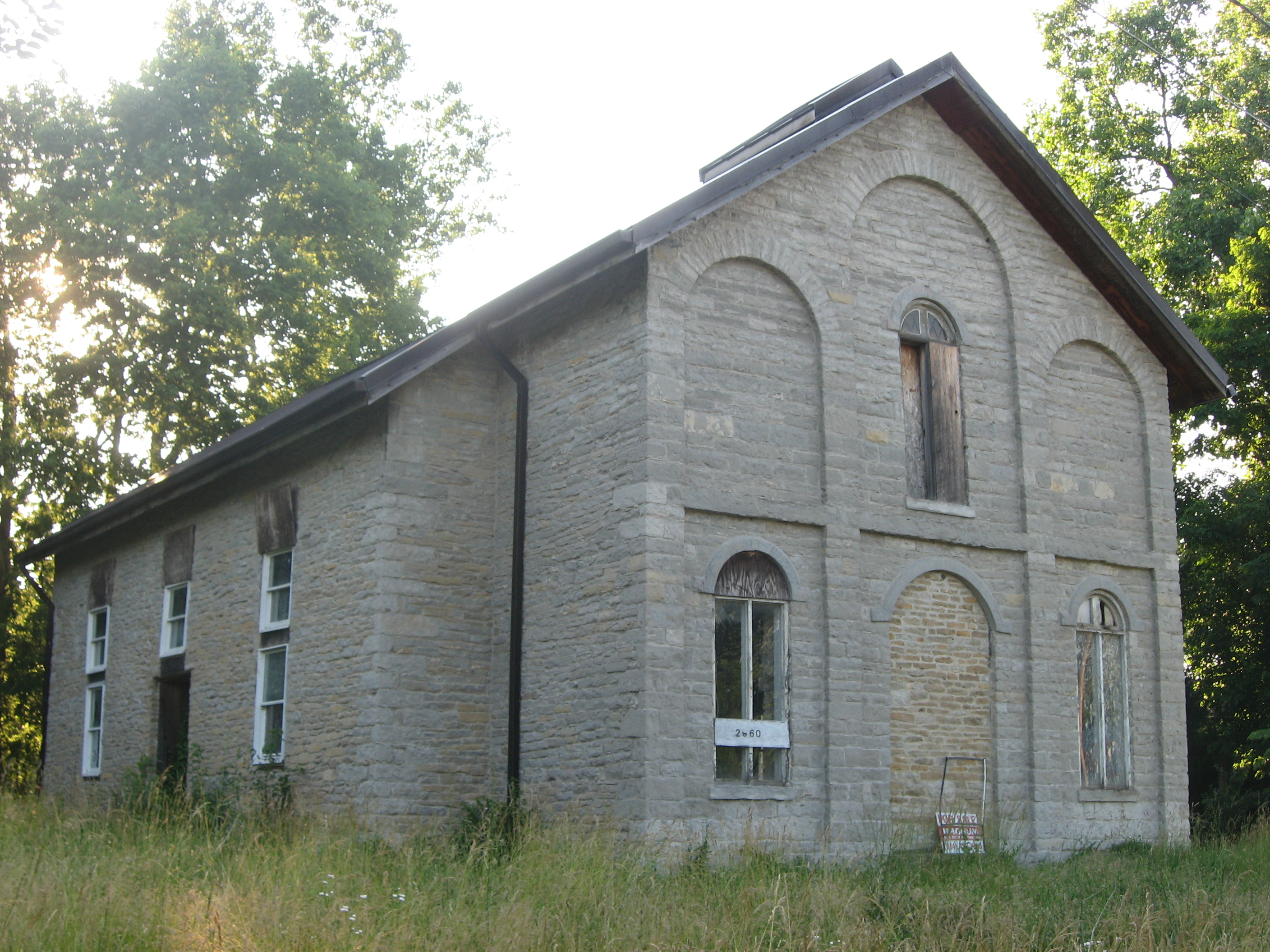
- Former Stratford Methodist Episcopal Church

- Location of Delaware Township in Delaware County
- Coordinates: 40°17′49″N 83°4′20″W
- Country: United States
- State: Ohio
- County: Delaware

Area
  - Total: 10.9 sq mi (28.2 km^{2})
  - Land: 10.8 sq mi (28.0 km^{2})
  - Water: 0.077 sq mi (0.2 km^{2})
- Elevation: 890 ft (270 m)

Population (2020)
  - Total: 2,713
  - Density: 251/sq mi (96.9/km^{2})
- Time zone: UTC-5 (Eastern (EST))
  - Summer (DST): UTC-4 (EDT)
- ZIP code: 43015
- Area code: 740
- FIPS code: 39-21448
- GNIS feature ID: 1086046
- Website: www.delawaretownshipohio.org

Delaware Township is one of the eighteen townships of Delaware County, Ohio, United States. The population at the 2020 census was 2,713.

== Geography ==
Located in the western part of the county, it borders the following townships:

- Troy Township - north
- Brown Township - northeast
- Berlin Township - southeast
- Liberty Township - south
- Concord Township - southwest
- Scioto Township - west
- Radnor Township - northwest

Most of Delaware Township is occupied by the city of Delaware, the county seat of Delaware County.

== Name and history ==
Statewide, other Delaware Townships are located in Defiance and Hancock counties.

== Government ==
The township is governed by a three-member board of trustees, who are elected in November of odd-numbered years to a four-year term beginning on the following January 1. Two are elected in the year after the presidential election and one is elected in the year before it. There is also an elected township fiscal officer, who serves a four-year term beginning on April 1 of the year after the election, which is held in November of the year before the presidential election. Vacancies in the fiscal officership or on the board of trustees are filled by the remaining trustees.

== Public services ==
Emergency medical services in Delaware Township are provided by the Delaware County EMS.
