= Orange Township, Delaware County, Ohio =

Township in Ohio, US

- Township
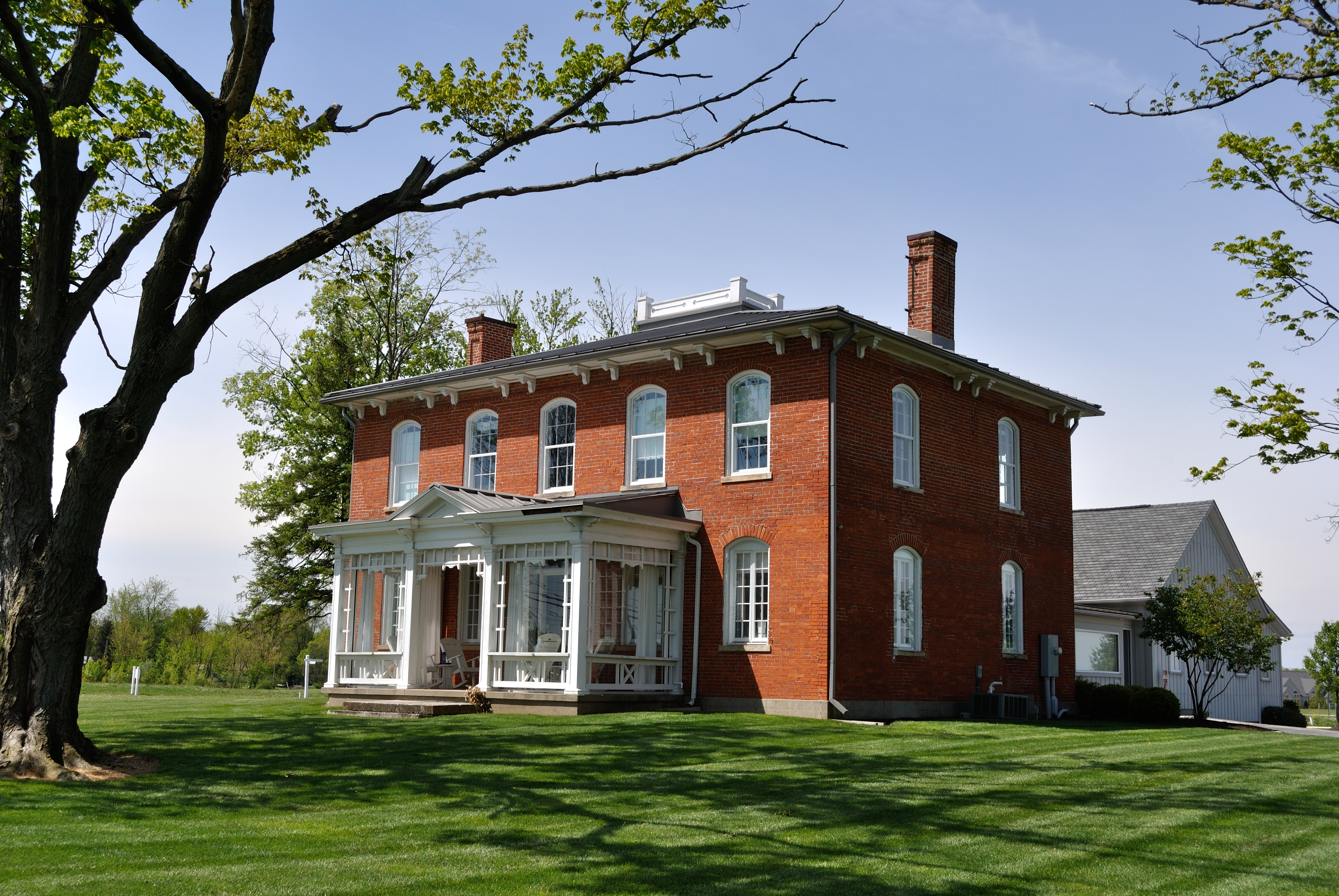
- Gooding House and Tavern

- Location of Orange Township in Delaware County
- Coordinates: 40°10′5″N 82°59′40″W
- Country: United States
- State: Ohio
- County: Delaware

Area
  - Total: 22.8 sq mi (59.0 km^{2})
  - Land: 21.0 sq mi (54.5 km^{2})
  - Water: 1.7 sq mi (4.5 km^{2})
- Elevation: 928 ft (283 m)

Population (2020)
  - Total: 37,452
  - Density: 1,780/sq mi (687/km^{2})
- Time zone: UTC-5 (Eastern (EST))
  - Summer (DST): UTC-4 (EDT)
- FIPS code: 39-58618
- GNIS feature ID: 1086052
- Website: www.orangetwp.org

Orange Township is one of the eighteen townships of Delaware County, Ohio, United States. The 2020 census found 37,452 people in the township.

== Geography ==
Located in the southern part of the county, it borders the following townships and city:

- Berlin Township - north
- Berkshire Township - northeast corner
- Genoa Township - east
- Westerville - southeast
- Sharon Township, Franklin County - south
- Perry Township, Franklin County - southwest corner
- Liberty Township - west

Several populated places are located in Orange Township:

- Part of the city of Columbus, the capital of Ohio, in the south
- Part of the city of Westerville, in the southeast
- The unincorporated community of Lewis Center, in the northwest

An unpopulated place, Williamsville, is a ghost town.

== Name and history ==
Organized in 1816, it is one of six Orange Townships statewide.

== Government ==
The township is governed by a three-member board of trustees, who are elected in November of odd-numbered years to a four-year term beginning on the following January 1. Two are elected in the year after the presidential election and one is elected in the year before it. There is also an elected fiscal officer, who serves a four-year term beginning on April 1 of the year after the election, which is held in November of the year before the presidential election. Vacancies in the fiscal officership or on the board of trustees are filled by the remaining trustees. The Township is serviced by the full-time Orange Township Fire Department. There is no police department, but policing services are offered by the Delaware County Sheriff's Office. Services, such as snow removal, street maintenance and signage are offered with the Orange Township service department.

== Demographics ==
=== 2020 census ===
Orange Township racial composition
Race	Number	Percentage
White (NH)	23,886	63.8%
Black or African American (NH)	2,131	5.69%
Native American (NH)	63	0.17%
Asian (NH)	7,359	19.6%
Pacific Islander (NH)	10	0.03%
Other/mixed	2,666	7.12%
Hispanic or Latino	1,337	3.57%

== Education ==
Children from Orange Township attend the Olentangy Local School District.

== Parks ==
Orange Township has many parks, including an aquatic center that has a leisure pool with a kids area, water slides and a lap pool. Alum Creek State Park is also located within Orange Township, with access to boating, beach area and walking paths.

== Notable persons ==
- Frederick S. Nave, Arizona territorial judge, was born in Lewis Center in 1873.
- Frank B. Willis, Governor of Ohio from 1915 to 1917, was born in Lewis Center in 1871.
- Farida A. Wiley, American naturalist, ornithologist and educator
