= Highbanks Metropolitan Park Mounds I and II =

Two archaeological sites in central Ohio, US

- U.S. National Register of Historic Places
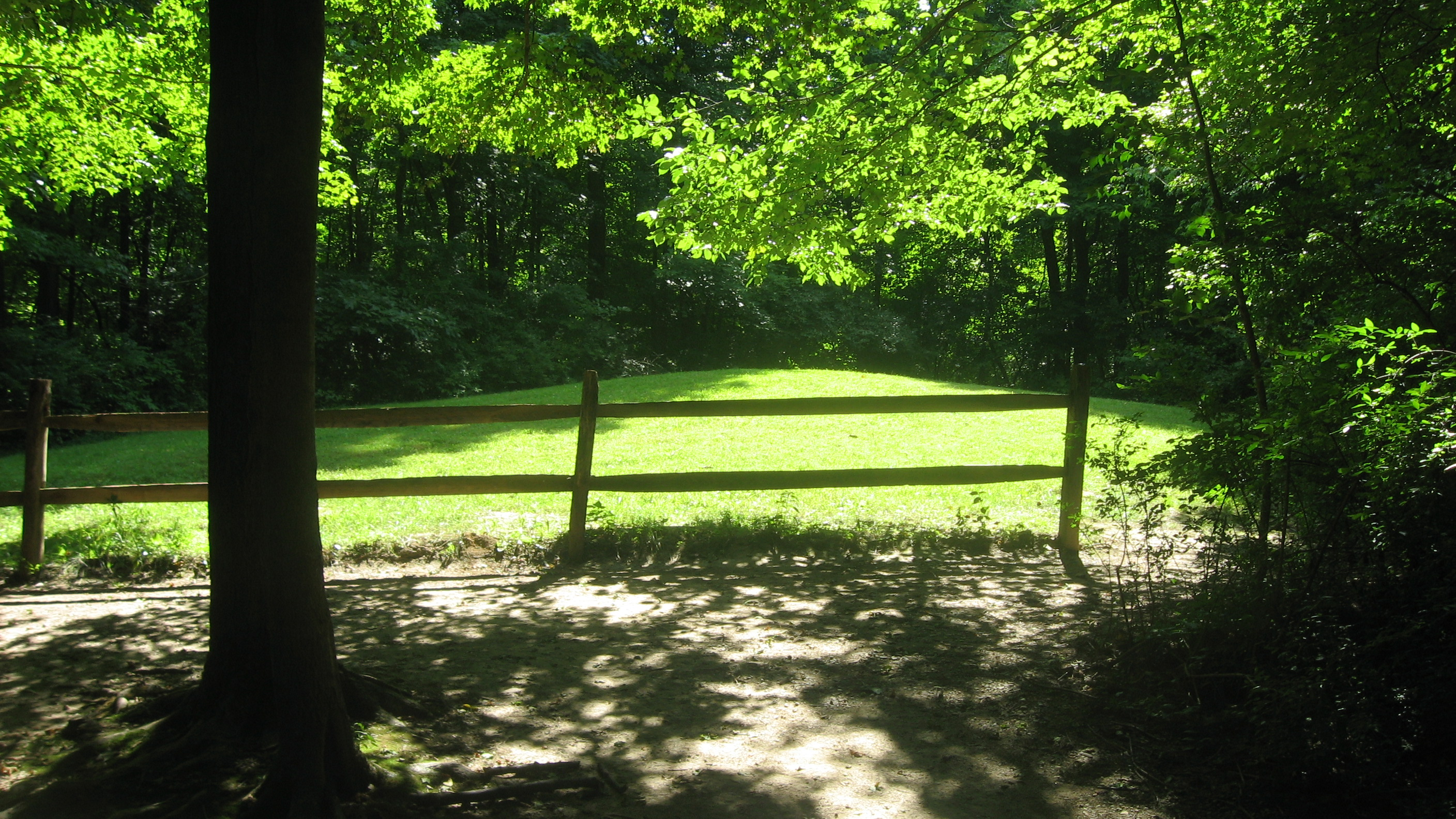
- The southern mound
- Interactive map of Highbanks Metropolitan Park Mounds I and II
- Nearest city: Powell, Ohio
- Coordinates: 40°9′23.004″N 83°1′26.4714″W
- Area: 175 acres (71 ha)
- NRHP reference No.: 75001375
- Added to NRHP: March 19, 1975

The Highbanks Metropolitan Park Mounds I and II (also known as the Muma Mound and the Orchard Mound or the Selvey Mound) are two archaeological sites located within Highbanks Metro Park in Central Ohio in the United States. The park is in southernmost Delaware County on the east bank of the Olentangy River. The subconical mounds are believed to have been built by the Adena culture.

Also located in the park is a semi-elliptical embankment, the Highbank Park Works, which consists of four three-foot-high sections bordered by a shallow ditch. It is thought to have been constructed sometime between 800 and 1300 CE by members of the Cole culture.

The site was surveyed by Ephraim George Squier and Edwin Hamilton Davis in 1846. They discuss the site in their 1848 book, Ancient Monuments of the Mississippi Valley.

== See also ==
- Highbank Park Works
