= Gooding House and Tavern =

Historic house in Ohio, United States

- U.S. National Register of Historic Places
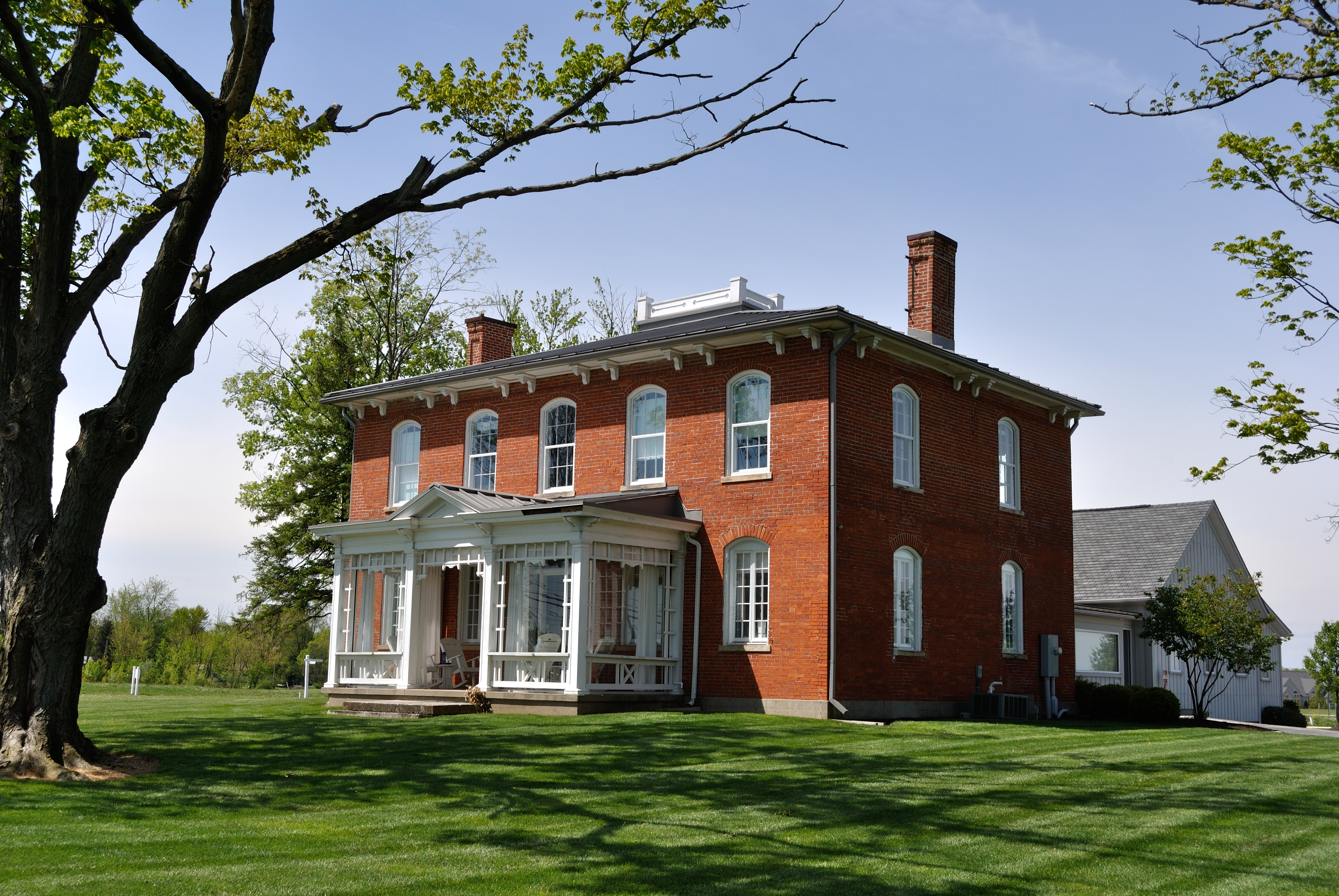

- Location within Ohio Location within the United States
- Location: Orange Township, Ohio
- Coordinates: 40°10′53″N 83°1′29″W
- Built: 1827
- Architectural style: Federal, Italianate
- NRHP reference No.: 05000753
- Added to NRHP: July 27, 2005

The Gooding House and Tavern has a long and storied history that begins with its genesis as the home of George B. Gooding, who amassed a large amount of farmland and used his home as a stagecoach stop and tavern during the earliest years of Delaware County's development. Also known as "Halfway House" and the "Gooding Tavern," this property was well situated on what is now U.S. Route 23 previously known as "Mud Pike", about halfway between the town of Worthington, Ohio on the south and the town of Delaware, Ohio on the north. Owned by the Gooding family for 175 years, this farmstead and tavern played an important role in the commercial development of Orange Township and Delaware County during the 19th century and early 20th century. The property demonstrates the broad pattern of Ohio's transportation-related commerce in the early 19th century, when inns and taverns were built to accommodate and sustain the traveler.

The Gooding House provides an example of the architectural evolution of a property from Ohio's settlement period, through the more prosperous years of the mid-19th century, to the changes brought by the early 20th century. The building exhibits significant architectural features from each of these three periods: 1820s Federal influences, 1850s early Italianate influences, and 1910s Colonial Revival and Craftsman influences. Each era was important to the architectural evolution of the property as it was occupied by succeeding generations of the Gooding family.

== The Gooding family and property history ==
George B. Gooding, born in 1796 in Massachusetts, built the Gooding House and Tavern. In 1826, Gooding purchased 250 acres (100 ha) bounded on the east by the north–south road that was to become the Columbus-Sandusky Turnpike that same year. Anticipating increased traffic and a good business opportunity, George Gooding built a tavern facing the road in 1827.

In addition to running the tavern, George Gooding was expanding his farm, becoming well known as one of the most productive Delaware County farmers of the early 19th century. By 1850, Gooding amassed about 1,000 acres (400 ha) on both sides of U.S. 23, and his farm produced about 300 pounds (100 kg) of wool, 900 pounds (400 kg) of butter and 1,000 pounds (500 kg) of cheese yearly.

The Gooding family held the property until 2001 when it was sold, ending 175 years of continuous family ownership.

The property was restored in 2007 and today houses a media buying company (Strategic Media Placement), a post-production company, Brick Editorial Boutique & Studio, and a media company, The Strategy Group for Media.

== Gooding Tavern history ==
George B. Gooding's tavern was also known as "Halfway House," reflecting its strategic location halfway between Worthington and Delaware. Given the difficulties of stagecoach and wagon travel over the Columbus Pike, the Gooding Tavern was a principal and popular stop on the route between these two towns. Among the stories told about the house, it is said that Mrs. Gooding "made 40 pies at a time and would place them in the ice house, which still sits behind the house, to cool. In the winter, ice would be cut from the river and laid down in the sawdust in the ice house to keep the food through the hot summer." It is also reported that General William Henry Harrison stayed at the Gooding Tavern on his way to his inaugural in 1841.

== Architectural development and context ==
The original Gooding Tavern building had a Flemish bond facade and was 5 bays wide. If it was a two-story building, the upper floor was removed and rebuilt c. 1854. It is also possible that it was only one story or 1½ story high, and was greatly expanded at mid-century. The tax records indicate a change in the value of the Gooding House in the mid-1850s. The tax assessment had remained constant during the 1840s, but dropped off in 1854 to $450, followed by a significant jump to $1800 in 1855. The huge jump between 1854 and 1855 indicates that significant improvements were made to the house in 1854.

At the age of 58, George Gooding appeared to be prospering as a farmer. The addition of railroad transportation to Orange Station in 1850, the construction of the east–west connecting Gooding Road, now Orange Road, in the 1840s and early 1850s, and the continuing use of the building as a tavern (a "license to keep tavern" was issued to George Gooding in 1853) all contributed to the ability of George Gooding to make improvements to his property. The change from Flemish bond pattern brick on the first story to common bond pattern brick on the second story provides evidence that the second floor was built after the Federal period. Early Italianate characteristics include the wide eaves with carved brackets, the segmental arch windows with six-over-six sash; and the front entry enframement. On the interior, the front stair handrail and newel post appear to date from the mid-19th century, as does the heavily molded woodwork on the second floor.

The Gooding House and Tavern was under the ownership of Harry Gooding, George Gooding's grandson, when the significant 1917 alterations took place. At that time, Harry Gooding was continuing to farm the property. Ninety years had passed since his grandfather had first built a tavern here, and as many as 60 years had elapsed since the house had been expanded and perhaps updated. Much had changed in those years, including electrification and indoor plumbing, not to mention architectural tastes and styles. The Colonial Revival style was gaining popularity, along with the Arts and Crafts movement of the teens and twenties. Harry Gooding made a major investment in the home in 1916–1917, completely transforming the first floor with the addition of casement replacement windows, elaborate window and door trim, new exterior and interior doors, wall and ceiling paneling, new fireplace mantles, and built-in cupboards, casework and seating. A large double casement window with window seat was added to the dining room. Bathrooms on first and second floors were added then, and the kitchen was updated as well.

== Tavern context ==
The Gooding House and Tavern is an example of a four-over-four building type that reflects its early origins as a tavern. Its massing and plan are common to early-19th-century taverns and inns that were found in rural areas along the National Road and other early roads in Ohio

Small-scale rural taverns often had common floor plan features. When George Gooding made his modifications to the house in 1854, it was still being used as a tavern. The 1917 modifications made by his grandson signal a different era in the history of the property, when the road in front was paved and the automobile was an increasingly common sight.

== Summary ==
In summary, the Gooding House and Tavern has evolved from its beginnings as an early-19th-century tavern, incorporating architectural changes as it was passed to succeeding generations of the same family over 175 years. It remains a significant remnant of the early rural history of the Orange Township in Delaware County. The building served as a tavern for approximately 30 years in the early 19th century, contributing significantly to the patterns of transportation commerce that existed along the Columbus and Sandusky Pike during that period. The home continued in the ownership of the same family for the next 145 years, with modifications made that illustrate important architectural trends during different periods of history, most notably the mid-19th century and early 20th century. It retains its distinctive architectural character today.
