= Mentor Marsh =

Wetland in the state of Ohio, United States

- Location within Ohio Location within the United States
- Location: Lake County, Ohio
- Coordinates: 41.735°N 81.307°W
- Basin countries: United States
- Surface area: 829 acres (3.35 km^{2})

U.S. National Natural Landmark
- Designated: 1966

Mentor Marsh is a body of water in Lake County, Ohio, United States. It is a lakeshore wetland with marsh vegetation, aquatic plants, swamp and bottomland forest, and upland forest. Largely owned and managed by the Cleveland Museum of Natural History, it is protected by the state of Ohio as part of Mentor Marsh State Nature Preserve. The wetland is a National Natural Landmark located within the metropolitan area of Cleveland, Ohio. It was listed as a Landmark in 1966 and Ohio's first state nature preserve in 1971.

== History and description ==
The National Park Service describes Mentor Marsh as follows:

As a migration stopover and year-around habitat for birds and mammals, the site is a rarity in heavily populated northern Ohio.

The 800-acre area was originally an ancient river channel which became marshy, and then became a swamp forest, rich in all kinds of animal and plant life. In the 1960s, large amounts of salt mine waste were dumped into the Black Marsh Creek (a tributary of the marsh) by contractors hired by Morton Salt which killed nearly all the native plants and trees. This area was then invaded by phragmites, which left large amounts of dead and highly flammable material above ground leading to a wildfire in 2003 which burned more than 400 acres, including some of the installed boardwalks. In 2015 restoration efforts began with a buffer zone around the boardwalks, including the phragmites being cleared with herbicides and the plant material crushed into the ground to save them from future fires. Soon, native plants, whose seeds had been buried in the mud but were prevented from growing through the dense phragmites, sprung up by the dozens—over sixty in the first year. A native wild rice was discovered several years later by naturalist Becky Donaldson and identified as Southern wild rice. The seeds may have been dormant for as long as a century; by 2023, full rice beds had developed. In addition to native plant species, many rare bird species have returned to the marsh to nest including: American Bittern, Least Bittern, Virginia Rail, King Rail, Sora, Common Gallinule, and Wilsons's Snipe. Today, the Cleveland Museum of Natural History continues to monitor and treat phragmites populations in and around the marsh. along with other invasive species that are commonly found in wetland and upland environments.

== Visitors ==
Several hiking trails around the marsh are available along with activities including bird walks that are organized together with the Cleveland Museum of Natural History.
