= Stratford Methodist Episcopal Church =

- U.S. National Register of Historic Places
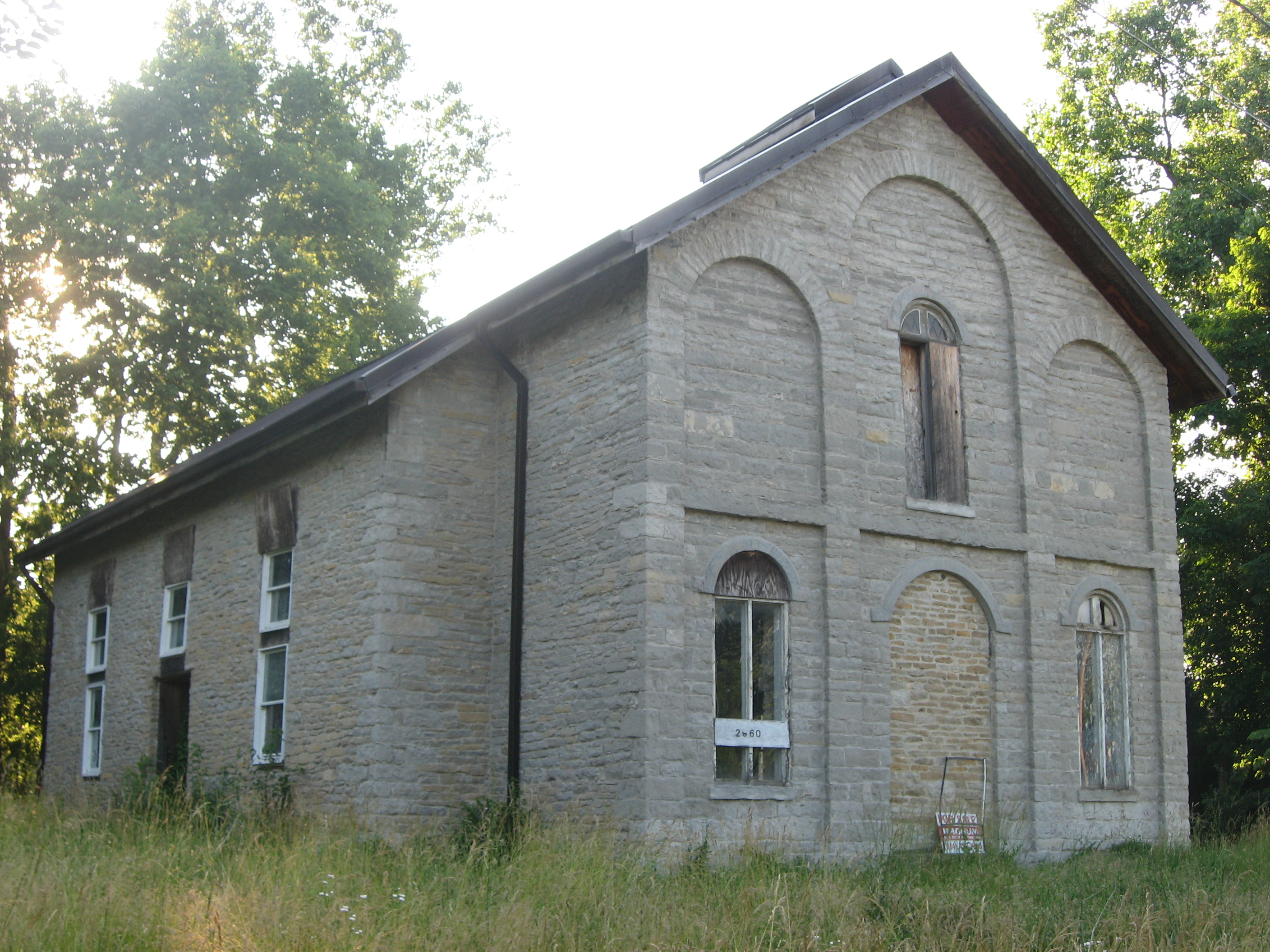
- Front and southern side

- Location within Ohio Location within the United States
- Location: Junction of U.S. Route 23 and State Route 315, south of Delaware, Ohio
- Coordinates: 40°15′22″N 83°3′49″W
- Area: Less than 1 acre (0.40 ha)
- Built: 1844
- Architectural style: Romanesque Revival
- MPS: Historic Mill-Related Resources of Delaware and Liberty Townships MPS
- NRHP reference No.: 91001436
- Added to NRHP: October 3, 1991

The Stratford Methodist Episcopal Church is a historic former church building located near the city of Delaware, Ohio, United States. Constructed in the 1840s for workers in a company town, it was home to a congregation of the Methodist Episcopal Church until the community faltered following the company's closure. Situated at the southern end of the company town, it remains prominent because of its architecture, and it has been named a historic site.

== History ==
In 1838, Caleb Howard and Hosea Williams bought a watermill on the Olentangy River near Delaware, with the goal of converting the property into industrial use as a pair of paper mills. Desirous of avoiding the poverty and slums so closely associated with burgeoning industry in the United Kingdom, the owners established a mill village with amenities to assist the workers. The first new buildings in the settlement were constructed by Howard and Williams, for it was to be a company town; they retained the tavern that was already on the property, and their contractors residences and a church for the workers. Continued growth mandated a more formal existence for the community, so it was platted in 1850 and given the name "Stratford" in honor of the Bard's hometown. The company's fortunes fell soon after the end of the Civil War; the 1870s saw production falter, as the mills were operating for just nine months per year in 1880, and by 1890 one was closed entirely. The company closed in 1896, and five years later the mills were sold to a local railroad company.

Stratford Methodist Church was built in 1842 with money from Hosea Williams and Hiram Andrews, who had replaced Caleb Howard in the company partnership; it was constructed on land given by one of its charter members, Forrest Meeker, who had sold to Williams and Howard most of the land needed for the mill village. Organized circa 1845, the congregation was attached to St. Paul's Methodist Church in Delaware during the latter half of the Civil War. Being financially dependent on the paper mill, the congregation closed in 1896 following the closure of the mills.

== Architecture ==
Stratford Methodist Church is built primarily of stone; the roof is metal, and various elements are made of asphalt and wood, but the dominating appearance is stone — limestone was used for the foundation, and the walls are composed of a mix of limestone and sandstone. The gabled facade is divided into three bays, with windows in the first-story side bays and in the second-story central bay. A short tower once sat on the peak of the roof near the front of the building; it was a frame structure. Among the most prominent components of the architecture are the large semicircular arches around the windows, piercing walls 5 feet (1.5 m) thick. Inside, the gabled roof is supported by an unusual structural system of king post trusses.

== Preservation ==
In late 1991, the former Stratford Methodist Church was listed on the National Register of Historic Places, qualifying because of its place in local history. It was part of a multiple property submission of buildings erected in Stratford's earliest years; all of the other buildings were residences. Crucial to its historic significance was its contribution to the community's built environment: the church is surrounded by a large open lot, which helps to demonstrate the rural context in which the village is located. Situated on the corner of the junction of U.S. Route 23 and State Route 315, the church lies at the southern end of the old village; an old boarding house sits just to the south, but all of the other original buildings, including several worker houses, are located well to the north.
