= Spruce Run (Delaware County, Ohio) =

Streams in Ohio, United States

Coordinates: 40°10′20″N 82°52′2″W

Spruce Run is the name of a series of streams located entirely within Delaware County, Ohio. The GNIS names them North Branch Spruce Run, South Branch Spruce Run and West Branch Spruce Run.

Spruce Run was named for the spruce trees along its course.

== See also ==
- List of rivers of Ohio
