= Delaware State Park =

Park in Ohio, USA

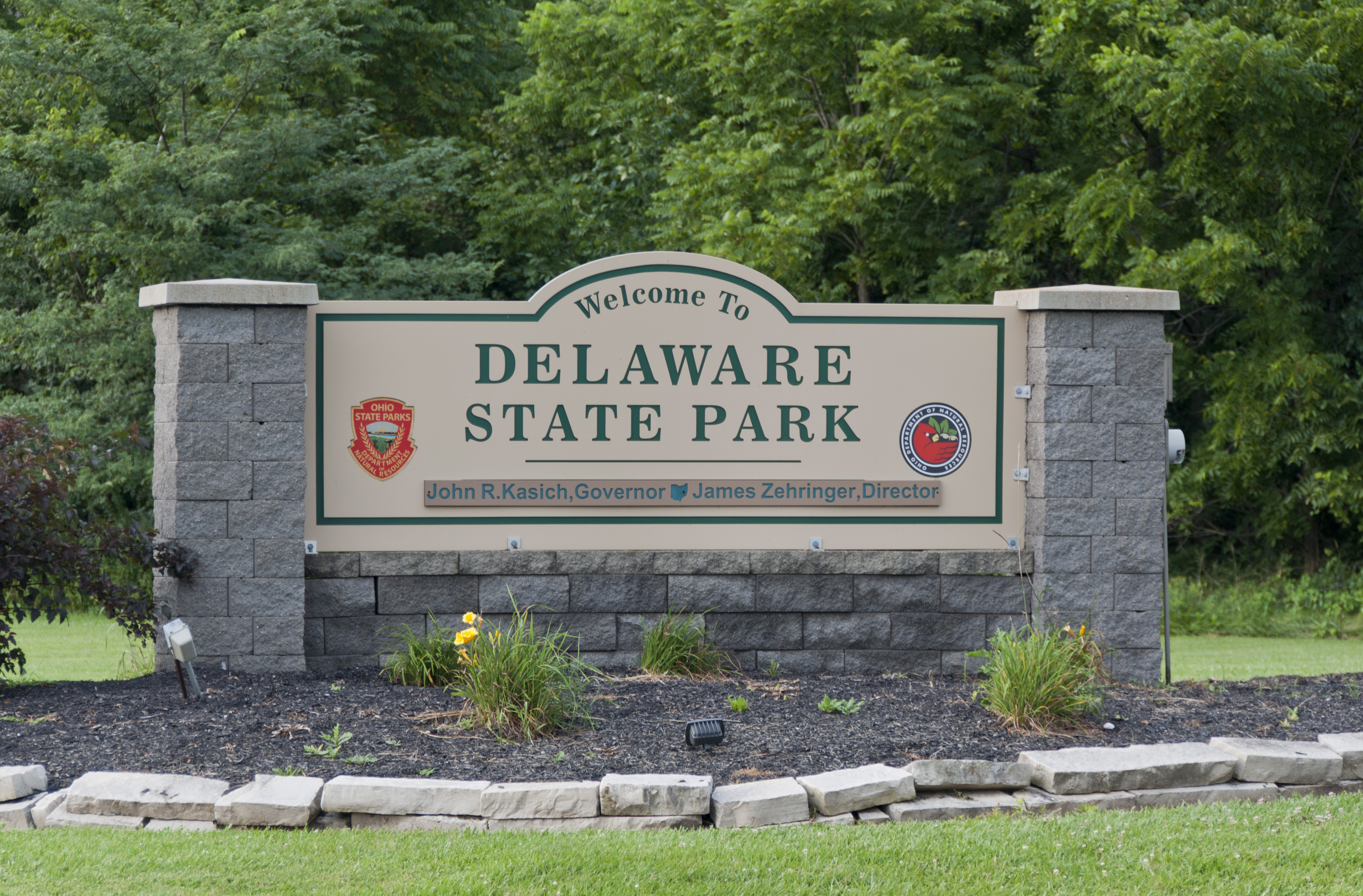
- The entrance to Delaware State Park

- Location within Ohio Location within the United States
- Interactive map of Delaware State Park
- Location: Delaware County, Ohio, United States
- Coordinates: 40°21′31″N 83°04′09″W
- Area: 1,686 acres (682 ha)
- Elevation: 899 feet (274 m)
- Established: 1952
- Administrator: Ohio Department of Natural Resources
- Designation: Ohio state park
- Named for: Delaware Indians
- Website: Delaware State Park

Delaware State Park is a 1,686-acre (682 ha) public recreation area on U.S. Route 23 near the city of Delaware in Delaware County, Ohio, in the United States. It is open for year-round recreation including camping, hiking, boating, hunting, fishing, and picnicking.

== History ==
The park, city, and county are named for the Delaware Indians (also known as the Lenape), a Native American tribe that originally lived along the Delaware River in Pennsylvania, Delaware, New York, Maryland, Connecticut and New Jersey. The Delawares were forced west by colonial settlers and were eventually forced further west by settlers of the Northwest Territory from which Ohio was established in 1803.

The Delawares were organized bands of Native American peoples with shared cultural and linguistic characteristics. Delaware State Park is named for them. It is just one of many places in the United States bearing the name "Delaware".

They lived in what is now New Jersey and along the Delaware River in Pennsylvania, the northern shore of Delaware, in the northeastern corner of Maryland, the panhandle of Connecticut and the lower Hudson Valley and New York Harbor in New York, at the time of the arrival of the Europeans in the 16th and 17th centuries.

The Treaty of Easton, signed between the Delawares and the English in 1766, removed them westward, out of present-day New York and New Jersey and into Western Pennsylvania and Ohio and beyond. The Delawares continually were crowded out by European settlers and pressed to move in several stages over a period of 176 years, with the main body arriving in the northeast region of Oklahoma in the 1860s. Along the way many smaller groups left, or were told to stay where they were, but not in Ohio. Consequently, today, the Delawares are spread from New Jersey to Wisconsin to southwest Oklahoma.

The Delaware did not leave Ohio without a fight. They joined a confederation of tribes led by Chief Pontiac and participated in what became known as Pontiac's Rebellion. They also joined Blue Jacket's confederation in the Northwest Indian War.

Anglo-American settlers moved into the area of Delaware State Park in the early 19th century. A wagon trail near what is now U.S. Route 23 brought settlers to the area. A tavern was constructed along the trail in 1810 on a small hill that is now part of the park. A palisade was built around the tavern in anticipation of the War of 1812. The tavern and palisade came to be known as Fort Morrow. The fort was never attacked but it did provide a sense of security for the settlers of the area. Today, the fort is an archaeological site; it is one of two such sites near the park that are listed on the National Register of Historic Places. The other site is the Ufferman Site, which was inhabited during the Late Woodland period of North American prehistory.

Delaware State Park was established in 1952 following the completion of Delaware Lake by the U.S. Army Corps of Engineers in 1951. The lake was built as part of the Flood Control Act of 1938. The dam on the Olentangy River is part of the Corps' Huntingdon district and helps control flooding along the Olentangy, Scioto and Ohio Rivers. It was built between 1947 and 1951 at a cost of $4,307,000.

== Ecology ==
Delaware State Park is surrounded by farm land. Before the land was cleared for farming it was an old-growth forest of beech and maple. The old forest was cut long ago, but a thriving second growth forest can be found in and around Delaware State Park. The woods provide habitat for white-tailed deer, fox squirrels, groundhogs, and pheasants.

== Recreation ==
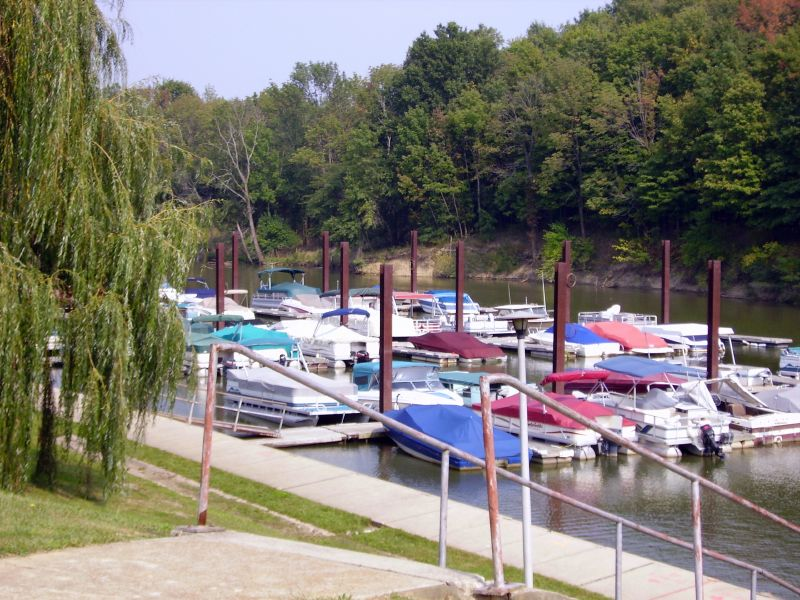
The marina at Delaware State Park

Delaware State Park is open for year-round recreation. Boats with unlimited horsepower are permitted on Delaware Lake which is also open to fishing and swimming in the designated swimming area. There is a marina that sells fuel as well as fishing and boating supplies. The lake is home to a variety of game fish including largemouth and smallmouth bass, crappie, and muskellunge. Waterfowl hunting is permitted along the lake. Numerous duck blinds are awarded through a lottery system. Hunting for other game animals is permitted on the wildlife area. There are many picnic areas on the shore of the lake with tables available on a first come, first served basis.
