= Carl Potter Mound =

Archaeological site in Ohio, United States

- U.S. National Register of Historic Places
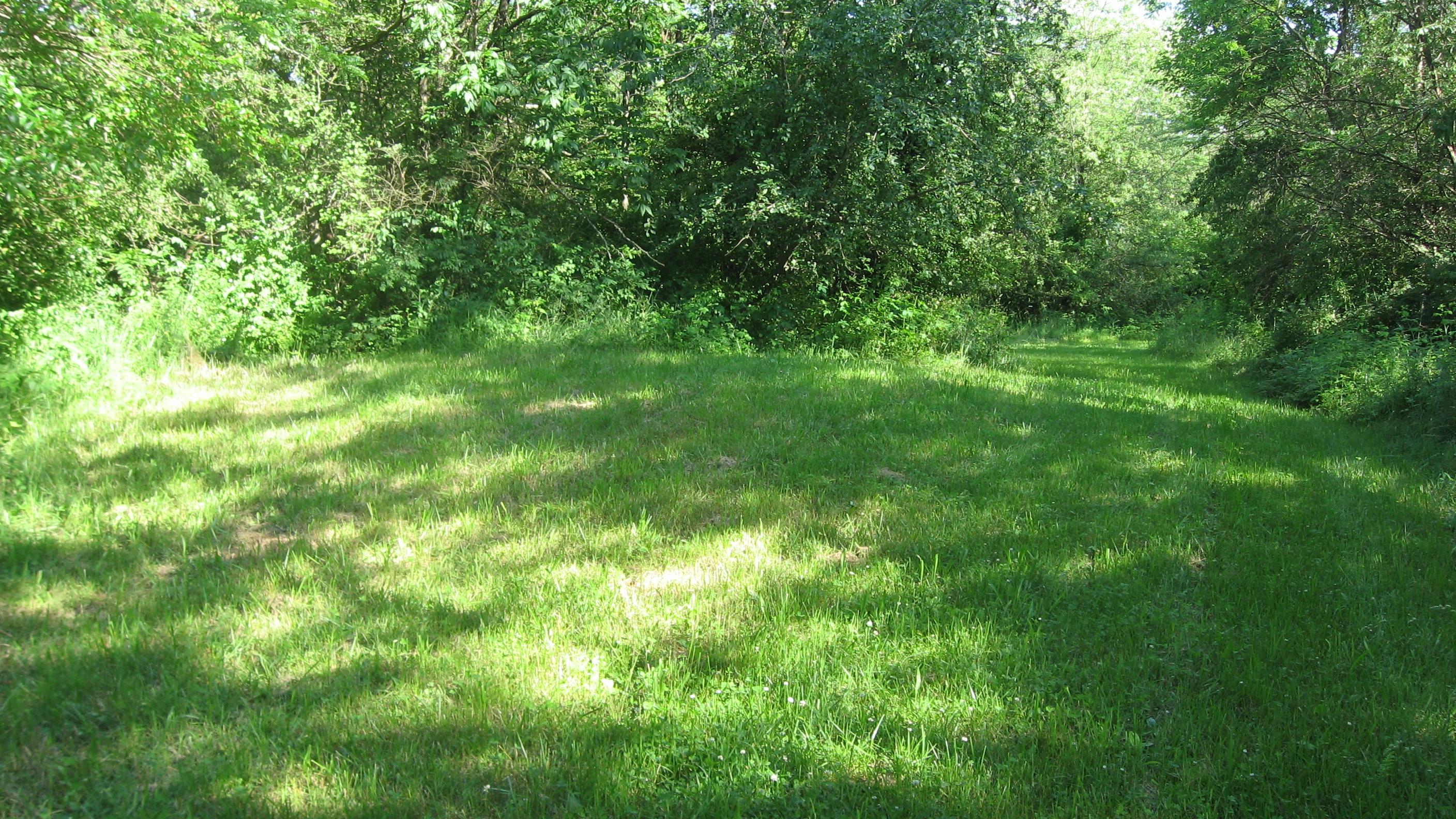
- Overview of the mound

- Location within Ohio Location within the United States
- Location: East of State Route 56 in Union Township
- Nearest city: Mechanicsburg, Ohio
- Coordinates: 40°2′20.8″N 83°36′4.5″W
- Area: 1 acre (0.40 ha)
- NRHP reference No.: 74001407
- Added to NRHP: August 13, 1974

The Carl Potter Mound (also known as "Hodge Mound II"; designated 33CH11-II) is a historic Native American mound in southern Champaign County, Ohio, United States. Located near Mechanicsburg, it lies on a small ridge in a pasture field in southeastern Union Township. In 1974, the mound was listed on the National Register of Historic Places as a potential archaeological site, primarily because of its use as a burial mound.

== Archaeology of Champaign County ==
The valleys of the Scioto and Miami rivers were rich with prehistoric earthworks when whites settled Ohio. Champaign County lies midway between these rivers, and accordingly its earthworks are fewer than those of the counties located along those two rivers. A 1914 study observed only six mounds and a total of eighteen archaeological sites countywide, in contrast to thirty-three mounds and a total of fifty-nine sites in Logan County to the north, and twenty-two mounds and a total of ninety-six sites in Miami County to the west. Unknown to this survey was the Carl Potter Mound: although it is one of several mounds and many burial sites that have been recorded on a single farm in Union Township, the only sites observed by the survey were located in the western part of the township.

== Nearby investigations ==
In the late nineteenth century, a kame in the farm's barnyard was excavated for gravel and found to contain multiple burials and artifacts, which have since been assessed as dating from the Cole period. Also located on the Potter farm is the site of a smaller mound, known as "Hodge Mound I." Intensive cultivation over the mound has reduced it to ground level; its location can only be observed when the site is plowed, at which time remnants of charcoal can be seen in the newly cultivated soil. In contrast, the Potter Mound is not plowed; although it has been reduced in height by cultivation in the past, the site is no longer being so used.

During the 1930s, a group of young boys decided to dig into the Potter Mound; their primitive investigation yielded a group of bones and a grooved stone axe. No other excavations, whether crude or rigorous, have been conducted since that time: accordingly, it is believed that the mound still contains burials and other artifacts. This axe alone is insufficient to identify the builders of the mound: grooved axes have been discovered both at early Adena sites and at the sites of the earlier Late Archaic period. Nevertheless, it is believed that the mound was built by the Adena, due to its location: like the Potter mound, many confirmed Adena sites are located on small ridges near brooks. If the mound were built by an Adena group, it is likely the work of a clan that was isolated from the main Adena regions in the Scioto River valley to the east.

== Preservation ==
In 1970, Ohio State University archaeologist Stephen C. Koleszar carried out a survey of archaeological sites in southwestern Ohio. Although six mounds had been recorded in Champaign County in 1914 — not including the Potter mound — only three mounds, including the Potter mound, were still in existence by 1970. Four years later, the Potter mound was added to the National Register of Historic Places as part of a preservation effort. As part of its nomination to the Register, it was designated the "Carl Potter Mound" for its owner, Carl Potter; its previous name of "Hodge Mound" is a reference to a former owner, James A. Hodge.

== See also ==
- List of burial mounds in the United States
