= Spruce Run Earthworks =

Archaeological site in Ohio, United States

- U.S. National Register of Historic Places
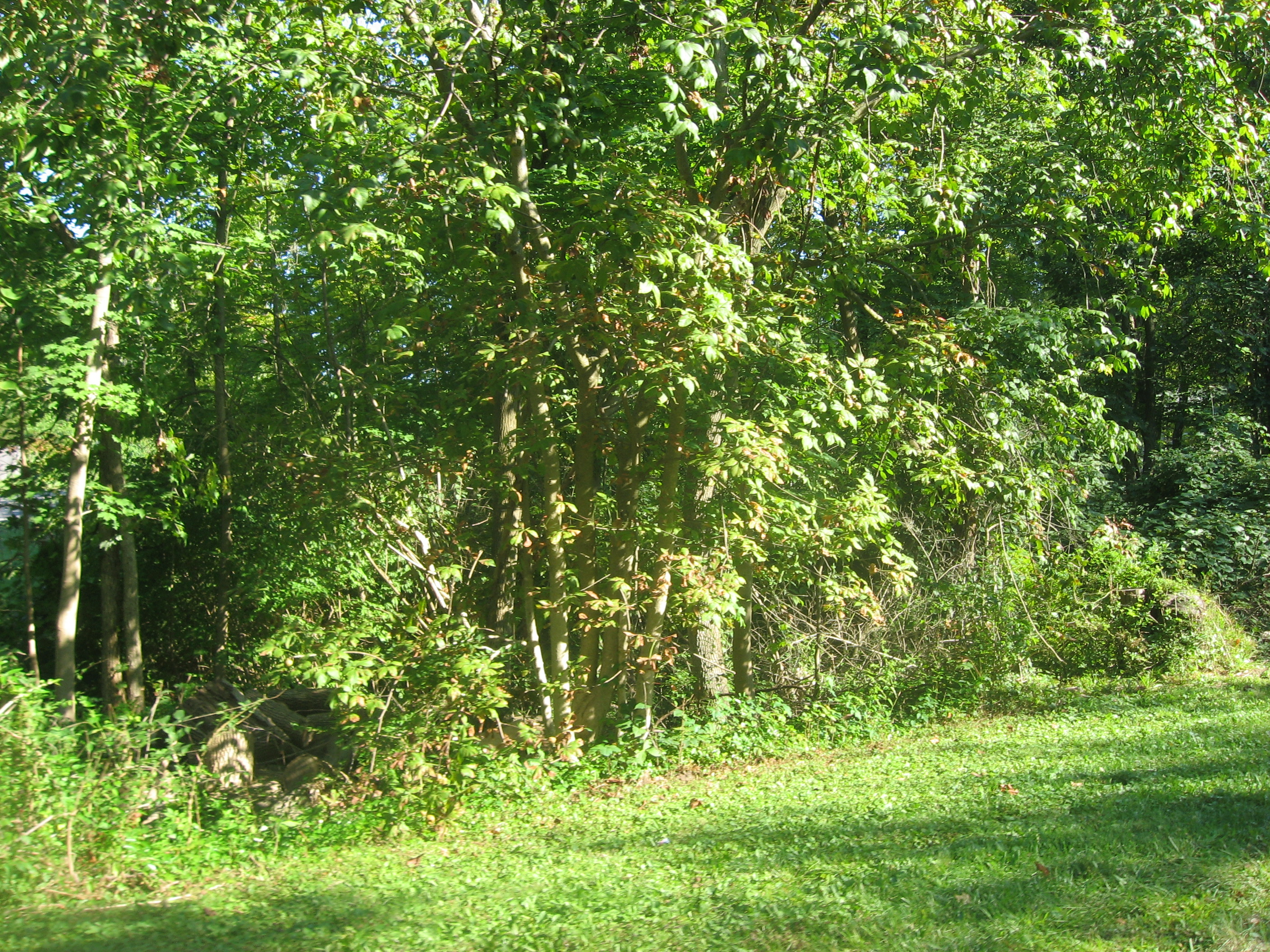
- Woods within which the works are located

- Location within Ohio Location within the United States
- Nearest city: Galena, Ohio
- Coordinates: 40°10′40″N 82°51′51.6″W
- Area: 1 acre (0.40 ha)
- NRHP reference No.: 73001431
- Added to NRHP: July 16, 1973

The Spruce Run Earthworks is an archaeological site located in the central part of the U.S. state of Ohio, in Delaware County. It is believed to have been built by the Adena culture.

== See also ==
- Highbanks Metropolitan Park Mounds I and II
- Highbank Park Works
