= Cole culture =

Culture of Native American people from Ohio

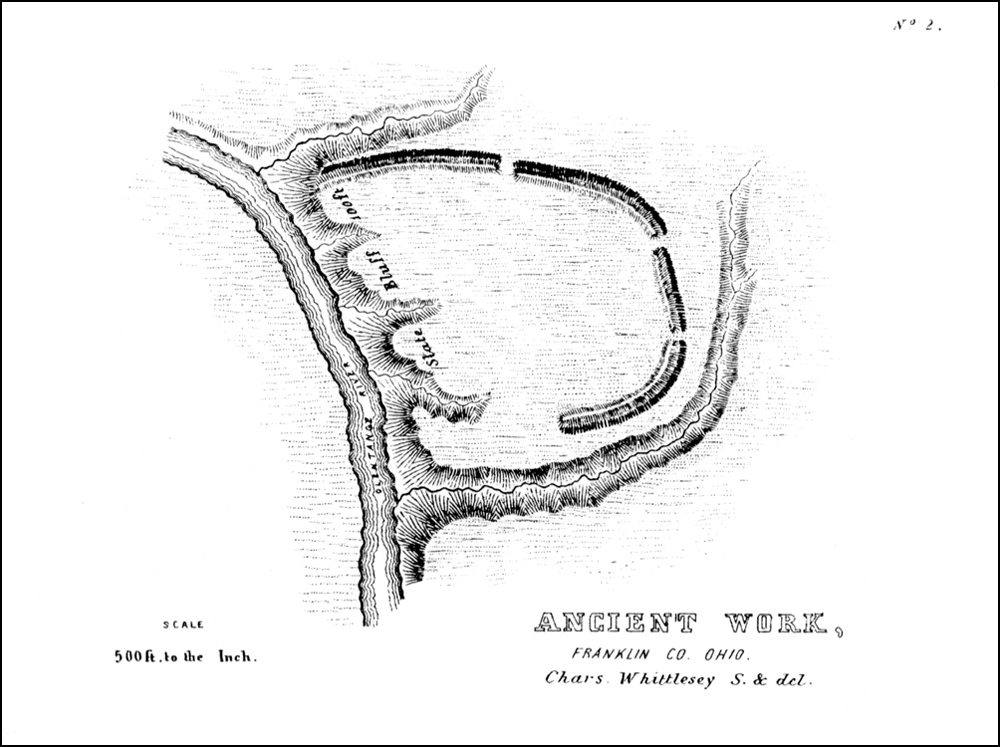
Map of the Highbanks Park Earthworks built by Cole culture people

The Cole Culture (800–1300 CE) is a Late Woodland Period culture of Native American people from central Ohio.

Cole Culture people made flint tools and pottery. They were agrarian and cultivated beans, maize, squash, and tobacco. Cole people buried their dead in subterranean graves instead of mounds. They shared many traits with the Hopewell tradition and might be descended from them. A major Cole Culture site is the Ufferman Site in Delaware County, Ohio. Another is the Highbank Park Works, also in Delaware County, built between 800 and 1300 CE.

== See also ==
- Carl Potter Mound
- Fort Ancient culture
- Monongahela culture
