= Spruce Run Evangelical Lutheran Zion Church =

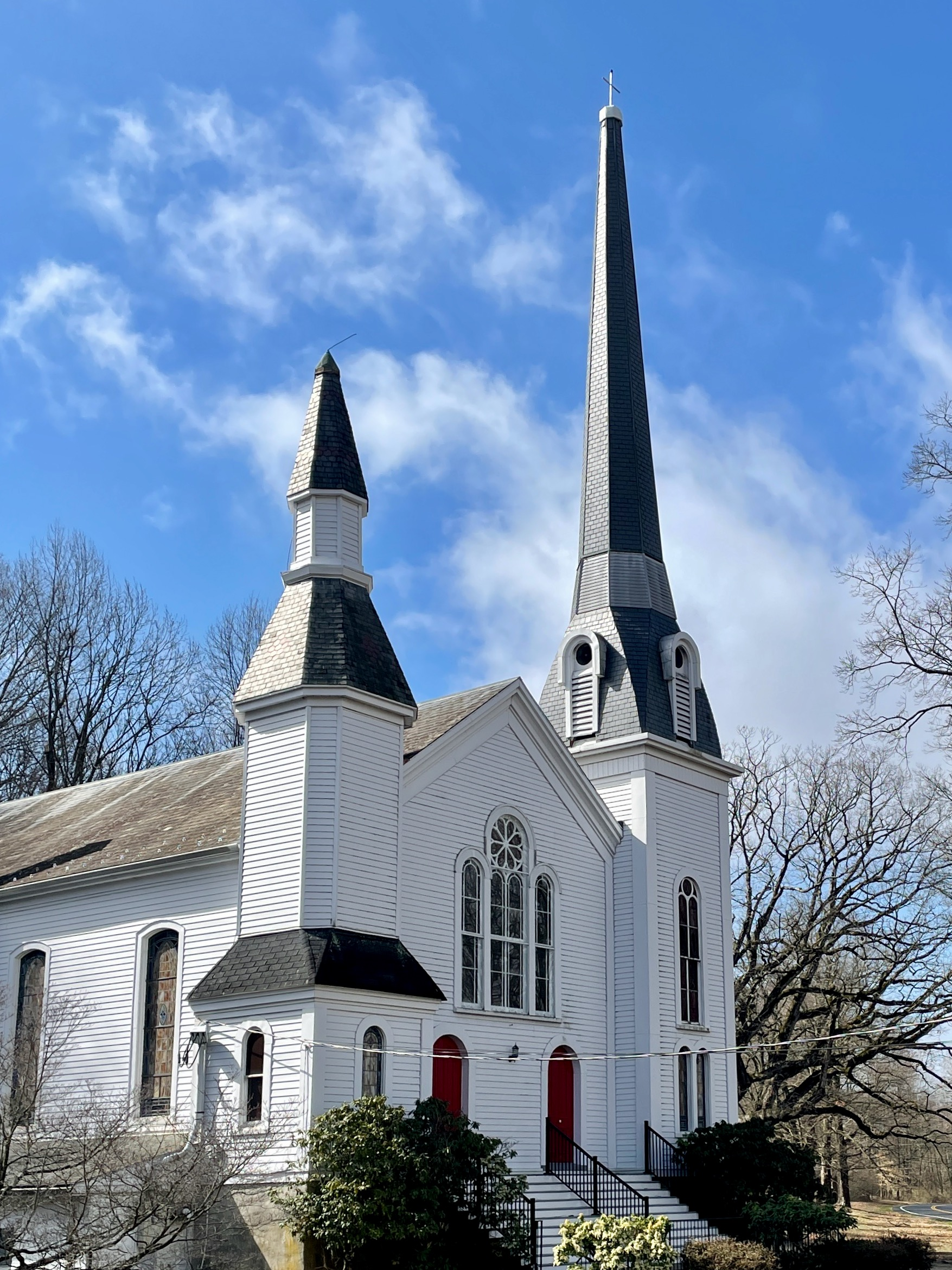

- Location within Hunterdon County, New Jersey Location within New Jersey Location within the United States
- 40°42′29″N 74°55′22″W
- Location: 442 West Hill Road; Glen Gardner, New Jersey

History
- Founded: 1774
- Dedicated: March 9, 1871

Spruce Run Evangelical Lutheran Zion Church, also known as Spruce Run Lutheran Church, is located at 442 West Hill Road in the Spruce Run section of Lebanon Township in Hunterdon County, New Jersey. The congregation is a member of the New Jersey Synod and the Evangelical Lutheran Church in America (ELCA).

The congregation was organized in 1774 by thirteen members who worshiped in the barn of Frederick Fritts in the summer, and in his home during the winter. Initially, services were conducted every four weeks, and were exclusively in German.

In 1861, Spruce Run Lutheran Church was the site of the first convention of the New Jersey Synod of churches. The new Synod met there again in 1868.

== Church building ==
The first church building was built in 1800. Of frame construction from yellow poplar, the church was known as the “red church.” This was a Union church, combining Reformed and Lutheran congregations.

In 1835 a new stone church was built to the left of the old frame church.

The cornerstone for the present church building was laid on July 30, 1870, and the church was dedicated on March 9, 1871.

== Cemetery ==
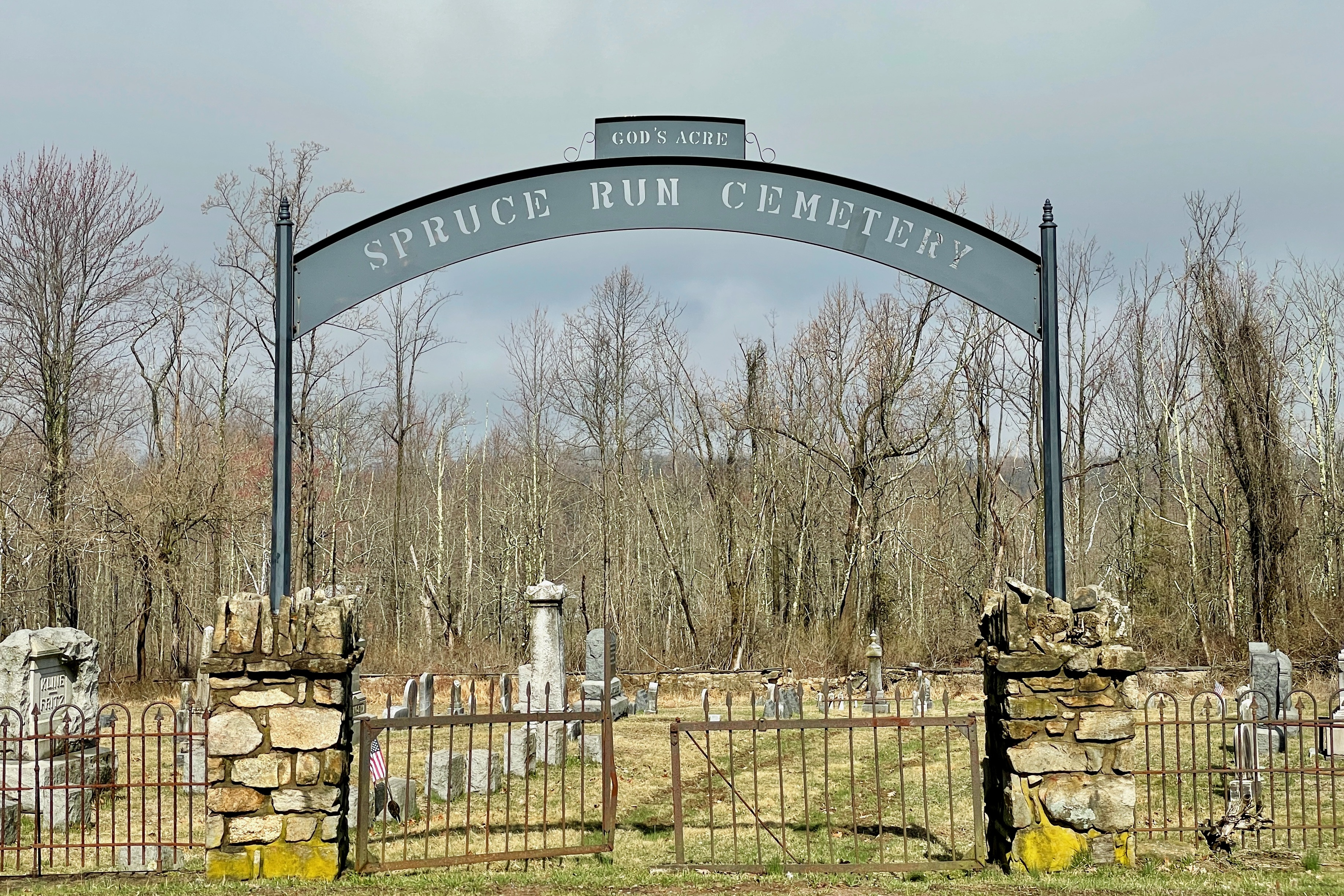
Spruce Run Cemetery

The original cemetery is located across the road, featuring “God’s Acre” at the top of the entrance gate. It is the oldest church cemetery in the township.

== Clergy ==
The church’s first pastor was Reverend William Graf, who began serving the congregation in 1774. His formal call as pastor began in July 1775; he served until 1800, as part of a circuit of six other area Lutheran churches.

On September 2, 1834, the church called its own pastor, Rev. Robert Collyer. From that time on the church maintained complete independence from the other circuit churches.

=== List of clergy ===
The church has had 22 pastors, comprising 23 pastoral tenures (Rev. Steven Traver served twice, from 1900-1905 and 1927-1947).

Pastor Name	Tenure Start	Tenure End
William Graf	1775	1808
Ernest Lewis Hazelius	1808	1815
David Hendricks	1816	1822
Henry Pohlman	1822	1833
Richard Collier	1833	1860
Philip A. Strobel	1860	1864
David Kline	1864	1877
Chester H. Traver	1877	1885
Valentine F. Bolton	1885	1895
Charles Bickle	1895	1900
Stephen Traver	1900	1905
John I. Hummer	1906	1909
Stanley Haverly	1909	1921
Eugene F. Sherman	1921	1927
Stephen Traver	1927	1947
George R. Koehler	1950	1959
Folkers V. Freimanis	1960	1965
Richard R. Shenton	1966	1973
Elmer Eiche	1973	1980
Galen Tinder	1981	1990
Gary L. Salmon	1990	1997
Gary V. Ettlemyer	1998	2019
Christopher L. Halverson	2020	Present
