= Delaware County Courthouse (Ohio) =

Local government building in the United States

- U.S. National Register of Historic Places
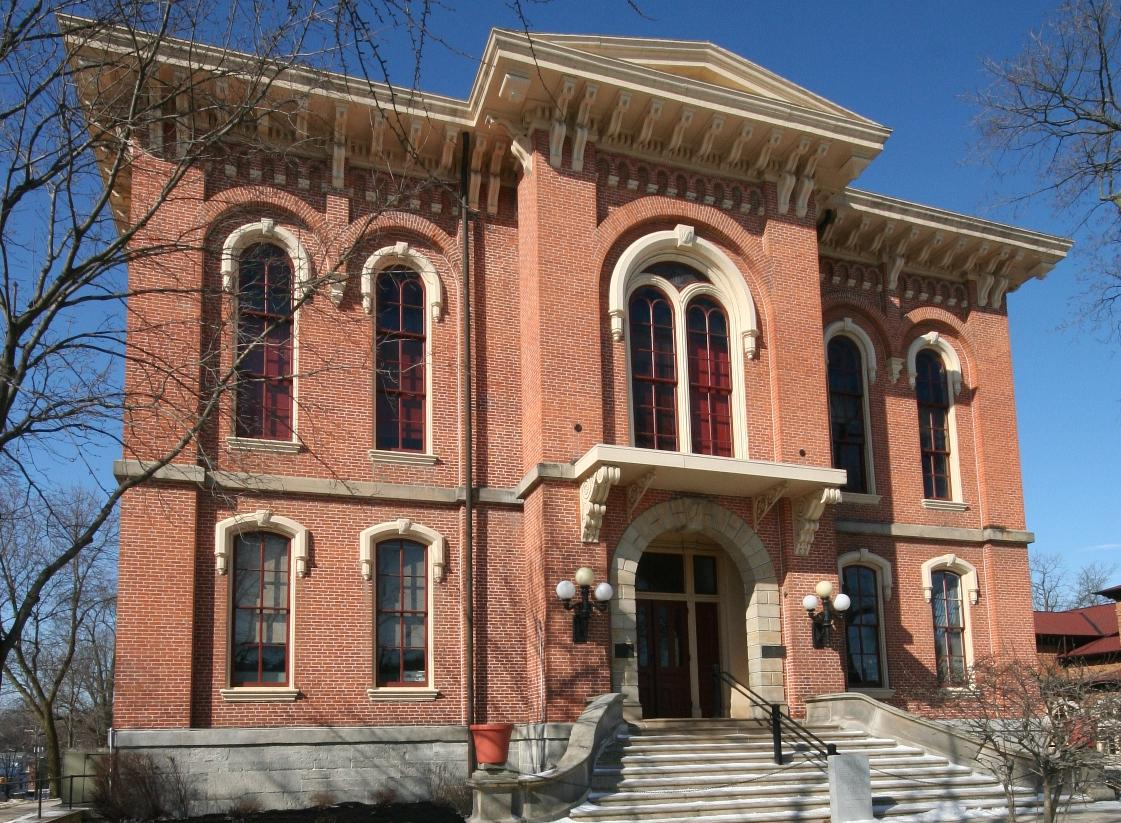
- The Delaware County Courthouse in Delaware, Ohio.

- Location within Ohio Location within the United States
- Location: N. Sandusky St. and Central Ave., Delaware, Ohio
- Coordinates: 40°18′6″N 83°4′6″W
- Area: 1 acre (0.40 ha)
- Built: 1868
- Architect: Jones, R.N.
- Architectural style: Italianate
- NRHP reference No.: 73001429
- Added to NRHP: May 22, 1973

The Historic Delaware County Courthouse is located at 91 N Sandusky St, Delaware, OH 43015 in Delaware, Ohio. The courthouse was placed on the National Register.

== History ==
Delaware County was established in 1807 by an act of the Ohio General Assembly. The county seat was placed at Berkshire until 1808 when Delaware was founded and successfully petitioned to be the county seat. The courts met in various locations until a courthouse was built in 1815. The building cost the county $8,000 and was a simple one story building. The building contained fire walls to protect the structure from burning, but a fire struck the building towards the end of the 1800s forcing the county to rent a different location.

A new courthouse was chosen and planned in 1868 in the Italianate style and designed by Robert N. Jones. The courthouse cost the county $80,000 to build. In 1996, the county renovated the courthouse for six months at a cost of $500,000.

The county is faced with a growing population and a new Justice Center is currently under construction. That building is scheduled for completion and occupancy in August or September 2017. The General and Domestic Relations Divisions of the Delaware County Court of Common Pleas will move to the new building as will the Public Defender's Office, the Delaware County Clerk of Courts, the adult probation office, and a meeting room for the grand jury. The county has announced plans to renovate the historic courthouse, and a facilities use study is underway to determine which county offices will occupy the building once renovated.

== Exterior ==
The square two-story structure is built of red bricks. The main facade contains a central projection capped with a pediment. The door sits in a recessed alcove and is contained within an arch faced with stone blocks. A window above contains two thin arched windows within an arched recess. To either side of the projection are two arched windows, the lower windows being shorter with squat arches and the top floor containing longer fully arched windows. Each window is surrounded by decorative stone casings. The hipped roof rises to a central square drum supporting a dome topped by a statue of Justice. A wrought iron railing runs around the drum and arched windows light the floors below.
