= Spruce Run, New Jersey =

Populated place in Hunterdon County, New Jersey, US

- Unincorporated community
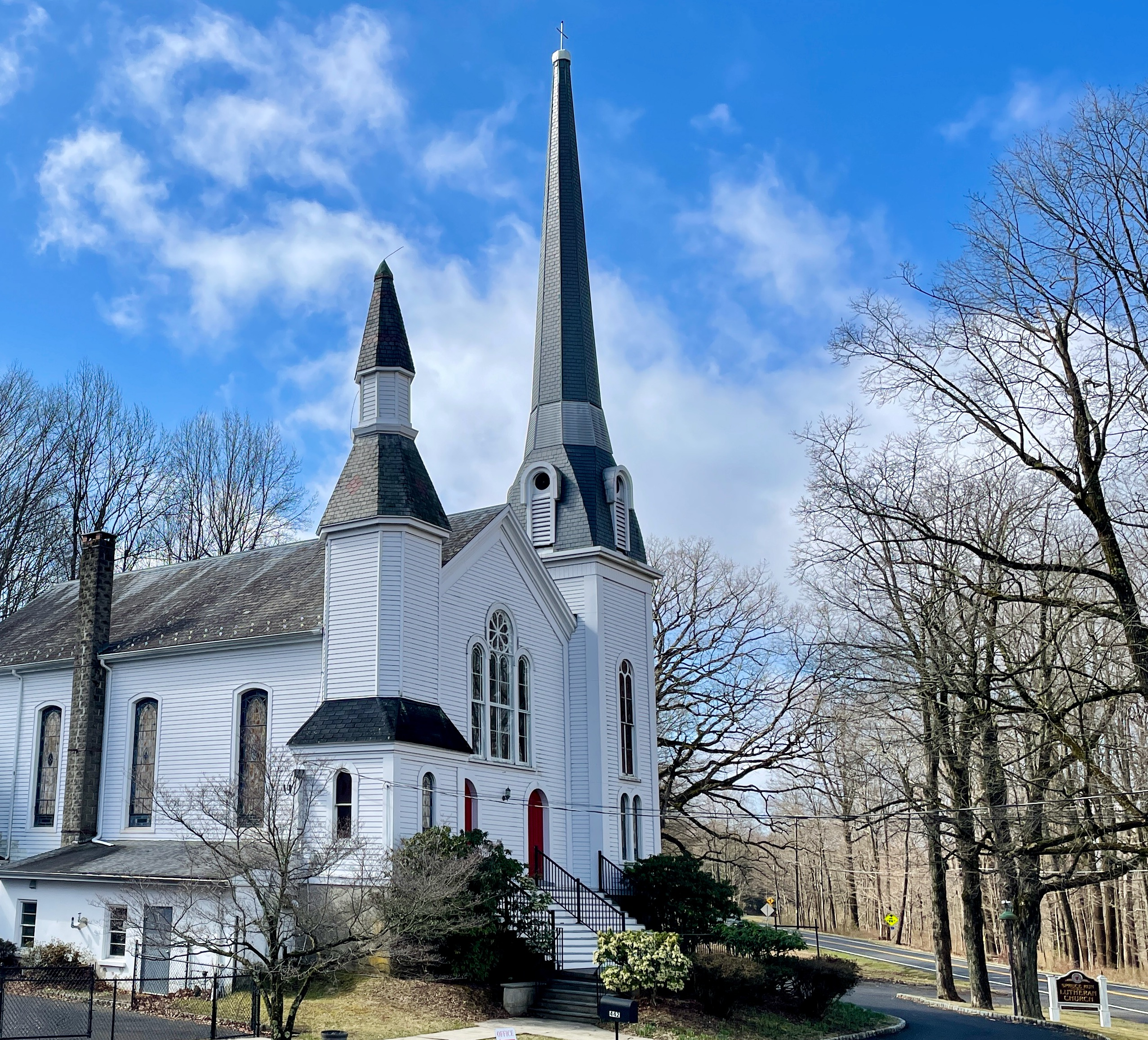
- Spruce Run Evangelical Lutheran Zion Church

- Location within Hunterdon County, New Jersey Location within New Jersey Location within the United States
- Coordinates: 40°42′31″N 74°55′20″W
- Country: United States
- State: New Jersey
- County: Hunterdon
- Township: Lebanon
- Elevation: 715 ft (218 m)
- GNIS feature ID: 883456

Spruce Run is an unincorporated community located along County Route 628 (Hill Road) and Spruce Run Road within Lebanon Township in Hunterdon County, New Jersey. It is about 1 mile (1.6 km) northwest of Glen Gardner.

== History ==
A school house was built here in 1766. Subsequent ones were built in 1825 and 1874. In 1800, the Lutheran and Reformed congregations built a union church. The current Spruce Run Evangelical Lutheran Zion Church was built in 1870.
