= Olentangy River =

River in Ohio, United States of America

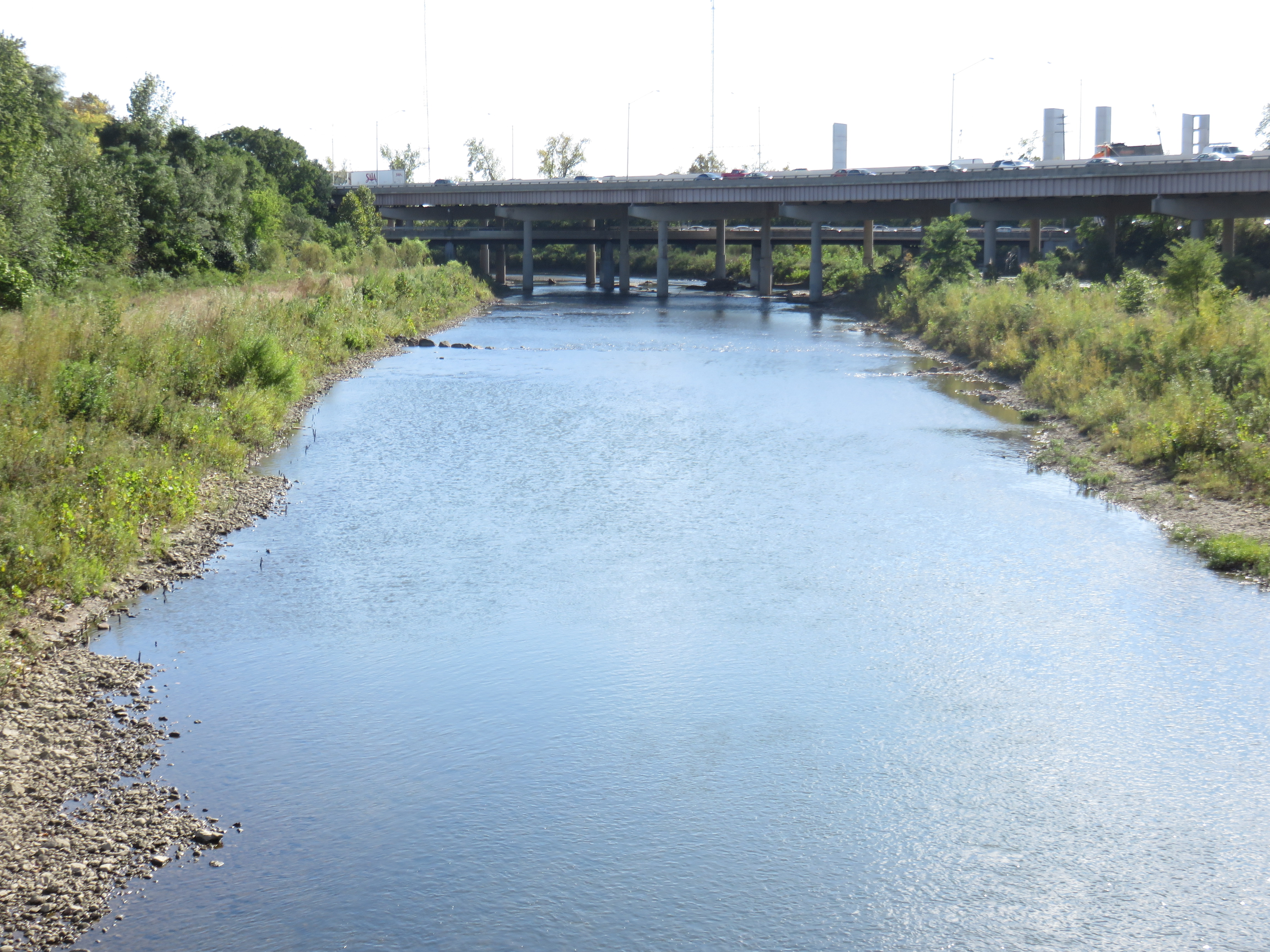
- State Route 315 passing over the Olentangy in Columbus in 2018

Physical characteristics
- Source
  - location: Approximately 2 mi (3.2 km) southeast of Galion, Ohio
  - elevation: 1,190 ft (360 m)
- Mouth
  - location: Scioto River at Columbus
  - coordinates: 39°57′53″N 83°1′0″W
  - elevation: 710 ft (220 m)
- Basin size: 543 mi^{2} (1,410 km^{2})
- Discharge
  - location: J. H. Herrick Drive, Columbus
  - average: 789.1 cu ft/s (22.34 m^{3}/s), USGS water years 2015-2019

Map of Olentangy River highlighted within the Scioto River watershed

The Olentangy River /oʊlənˈtændʒi/ is a 97-mile-long (156 km) tributary of the Scioto River in Ohio, United States.

== History ==
It was originally called keenhongsheconsepung, a Delaware word literally translated as "sharp tool river", based on the shale found along its shores. Early settlers to the region translated this into "Whetstone River". In 1833, the Ohio General Assembly passed legislation intending to restore the original Native American names to some Ohio waterways, but mistakenly gave Whetstone River the name "Olentangy"—Delaware for "river of the red face paint"—which had actually belonged to what is now known as Big Darby Creek.

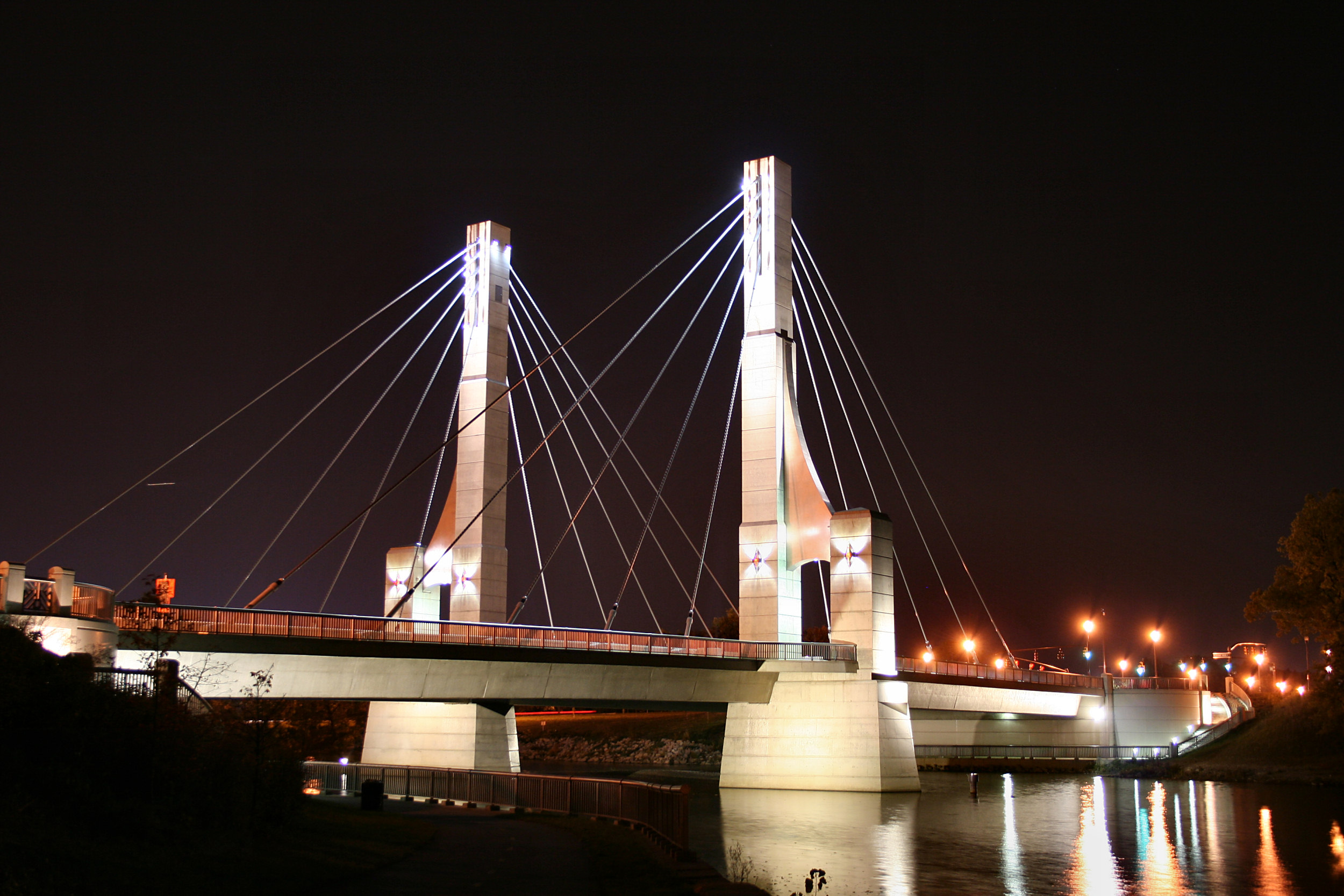
Lane Avenue Bridge in Columbus, Ohio, near the Ohio State University campus

== Geography ==
The Olentangy River rises in Morrow County approximately 2 mi (3.2 km) southeast of Galion, near Blooming Grove, flowing through Galion and northwest towards Bucyrus, where it then turns south and flows through Eastern Marion County, Ohio (where it is still locally known as the Whetstone River) before flowing south into Delaware County. The Delaware Dam creates the Delaware Lake there. The Ohio Department of Natural Resources maintains a wildlife area and the Delaware State Park on the shores of the lake.

The river continues southward towards the communities of Delaware, Powell, Worthington, and the village of Riverlea, before reaching Columbus, beginning with Clintonville and flowing through Old North Columbus, the campus of The Ohio State University, and the historic complex of neighborhoods to the south before merging with the Scioto River in the Arena District at location known as Confluence Park. The River’s western waterfront forms the right-of-way for the majority of SR 315. The original alignment of that route is known as Olentangy River Road, and some points north of the Columbus Outerbelt, where a freeway alignment was never built, still go by that name.

The Delaware State Park Reservoir, also known as Delaware Lake, was constructed along the Olentangy River in 1951. The reservoir is located 5 miles north of the city of Delaware, and was built by the U.S. Army Corps of Engineers for flood control purposes. On 13 January 2005, Delaware Dam was nearly overtopped. The water level came within less than 1 foot of the top of the dam, requiring the main spill gates to be opened before it began dropping.

The Olentangy River is the primary source of drinking water for much of Delaware County. Both the City of Delaware and Del-Co Water Company, the supplier of drinking water to most of rural Delaware County (and other communities beyond), draw the majority of their water supplies from the Olentangy system.

Twenty-two miles of the Olentangy have been designated a State Scenic River by the Ohio Department of Natural Resources, Division of Natural Areas & Preserves.

== Variant names ==
The Olentangy River has also been known as Keenhongsheconsepung, Oleutangy, Whetstone Creek, Whetstone River, and Whitestone Creek.

A tributary is called Whetstone Creek.

== River restoration ==
In 2012 the Ohio EPA and the City of Columbus began to remove some of the lowhead dams that cross the river. Work started with removing the 5th Avenue Dam. The river is now about half of its former width. Work continues to restore the banks and clean the area.

== Popular culture ==
Broadcaster Keith Jackson would introduce Ohio State football games "from the banks of the mighty Olentangy."

== See also ==
- List of rivers of Ohio
- Olentangy Trail
