= Ohio Capital Conference =

High school athletic conference in Ohio, US

- Conference: Ohio High School Athletic Association
- Founded: 1968
- Commissioner: Steve Petros
- Sports fielded: 23
- Division: OHSAA Division I & II
- No. of teams: 33
- Headquarters: Columbus, Ohio
- Region: Central Ohio

Locations
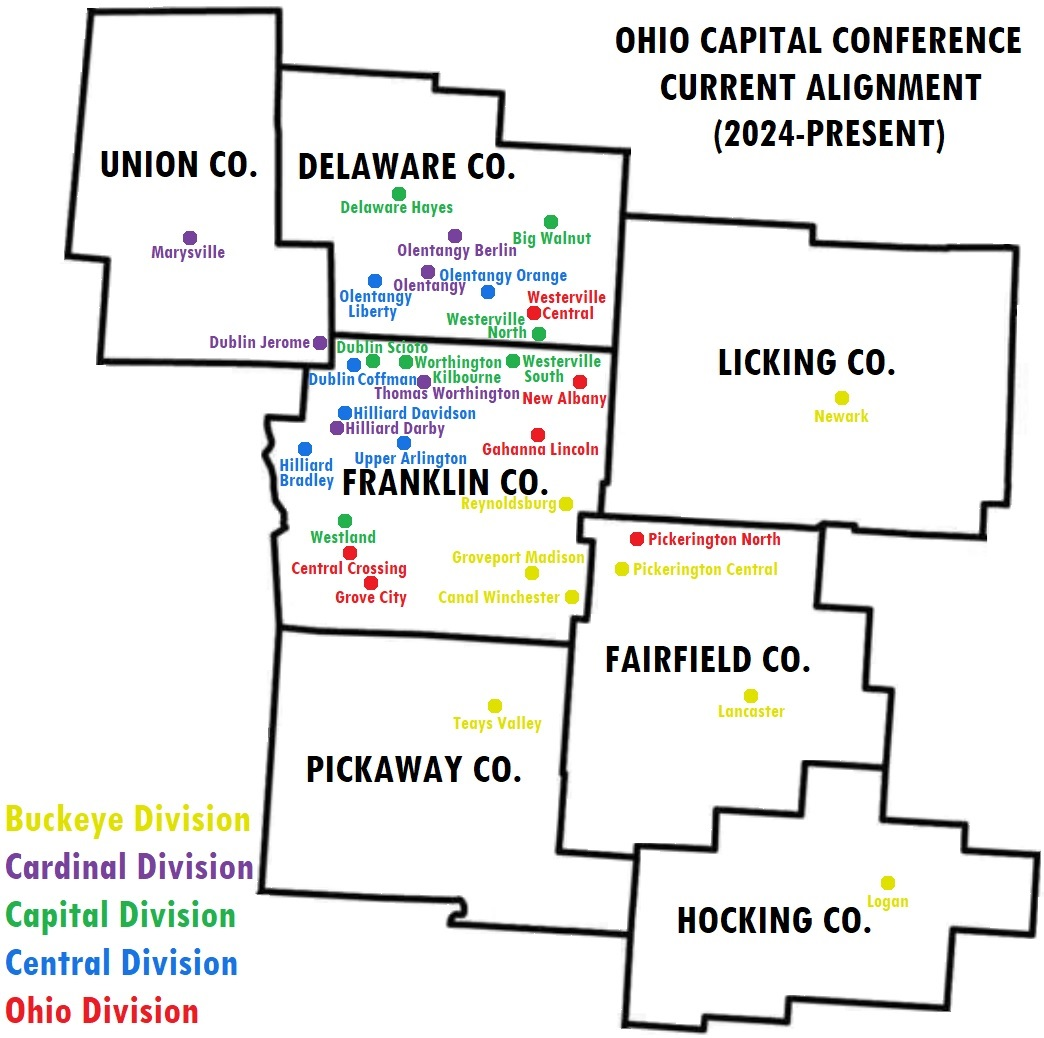
- Ohio Capital Conference: Divisional Map

The Ohio Capital Conference is a high school athletic conference located in Central Ohio. It comprises 33 public high schools located primarily in suburban Columbus, Ohio, encompassing Delaware, Fairfield, Franklin, Hocking, Licking, Pickaway and Union counties. The league is geographically divided into three divisions of six teams each (Cardinal, Central, and Ohio) one division of seven teams (Capital) and one division of eight teams (Buckeye). Twenty-four schools compete in the OHSAA's Division I classification for football while nine schools compete in Division II. All conference members compete in the Central District postseason tournaments prior to the regional and state tournaments.

The newest schools to join the OCC are Teays Valley and Logan (2024–25). The most recent school to leave is Franklin Heights (moved to the Central Buckeye League in 2024-25). The conference re-aligned with the 2024-25 school year.

== Members ==
School	Location	Joined	Enrollment	Nickname	Colors
Buckeye Division
Canal Winchester	Canal Winchester, Ohio	2013	1,160	Indians	
Groveport Madison	Groveport, Ohio	1974	2,043	Cruisers	
Lancaster	Lancaster, Ohio	1997	1,824	Golden Gales	
Logan	Logan, Ohio	2024	1,151	Chieftains	
Newark	Newark, Ohio	1995	1,493	Wildcats	
Pickerington Central	Pickerington, Ohio	1981	1,773	Tigers	
Reynoldsburg	Reynoldsburg, Ohio	1968	2,191	Raiders	
Teays Valley	Ashville, Ohio	2024	1,165	Vikings	
Capital Division
Big Walnut	Sunbury, Ohio	1997	1,042	Golden Eagles	
Delaware Hayes	Delaware, Ohio	1968	1,631	Pacers	
Dublin Scioto	Dublin, Ohio	1995	1,335	Irish	
Westerville North	Westerville, Ohio	1977	1,548	Warriors	
Westerville South	Westerville, Ohio	1968	1,527	Wildcats	
Westland	Galloway, Ohio	1970	1,835	Cougars	
Worthington Kilbourne	Columbus, Ohio	1991	1,284	Wolves	
Cardinal Division
Dublin Jerome	Dublin, Ohio	2004	1,794	Celtics	
Hilliard Darby	Hilliard, Ohio	1997	1,611	Panthers	
Olentangy	Lewis Center, Ohio	1997	1,449	Braves	
Olentangy Berlin	Delaware, Ohio	2018	1,456	Bears	
Marysville	Marysville, Ohio	1991	1,685	Monarchs	
Thomas Worthington	Worthington, Ohio	1968	1,747	Cardinals	
Central Division
Dublin Coffman	Dublin, Ohio	1991	1,940	Shamrocks	
Hilliard Bradley	Hilliard, Ohio	2009	1,686	Jaguars	
Hilliard Davidson	Hilliard, Ohio	1974	1,870	Wildcats	
Olentangy Orange	Lewis Center, Ohio	2008	2,032	Pioneers	
Olentangy Liberty	Powell, Ohio	2004	2,157	Patriots	
Upper Arlington	Upper Arlington, Ohio	1981	1,875	Golden Bears	
Ohio Division
Central Crossing	Grove City, Ohio	2002	1,709	Comets	
Gahanna Lincoln	Gahanna, Ohio	1968	2,254	Lions	
Grove City	Grove City, Ohio	1981	1,897	Greyhounds	
New Albany	New Albany, Ohio	2006	1,613	Eagles	
Pickerington North	Pickerington, Ohio	2004	1,648	Panthers	
Westerville Central	Westerville, Ohio	2004	1,848	Warhawks	

=== Former members ===
School	Location	Joined	Left	Enrollment	Nickname	Colors	Current Conference
Pleasant View	Grove City, Ohio	1968	1970	873	Panthers		None; Converted to a middle school; Replaced by Westland
Whitehall-Yearling	Whitehall, Ohio	1968	2001	867	Rams		Central Buckeye League
Chillicothe	Chillicothe, Ohio	1976	2006	845	Cavaliers		Frontier Athletic Conference
Watkins Memorial	Pataskala, Ohio	1991	2013	1,270	Warriors		Licking County League
Mount Vernon	Mount Vernon, Ohio	1968	2016	1,074	Yellow Jackets		Licking County League
Franklin Heights	Columbus, Ohio	1981	2024	1,338	Falcons		Central Buckeye League

=== Membership timeline ===
Full members Full members (non-football) Sport Affiliate Assoc. members (football only) Other Conference Other Conference

== Sports ==
The Ohio Capital Conference sponsors the following 23 varsity sports.

=== Boys sports ===
- Baseball
- Basketball
- Cross country
- Football
- Golf
- Lacrosse
- Soccer
- Swimming & diving
- Tennis
- Outdoor track
- Volleyball
- Wrestling

=== Girls sports ===
- Basketball
- Cross country
- Golf
- Gymnastics
- Lacrosse
- Soccer
- Softball
- Swimming & diving
- Tennis
- Outdoor track
- Volleyball
- Cheerleading

== History ==
On December 6, 1966, five (5) schools met at Millers Village Inn in Gahanna to discuss the formation of a new athletic conference and develop a proposed conference constitution. The following Principals and Athletic Directors were in attendance:

- Gahanna Lincoln: Ben Webb and Byron Prushing
- Reynoldsburg: Joe Endry and Bill Starner
- Westerville: Dana Aukerman and Walt Bahorek
- Whitehall: Bob Strohm and Ray Schick
- Worthington: Lou Koloze and Dick West

The purpose was to approve the proposed constitution for the new league. Joe Endry, Acting Chairman of the group, asked for suggestions for a name for the new league. Several suggestions were made and the name Ohio Capital Conference was unanimously chosen.

Chairman Endry called for a discussion of the proposed constitution of the Ohio Capital Conference. After a review and discussion. the Schools’ representatives stated that they were in agreement and were ready to sign the document. Copies of the constitution were signed and the new constitution became a reality.

Original Members: Gahanna Lincoln, Reynoldsburg, Westerville, Whitehall-Yearling & Worthington Invited to join: Delaware Hayes, Mount Vernon, Pleasant View (now Westland)

1968-69 school year League Competition began with Gahanna Lincoln, Reynoldsburg, Whitehall-Yearling, Westerville, Worthington, Delaware Hayes, Mount Vernon and Pleasant View (Westland) competing.

1974-75: Groveport Madison & Hilliard join; Westerville becomes "Westerville South";

1977-78: Chillicothe & Westerville North join. League begins play in two divisions.

1981-82: Franklin Heights, Grove City, Upper Arlington, and Pickerington join. League votes to determine divisions by enrollment and "no sister schools in same division" rules.

1991-92: Dublin, Marysville, Watkins Memorial, Worthington Kilbourne join. "Worthington" becomes Thomas Worthington. League divides into 3 divisions.

1995-96: Newark and Dublin Scioto join the league. "Dublin" becomes Dublin Coffman.

1997-98: Big Walnut, Lancaster, Olentangy, Hilliard Darby join league. "Hilliard" becomes Hilliard Davidson. League divides into 4 divisions.

2002-03: Whitehall-Yearling leaves league. Central Crossing joins in their place.

2004-05: League divides into 5 divisions and abolishes the enrollment rule in determining divisions. Dublin Jerome, Olentangy Liberty, Pickerington North, and Westerville Central join league. "Pickerington" becomes Pickerington Central.

From "History of the Ohio Capital Conference": Mr. Workman, Chairman of the Alignment Committee, reviewed the proposed divisional alignment for the 2004-05 2005-06 seasons. Mr. Workman stated that the Committee was aware that the proposed alignment is in violation of the enrollment concept but felt that there was no other choice because of the more important “sister school” concept.

2006-07: Chillicothe leaves league. New Albany joins league.

2008-09: Hilliard Bradley and Olentangy Orange join league. League switches from 5 divisions to 4 divisions. League abandons rule against sister schools in same division. (hence, schools from same district could be placed in same division.)

2013-14: Watkins Memorial leaves league. Canal Winchester joins league.

2016-17: Mount Vernon leaves league. League switches back to 5 divisions.

2018-19: Olentangy Berlin joins league.

2024-25: Logan and Teays Valley join the league. Franklin Heights participates in football only for one final season and leaves the league for all other sports.

== Football ==
=== Conference championships by year ===
Year	Champions				
Year	Ohio	Capital	Central	Cardinal	Buckeye
1968	Worthington	Started in 1977	Started in 1991	Started in 1997	Started in 2004
1969	Delaware Hayes; Whitehall-Yearling	Started in 1977	Started in 1991	Started in 1997	Started in 2004
1970	Westland	Started in 1977	Started in 1991	Started in 1997	Started in 2004
1971	Worthington	Started in 1977	Started in 1991	Started in 1997	Started in 2004
1972		Started in 1977	Started in 1991	Started in 1997	Started in 2004
1973		Started in 1977	Started in 1991	Started in 1997	Started in 2004
1974	Worthington	Started in 1977	Started in 1991	Started in 1997	Started in 2004
1975	Westerville	Started in 1977	Started in 1991	Started in 1997	Started in 2004
1976		Started in 1977	Started in 1991	Started in 1997	Started in 2004
1977	Hilliard	Started in 1991	Started in 1997	Started in 2004	
1978	Groveport Madison	Hilliard	Started in 1991	Started in 1997	Started in 2004
1979	Westerville North	Started in 1991	Started in 1997	Started in 2004	
1980	Westerville North	Started in 1991	Started in 1997	Started in 2004	
1981	Upper Arlington	Whitehall-Yearling	Started in 1991	Started in 1997	Started in 2004
1982	Upper Arlington	Franklin Heights	Started in 1991	Started in 1997	Started in 2004
1983	Gahanna Lincoln; Upper Arlington	Started in 1991	Started in 1997	Started in 2004	
1984	Worthington	Whitehall-Yearling	Started in 1991	Started in 1997	Started in 2004
1985	Worthington	Whitehall-Yearling	Started in 1991	Started in 1997	Started in 2004
1986	Worthington	Westerville North	Started in 1991	Started in 1997	Started in 2004
1987	Gahanna Lincoln	Chillicothe	Started in 1991	Started in 1997	Started in 2004
1988	Westerville North	Chillicothe	Started in 1991	Started in 1997	Started in 2004
1989	Grove City	Franklin Heights	Started in 1991	Started in 1997	Started in 2004
1990	Grove City	Chillicothe	Started in 1991	Started in 1997	Started in 2004
1991	Dublin	Marysville	Grove City	Started in 1997	Started in 2004
1992	Gahanna Lincoln; Westland; Thomas Worthington	Pickerington	Grove City	Started in 1997	Started in 2004
1993	Westland	Mount Vernon; Whitehall-Yearling; Reynoldsburg	Upper Arlington; Hilliard	Started in 1997	Started in 2004
1994	Dublin	Marysville; Watkins Memorial	Hilliard	Started in 1997	Started in 2004
1995	Westerville North	Franklin Heights	Westerville South	Started in 1997	Started in 2004
1996	Hilliard	Delaware Hayes	Grove City	Started in 1997	Started in 2004
1997	Newark	Franklin Heights	Worthington Kilbourne	Upper Arlington	Started in 2004
1998	Gahanna Lincoln	Mount Vernon	Westerville South; Dublin Coffman; Grove City	Upper Arlington	Started in 2004
1999	Pickerington	Marysville	Grove City	Upper Arlington	Started in 2004
2000	Pickerington	Marysville	Westerville South	Upper Arlington	Started in 2004
2001	Gahanna Lincoln; Pickerington	Big Walnut	Hilliard Davidson	Dublin Scioto	Started in 2004
2002	Pickerington	Big Walnut; Mount Vernon; Watkins Memorial	Grove City; Worthington Kilbourne	Dublin Scioto; Upper Arlington	Started in 2004
2003	Lancaster	Big Walnut	Westerville South	Dublin Scioto	Started in 2004
2004	Lancaster; Newark	Olentangy Liberty	Westerville South	Pickerington Central	Hilliard Davidson
2005	Newark	Olentangy Liberty	Worthington Kilbourne	Grove City	Hilliard Davidson
2006	Lancaster	Watkins Memorial; Big Walnut	Westerville Central	Pickerington Central	Hilliard Davidson
2007	Hilliard Darby; Lancaster	Olentangy Liberty; Big Walnut	Marysville; Pickerington North	Pickerington Central	Dublin Coffman
2008	Pickerington Central	Big Walnut	Upper Arlington	Dublin Jerome; Olentangy Liberty; Westerville South	Eliminated after 2008
2009	Pickerington Central	New Albany; Olentangy Orange	Dublin Coffman	Westerville South	Eliminated after 2008
2010	Pickerington Central	New Albany	Hilliard Davidson	Westerville South	Eliminated after 2008
2011	Pickerington Central	Big Walnut; New Albany; Olentangy Orange	Hilliard Davidson	Olentangy Liberty; Westerville Central; Westerville South	Eliminated after 2008
2012	Pickerington Central; Pickerington North	New Albany	Dublin Coffman; Hilliard Davidson,	Hilliard Darby	Eliminated after 2008
2013	Pickerington Central; Pickerington North	Worthington Kilbourne	Hilliard Davidson	Westerville Central	Eliminated after 2008
2014	Pickerington Central	Olentangy	Dublin Coffman	Hilliard Darby	Eliminated after 2008
2015	Pickerington Central	Olentangy	Hilliard Davidson	Westerville Central	Eliminated after 2008
2016	Pickerington Central	New Albany	Hilliard Davidson	Dublin Jerome; Hilliard Bradley	Olentangy Liberty
2017	Pickerington Central	Big Walnut; New Albany	Dublin Coffman	Hilliard Bradley	Olentangy Liberty
2018	Reynoldsburg; Lancaster	Canal Winchester	Hilliard Davidson	Hilliard Bradley	Olentangy; Olentangy Liberty; Olentangy Orange
2019	Pickerington Central	Canal Winchester; Groveport Madison; New Albany	Dublin Coffman; Hilliard Davidson; Upper Arlington	Dublin Jerome	Olentangy Orange
2020	Pickerington North	Westerville South	Dublin Coffman	Marysville	Pickerington Central
2021	New Albany	Big Walnut	Upper Arlington	Marysville	Pickerington Central
2022	Gahanna Lincoln	Westerville South	Dublin Coffman Upper Arlington	Olentangy Berlin	Pickerington Central
2023	Gahanna Lincoln	Canal Winchester	Hilliard Bradley	Olentangy Berlin	Pickerington Central
2024	Gahanna Lincoln	Big Walnut	Olentangy Liberty Olentangy Orange Upper Arlington	Olentangy Berlin	Pickerington Central
2025	Pickerington North	Big Walnut	Olentangy Orange	Olentangy Berlin	Pickerington Central

=== Conference championships by school ===
School	Years of Participation	OCC Championships	Last OCC Championship	Last Outright OCC Championship
Big Walnut	1997–present	11	2025	2025
Canal Winchester	2013–present	4	2023	2023
Central Crossing	2002–present	0	——	——
Chillicothe	1977–2005	3	1990	1990
Delaware Hayes	1968–present	2	1996	1996
Dublin Coffman	1991–present	11	2022	2020
Dublin Jerome	2004–present	3	2019	2019
Dublin Scioto	1995–present	3	2003	2003
Franklin Heights	1981–2024	4	1997	1997
Gahanna Lincoln	1968–present	16	2024	2024
Grove City	1981–present	9	2005	2005
Groveport Madison	1974–present	4	2019	——
Hilliard Bradley	2009–present	4	2023	2023
Hilliard Darby	1997–present	3	2014	2014
Hilliard Davidson	1974–present	17	2019	2018
Lancaster	1997–present	5	2018	2006
Marysville	1991–present	6	2021	2021
Mount Vernon	1968–2016	3	2002	1998
New Albany	2006–present	8	2021	2021
Newark	1997–present	2	2005	2005
Olentangy	1997–present	3	2018	2015
Olentangy Berlin	2018–present	4	2025	2025
Olentangy Liberty	2004–present	9	2024	2017
Olentangy Orange	2008–present	5	2025	2025
Pickerington Central	1981–present	26	2025	2025
Pickerington North	2004–present	4	2025	2025
Pleasant View	1968–1969	0	——	——
Reynoldsburg	1968–present	2	2018	——
Thomas Worthington	1968–present	9	1992	1986
Upper Arlington	1981–present	14	2024	2021
Watkins Memorial	1991–2013	3	2006	——
Westerville Central	2004–present	4	2015	2015
Westerville North	1977–present	5	1995	1995
Westerville South	1968–present	11	2022	2022
Westland	1970–present	3	1993	1993
Whitehall-Yearling	1968–1999	5	1993	1985
Worthington Kilbourne	1991–present	4	2013	2013

=== State tournament results by year ===
- Official OHSAA football tournament began in 1972

Year	School	Division	Result
1974	Upper Arlington^	AAA	Runner Up
1975	Newark^	AAA	Semi-Finalist
1976	Gahanna Lincoln	AAA	Runner Up
1980	Upper Arlington^	I	Semi-Finalist
1981	Upper Arlington	I	Semi-Finalist
1981	Whitehall-Yearling	II	Semi-Finalist
1982	Gahanna Lincoln	I	Semi-Finalist
1984	Whitehall-Yearling	II	Runner Up
1986	Thomas Worthington	I	Semi-Finalist
1988	Westerville North	I	Semi-Finalist
1991	Marysville	II	Semi-Finalist
1993	Hilliard Davidson	I	Semi-Finalist
1994	Westerville South	I	Runner Up
1995	Dublin Scioto	II	State Champion
1997	Upper Arlington	I	Semi-Finalist
1998	Upper Arlington	I	Semi-Finalist
1999	Pickerington Central	I	Semi-Finalist
1999	Worthington Kilbourne	I	Semi-Finalist
2000	Upper Arlington	I	State Champion
2000	Marysville	II	Semi-Finalist
2001	Dublin Coffman	I	Semi-Finalist
2003	Dublin Scioto	I	Semi-Finalist
2004	Worthington Kilbourne	I	Semi-Finalist
2005	Hilliard Davidson	I	Semi-Finalist
2006	Hilliard Davidson	I	State Champion
2006	Pickerington Central	II	Runner Up
2006	New Albany	III	Semi-Finalist
2007	Dublin Coffman	I	Semi-Finalist
2007	Big Walnut	III	State Champion
2008	Pickerington Central	I	Semi-Finalist
2008	Big Walnut	III	Semi-Finalist
2009	Hilliard Davidson	I	State Champion
2010	Hilliard Davidson	I	Semi-Finalist
2011	Pickerington Central	I	Runner Up
2012	Pickerington North	I	Semi-Finalist
2013	Hilliard Davidson	I	Semi-Finalist
2013	New Albany	II	Semi-Finalist
2014	Olentangy	II	Semi-Finalist
2016	Olentangy Liberty	I	Semi-Finalist
2016	Pickerington Central	I	Semi-Finalist
2017	Olentangy Liberty	I	Semi-Finalist
2017	Pickerington Central	I	State Champion
2018	Olentangy Liberty	I	Semi-Finalist
2018	Pickerington Central	I	Semi-Finalist
2019	Pickerington Central	I	State Champion
2020	Pickerington Central	I	Runner Up
2021	Upper Arlington	I	Semi-Finalist
2024	Olentangy Liberty	I	State Champion
2024	Big Walnut	II	Semi-Finalist
2025	Olentangy Orange	I	State Champion
2025	Big Walnut	II	Semi-Finalist

^Result prior to joining Ohio Capital Conference

== Divisional alignments ==
Ohio Capital Conference Divisions (1977-1981)
Capital Division	Ohio Division
Delaware Hayes	Gahanna Lincoln
Hilliard	Groveport Madison
Reynoldsburg	Chillicothe
Westerville North	Westerville South
Mount Vernon	Westland
Whitehall-Yearling	Worthington

Ohio Capital Conference Divisions (1981-1987)
Capital Division	Ohio Division
Chillicothe	Gahanna Lincoln
Delaware Hayes	Grove City
Franklin Heights	Groveport Madison
Hilliard	Reynoldsburg
Mount Vernon	Upper Arlington
Pickerington	Westerville South
Westerville North	Westland
Whitehall-Yearling	Worthington

Ohio Capital Conference Divisions (1987-1991)
Capital Division	Ohio Division
Chillicothe	Gahanna Lincoln
Delaware Hayes	Grove City
Franklin Heights	Groveport Madison
Hilliard	Upper Arlington
Mount Vernon	Westerville North
Pickerington	Westerville South
Reynoldsburg	Westland
Whitehall-Yearling	Worthington

Ohio Capital Conference Divisions (1991–95)
Capital Division	Central Division	Ohio Division
Delaware Hayes	Chillicothe	Gahanna Lincoln
Franklin Heights	Grove City	Dublin
Marysville	Hilliard	Groveport Madison
Mount Vernon	Upper Arlington	Thomas Worthington
Pickerington	Westerville North	Westerville South
Reynoldsburg	Worthington Kilbourne	Westland
Watkins Memorial		
Whitehall-Yearling		

Ohio Capital Conference Divisions (1995–97)
Capital Division	Central Division	Ohio Division
Delaware Hayes	Chillicothe	Gahanna Lincoln
Franklin Heights	Dublin Scioto	Dublin Coffman
Marysville	Grove City	Groveport Madison
Mount Vernon	Pickerington	Hilliard
Watkins Memorial	Reynoldsburg	Newark
Whitehall-Yearling	Upper Arlington	Thomas Worthington
	Westerville South	Westerville North
	Worthington Kilbourne	Westland

Ohio Capital Conference Divisions (1997-2002)
Capital Division	Cardinal Division	Central Division	Ohio Division
Big Walnut	Chillicothe	Dublin Coffman	Gahanna Lincoln
Delaware Hayes	Dublin Scioto	Grove City	Lancaster
Franklin Heights	Hilliard Darby	Groveport Madison	Newark
Marysville	Olentangy	Hilliard Davidson	Pickerington
Mount Vernon	Reynoldsburg	Westerville South	Westerville North
Watkins Memorial	Thomas Worthington	Worthington Kilbourne	Westland
Whitehall-Yearling	Upper Arlington		

Ohio Capital Conference Divisions (2002-2004)
Capital Division	Cardinal Division	Central Division	Ohio Division
Big Walnut	Chillicothe	Grove City	Gahanna Lincoln
Delaware Hayes	Dublin Scioto	Groveport Madison	Dublin Coffman
Franklin Heights	Olentangy	Hilliard Davidson	Central Crossing
Marysville	Thomas Worthington	Reynoldsburg	Hilliard Darby
Mount Vernon	Upper Arlington	Westerville South	Lancaster
Watkins Memorial	Westland	Worthington Kilbourne	Newark
			Pickerington
			Westerville North

Ohio Capital Conference Divisions (2004-2006)
Buckeye Division	Capital Division	Cardinal Division	Central Division	Ohio Division
Dublin Coffman	Big Walnut	Chillicothe	Central Crossing	Gahanna Lincoln
Hilliard Davidson	Dublin Jerome	Dublin Scioto	Delaware Hayes	Groveport Madison
Reynoldsburg	Franklin Heights	Grove City	Marysville	Hilliard Darby
Thomas Worthington	Olentangy Liberty	Olentangy	Mount Vernon	Lancaster
Westerville North	Pickerington North	Pickerington Central	Westerville South	Newark
Westland	Watkins Memorial	Westerville Central	Worthington Kilbourne	Upper Arlington

Ohio Capital Conference Divisions (2006-2008)
Buckeye Division	Capital Division	Cardinal Division	Central Division	Ohio Division
Dublin Coffman	Big Walnut	Dublin Jerome	Central Crossing	Gahanna Lincoln
Grove City	Dublin Scioto	Mt. Vernon	Delaware Hayes	Groveport Madison
Hilliard Davidson	Franklin Heights	Olentangy	Marysville	Hilliard Darby
Reynoldsburg	New Albany	Pickerington Central	Pickerington North	Lancaster
Upper Arlington	Olentangy Liberty	Westerville South	Thomas Worthington	Newark
Westerville North	Watkins Memorial	Worthington Kilbourne	Westerville Central	Westland

Ohio Capital Conference Divisions (2008-2012)
Capital Division	Cardinal Division	Central Division	Ohio Division
Big Walnut	Dublin Jerome	Central Crossing	Gahanna Lincoln
Delaware Hayes	Dublin Scioto	Dublin Coffman	Grove City
Franklin Heights	Marysville	Hilliard Darby	Groveport Madison
Hilliard Bradley	Olentangy	Hilliard Davidson	Lancaster
Mount Vernon	Olentangy Liberty	Upper Arlington	Newark
New Albany	Westerville Central	Thomas Worthington	Pickerington Central
Olentangy Orange	Westerville North	Worthington Kilbourne	Pickerington North
Watkins Memorial	Westerville South	Westland	Reynoldsburg

Ohio Capital Conference Divisions (2012-2013)
Capital Division	Cardinal Division	Central Division	Ohio Division
Big Walnut	Dublin Jerome	Central Crossing	Gahanna Lincoln
Delaware Hayes	Dublin Scioto	Dublin Coffman	Grove City
Franklin Heights	Hilliard Bradley	Hilliard Davidson	Groveport Madison
Mount Vernon	Hilliard Darby	Marysville	Lancaster
New Albany	Westerville Central	Olentangy Liberty	Newark
Olentangy	Westerville North	Thomas Worthington	Pickerington Central
Olentangy Orange	Westerville South	Upper Arlington	Pickerington North
Watkins Memorial	Worthington Kilbourne	Westland	Reynoldsburg

Ohio Capital Conference Divisions (2013-2016)
Capital Division	Cardinal Division	Central Division	Ohio Division
Big Walnut	Canal Winchester	Central Crossing	Gahanna Lincoln
Delaware Hayes	Dublin Jerome	Dublin Coffman	Grove City
Franklin Heights	Dublin Scioto	Hilliard Davidson	Groveport Madison
Mount Vernon	Hilliard Bradley	Marysville	Lancaster
New Albany	Hilliard Darby	Olentangy Liberty	Newark
Olentangy	Westerville Central	Thomas Worthington	Pickerington Central
Olentangy Orange	Westerville North	Upper Arlington	Pickerington North
Worthington Kilbourne	Westerville South	Westland	Reynoldsburg

Ohio Capital Conference Divisions (2016-2020)
Buckeye Division	Capital Division	Cardinal Division	Central Division	Ohio Division
Olentangy	Big Walnut	Delaware Hayes	Central Crossing	Gahanna Lincoln
Olentangy Liberty	Canal Winchester	Dublin Jerome	Dublin Coffman	Grove City
Olentangy Orange	Franklin Heights	Dublin Scioto	Hilliard Davidson	Lancaster
Westerville Central	Groveport Madison	Hilliard Bradley	Marysville	Pickerington Central
Westerville North	New Albany	Hilliard Darby	Upper Arlington	Pickerington North
Westerville South	Newark	Olentangy Berlin (2018)	Westland	Reynoldsburg
		Thomas Worthington		
		Worthington Kilbourne		

Ohio Capital Conference Divisions (2020-2024)
Buckeye Division	Capital Division	Cardinal Division	Central Division	Ohio Division
Central Crossing	Big Walnut	Dublin Jerome	Dublin Coffman	Gahanna Lincoln
Groveport Madison	Canal Winchester	Hilliard Darby	Hilliard Bradley	Grove City
Lancaster	Delaware Hayes	Marysville	Hilliard Davidson	New Albany
Newark	Dublin Scioto	Olentangy	Olentangy Liberty	Pickerington North
Pickerington Central	Franklin Heights	Olentangy Berlin	Olentangy Orange	Westerville Central
Reynoldsburg	Westerville North	Thomas Worthington	Upper Arlington	Westland
	Westerville South			
	Worthington Kilbourne			

Ohio Capital Conference Divisions (2024-2025)
Buckeye Division	Capital Division	Cardinal Division	Central Division	Ohio Division
Canal Winchester	Big Walnut	Dublin Jerome	Dublin Coffman	Central Crossing
Groveport Madison	Delaware Hayes	Hilliard Darby	Hilliard Bradley	Gahanna Lincoln
Lancaster	Dublin Scioto	Marysville	Hilliard Davidson	Grove City
Logan	Westland	Olentangy	Olentangy Liberty	New Albany
Newark	Westerville North	Olentangy Berlin	Olentangy Orange	Pickerington North
Pickerington Central	Westerville South	Thomas Worthington	Upper Arlington	Westerville Central
Reynoldsburg	Worthington Kilbourne			
Teays Valley				
