= Dublin Scioto High School =

Public, coeducational high school in Dublin, Ohio, United States

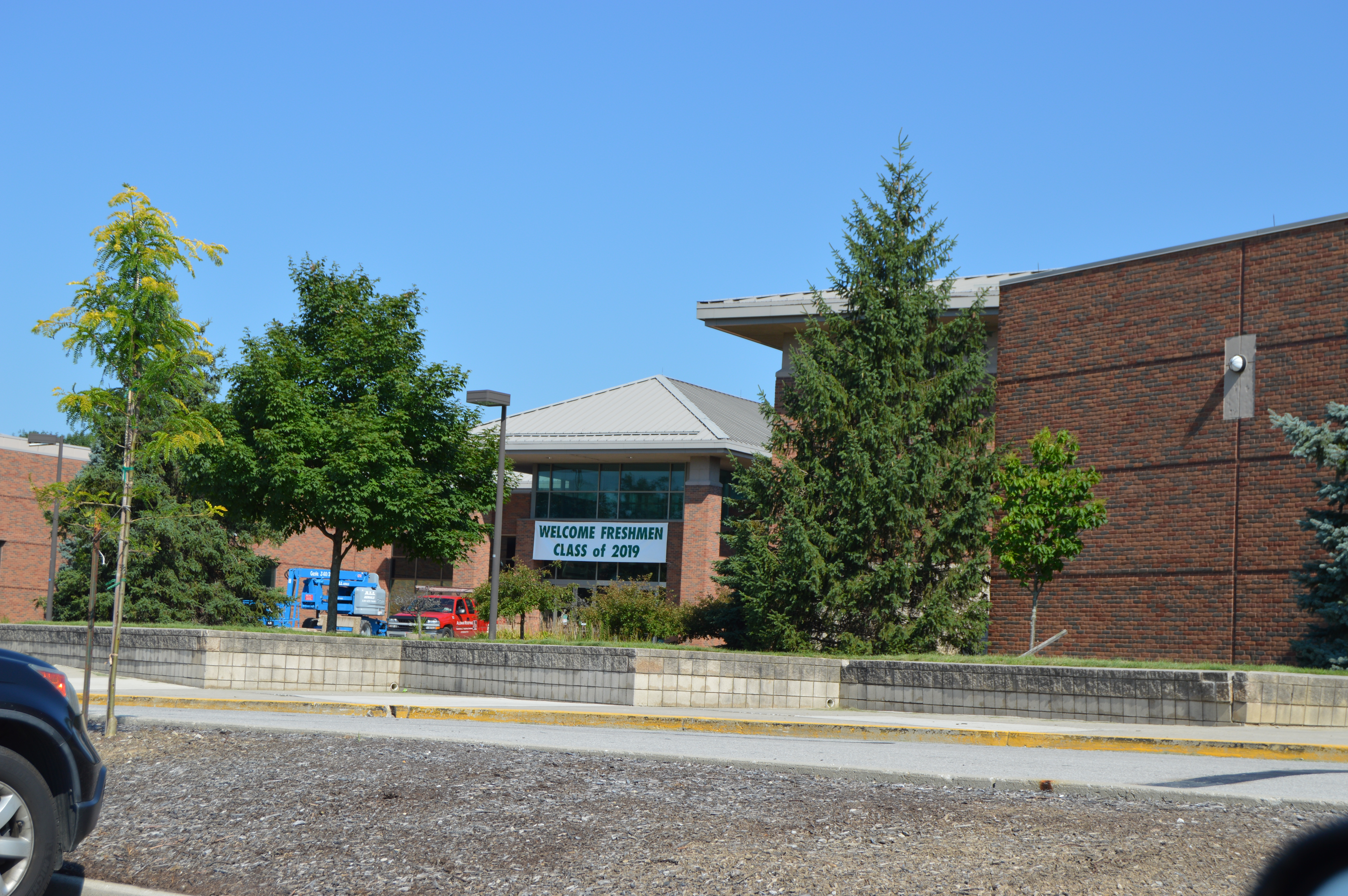
- Dublin Scioto High School

Location
- 4000 Hard Road; Dublin, (Franklin County), Ohio 43016; United States; 40°7′16″N 83°6′1″W

Information
- Type: Public, Coeducational high school
- Opened: 1995
- School district: Dublin City Schools
- Superintendent: John Marschhausen
- CEEB code: 361997
- President: Chris Valentine
- Principal: Tom Cochran
- Grades: 9–12
- Student to teacher ratio: 18.41
- Colors: Green, Silver and White
- Fight song: Dublin Scioto Fight Song
- Athletics conference: Ohio Capital Conference
- Nickname: Irish
- Team name: Fighting Irish
- Accreditation: North Central Association of Colleges and Schools
- Newspaper: Irish Eye
- Yearbook: The Torrent
- Website: https://scioto.dublinschools.net/

Dublin Scioto High School is a public high school located in Dublin, Ohio, a suburb northwest of Columbus, Ohio. Dublin Scioto High School was constructed in 1995 at 4000 Hard Road between Sawmill Road and Riverside Drive.

== Attendance boundary ==
The school's boundary includes, in addition to portions of Dublin, portions of Columbus.

== Academics ==
=== Faculty ===
Scioto has 110 certificated staff. The principal is Tom Cochran.

=== Junior State of America ===
Founded in September 2007, Dublin Scioto's Junior State of America club has become a vibrant part of the Scioto community. From 2007 to 2014, the Junior State of America chapter attended dozens of JSA conventions in Cincinnati, Washington, D.C., and downtown Columbus. During this same time period, three Dublin Scioto students won gubernatorial races in the Ohio River Valley Junior State. Liz Litteral and D. Winston Underwood Jr. were elected by their peers to serve as governor from 2009 to 2010 and 2013 to 2014, respectively. Tim Kocher was elected lieutenant governor for the 2012–2013 term. D. Winston Underwood Jr. also served as mayor of the Central Ohio District from 2012 to 2013.

=== Quiz Team ===
Dublin Scioto has consistently wielded a strong Quiz Team that competes mainly in the In The Know tournament produced by WOSU and supported by Westfield Insurance. In recent years, Dublin Scioto has advanced far under the leadership of Advisor Tim Hayes. Under captain Laszlo Seress, the 2009–2010 team advanced to the semifinals. The following year under the leadership of Senior Captains Meredith Haddix and Suhas Gudhe, in addition to Senior Alex Filice and Freshman Arjun Venkataraman, the team advanced to the In The Know finals. Along the way, the team upset strong programs such as Olentangy Liberty High School, Bishop Watterson High School, and cross town rivals Dublin Coffman. The 2011–2012 In The Know team, known as the Redeem Team, featured sophomore captain Arjun Venkataraman, senior president Ben Albert, senior Nick Gorelov. After defeating Wheelersburg High School and Grandview Heights High School in the first two rounds, Dublin Scioto faced Rutherford B. Hayes High School (Delaware, Ohio). Dublin Scioto defeated Hayes and proceeded to defeat Bishop Watterson High School. Following that victory, the team slipped past Mount Vernon High School and defeated Bexley High School. In that, Dublin Scioto won the state championship.. They also finished in second at the 2018 PACE National Scholastic Championship.

=== Change of curriculum ===
The curriculum and student handbook at Dublin Scioto High School as well as at the other two high schools in the Dublin City School District were revised in order to conform with the International Baccalaureate degree program. These changes, which took effect in the 2008–09 school year, include a shift from a seven period day to an eight period day; and a change from year long 1.0 credit courses to semester 0.5 credit courses.

=== Irish Marching Band ===
The 100 member Irish Marching Band, Established in 1995 and currently directed by Andrew Doherty, performs at all home and away games, competitions, and frequently travels to perform at Walt Disney World. The Irish Marching Band is known for their unique shows and musicality. They have performed at every OMEA State Marching Band Finals since being established in 1995. The band won $20,000 in the Metallica For Whom The Band Tolls! competition, receiving second place in the Medium High School category and Fan Favorite across all schools.

== Athletics ==
=== Ohio High School Athletic Association State Championships ===
- Football – 1995
- Wrestling – Al Bilins(1998, 275 lbs), Randy Languis(2010, 140 lbs), Ty Wilson(2021, 113 lbs, 2022, 132 lbs)

==== Other Non-Sanctioned State Championships ====
- Boys' Lacrosse – 1997, 1999, 2003

== Notable alumni ==
- Eric Brunner (class of 2004), former MLS defender for Houston Dynamo
- Nick Goings (class of 1996), former NFL fullback for the Carolina Panthers
- Alex Golesh (class of 2002), football coach who is currently the head coach of the Auburn Tigers
- Sean Kuraly NHL forward for the Columbus Blue Jackets
- Bradley McDougald (class of 2009), former NFL safety for the Seattle Seahawks
- Deji Olatoye (class of 2009), NFL cornerback for the Atlanta Falcons
- Jay Richardson (class of 2002), former NFL defensive end
- Eric Stamets (class of 2009), former baseball player in the Cleveland Indians organization
- Tamara Witmer (class of 2002), Playboy Playmate of the Month, Miss August 2005, cover girl for October 2006 issue and appeared as Miss May in the Playboy Playmate Video Calendar of 2007

== See also ==
- Dublin City School District
- Dublin Coffman High School
- Dublin Jerome High School
