= OBHS =

OBHS is an acronym for:

- Old Bridge High School in New Jersey, United States
- Otago Boys' High School in Dunedin, New Zealand
- Oyster Bay High School in Oyster Bay, New York
- Olentangy Berlin High School in Delaware, Ohio
