= Adam Shaheen =

American football player (born 1994)

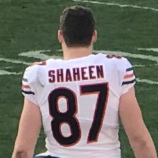
- Shaheen with the Chicago Bears in 2018

No. 87, 80
- Position: Tight end

Personal information
- Born: October 24, 1994 (age 32); Galena, Ohio, U.S.
- Listed height: 6 ft 7 in (2.01 m)
- Listed weight: 257 lb (117 kg)

Career information
- High school: Big Walnut (Sunbury, Ohio)
- College: Ashland (2014–2016)
- NFL draft: 2017: 2nd round, 45th overall pick

Career history
- Chicago Bears (2017–2019); Miami Dolphins (2020–2022)

Career NFL statistics
- Receptions: 50
- Receiving yards: 509
- Receiving touchdowns: 7
- Stats at Pro Football Reference

Adam Shaheen (born October 24, 1994) is an American former professional football player who was a tight end in the National Football League (NFL). He played college football for the Ashland Eagles, and was selected by the Chicago Bears in the second round of the 2017 NFL draft. He is the highest draft pick from Ashland in the modern era of the NFL.

== Early life ==
Shaheen attended Big Walnut High School in Sunbury, Ohio. He played football and basketball in high school.

== College career ==
Shaheen played one year of college basketball at the University of Pittsburgh at Johnstown. In 2014, he transferred to Ashland University and joined the football team as a walk-on. During his career, he had 129 receptions for 1,755 yards and 26 touchdowns. After the 2016 season, Shaheen decided to forgo his senior year and enter the 2017 NFL draft.

== Professional career ==
=== Pre-draft ===
On January 5, 2017, it was announced that Shaheen would forgo his senior season and enter the 2017 NFL draft. At the time of the announcement, he was ranked the 12th best tight end prospect in the draft by CBS Sports and NFLDraftScout.com. Shaheen was one of 19 tight ends invited to the NFL Scouting Combine in Indianapolis, Indiana. He fared well in the combine drills and tied Oregon's Pharaoh Brown for first in the bench press with 24 reps. Shaheen had his best performance during positional drills, showing his agility and receiving ability. He received a boost in his draft stock after he impressed scouts and team representatives with his performance in the positional drills.

Prior to the combine, Shaheen was a relatively unknown prospect out of Division II Ashland University. He received media attention after an interview at the combine where he was asked by a reporter how he gained 70 lbs. during college, with Shaheen responding, "Um, a lot of Chipotle burritos." He went on to reiterate, "In all honesty, it was a lot of burritos." The quote and story went on to be posted on websites by the Bleacher Report, New York Daily News, USA Today, and ESPN, with the New England Patriots' website donning him the "Chipotle Prospect". On March 22, 2017, Shaheen opted to participate at Ashland's Pro Day and chose to only run positional drills. Scouts and team representatives from 16 NFL teams attended, including tight end coaches from the Pittsburgh Steelers, Chicago Bears, New Orleans Saints, Oakland Raiders, and Detroit Lions. Shaheen had multiple visits and private workouts with NFL teams, including the Philadelphia Eagles, Cleveland Browns, Tennessee Titans, Arizona Cardinals, Tampa Bay Buccaneers, and Dallas Cowboys. The majority of NFL draft experts and analysts projected him to be a second round pick. He was ranked the fourth best tight end prospect in the draft by NFLDraftScout.com and NFL analyst Mike Mayock and was ranked the fifth best tight end by ESPN.

Pre-draft measurables
Height	Weight	Arm length	Hand span	40-yard dash	10-yard split	20-yard split	20-yard shuttle	Three-cone drill	Vertical jump	Broad jump	Bench press	Wonderlic
6 ft 6 1/2 in (1.99 m)	278 lb (126 kg)	33 1/2 in (0.85 m)	9 5/8 in (0.24 m)	4.79 s	1.71 s	2.80 s	4.38 s	7.09 s	32.5 in (0.83 m)	10 ft 1 in (3.07 m)	24 reps	24
All values from NFL Combine

=== Chicago Bears ===
==== 2017 ====
The Chicago Bears selected Shaheen in the second round with the 45th overall pick in the 2017 NFL draft. The Bears originally owned the 36th overall pick in the second round, but opted to trade the selection with their seventh round pick (221st overall) to the Cardinals and acquired their second round (45th), fourth round (119th overall), and sixth round picks (197th overall). Shaheen is the second-highest player to be drafted from Ashland University. He joins Jeris Pendleton (2012), Bill Overmyer (1972), and Len Pettigrew (1971) as the only players to be drafted from Ashland. On May 19, 2017, the Bears signed Shaheen to a four-year, $5.91 million contract with $3.17 million guaranteed and a signing bonus of $2.43 million.

Throughout training camp, Shaheen competed against Daniel Brown and Ben Braunecker for the job as the third tight end on the depth chart. Head coach John Fox named Shaheen the third tight end on the Bears' depth chart to begin the regular season, behind veterans Zach Miller and Dion Sims.

He made his professional regular season debut in the Bears' season-opening 23–17 loss to the Atlanta Falcons. On September 24, Shaheen made his first career start and caught the first pass of his career on a two-yard touchdown pass from quarterback Mike Glennon during their 23–17 overtime victory. His first career touchdown reception came in the second quarter as Shaheen was left wide open on a blown coverage by the Steelers. Throughout the first seven regular season games, Shaheen was predominantly used as a blocking tight end in two and three tight end sets. During a Week 8 matchup against the Saints, starting tight end Zach Miller suffered a dislocated knee and tore his popliteal artery. Miller was placed on injured reserve for the remainder of the season and Shaheen became the second starting tight end, along with Dion Sims. In Week 11, he made his third consecutive start and caught a season-high four passes for 41-yards and caught a one-yard touchdown pass from Mitchell Trubisky during the Bears' 27–24 loss to the Detroit Lions. On December 10, Shaheen caught four passes for a season-high 44 receiving yards and scored on a one-yard touchdown reception during Chicago's 33–7 routing of the Cincinnati Bengals. He injured his chest during the game and was inactive for the following week. As a rookie, Shaheen finished with 12 receptions for 127 yards and three touchdowns.

==== 2018 ====
In 2018, Shaheen was slated to be the Bears starting tight end. However, in the team's second preseason game, Shaheen suffered a sprained ankle and foot. He was placed on injured reserve on September 2, 2018, with the possibility of returning later in the season. He was activated off injured reserve on November 17, 2018. Playing in six games, he recorded five catches for 48 yards and a touchdown.

==== 2019 ====
Shaheen entered the 2019 season second on the Bears tight end depth chart behind Trey Burton. He was placed on injured reserve on November 30, 2019. He finished the season with nine catches for 74 yards and no touchdowns.

=== Miami Dolphins ===
On July 26, 2020, Shaheen was traded to the Miami Dolphins for a conditional seventh-round pick. In Week 5 against the San Francisco 49ers, he recorded his first touchdown with the Dolphins in the 43–17 victory. On October 28, Shaheen signed a two-year, $7.65 million contract extension with the Dolphins. He finished the regular season with 12 receptions for 150 receiving yards and three receiving touchdowns in 16 games and five starts. In the 2021 season, Shaheen appeared in 12 games and started seven. He recorded 12 receptions for 110 receiving yards.

On August 9, 2022, the Dolphins agreed to trade Shaheen along with a 2023 seventh-round pick to the Houston Texans in exchange for a 2023 sixth-round pick. Two days later, the trade was cancelled due to Shaheen being unable to pass a physical. The Dolphins placed him on injured reserve on August 16.
