= Jarren Williams (defensive back) =

American football player (born 1997)

No. 38, 34, 33
- Position: Cornerback

Personal information
- Born: July 18, 1997 (age 29); Columbus, Ohio, U.S.
- Listed height: 5 ft 11 in (1.80 m)
- Listed weight: 190 lb (86 kg)

Career information
- High school: Olentangy (Lewis Center, Ohio)
- College: Albany
- NFL draft: 2020: undrafted

Career history
- Arizona Cardinals (2020)*; New York Giants (2020–2021); Detroit Lions (2022)
- * Offseason or practice squad member only

Career NFL statistics
- Total tackles: 19
- Pass deflections: 1
- Stats at Pro Football Reference

Jarren Williams (born July 18, 1997) is an American former professional football player who was a cornerback in the National Football League (NFL). He played college football for the Albany Great Danes.

== Professional career ==
=== Arizona Cardinals ===
Williams was signed by the Arizona Cardinals as an undrafted free agent following the 2020 NFL draft on April 27, 2020. He was waived on July 26, 2020, due to Covid restrictions.

=== New York Giants ===
Williams signed with the New York Giants on August 2, 2020. In his first NFL start, Williams had five tackles and one pass defended in New York's 21–6 loss to the Dallas Cowboys on December 19. He played 70 out of 71 possible defensive snaps and earned a strong 82.0 grade from Pro Football Focus. He followed that with a solid 74.4 grade in the 34–10 loss to the Philadelphia Eagles. Williams had five tackles and played 61 of 63 snaps on defense. He also played his customary special teams role in both games.

On March 16, 2022, Williams signed an exclusive rights tender with the Giants. He was waived/injured on August 1, 2022, and placed on injured reserve with a hamstring injury. On August 5, 2022, Williams was waived off injured reserve on an injury settlement.

=== Detroit Lions ===
On November 29, 2022, Williams was signed to the Detroit Lions practice squad. Activated for two games this season, playing only on special teams. He signed a reserve/future contract on January 9, 2023. He was waived on August 4, 2023, from injured reserve with an injury settlement.
