= Olentangy Orange High School =

Location
- 2840 East Orange Road; Lewis Center, Ohio 43035; United States; 40°10′18″N 82°58′44″W

Information
- Type: Public high school
- Founded: 2008
- School district: Olentangy Local School District
- NCES School ID: 390467605390
- Principal: Ellie Ellis
- Teaching staff: 90.66 (on an FTE basis)
- Grades: 9–12
- Enrollment: 1,967 (2023-2024)
- Student to teacher ratio: 21.70
- Colors: Orange and Blue
- Fight song: Fight On!
- Athletics conference: Ohio Capital Conference
- Team name: Pioneers
- Rivals: Olentangy Liberty
- Publication: The Courier, The Frontier
- Yearbook: The Bronze Bayonet
- Website: oohs.olentangy.k12.oh.us

Olentangy Orange High School is a public high school in Orange Township, Delaware County, Ohio, United States. It is part of the Olentangy Local School District.

== Ohio High School Athletic Association State Championships ==
- Boys Basketball - 2025
- Girls Golf - 2016, 2017
- Girls Wrestling - 2024, 2025 (Team) 2023, 2025, 2026 (Duals)
- Football - 2025

== Notable alumni ==
- Zach Harrison, football player
- Sebastian Berhalter, soccer midfielder for Middlesbrough F.C. and the U.S. Men's National Team.

== See also ==
- Olentangy Berlin High School
- Olentangy High School
- Olentangy Liberty High School
