= Olentangy High School =

Olentangy High School (OHS)

Location
- 675 Lewis Center Road; Lewis Center, Ohio 43035; United States; 40°12′18″N 83°1′15″W

Information
- Type: Public, Coeducational
- Opened: 1953; 73 years ago
- School district: Olentangy Local School District
- Superintendent: Mark Raiff
- Principal: Nichole Crothers
- Teaching staff: 81.33 (on an FTE basis)
- Grades: 9-12
- Enrollment: 1,721 (2023-2024)
- Student to teacher ratio: 21.16
- Campus: Suburban
- Colors: Blue and Gold
- Slogan: Home of the Braves
- Athletics: Yes
- Athletics conference: Ohio Capital Conference
- Nickname: Braves
- Publication: The Beacon
- Yearbook: Golden Arrow
- Website: ohs.olentangy.k12.oh.us

Olentangy High School is a public comprehensive secondary school located in Lewis Center, Ohio, operated by the Olentangy Local School District.

In 2007, the school was ranked as the 97th best high school in the U.S. by Newsweek. Then, in 2012 the school was ranked tenth in the state by U.S. News For the school year of 2011-2012 the high school received an "Excellent" on the preliminary state report card.

== Overview ==
Olentangy High School opened in 1953 on Shanahan Road for students in grades 9–12. Since 1990, the district has experienced significant enrollment growth. The school district has opened fifteen elementary schools, three additional high schools, Olentangy Liberty High School, Olentangy Orange High School, and Olentangy Berlin High School, and a fifth middle school, Berkshire Middle School which opened in August 2011.

The nickname for the school's athletic teams is the Braves and the girls teams are the Lady Braves.

== History ==
In the early 1900s one room school houses scattered among the landscape made up the local education system in Delaware County. Beginning in 1911, those schools consolidated into four K-12 facilities throughout the county. The Powell school was the first to open in 1911 followed by Hyatts in 1914, Berlin in 1915 and Orange in 1916. These were the only schools in the area until 1952 when construction began on one consolidated school located on Shanahan Road. The new school, Olentangy High School, allowed students in grades 1–8 to remain at their original school then come together for grades 9–12.

In 1961 Liberty Union Elementary School was built as a junior high school for kindergarten, seventh and eighth grade students. The new school was built as a neighbor to the Olentangy High School on Shanahan Road and was open to students in 1963.

In 1969 some major changes began when the Orange school closed and the Shanahan Road complex housed students in grades K-12 for the first time. In 1973, Berlin, Hyatts and Powell schools also closed bringing all of the students in the area to one general location on Shanahan Road. The connection between the Liberty Union Elementary School and Olentangy High School was completed allowing room for all students in one general campus. The district continued operating this way until 1990 when the current Olentangy High School was opened on Lewis Center Road. As of 2024, the building on Shanahan Road remains open as a middle school. On March 4, 2008, the Olentangy school district passed its levy and bond that was proposed by Superintendent Scott Davis.

== Athletics ==
The school screens for drug use in all sports, with 10% of student-athletes chosen randomly at the start of each season for drug testing. The boys lacrosse team were the 1998 Division 3 State Champions. In 2005, the girls lacrosse team brought home a Division 2 State Championship title for the Braves. In 2025, the baseball team won their first state championship. The official colors of the school's athletic teams are royal blue and athletic gold.

== Notable alumni ==
- Kenny Anunike - former NFL football player
- Ethan Grunkemeyer - college football quarterback (Virginia Tech, 2026)
- Zac Kerin - NFL football player
- Beth Lear - Member of the Ohio House of Representatives
- Gary LeVox - musician
- Joshua Perry - former NFL football player
- Jarren Williams - NFL football player
