= Zach Harrison =

American football player (born 2001)

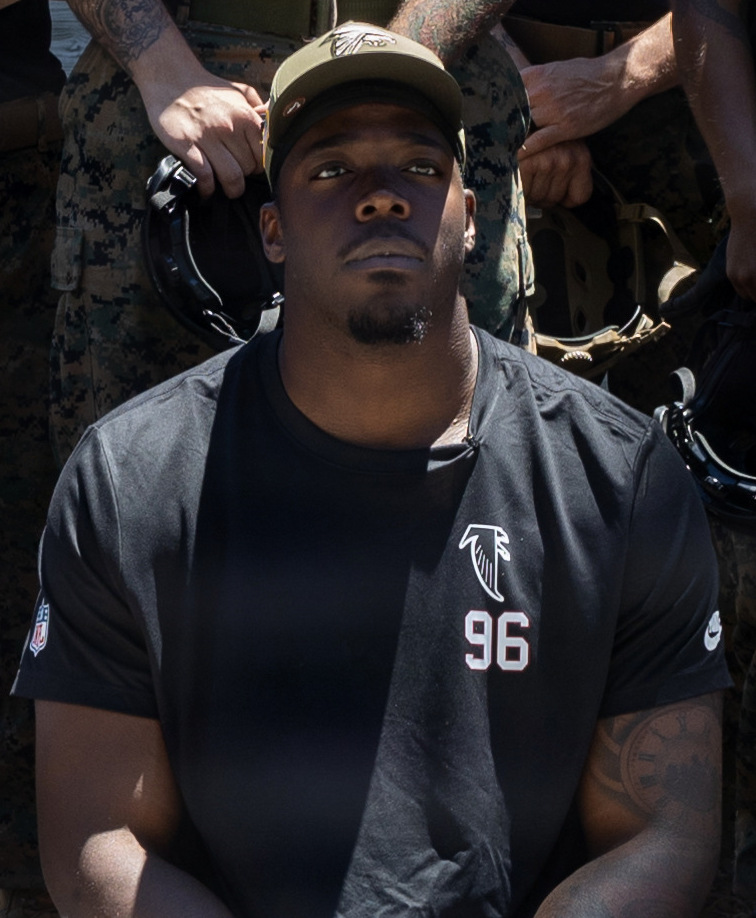
- Harrison in 2026

No. 96 – Atlanta Falcons
- Position: Defensive tackle
- Roster status: Active

Personal information
- Born: August 14, 2001 (age 25); Lewis Center, Ohio, U.S.
- Listed height: 6 ft 5 in (1.96 m)
- Listed weight: 270 lb (122 kg)

Career information
- High school: Olentangy Orange (Lewis Center)
- College: Ohio State (2019–2022)
- NFL draft: 2023: 3rd round, 75th overall pick

Career history
- Atlanta Falcons (2023–present)

Awards and highlights
- First-team All-Big Ten (2022); 2× second-team All-Big Ten (2020, 2021)

Career NFL statistics as of Week 7, 2026
- Total tackles: 95
- Sacks: 9
- Forced fumbles: 2
- Pass deflections: 4
- Stats at Pro Football Reference

Zachary Harrison (born August 14, 2001) is an American professional football defensive tackle for the Atlanta Falcons of the National Football League (NFL). He played college football for the Ohio State Buckeyes.

== Early life ==
Harrison attended Olentangy Orange High School in Lewis Center, Ohio. He played in the 2019 All-American Bowl. A five-star recruit, Harrison committed to Ohio State University to play college football.

== College career ==
Harrison spent his true freshman season at Ohio State in 2019. He played in all 14 games with one start and had 24 tackles and 3.5 sacks.

== Professional career ==
Pre-draft measurables
Height	Weight	Arm length	Hand span	Wingspan	20-yard shuttle	Three-cone drill	Vertical jump	Broad jump	Bench press
6 ft 5 1/2 in (1.97 m)	274 lb (124 kg)	36 1/4 in (0.92 m)	10 in (0.25 m)	7 ft 1 1/2 in (2.17 m)	4.66 s	7.33 s	34.5 in (0.88 m)	10 ft 3 in (3.12 m)	25 reps
All values from NFL Combine/Pro Day

Harrison was selected by the Atlanta Falcons in the third round, 75th overall, of the 2023 NFL draft. As a rookie, he appeared in 16 games. He finished with three sacks, 33 total tackles (18 solo), and one pass defended.

Harrison entered the 2025 season as one of Atlanta's starting defensive linemen, recording one pass deflections, two forced fumbles, 4.5 sacks, and 22 combined tackles. On November 22, 2025, Harrison was placed on injured reserve due to a knee injury.

On August 31, 2026, Harrison was waived by the Falcons and re-signed to the practice squad. On September 22, Harrison was signed to the active roster.

== NFL career statistics ==
=== Regular season ===
Year	Team	Games		Tackles					Fumbles				Interceptions			
Year	Team	GP	GS	Cmb	Solo	Ast	Sck	TFL	FF	FR	Yds	TD	Int	Yds	TD	PD
2023	ATL	16	0	33	18	15	3	4	0	0	0	0	0	0	0	1
2024	ATL	17	1	26	6	20	1	3	0	0	0	0	0	0	0	2
2025	ATL	7	7	22	9	13	4.5	5	2	0	0	0	0	0	0	1
Career		40	8	81	33	48	8.5	12	0	0	0	0	0	0	0	4
