= Olentangy Local School District =

School district in Ohio, United States

Address
- 7840 Graphics Way Lewis Center, Ohio, 43035; United States

District information
- Type: Public
- Motto: Flourish Here
- Grades: PreK–12
- Established: 1952; 74 years ago
- Superintendent: Todd Meyer
- Schools: 29
- NCES District ID: 3904676

Students and staff
- Students: 24,133 (2024–2025)
- Teachers: 1,264.57 (on an FTE basis) (2024–2025)
- Staff: 3,891.20 (on an FTE basis) (2024–2025)
- Student–teacher ratio: 19.08 (2024–2025)
- Athletic conference: Ohio Capital Conference
- Colors: Olentangy: Berlin: Liberty: Orange:

Other information
- Website: www.olentangy.k12.oh.us

The Olentangy Local School District is a large school district centered in southern Delaware County, with a small, southern portion (one cul-de-sac) in Franklin County in the U.S. state of Ohio. The Olentangy Local School District comprises 95 square miles (250 km^{2}) and serves students from all or parts of numerous municipalities, including the unincorporated community of Lewis Center and the cities of Columbus, Delaware, Powell, and Westerville. The district also serves students from Berkshire, Berlin, Concord, Genoa, Liberty, and Orange townships in Delaware County.

As of February 2026, it operates 17 elementary schools, six middle schools, and four high schools. Making a total of 27 schools. There is also an Olentangy Academy building that is home to the district's STEM Academy, Teacher Academy, and Academy for Community Transition (ACT). In addition, OASIS is offered as an online school for select students.

Olentangy is the largest district in Delaware County. In 1998, the district had an enrollment of 4,812. By winter of 2025, it has grown to over 24,000 students - the fourth largest district in Ohio, behind only Columbus, Cleveland and Cincinnati. In Fall 2025, Olentangy reported that it is experiencing rapid and accelerating enrollment growth— which is not new to the district. Climbing enrollment has historically seen classroom additions and new buildings to meet growth. Preschool enrollment has increased 57% over the past decade, and elementary schools have added the equivalent of seven classrooms of students each year for the past ten years. For the 2025-26 school year, the current enrollment in grades 5–8 now exceeds grades 9–12. With new homes and roads already underway across the District, pressure on our schools will only continue to grow. Fall 2025 enrollment projections demonstrate a 16% increase over the next two years, with student enrollment surpassing 28,300 by the 2035-36 school year.

The no new millage bond passed in November 2025 will build an 18th elementary school and a 5th high school.

== History ==
=== Allegations of racism ===
In 2018, Olentangy high school students complained of racism in their high school, and told the school board that their teachers dismissed their concerns and did not punish the use of racial slurs. Olentangy's superintendent admitted to the Columbus Dispatch that the racist incidents had occurred, and school board president Mindy Patrick reportedly responded by saying that she was "disappointed and saddened" to learn of the racist harassment.

=== Censorship of Dr. Seuss ===
During the taping of a "Planet Money" radio segment for NPR News, Olentangy's assistant director of communications Amanda Beeman interrupted and forbade the reading of the Dr. Seuss book "The Sneetches." She did so in response to students identifying Seuss's themes opposing racism, and saying that she wanted to keep the classroom "discussion that we wanted around economics." Students protested, saying that they "want to read it" but Beeman forbade them from reading it. Beeman later admitted that she "wish[ed] she had handled the situation differently."

== Schools ==
=== Elementary ===
- Alum Creek Elementary School (ACES)
- Arrowhead Elementary School (AES)
- Cheshire Elementary School (CES)
- Freedom Trail Elementary School (FTES)
- Deer Haven Elementary School (DHES)
- Glen Oak Elementary School (GOES)
- Heritage Elementary School (HES)
- Indian Springs Elementary School (ISES)
- Johnnycake Elementary School (JCES)
- Liberty Tree Elementary School (LTES)
- Oak Creek Elementary School (OCES)
- Olentangy Meadows Elementary School (OMES)
- Peachblow Crossing Elementary School (PCES)
- Scioto Ridge Elementary School (SRES)
- Shale Meadows Elementary School (SMES)
- Tyler Run Elementary School (TRES)
- Walnut Creek Elementary School (WCES)
- Wyandot Run Elementary School (WRES)

Grades: K-5

=== Middle ===
- Olentangy Berkshire Middle School (OBMS)
- Olentangy Hyatts Middle School (OHMS)
- Olentangy Liberty Middle School (OLMS)
- Olentangy Orange Middle School (OOMS)
- Olentangy Shanahan Middle School (OSMS)
- Olentangy Berlin Middle School (OBLMS)

Grades: 6-8

=== High ===
- Olentangy Berlin High School
- Olentangy Liberty High School
- Olentangy Orange High School
- Olentangy High School

Grades: 9-12
