= A. J. Arcuri =

American football player (born 1997)

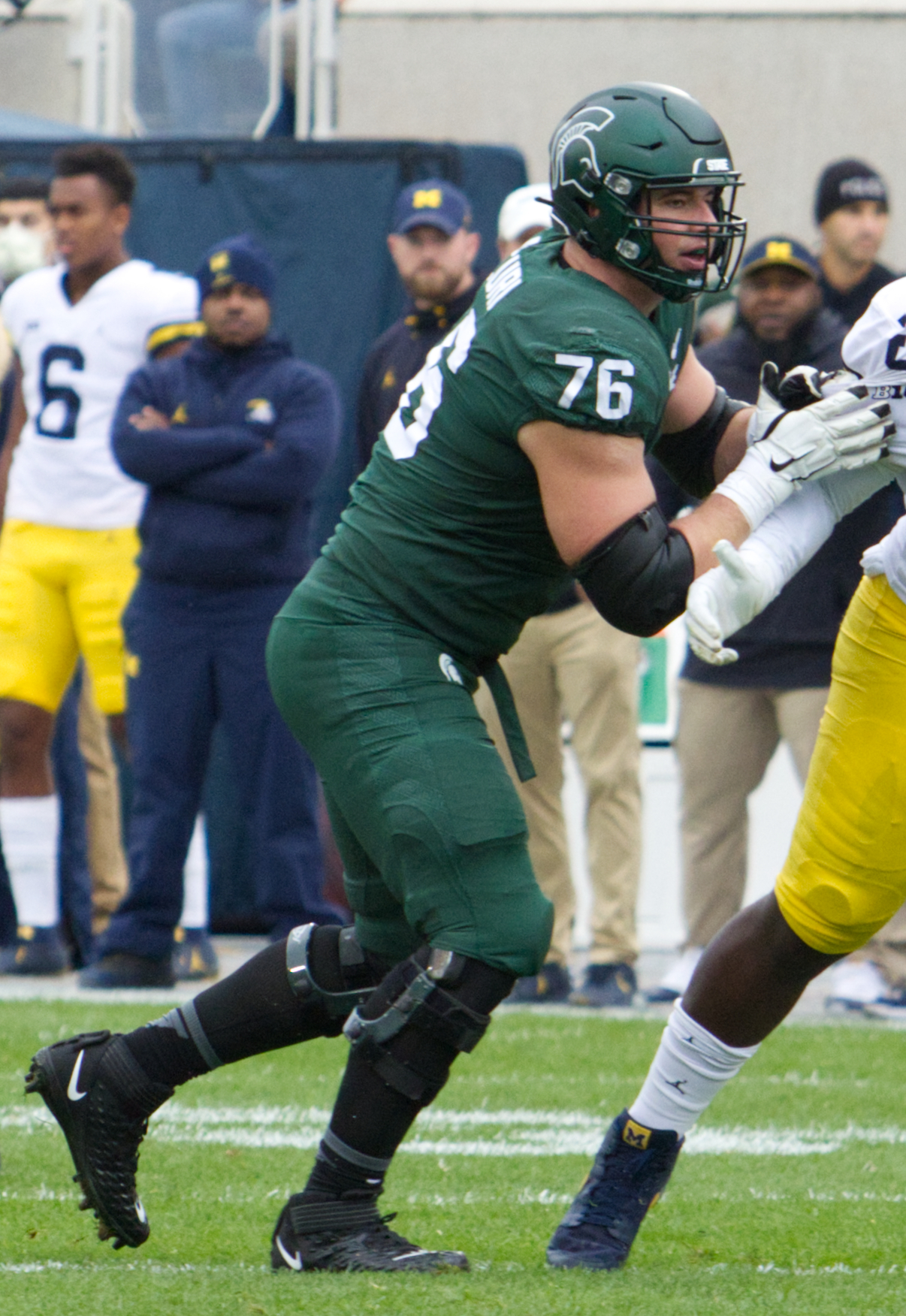
- Arcuri with the Michigan State Spartans in 2021

No. 68 – Baltimore Ravens
- Position: Offensive tackle
- Roster status: Practice squad

Personal information
- Born: August 13, 1997 (age 29); Powell, Ohio, U.S.
- Listed height: 6 ft 7 in (2.01 m)
- Listed weight: 312 lb (142 kg)

Career information
- High school: Olentangy Liberty (Powell)
- College: Michigan State (2016–2021)
- NFL draft: 2022: 7th round, 261st overall pick

Career history
- Los Angeles Rams (2022–2025); Baltimore Ravens (2026–present)*
- * Offseason or practice squad member only

Career NFL statistics as of 2025
- Games played: 10
- Games started: 1
- Stats at Pro Football Reference

A. J. Arcuri (born August 13, 1997) is an American professional football offensive tackle for the Baltimore Ravens of the National Football League (NFL). He played college football for the Michigan State Spartans and was selected by the Rams in the seventh round of the 2022 NFL draft.

== Professional career ==
Pre-draft measurables
Height	Weight	Arm length	Hand span	Wingspan	40-yard dash	10-yard split	20-yard split	20-yard shuttle	Three-cone drill	Vertical jump	Broad jump	Bench press
6 ft 7 1/8 in (2.01 m)	308 lb (140 kg)	33 7/8 in (0.86 m)	10 7/8 in (0.28 m)	6 ft 11 3/8 in (2.12 m)	5.48 s	1.89 s	3.07 s	4.75 s	7.75 s	33.5 in (0.85 m)	9 ft 0 in (2.74 m)	27 reps
All values from Pro Day

=== Los Angeles Rams ===
Arcuri was selected in the seventh round of the 2022 NFL draft by the Los Angeles Rams with the 261st overall pick, the second-to-last selection of the draft. He was waived on August 30, 2022, and signed to the practice squad the next day. Arcuri was promoted to the active roster on November 26. As a rookie, he appeared in eight games and started one in the 2022 season.

On August 29, 2023, Arcuri was waived by the Rams and re-signed to the practice squad. He signed a reserve/future contract with Los Angeles on January 15, 2024.

Arcuri was waived by the Rams on August 27, 2024, and re-signed to the practice squad. He signed a reserve/future contract with the Rams on January 20, 2025.

On August 26, 2025, Arcuri was waived by the Rams as part of final roster cuts and re-signed to the practice squad the next day. On January 27, 2026, he signed a reserve/futures contract with Los Angeles.

On August 30, 2026, Arcuri was waived by the Rams as a part of final roster cuts.

=== Baltimore Ravens ===
On September 2, 2026, Arcuri signed with the Baltimore Ravens' practice squad.
