= Village Academy =

Location
- 284 South Liberty Street; Powell, Ohio 43065; United States; 40°9′10″N 83°4′21″W

Information
- Other name: VA
- Type: Private, college-preparatory school
- Established: 1976
- Closed: July 19, 2019
- NCES School ID: A0108649
- Head of school: Tres Marangoni
- Teaching staff: 34.6 (on an FTE basis)
- Grades: PK–12
- Gender: Co-educational
- Enrollment: 294 (2015-2016)
- Student to teacher ratio: 7.6
- Colors: Maroon and White
- Mascot: Griffin
- Nickname: Griffins
- Accreditation: North Central Association of Colleges and Schools

Village Academy (VA) was a PK–12 private, co-educational, college-preparatory school in Powell, Ohio, United States. It was established in 1976 and closed on July 19, 2019, due to a decline in enrollment and withdrawal of contracts.

== History ==
Village Academy Schools was founded under the Learning Unlimited International Schools system in the fall of 1976 as a year-round preschool and kindergarten. The original campus was established directly across from to the Ohio State University. Over the next thirty years, the program expanded to become an independent preparatory school for students in pre-kindergarten through grade twelve. In 2006, the school was re-branded as Village Academy Schools, which consisted of Village Academy (Kindergarten-Grade 12) and the then-named Village Junior Academy (for pre-kindergarten and young kindergarten).

In the fall of 1990, the first phase of a 7-acre (28,000 m^{2}) campus, Village Academy, opened in Powell, Ohio. In 2011, the pre-kindergarten and young kindergarten programs re-joined the main campus, following the completion of the Griffin Hall building.

On July 16, 2019, its board of trustees announced the school would be closing on July 19, 2019, due to a decline in enrollment and withdrawal of contracts.

== Athletics ==
=== Ohio High School Athletic Association State Championships ===
- Boys Golf – 2013 (Jeg Coughlin III - Individual)
