= Joshua Perry =

American football player (born 1994)

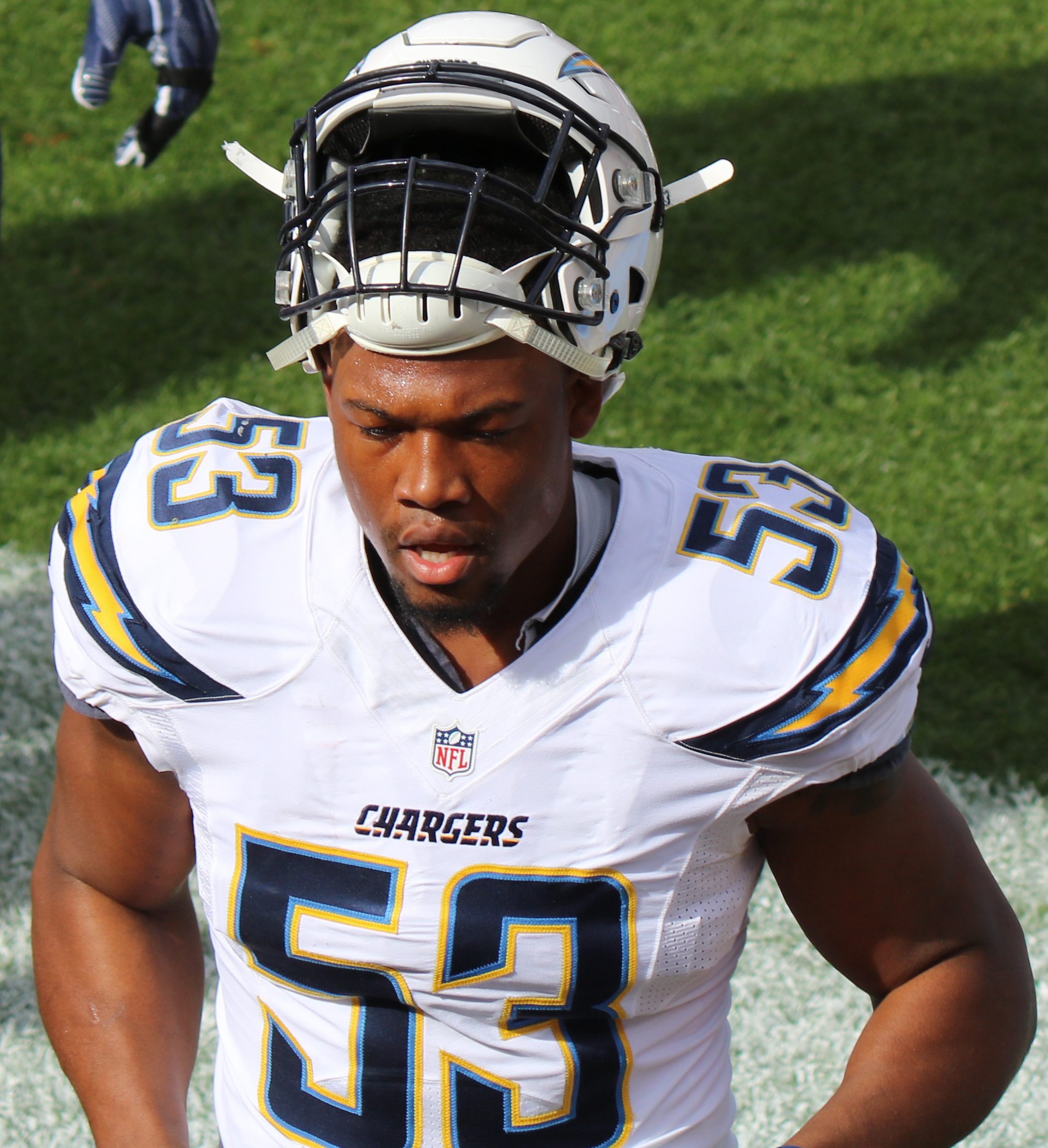
- Perry with the San Diego Chargers in 2016

No. 53, 49, 46
- Position: Linebacker

Personal information
- Born: April 26, 1994 (age 32); Franklin, Tennessee, U.S.
- Listed height: 6 ft 4 in (1.93 m)
- Listed weight: 253 lb (115 kg)

Career information
- High school: Olentangy (Lewis Center, Ohio)
- College: Ohio State
- NFL draft: 2016: 4th round, 102nd overall pick

Career history
- San Diego / Los Angeles Chargers (2016–2017); Indianapolis Colts (2017); Seattle Seahawks (2018)*
- * Offseason or practice squad member only

Awards and highlights
- CFP national champion (2015); First-team All-Big Ten (2015); Second-team All-Big Ten (2014)

Career NFL statistics
- Total tackles: 22
- Forced fumbles: 2
- Stats at Pro Football Reference

Joshua Perry (born April 26, 1994) is an American former professional football player who was a linebacker in the National Football League (NFL). He played college football for the Ohio State Buckeyes, where he was part of their 2014 national championship team.

== Early life ==
Perry attended Olentangy High School in Lewis Center, Ohio. He was rated by Rivals.com as a four-star recruit and was ranked among the top outside linebackers in his class. He committed to Ohio State University to play college football.

== College career ==
Perry played in 10 games as a true freshman at Ohio State in 2012 and had five tackles. As a sophomore in 2013, he played in all 13 games and made 10 starts. For the season, he had 64 tackles and one sack, which was a safety. As a junior, Perry played in all 15 games and started 14, leading the team in tackles with 124. He also had three sacks. During the 2015 College Football Playoff National Championship, he recorded six tackles.

== Professional career ==
=== Pre-draft ===
Coming out of Ohio State, Perry was projected by the majority of analysts to be a second to fourth round draft selection. He was rated the seventh best outside linebacker out of the 203 available by NFLDraftScout.com. Perry received positive reviews from scouts and analysts for his leadership, strength, productive tackling, conditioning, instincts, and anticipation. He was thought to be a limited playmaker who loses focus during blocks, with minimal man to man coverage skills, and below average sideline to sideline chase ability.

Pre-draft measurables
Height	Weight	Arm length	Hand span	40-yard dash	10-yard split	20-yard split	20-yard shuttle	Three-cone drill	Vertical jump	Broad jump	Bench press
6 ft 3 3/4 in (1.92 m)	254 lb (115 kg)	33 7/8 in (0.86 m)	10 1/4 in (0.26 m)	4.68 s	1.64 s	2.72 s	4.35 s	7.21 s	33 1/2 in (0.85 m)	10 ft 4 in (3.15 m)	20 reps
All values from NFL Combine/Ohio State's Pro Day

=== San Diego / Los Angeles Chargers ===
Perry was selected by the San Diego Chargers in the fourth round (102nd overall) in the 2016 NFL draft. On May 9, 2016, the Chargers signed Perry to a four-year, $2.95 million contract with a signing bonus of $614,084. Perry entered training camp competing with Nick Dzubnar to be the backup right inside linebacker. Perry was named the third right inside linebacker behind veteran Denzel Perryman and Dzubnar to begin the regular season.

Perry made his professional regular season debut in the Chargers' season opener against the Kansas City Chiefs. The following week, Perry made his first career solo tackle in a 38–14 victory over the Jacksonville Jaguars. On October 2, 2016, he recorded three solo tackles in the Chargers' 35–34 loss to the New Orleans Saints. On January 1, 2017, Perry received his first career start against the Kansas City Chiefs and recorded a season-high six combined tackles in a 37–27 loss. He finished his rookie season with a total of 22 combined tackles in 15 games and one start.

On September 2, 2017, Perry was waived/injured by the Chargers and placed on injured reserve. He was released on September 9, 2017.

=== Indianapolis Colts ===
On September 18, 2017, Perry was signed to the practice squad of the Indianapolis Colts. He was promoted to the active roster on October 27, 2017. He was waived by the Colts on November 14, 2017, and was re-signed to the practice squad the next day. He signed a reserve/future contract with the Colts on January 1, 2018. He was waived on May 11, 2018.

=== Seattle Seahawks ===
On June 11, 2018, Perry signed with Seattle Seahawks.

On July 30, 2018, Perry announced his retirement from the NFL due to concerns about concussions.

== Post-playing career ==
Perry has started working for "The Fan" 97.1 FM, a sports radio station in Columbus, Ohio, co-hosting "The NFL Hour" with Matt Hayes. He has also made appearances on the Big Ten Network.
