= Kenny Anunike =

American football player and coach (born 1990)

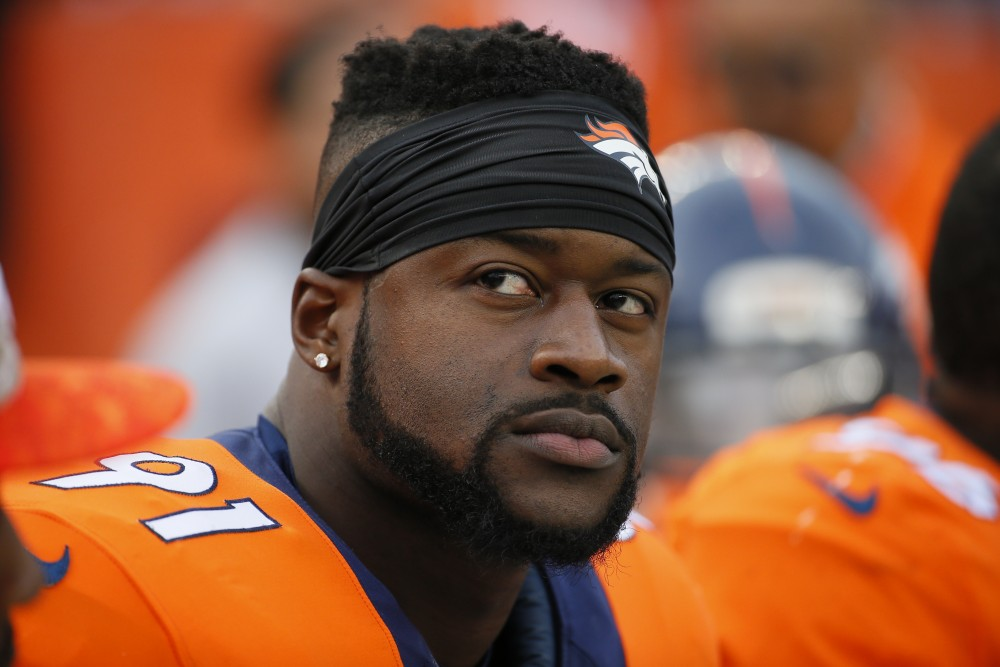
- Anunike with the Denver Broncos

Fordham Rams
- Title: Defensive run game coordinator & defensive line coach

Personal information
- Born: May 22, 1990 (age 36); Lewis Center, Ohio, U.S.
- Listed height: 6 ft 5 in (1.96 m)
- Listed weight: 276 lb (125 kg)

Career information
- High school: Olentangy (Lewis Center)
- College: Duke
- NFL draft: 2014: undrafted

Career history

Playing
- Denver Broncos (2014–2015); New York Jets (2016–2017)*
- * Offseason or practice squad member only

Coaching
- Ohio State (2017– 2019) Defensive Graduate Assistant; Fordham (2020–present) Defensive run game coordinator & defensive line coach

Awards and highlights
- Super Bowl champion (50)

Career NFL statistics
- Total tackles: 1
- Stats at Pro Football Reference

Kenny Chidozie Anunike (born May 22, 1990) is an American football coach and former player. He played professional as a defensive end for the Denver Broncos of the National Football League (NFL).

Anunike played college football for the Duke Blue Devils. After going undrafted Kenny spent two years with the Broncos with whom he won Super Bowl 50. In addition he spent a pre-season on the New York Jets roster. In 2017 Kenny began coaching as a graduate assistant coach at Ohio State University. Following three years as a graduate assistant, Kenny became the defensive line coach for the Fordham Rams.

== College career ==
During his four-year career at Duke, he totaled 148 tackles, 26 tackles for a loss, 4 forced fumbles, and 15 sacks. His best season came in 2013 when he totaled 67 tackles, 13.5 tackles for a loss, and 6 sacks. While at Duke, he was known as the "Night Train".

== Professional career ==
=== Denver Broncos ===
Anunike was signed as an undrafted free agent by the Broncos on May 12, 2014. He spent his rookie year in 2014 on injured reserve due to an elbow injury after competing with the Broncos during the preseason.

In 2015, Anunike played in three games. On February 7, 2016, Anunike was part of the Broncos team that won Super Bowl 50. In the game, the Broncos defeated the Carolina Panthers by a score of 24–10. Anunike did not play in the game because he was on injured reserve. He was waived by the Broncos on August 8, 2016.

=== New York Jets ===
On December 12, 2016, Anunike was signed to the Jets' practice squad. He signed a reserve/future contract with the Jets on January 2, 2017. On April 27, 2017, Anunike was waived by the Jets.

== Coaching career ==
=== Ohio State Buckeyes ===
Anunike joined the Ohio State coaching staff in early 2017 as a graduate assistant. He served as an assistant to defensive line coach Larry Johnson.

=== Fordham Rams ===
Kenny was named the Defensive Line Coach & Co- Defensive Coordinator at Fordham University in April 2020.
