= Jay Richardson (American football) =

American football player (born 1984)

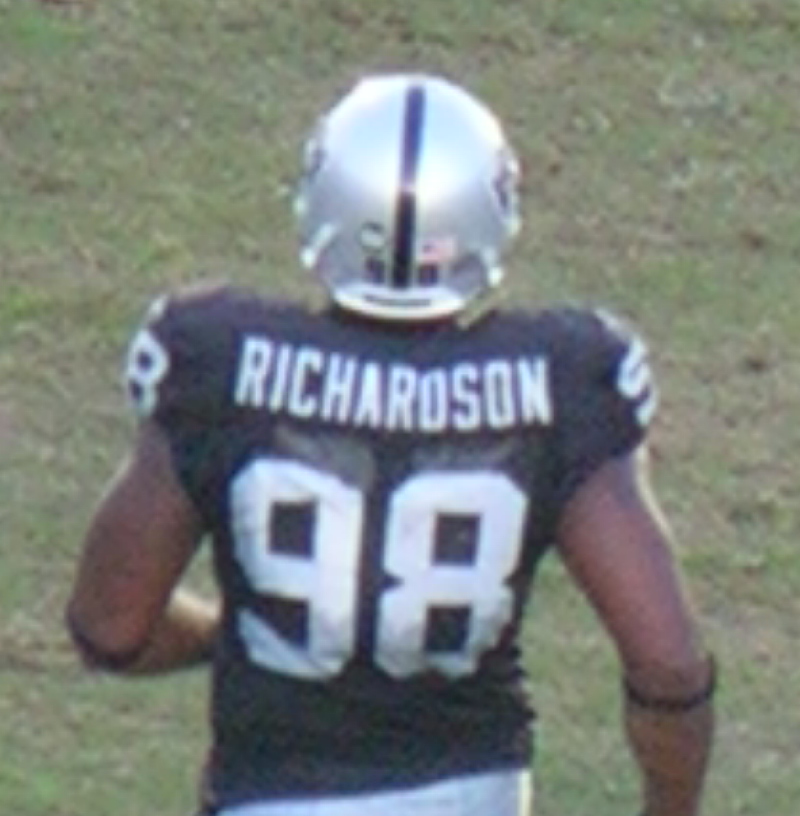
- Richardson with the Oakland Raiders in 2008

No. 98, 99, 56
- Position: Linebacker

Personal information
- Born: January 27, 1984 (age 42); Dublin, Ohio, U.S.
- Listed height: 6 ft 6 in (1.98 m)
- Listed weight: 280 lb (127 kg)

Career information
- High school: Dublin Scioto
- College: Ohio State
- NFL draft: 2007: 5th round, 138th overall pick

Career history
- Oakland Raiders (2007–2009); Seattle Seahawks (2010); New York Jets (2012)*; New Orleans Saints (2013)
- * Offseason or practice squad member only

Awards and highlights
- BCS national champion (2002)

Career NFL statistics
- Total tackles: 117
- Sacks: 7
- Pass deflections: 2
- Stats at Pro Football Reference

Jay Richardson (born January 27, 1984) is an American former professional football player who was a linebacker in the National Football League (NFL). He played college football for the Ohio State Buckeyes, where he majored in Communications. He was selected by the Oakland Raiders in the fifth round of the 2007 NFL draft and played for the team for three seasons. He was also a member of the Seattle Seahawks, New York Jets, and New Orleans Saints.

== Early life ==
He played high school football for Dublin Scioto High School in Dublin, Ohio.

== Professional career ==
Pre-draft measurables
| Height | Weight | Arm length | Hand span | 40-yard dash | 10-yard split | 20-yard split | 20-yard shuttle | Three-cone drill | Vertical jump | Broad jump | Bench press |
|---|---|---|---|---|---|---|---|---|---|---|---|
| 6 ft 5 5/8 in (1.97 m) | 279 lb (127 kg) | 34 1/8 in (0.87 m) | 9 7/8 in (0.25 m) | 4.90 s | 1.69 s | 2.84 s | 4.54 s | 7.26 s | 33.0 in (0.84 m) | 9 ft 4 in (2.84 m) | 20 reps |
All values from NFL Combine/Pro Day

=== Oakland Raiders ===
Richardson was selected by the Oakland Raiders in the fifth round of the 2007 NFL draft (138th overall) and played for the team for three seasons.

=== Seattle Seahawks ===
Richardson was placed on injured reserve before the start of the 2010 NFL season. He became an unrestricted free agent following the season.

=== New York Jets ===
Richardson was signed by the New York Jets on April 16, 2012. Richardson was waived on August 31, 2012.

=== New Orleans Saints ===
Richardson had a strong performance during the Saints 2013 training camp but he was cut from the roster at the end of the preseason. After the Saints sustained several defensive injuries in their first regular season game, Richardson was brought back to the team on September 12, 2013. The Saints released him again on October 8, 2013, to make room for defensive end Keyunta Dawson.
