= Big Walnut High School =

Location
- 713 N. Miller Drive; Sunbury, Delaware County, Ohio, Ohio 43074; United States; 40.2613°N 82.8712°W

Information
- Type: Public, high school
- Established: 1950
- School district: Big Walnut Local School District
- Principal: Nicole Carter
- Teaching staff: 60.40 (on an FTE basis)
- Grades: 9-12
- Enrollment: 1,320 (2023-2024)
- Student to teacher ratio: 21.85
- Campus: Suburban
- Colors: Scarlet and Goldenrod
- Athletics conference: Ohio Capital Conference
- Nickname: Golden Eagles
- Publication: Eagle Eye News
- Website: www.bwls.net/bigwalnuthighschool_home.aspx

Big Walnut High School is a public high school located in Sunbury, Ohio. It is the only high school in the Big Walnut School District. The first Big Walnut High School to open was in August 1951 at 105 Baughman Street. The current building was opened in January 2022 to meet the demands of the growing district and has a student population of approximately 1300 students. The school's mascot is the Golden Eagle.

== History ==
Big Walnut Local School District was formed by a legislative action of the Delaware County Board of Education in January 1950. The previous rivals of Galena and Sunbury School districts were abolished and the new district was formed. It was named for the Big Walnut Creek which flows through both towns.

Prior to consolidation, the Sunbury District had purchased 56 acres of land south of Sunbury and north of Galena in preparation for building a new high school. Galena had likewise passed a levy to build but had not purchased the land. The merged district needed the new school so it was decided to build on the land formerly owned by Sunbury School. Since then, the land has been annexed into the village for water and sewer.

October 27, 1950, A.D. St. Clair of the State Department of Education broke ground for the high school at 105 Baughman Street on 56 acres of land purchased prior to consolidation, Big Walnut High School opened in 1951. It housed 8th through high school students for a year.

The first one story building in the Big Walnut Local School District was very modern with the best gym in the county. The school had science labs, shop labs, as well as vocational agriculture and home economic rooms.

On September 17, 1991, the new Big Walnut High School opened at 555 South Old 3-C Highway on part of the original 50 acres Sunbury School had owned. Located south of the former Big Walnut High School which now became a Junior High School, this building sat where a former ecology center had been. One addition was added in 2006, but ultimately the tenants outgrew the facility, moving into the current building in January 2022.

== Athletics ==
The Big Walnut Golden Eagles compete in the Ohio Capital Conference. The official school colors are scarlet and Goldenrod, however, Red and Gold are typically used and accepted. As of the 2022-2023 school year, the following Ohio High School Athletic Association (OHSAA) sanctioned sports were offered;

Baseball

Basketball (Boys/Girls)

Bowling (Boys/Girls)

Cross Country (Boys/Girls)

Football (Boys)

Golf (Boys/Girls)

Gymnastics (Girls)

Lacrosse (Boys/Girls)

SCUBA Diving (Boys/Girls)

Soccer (Boys/Girls)

Softball

Swimming & Diving (Boys/Girls)

Tennis (Boys/Girls)

Volleyball (Boys/Girls)

Wrestling (Boys/Girls)

=== State championships ===
- Football - 2007
- Boys' golf - 2002
- Boys track and field - 2026

== Notable alumni ==
- Adam Shaheen - National Football League (NFL) tight end
- Dave Yost - Ohio Attorney General
