= Zac Kerin =

American football player (born 1991)

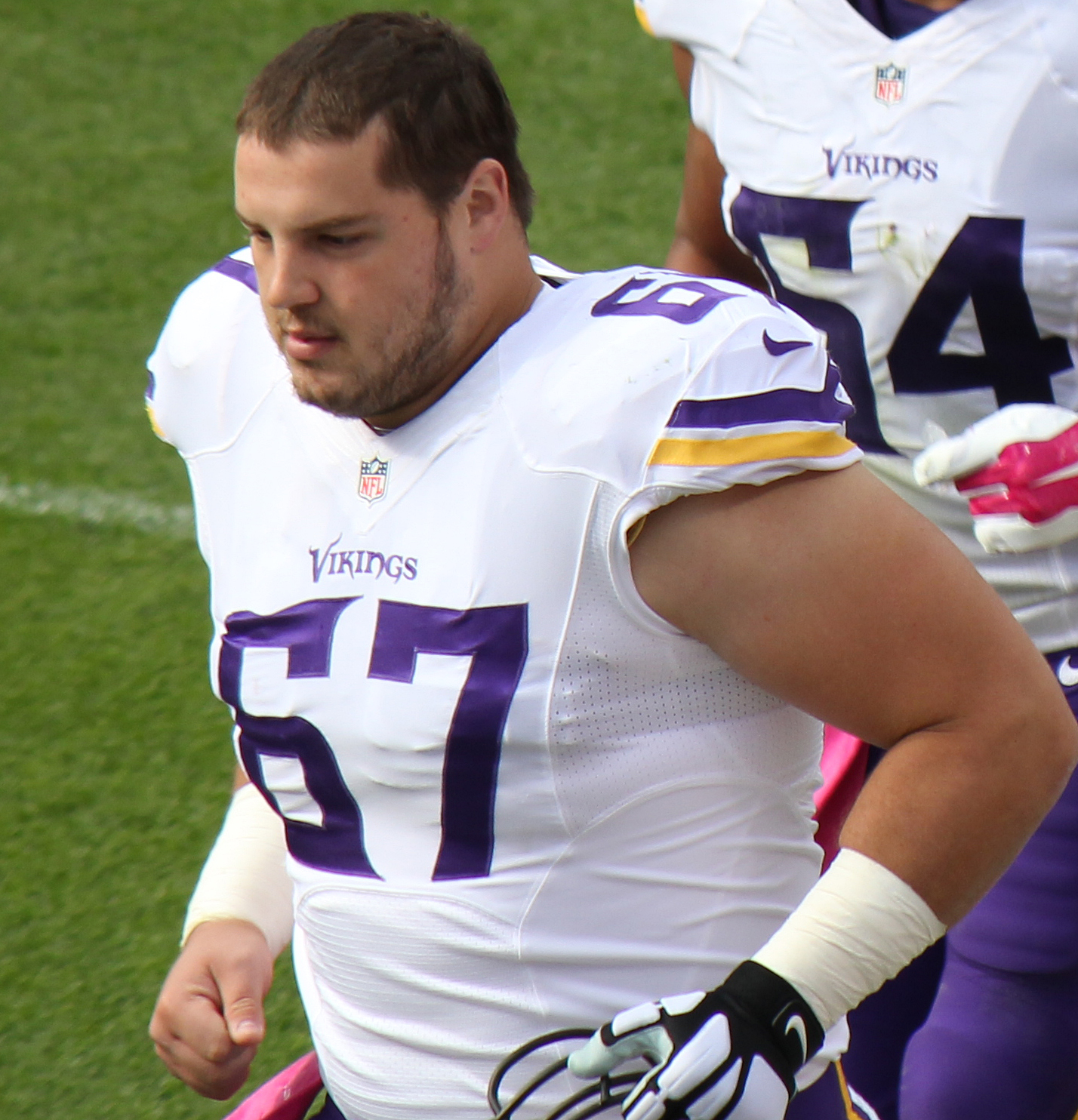
- Kerin with the Minnesota Vikings in 2015

No. 67
- Position: Guard

Personal information
- Born: August 13, 1991 (age 35); Delaware, Ohio, U.S.
- Listed height: 6 ft 5 in (1.96 m)
- Listed weight: 305 lb (138 kg)

Career information
- High school: Olentangy (Lewis Center, Ohio)
- College: Toledo
- NFL draft: 2014: undrafted

Career history
- Minnesota Vikings (2014–2016); Detroit Lions (2017); New York Giants (2018)*; Atlanta Falcons (2018); Washington Redskins (2018); New York Guardians (2020); Tennessee Titans (2020)*
- * Offseason or practice squad member only

Awards and highlights
- 2× First-team All-MAC (2011, 2012); Second-team All-MAC (2013)

Career NFL statistics
- Games played: 16
- Games started: 2
- Stats at Pro Football Reference

Zachary Todd Kerin (born August 13, 1991) is an American former professional football player who was a guard in the National Football League (NFL). He played college football for the Toledo Rockets. He was signed by the Minnesota Vikings as an undrafted free agent in 2014.

== Early life ==
Kerin attended Olentangy High School in Lewis Center, Ohio, where he was a first-team All-district and special mention All-state offensive lineman as a senior. On defense, he collected 55 tackles, five sacks, two forced fumbles and two fumble recoveries. He was selected to play in the North-South All-Star Game. He committed to play college football for the Toledo Rockets on February 4, 2009.

== College career ==
Kerin played college football at the University of Toledo from 2009 to 2013, where he was selected to the All-MAC team three consecutive seasons in 2011 (1st team), 2012 (1st team) and 2013 (2nd team). He appeared in 50 career games for the Rockets, earning 38 career starts while not missing a single game over the final three years of his collegiate career. In 2013, he was a key part of the offense that ranked third in the MAC for total offense and fifth in scoring, anchoring an offensive line that only allowed five sacks during the 2013 campaign, which ranked first nationally.

== Professional career ==
Pre-draft measurables
Height	Weight	40-yard dash	10-yard split	20-yard split	20-yard shuttle	Three-cone drill	Vertical jump	Broad jump	Bench press
6 ft 4 in (1.93 m)	310 lb (141 kg)	5.30 s	1.72 s	3.12 s	4.82 s	7.55 s	25.5 in (0.65 m)	8 ft 7 in (2.62 m)	30 reps
All values from Pro Day

=== Minnesota Vikings ===
Kerin was signed by the Minnesota Vikings as a rookie free agent following going undrafted in the 2014 NFL draft.

In a Week 5 game against the Houston Texans on October 9, 2016, Kerin replaced Brandon Fusco at right guard after Fusco was knocked out of the game on the first series with a concussion. In Week 14, Kerin replaced Fusco again midway through the fourth quarter.

On September 2, 2017, Kerin was waived by the Vikings.

=== Detroit Lions ===
On September 3, 2017, Kerin was claimed off waivers by the Detroit Lions. He was placed on injured reserve on September 30, 2017, with a knee injury.

=== New York Giants ===
On July 12, 2018, Kerin signed with the New York Giants. He was released on September 1, 2018.

=== Atlanta Falcons ===
On September 18, 2018, Kerin signed with the Atlanta Falcons. He was released on October 23, 2018.

=== Washington Redskins ===
On December 4, 2018, Kerin signed with the Washington Redskins. He re-signed with the Redskins on March 18, 2019. He was waived on August 31, 2019.

=== New York Guardians ===
Kerin was selected in the 5th round in phase two in the 2020 XFL draft by the New York Guardians. He was placed on injured reserve during mini-camp in December 2019. He had his contract terminated when the league suspended operations on April 10, 2020.

=== Tennessee Titans ===
On April 29, 2020, Kerin was signed by the Tennessee Titans. He was released on July 26, 2020, and re-signed eight days later. He was released on September 5, 2020.
