= Olentangy Berlin High School =

Location
- 3140 Berlin Station Road; Delaware, Ohio 43015; United States; 40°15′15″N 83°0′18″W

Information
- Founded: 2018
- School district: Olentangy Local School District
- Superintendent: Todd Meyer
- Principal: Benjamin Jagger
- Teaching staff: 73.84 (FTE)
- Grades: 9-12
- Enrollment: 1,969 (2025–2026)
- Student to teacher ratio: 23.56
- Campus type: Suburban
- Colors: Blue and Light Blue (Double Blue)
- Fight song: "Berlin War Song" 'Olentangy Berlin Alma Mater'
- Athletics conference: Ohio Capital Conference
- Mascot: Obie
- Team name: Bears
- Newspaper: The Bulletin
- Yearbook: The River
- Feeder schools: Berkshire Middle School, Hyatts Middle School, Berlin Middle School
- Website: obhs.olentangy.k12.oh.us

Olentangy Berlin High School is the fourth, and newest, high school in the Olentangy Local School District. It opened on August 5, 2018, starting with the first classes on August 15, 2018, in time for the 2018–2019 school year.

== History ==
Near the building site of Olentangy Berlin High School, there was another school named Berlin Township School, which was operational from 1915 to 1973. The new school takes its name from the old facility. In 2016, a levy was passed to get the funds to build the new school. The new school will provide more space for students as the district grows.

In 2022, Olentangy Berlin was named the "Most Spirited High School in America" by Varsity Brands, and was awarded a check of $25,000 during a pep-rally on August 19. The school maintains mottos such as "Claws Up" and "Berlin Pride".

== See also ==
- Olentangy High School
- Olentangy Liberty High School
- Olentangy Orange High School
