= Dublin Coffman High School =

Location
- 6780 Coffman Road; Dublin, Ohio 43017; United States; 40°6′27″N 83°7′51″W

Information
- School type: Public, high school
- Established: 1892; 134 years ago
- School district: Dublin City Schools
- Superintendent: John Marschhausen
- Principal: Matthew Parrill
- Teaching staff: 102.79 (FTE)
- Grades: 9–12 (K–12 for those living in the walk zone)
- Gender: Co-educational
- Enrollment: 1,824 (2024–2025)
- Student to teacher ratio: 17.74
- Colors: Green, Black and White
- Athletics conference: Ohio Capital Conference
- Team name: Shamrocks
- Accreditation: North Central Association of Colleges and Schools
- Website: dublinschools.net/coffman

Dublin Coffman High School is a public high school located in Dublin, Ohio, United States, a suburb northwest of Columbus, Ohio. The school was formerly known as Dublin High School. It is the oldest of three high schools in the Dublin City School District, and serves the southern and central parts of the district.

== History ==
Dublin Coffman High School was originally established as Dublin High School in January 1973, and was the only high school in the Dublin school district at that time. Dublin High School changed its name to Dublin Coffman High School in 1995 after the school's acceptance into the Ohio Capital Conference and plans to build a second high school—eventually named Dublin Scioto—were announced.

Over its almost forty-year history, Coffman has gone through many additions and upgrades; the most major include the expansion of the B building, which now houses the English, World Languages, and Social Studies departments, and the addition of the A building, which encompasses the library, technology- related classes, Mathematics, and Science departments.

In the 2009–2010 school year, Dublin Coffman underwent a series of renovations to the building. These renovations made it possible to add 10 classrooms, seal the outdoor courtyard, add classrooms off of and below the bridge between the A and B buildings, and move the location of the administrative offices and main entrance to the opposite side of the building . In addition to this, the renovations converted the old administrative area to new classrooms. The Rock Shop was moved from its original location to the cafeteria, near the girl's restrooms.

Dublin Coffman High School is a part of the Dublin City School District in central Ohio. The Dublin City School District has been awarded Ohio's highest academic rating, Excellent with Distinction, for its eighth consecutive year. Their mascot is the Shamrocks, also known as the Rocks.

== Attendance boundary ==
The school's boundary includes, in addition to portions of Dublin, portions of Columbus and Upper Arlington.

== Notable alumni ==
Notable alumni include:

- Mike Adams (class of 2008), former offensive tackle for the Chicago Bears
- Jeremy Bobb, actor
- Doug DeVore, former MLB player, Arizona Diamondbacks
- Emeka Eneli (class of 2018), MLS soccer player
- Kent Mercker (class of 1986), former MLB pitcher for 9 different teams but, most known for his career with the Cincinnati Reds
- Chinedum Ndukwe (class of 2003), former NFL safety that played for Cincinnati Bengals and Oakland Raiders
- Ikechuku Ndukwe (class of 2000), former offensive guard/tackle for the Baltimore Ravens, Miami Dolphins, Kansas City Chiefs and Northwestern University Wildcats
- Brady Quinn (class of 2003), current FOX college football analyst, former Miami Dolphins, Cleveland Browns, Denver Broncos, Kansas City Chiefs, Seattle Seahawks, New York Jets, and Notre Dame quarterback
- Chris Quinn (class of 2002), former Cleveland Cavaliers guard
- Mitch Rowland, Grammy Award-winning songwriter and lead guitarist in Harry Styles' band
- Jacy Sheldon (class of 2019), former Ohio State Women's Basketball player, 5th overall draft pick in 2024 WNBA Draft, guard for Dallas Wings
- Abby Steiner (class of 2018), US Track and Field and NCAA champion 200m sprinter
- Jake Stoneburner (class of 2008), former tight end for the Miami Dolphins
- Vince Workman (class of 1985), former NFL running back

== Athletics ==
=== State championships ===
- Boys Baseball – 2001
- Girls Soccer – 2001, 2003
- Boys Cross Country – 2011
- Boys Lacrosse – 2019
- Girls Swimming – 2020
- Girls Lacrosse – 2021
- Boys Golf - 1977, 1979, 1981, 1983
- Girls Gymnastics - 1980, 1982, 1984
- Girls Golf - 2000
