= Watkins Memorial High School =

Location
- 1954 Warrior Way; Etna, Ohio 43018; United States; 39°57′31.6″N 82°39′53.3″W

Information
- Type: Public, coeducational
- Status: Active
- School district: Southwest Licking Local School District
- Principal: Melissa Ladowitz
- Teaching staff: 63.02 (FTE)
- Grades: 9–12
- Enrollment: 1,397 (2024-25)
- Average class size: 25
- Student to teacher ratio: 22.16
- Colors: Black and gold
- Fight song: Across the Field
- Athletics conference: Licking County League
- Team name: Warriors
- Rival: Licking Heights High School
- Feeder schools: Watkins Middle School
- Website: Watkins Memorial High School

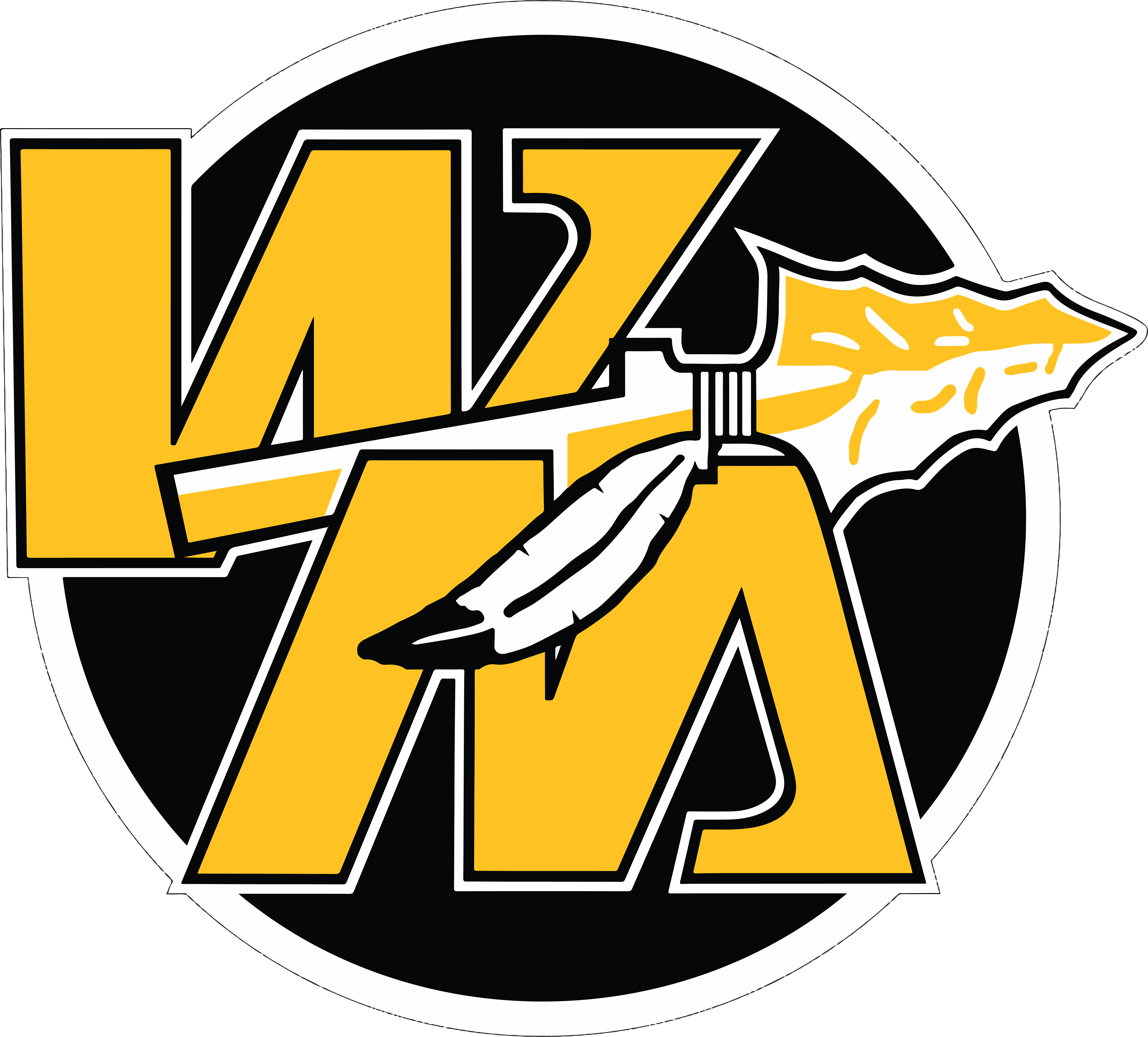

Watkins Memorial High School is a public high school located in Etna Township, southeast of Pataskala, Ohio, United States. It is the only high school in the Southwest Licking Local School District, which was formed in 1950 by the merger of the Etna Township, Kirkersville, and Pataskala one room K-12 buildings. Athletic teams are known as the Warriors and school colors are black and gold.

The school was named in memory of Dr. Watkins, who served the community for years. The school's biggest sports rival is Licking Heights High School. The yearly football game between the Watkins Warriors and the Licking Heights Hornets is referred to as "The Battle for Broad Street". Broad street, or State Route 16, runs through Pataskala, and whichever team wins this game has a small dead-end road next to the Town Hall named in their honor, either Warrior Way or Hornet Way, for the year until the next Watkins/Heights game. Watkins Middle School is located next to the high school.

The students that attend Watkins Memorial High School live in the city of Pataskala and the following townships: Kirkersville Township, Etna Township, and Harrison Township, all of which are in the second largest county in Ohio's 12th Congressional District, Licking County.

== State championships ==
- Boys Soccer – 2004
- Baseball - 1936 (Won by Etna High School Eagles before consoliding with Pataskala and Kirkersville to form Watkins Memorial)

=== Other Non-Sanctioned Championships ===
- Boys rugby 2021, 2022 & 2024
