= Olentangy Liberty High School =

Public high school in Powell, Ohio, United States

Location
- 3584 Home Road; Powell, Ohio, (Delaware County) 43065; United States
- 40°11′53″N 83°5′56″W

Information
- Type: Public high school
- Opened: August 24th, 2003
- School district: Olentangy Local School District
- Principal: Michael Starner
- Teaching staff: 92.16 (FTE)
- Grades: 9-12
- Enrollment: 1,837 (2023–2024)
- Student to teacher ratio: 19.93
- Campus size: 116 acres (47 ha)
- Campus type: Suburban
- Colors: Blue and silver
- Fight song: Silver and Blue
- Athletics conference: Ohio Capital Conference
- Mascot: Papa Patriot
- Team name: Patriots
- Newspaper: The Cannon
- Yearbook: The Silver Bullet
- Feeder schools: Olentangy Liberty Middle School; Olentangy Hyatts Middle School
- Website: olhs.olentangy.k12.oh.us
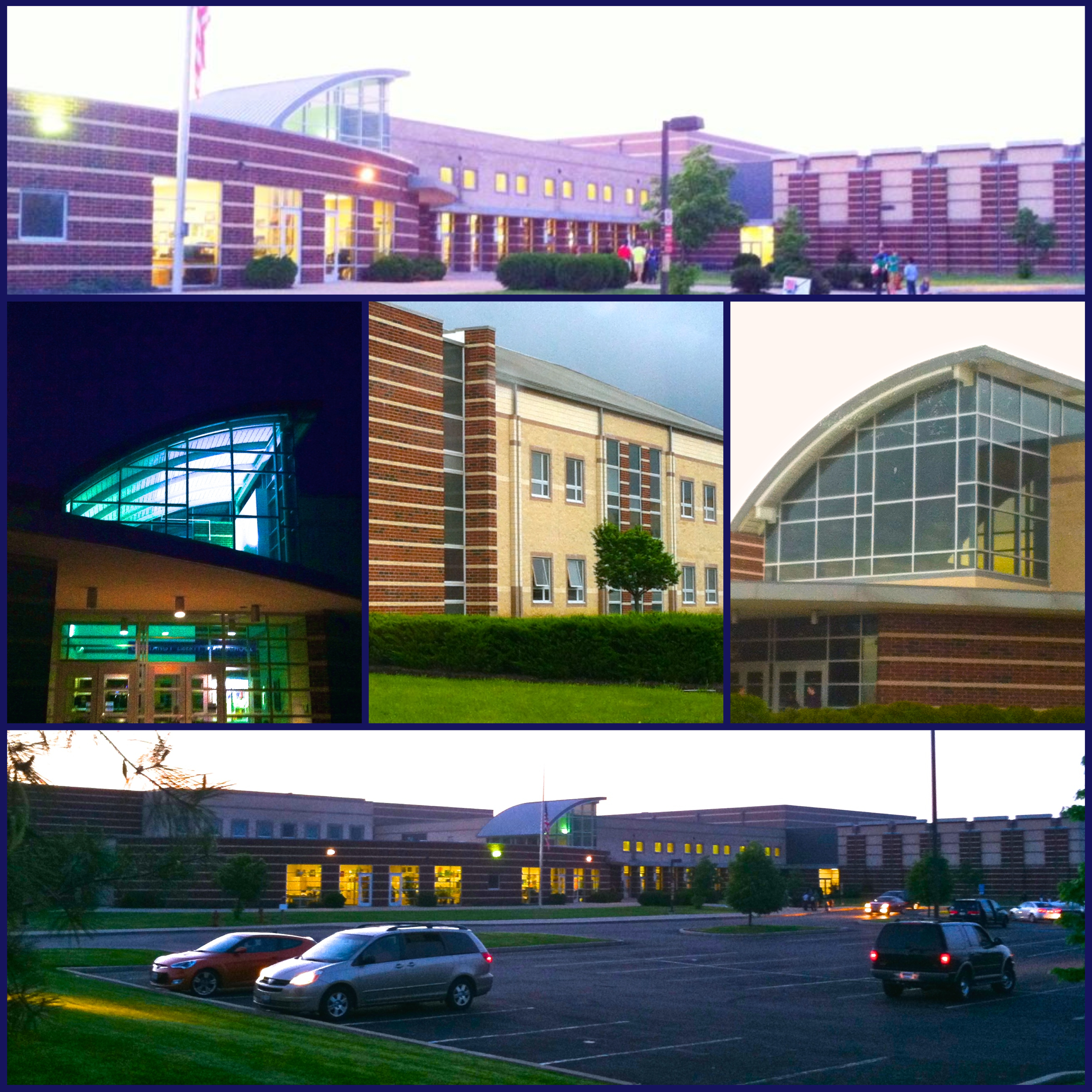

Olentangy Liberty High School is a public comprehensive high school located in Powell, Ohio. The school was established in 2003 and is the second of four high schools in the Olentangy Local School District. Olentangy Liberty was rated "Excellent" on the 2013/2014 State of Ohio report card. In 2013, the school received a gold medal ranking as the fifth best high school in the state of Ohio and the 175th best high school in the U.S. by U.S. News & World Report. In 2014, the school was ranked as one of America's most challenging high schools by The Washington Post.

== Athletics ==
Sports offered at Liberty include:

- Baseball (boys)
- Basketball (boys & girls)
- Bowling (boys & girls)
- Cheerleading (boys & girls)
- Cross-country (boys & girls)
- Softball (girls)
- Field hockey (girls)
- Football (boys)
- Golf (boys & girls)
- Gymnastics (girls)
- Ice Hockey (boys)
- Lacrosse (boys & girls)
- Soccer (boys & girls)
- Swimming & diving (boys & girls)
- Tennis (boys & girls)
- Track & field (boys & girls)
- Volleyball (boys & girls)
- Wrestling (boys & girls)
- Dance Team (girls)

=== State championships ===
- Football – 2024
- Boys' soccer – 2012
- Baseball – 2018
- Boys' ice hockey – 2023
- Girls' lacrosse – 2024, 2025, 2026
- Boys' lacrosse – 2024

== Notable alumni ==
- AJ Arcuri - NFL offensive tackle
- Seth Lucas - Racing driver
- Carter Smith – College football offensive tackle for the Indiana Hoosiers

== See also ==
- Olentangy High School
- Olentangy Orange High School
- Olentangy Berlin High School
