= Powell, Ohio =

- City
- Flag Logo

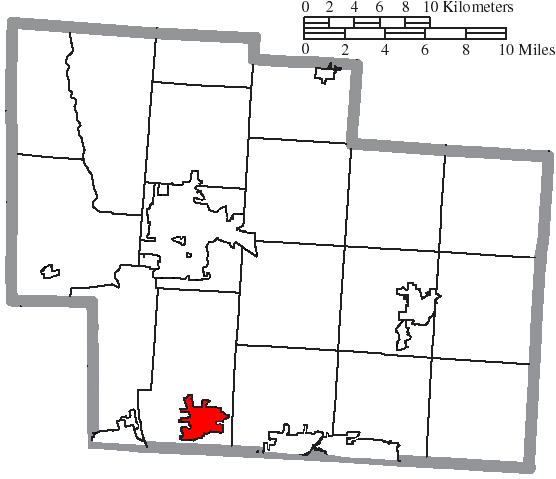
- Location of Powell in Delaware County

- Location within Ohio Location within the United States
- Coordinates: 40°10′09″N 83°04′58″W
- Country: United States
- State: Ohio
- County: Delaware
- Township: Liberty
- Founded: 1801
- Incorporated: 1947

Government
  - Mayor: Heather Karr

Area
  - Total: 5.82 sq mi (15.07 km^{2})
  - Land: 5.81 sq mi (15.06 km^{2})
  - Water: 0.0039 sq mi (0.01 km^{2})
- Elevation: 935 ft (285 m)

Population (2020)
  - Total: 14,163
  - Density: 2,435.5/sq mi (940.35/km^{2})
- Time zone: UTC-5 (Eastern (EST))
  - Summer (DST): UTC-4 (EDT)
- ZIP code: 43065
- Area codes: 614, 740
- FIPS code: 39-64486
- GNIS feature ID: 2396264
- Website: www.cityofpowell.us

Powell is a city in Delaware County, Ohio, United States, located 14 miles (21.5 km) north of the state capital of Columbus. Powell had an estimated population of 14,163 at the 2020 census. Founded in the early 1800s, it is now a suburb of Columbus.

== History ==
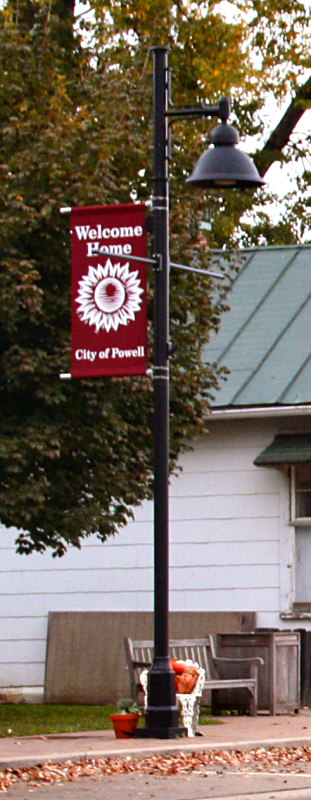
Powell street in fall

=== Early history ===
Present-day Powell is located on land that was once a vast wilderness sparsely populated by Native Americans including the Huron, Wyandot, Miami, Delaware, Ottawa, Shawnee, Mingo, and Erie people. The region was surveyed by French Canadian and European explorers beginning in the 17th century; with Great Britain, France, and the Iroquois League claiming ownership of the land during periods of the 1600s and 1700s. By the 18th century, the land became part of that what is historically known as Ohio Country. During the American Revolution, the states of Connecticut, New York, Pennsylvania, and Virginia claimed portions of the land during western expansion of the United States. The Land Ordinance of 1785 opened up the region to settlement by American pioneers, including veterans of the American Revolutionary War who had received bounty land warrants as compensation for their services. In 1787, the region was established as the Northwest Territory.

=== Settlement and growth ===
The first settlers arrived in present-day Powell on May 1, 1801. At the time, the land was deeded to Thomas R. Hall. By 1813, records indicate that the settlement became known as "Middlebury", in possible reference to early settlers having come from Middlebury, Connecticut. Today, Powell maintains references to its heritage as Middlebury with multiple streets and housing developments applying the name.

The population of Middlebury remained small, with historical records suggesting that settlers held trades and occupations consistent with other small towns of time period. The settlement included farmers, milliners, buggy makers, and blacksmiths. In 1839, deed owner Thomas R. Hall purchased additional nearby land, and later opened a general store. Middlebury was renamed for him in 1850, becoming "Hall's Corner". According to historical records, a variant of this new name has been recorded as "Hall Corners". In 1857, Hall's Corner applied for an official post office, which required the approval of a judge. The village was renamed Powell in honor of the judge who approved the request.

The Columbus and Toledo Railroad (C&T) arrived in Powell in 1872, which provided new opportunities for settlers. The primary purpose of the railroad was to transport coal from Appalachia to regions beyond Columbus. After merging with two other railroads in 1899, C&T became part of the Hocking Valley Railway. As of 2021, much of the line still operates as the Columbus Subdivision freight line, owned by CSX Transportation.

Powell was incorporated as a municipality in 1947, and was later known as the Village of Powell. The population remained small until the late 1980s, when residential development expanding from the northern Columbus metropolitan area reached Powell. In 20 years, the population grew almost 1,500%, from 378 to over 6,000. In 2000, Powell officially became a city.

Between the years 2000 and 2010, Powell's population nearly doubled again, largely due to the 2002 annexation of approximately 1,000 acres (4.0 km^{2}) along the Sawmill Parkway extension north of Seldom Seen Road for the development of the Golf Village community.

=== Liberty Township Separation Movement of 1995 ===
On February 21, 1995, Powell Village Council members voted 5-1 in favor of an ordinance requesting Delaware County Commissioners withdraw the Village of Powell from Liberty Township. The decision was made without soliciting a community vote, which prompted residents to mount a referendum drive in hope of placing the separation issue on the November ballot. The separation of Powell from Liberty Township would have left the Village without fire department services, and would have impacted master planning efforts of the community. Proponents of the separation insisted that Liberty Township was too dependent on inside millage; the approximately $95,000 yearly that Powell residents were paying into Liberty Township's general fund.

Powell Village residents needed 74 signatures to place the issue on the November ballot. A group of residents from The Chase and The Retreat subdivisions collected 179 signatures and submitted them to village clerk Doris Moore, on March 8, 1995. However, the Village Council refused the petition, citing a technicality with Ohio Revised Code section 731.32. Dan Boyle, organizer of the referendum movement and then president of The Chase Homeowner's Association, insisted that the petition had been properly executed according to local charter section 6.10, entitled "Initiative and Referendum Petition Procedures."

Following the Council's decision to refuse the petition, Powell resident and attorney Lawrence Walker urged Delaware County Prosecutor W. Duncan Whitney and Powell Mayor Jane VanFossen to take action. Mayor VanFossen ultimately decided that the Clerk of Council failed to perform her obligation of processing the petition, an action that therefore voided the separation legislation of the Council; Ordinance No. 93-54. Due to significant public interest generated in the wake of the petition, Powell's Village Council agreed to place the issue on the ballot of the August 8 special election. Of the 384 residents in Powell that voted on the separation, 98 (26%) voted for the separation, and 286 (74%) voted against the separation. Powell was subsequently not removed from the Township, and an amicable relationship between the City of Powell and Liberty Township has continued ever since.

== Geography ==
The city sits between the Scioto and Olentangy Rivers, about 14 miles (21.5 km) north of the state capital of Columbus, centered on the intersection of State Route 750 and C.R.9; known as Liberty Street within the City of Powell. This intersection is commonly referred to by residents as the Four Corners. It sits within Liberty Township, the site of the first settlement in Delaware County, Ohio. According to the United States Census Bureau, the city has a total area of 4.93 square miles (12.77 km^{2}), all land.

== Demographics ==
Historical population
Census	Pop.	Note	%±
1880	131		—
1950	384		—
1960	390		1.6%
1970	374		−4.1%
1980	387		3.5%
1990	2,154		456.6%
2000	6,247		190.0%
2010	11,500		84.1%
2020	14,163		23.2%

=== 2020 census ===
As of the 2020 census, Powell had a population of 14,163. The median age was 40.2 years. 30.2% of residents were under the age of 18 and 13.4% of residents were 65 years of age or older. For every 100 females there were 95.4 males, and for every 100 females age 18 and over there were 92.6 males.

100.0% of residents lived in urban areas, while 0.0% lived in rural areas.

There were 4,744 households in Powell, of which 47.7% had children under the age of 18 living in them. Of all households, 74.6% were married-couple households, 6.9% were households with a male householder and no spouse or partner present, and 15.6% were households with a female householder and no spouse or partner present. About 14.2% of all households were made up of individuals and 7.6% had someone living alone who was 65 years of age or older.

There were 4,965 housing units, of which 4.5% were vacant. The homeowner vacancy rate was 0.6% and the rental vacancy rate was 13.2%.

Racial composition as of the 2020 census
Race	Number	Percent
White	11,464	80.9%
Black or African American	219	1.5%
American Indian and Alaska Native	19	0.1%
Asian	1,719	12.1%
Native Hawaiian and Other Pacific Islander	4	0.0%
Some other race	89	0.6%
Two or more races	649	4.6%
Hispanic or Latino (of any race)	357	2.5%

=== 2010 census ===
As of the census of 2010, there were 11,500 people, 3,796 households, and 3,227 families residing in the city. The population density was 2,332.7 inhabitants per square mile (900.7/km^{2}). There were 3,975 housing units at an average density of 806.3 per square mile (311.3/km^{2}). The racial makeup of the city was 88.5% White, 1.9% African American, 0.1% Native American, 7.5% Asian, 0.3% from other races, and 1.7% from two or more races. Hispanic or Latino of any race were 1.4% of the population.

There were 3,796 households, of which 53.5% had children under the age of 18 living with them, 77.8% were married couples living together, 5.4% had a female householder with no husband present, 1.8% had a male householder with no wife present, and 15.0% were non-families. 12.6% of all households were made up of individuals, and 4.5% had someone living alone who was 65 years of age or older. The average household size was 3.03 and the average family size was 3.33.

The median age in the city was 37.4 years. 34.7% of residents were under the age of 18; 3.4% were between the ages of 18 and 24; 28.1% were from 25 to 44; 26.2% were from 45 to 64; and 7.7% were 65 years of age or older. The gender makeup of the city was 49.2% male and 50.8% female.

=== 2000 census ===
As of the census of 2000, there were 6,247 people, 1,975 households, and 1,789 families residing in the city. The population density was 2,057.3 inhabitants per square mile (794.3/km^{2}). There were 2,032 housing units at an average density of 669.2 per square mile (258.4/km^{2}). The racial makeup of the city was 94.29% White, 1.55% African American, 0.10% Native American, 0.92% Asian, 0.22% from other races, and 0.85% from two or more races. Hispanic or Latino of any race were 1.09% of the population.

There were 1,975 households, out of which 56.7% had children under the age of 18 living with them, 86.1% were married couples living together, 3.3% had a female householder with no husband present, and 9.4% were non-families. 7.2% of all households were made up of individuals, and 1.3% had someone living alone who was 65 years of age or older. The average household size was 3.16 and the average family size was 3.34.

In the city, the population was spread out, with 35.9% under the age of 18, 2.7% from 18 to 24, 36.4% from 25 to 44, 21.1% from 45 to 64, and 3.8% who were 65 years of age or older. The median age was 35 years. For every 100 females, there were 100.9 males. For every 100 females age 18 and over, there were 97.7 males.

The median income for a household in the city was $115,904, and the median income for a family was $117,801. Males had a median income of $79,146 versus $42,656 for females. The per capita income for the city was $46,257. About 0.4% of families and 0.4% of the population were below the poverty line, including 0.7% of those under age 18 and none of those age 65 or over.

== Economy ==
Powell is a bedroom community north of Columbus. More than 90% of working residents commute to other municipalities for their employment.

== Government ==
Powell's local government is made up of city officials and staff, police and fire departments, and a variety of governmental agencies. The Powell City Council appoints specialized boards to address action items within the community. Some of these boards include the Powell Community Improvement Corporation, the Planning and Zoning Commission, the Historic Downtown Advisory Commission, and the Board of Zoning Appeals.

== Parks and Recreation ==
The City of Powell offers nine public parks, including Village Green Park, which is the location of the annual Powell Festival. Other parks include Adventure Park, Arbor Ridge Park, Library Park, Oak Park, Beechwood Park, Meadowview Park, Murphy Park, and Seldom Seen Park. The parks offer a wide range of sports facilities for basketball, volleyball, skating, tennis, pickle ball, and soccer. Additionally, Village Green Park offers a splash pad, concert amphitheater, playground, and pavilion shelters. Bike paths and multiuse trails connect many parks with the nearby subdivisions.

== Education ==
Powell is served by the Olentangy Local School District. The city is home to one of Olentangy Local School District's high schools, Olentangy Liberty High School, as well as Tyler Run Elementary. Olentangy Local School District received the highest rating of "excellent with distinction" on its 2020 report card from the Ohio Department of Education. Powell is also home to a kindergarten to grade 12 private college-preparatory school called Village Academy (closed summer 2019 due to a decline in enrollment).

Powell has two branches of the Delaware County District Library.

== Notable people ==
- A. J. Arcuri, NFL football player (Los Angeles Rams)
- Tala Ashe, Actress (Legends of Tomorrow)
- Jon Busch, MLS Soccer Player (Chicago Fire S.C.)
- Jai Chabria, political strategist and senior advisor to Governor Kasich
- D. Michael Crites, United States Attorney for the Southern District of Ohio
- Emily Douglas, founder of Grandma's Gifts
- Gary Levox, Rascal Flatts singer
- Seth Lucas, racing driver
- Thad Matta, former OSU basketball coach
- Chinedum Ndukwe, former NFL football player (Cincinnati Bengals and Oakland Raiders)
- Greg Oden, former NBA basketball player (Portland Trail Blazers, Miami Heat)
- Chris Perry, Former PGA golfer
- Michael Redd, former NBA basketball player (Milwaukee Bucks and Phoenix Suns)
- Lou Rosselli, wrestling coach (University of Oklahoma)
- Robert Smith, former NFL football player (Minnesota Vikings)
- Valerie Still, former ABL and WNBA basketball player (Columbus Quest and Washington Mystics)
- R. J. Umberger, NHL hockey player (Philadelphia Flyers, Columbus Blue Jackets)
- William White, former NFL football player (Detroit Lions, Kansas City Chiefs, and Atlanta Falcons)
