= Sunbury, Ohio =

- City
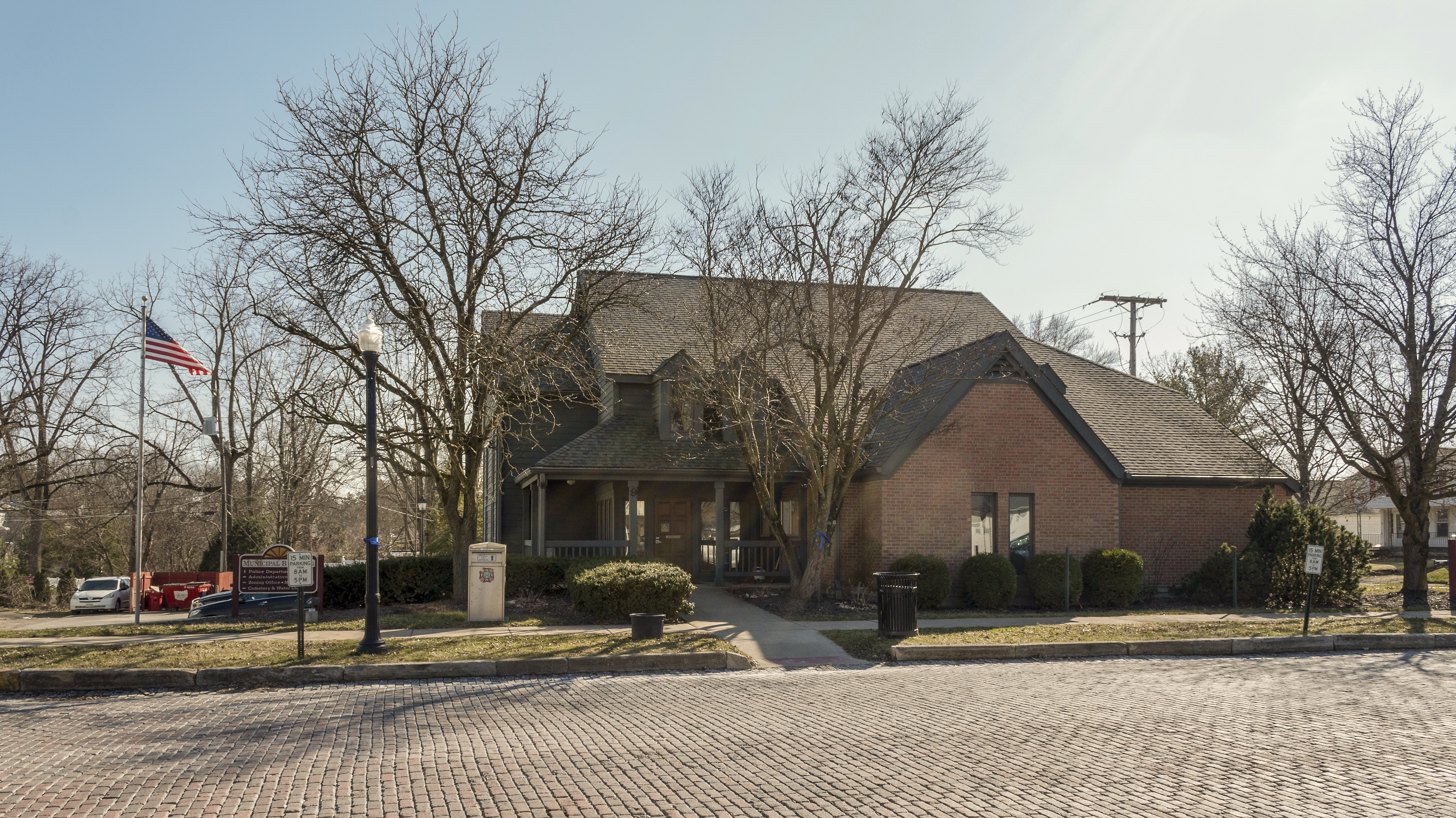
- Sunbury Administration Building
- Nickname: Memorial Town
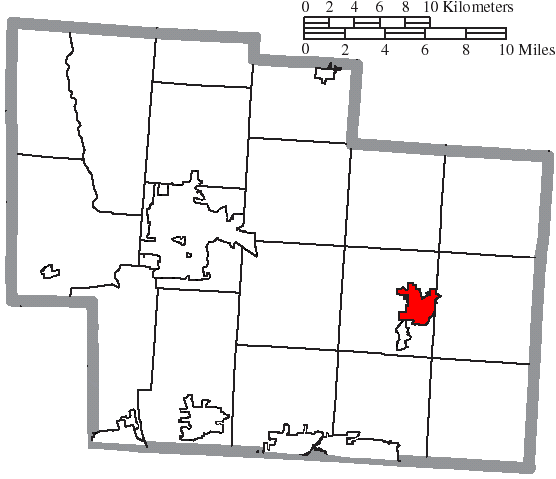
- Location of Sunbury in Delaware County

- Location within Ohio Location within the United States
- Coordinates: 40°14′54″N 82°52′50″W
- Country: United States
- State: Ohio
- County: Delaware

Area
  - Total: 4.83 sq mi (12.52 km^{2})
  - Land: 4.81 sq mi (12.47 km^{2})
  - Water: 0.019 sq mi (0.05 km^{2})
- Elevation: 948 ft (289 m)

Population (2020)
  - Total: 6,614
  - Estimate (2025): 8,857
  - Density: 1,373.9/sq mi (530.45/km^{2})
- Time zone: UTC-5 (Eastern (EST))
  - Summer (DST): UTC-4 (EDT)
- ZIP code: 43074
- Area codes: 740, 220
- FIPS code: 39-75602
- GNIS feature ID: 1086057
- Website: sunburyvillage.com

Sunbury is a city in Delaware County, Ohio, United States. The population was 6,614 at the 2020 census. It is part of the Columbus, Ohio metropolitan area. Sunbury went from being a village to a city on October 22, 2021.

== Geography ==
According to the United States Census Bureau, the city has a total area of 3.30 square miles (8.55 km^{2}), of which 3.28 square miles (8.50 km^{2}) are land and 0.02 square miles (0.05 km^{2}) are water.

Sunbury neighbors Galena, Ohio to the south, with which it shares a school district, Big Walnut Local Schools, and has provided services such as police. Sunbury is east of Delaware, Ohio (not to be confused with Delaware County, where they are both located).

== Demographics ==
Historical population
Census	Pop.	Note	%±
1850	337		—
1870	236		—
1880	340		44.1%
1890	475		39.7%
1900	464		−2.3%
1910	485		4.5%
1920	827		70.5%
1930	784		−5.2%
1940	846		7.9%
1950	936		10.6%
1960	1,360		45.3%
1970	2,512		84.7%
1980	2,101		−16.4%
1990	2,046		−2.6%
2000	2,630		28.5%
2010	4,389		66.9%
2020	6,614		50.7%
2025 (est.)	8,857		33.9%

=== 2010 census ===
As of the census of 2010, there were 4,389 people, 1,671 households, and 1,211 families living in the city. The population density was 1,338.1 inhabitants per square mile (516.6/km^{2}). There were 1,774 housing units at an average density of 540.9 per square mile (208.8/km^{2}). The racial makeup of the city was 95.2% White, 1.1% African American, 0.2% Native American, 1.1% Asian, 0.1% Pacific Islander, 0.8% from other races, and 1.5% from two or more races. Hispanic or Latino of any race were 1.7% of the population.

There were 1,671 households, of which 42.5% had children under the age of 18 living with them, 54.3% were married couples living together, 13.9% had a female householder with no husband present, 4.2% had a male householder with no wife present, and 27.5% were non-families. 23.1% of all households were made up of individuals, and 8.9% had someone living alone who was 65 years of age or older. The average household size was 2.62 and the average family size was 3.11.

The median age in the city was 33.6 years. 29.8% of residents were under the age of 18; 6.9% were between the ages of 18 and 24; 30.3% were from 25 to 44; 21.7% were from 45 to 64; and 11.4% were 65 years of age or older. The gender makeup of the city was 47.4% male and 52.6% female.

=== 2000 census ===
As of the census of 2000, there were 2,630 people, 1,016 households, and 771 families living in the city. The population density was 1,035.0 inhabitants per square mile (399.6/km^{2}). There were 1,057 housing units at an average density of 416.0 per square mile (160.6/km^{2}). The racial makeup of the city was 97.83% White, 0.38% African American, 0.38% Native American, 0.23% Asian, 0.04% Pacific Islander, 0.23% from other races, and 0.91% from two or more races. Hispanic or Latino of any race were 1.10% of the population. As of the 2010 census, the population had increased to 4,389.

There were 1,016 households, out of which 37.1% had children under the age of 18 living with them, 57.7% were married couples living together, 14.2% had a female householder with no husband present, and 24.1% were non-families. 20.8% of all households were made up of individuals, and 9.9% had someone living alone who was 65 years of age or older. The average household size was 2.56 and the average family size was 2.98.

26.6% of the population was under the age of 18, 7.2% from 18 to 24, 30.8% from 25 to 44, 22.3% from 45 to 64, and 13.1% who were 65 years of age or older. The median age was 36 years. For every 100 females there were 88.3 males. For every 100 females age 18 and over, there were 87.1 males.

The median income for a household in the city was $46,477, and the median income for a family was $50,750. Males had a median income of $38,281 versus $28,210 for females. The per capita income for the city was $18,861. About 4.1% of families and 4.7% of the population were below the poverty line, including 4.9% of those under age 18 and 5.0% of those age 65 or over.

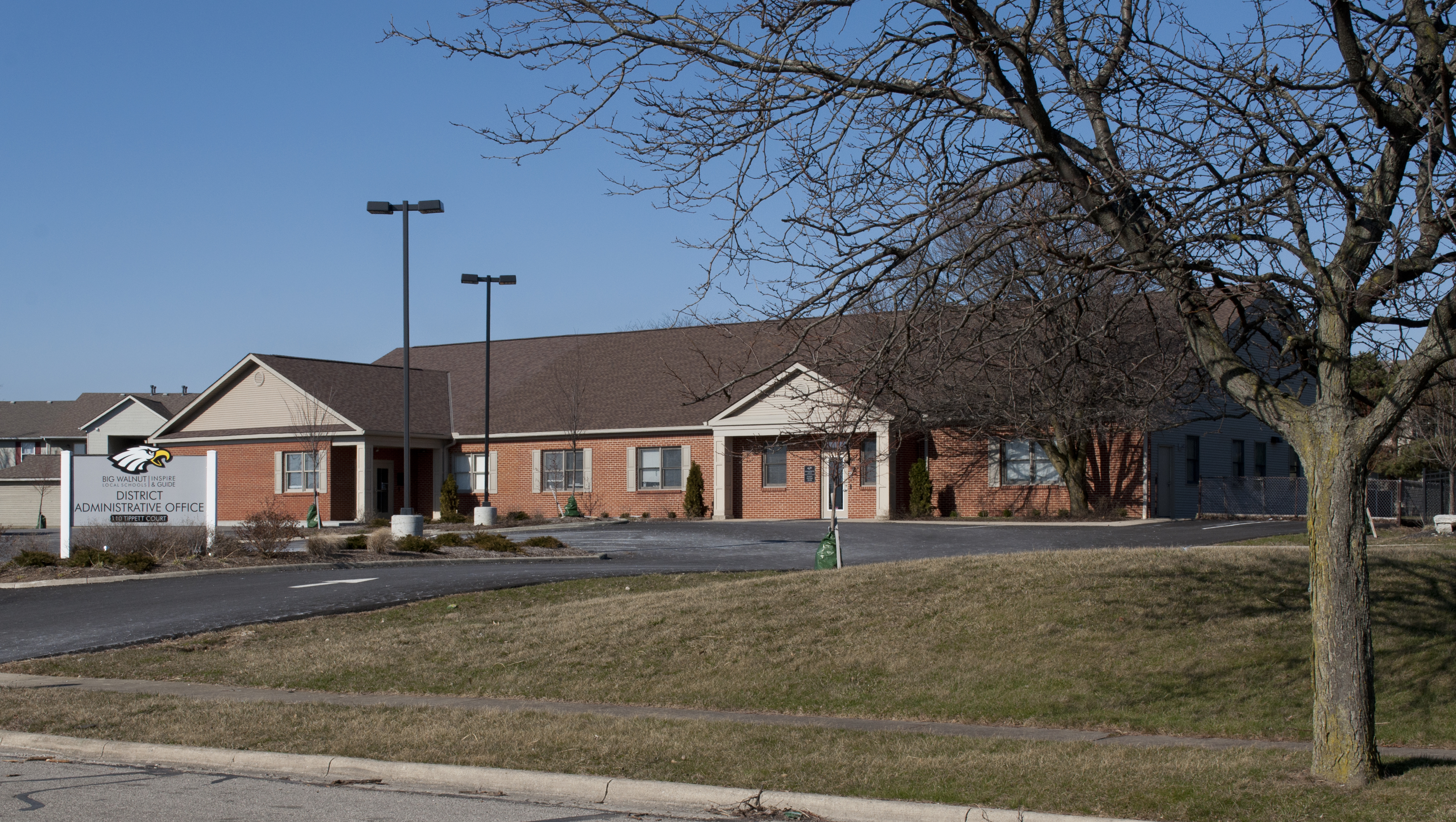
Big Walnut School District Administrative Office

== Education ==
Sunbury is home to the Big Walnut Local School District. The district contains four Elementary Schools, one Intermediate School, one Middle School, and one High School. The district also serves students in the neighboring town of Galena, Ohio.

== Public services ==
Emergency medical services are provided by the Delaware County EMS and Station 2. Police services are provided by the Sunbury Police Department.

== Notable people ==
Billy Southworth - American outfielder and manager in Major League Baseball (MLB)
