= Lewis Center, Ohio =

Unincorporated community in Delaware County, Ohio

Coordinates: 40°11′54″N 83°00′37″W

Map

Lewis Center (also Lewis Centre) is an unincorporated community in northwestern Orange Township, Delaware County, Ohio, United States, in the Columbus metropolitan area.

Lewis Center was originally a small community centered at the (since closed) railroad station. Following rapid development of the surrounding area since the 1990's, it is now coterminous with the 43035 ZIP code, encompassing most of the township and the northern most part of the city of Columbus. The Lewis Center area lies on the east side of the Olentangy River, across from the city of Powell, west of Alum Creek State Park and north of the Polaris shopping hub. It is located in the Olentangy Local School District.

Lewis Center has a population of 30,398 with an average population density of 1371 people per square mile. The median age in Lewis Center is 33.6, slightly below the United States average of 36.8. The median per capita income in Lewis Center is $49,690 and the median household income is $140,076. Lewis Center is also home of the Olentangy School District, one of Ohio's highest scoring school districts. The district includes 4 high schools. Due to a higher median income, the area has been in a real estate boom, further amplified by the coronavirus pandemic. Newer development such as Evans Farm have resulted in thousands of new houses being built each year. There are many thriving suburban neighborhoods, like Olentangy Meadows, Oak Creek, Alum Creek, Walker Wood, Glen Oak, North Orange, and the Meadows at Lewis Center. Since 2000, the place has seen itself become a growing suburb of Columbus.

== Demographics ==
=== 2020 census ===
Lewis Center racial composition
Race	Number	Percentage
White (NH)	28,201	63.0%
Black or African American (NH)	1,897	5.74%
Native American (NH)	65	0.20%
Asian (NH)	6,664	20.2%
Pacific Islander (NH)	6	0.02%
Other/mixed	2,394	7.24%
Hispanic or Latino	1,203	3.64%

== History ==
Lewis Center was founded around 1850 when the railroad was extended to that point. The community was named after the family of William L. Lewis, who gave their land for a railroad station in exchange for the naming rights. A post office called Lewis Centre was established in 1852, and the name was changed to Lewis Center in 1893.

Looking at the ancestry of the community members, 31.1% are of German descent. 14.9% are of Irish descent and 10.7% are of English descent.

== Notable people ==
- Kenny Anunike, Member of the Denver Broncos 2016 Super Bowl team
- Ethan Grunkemeyer, Quarterback at Penn State and Virginia Tech
- Zac Kerin, Member of the Tennessee Titans NFL team
- Frederick S. Nave, Arizona territorial judge
- Joshua Perry, former NFL player, current resident
- Frank B. Willis, Governor of Ohio from 1915 to 1917
