= Pickerington High School =

Pickerington High School may refer to:

- Pickerington High School Central
- Pickerington High School North
