= DaVon Hamilton =

American football player (born 1997)

No. 52 – Jacksonville Jaguars
- Position: Defensive tackle
- Roster status: Injured reserve

Personal information
- Born: February 1, 1997 (age 29); Pickerington, Ohio, U.S.
- Listed height: 6 ft 4 in (1.93 m)
- Listed weight: 335 lb (152 kg)

Career information
- High school: Pickerington
- College: Ohio State (2015–2019)
- NFL draft: 2020: 3rd round, 73rd overall pick

Career history
- Jacksonville Jaguars (2020–present)

Awards and highlights
- Third-team All-Big Ten (2019)

Career NFL statistics as of 2026
- Total tackles: 260
- Sacks: 6
- Forced fumbles: 2
- Fumble recoveries: 4
- Pass deflections: 4
- Stats at Pro Football Reference

DaVon Hamilton (born February 1, 1997) is an American professional football defensive tackle for the Jacksonville Jaguars of the National Football League (NFL). He played college football for the Ohio State Buckeyes.

== Early life ==
Hamilton attended Pickerington High School Central in Pickerington, Ohio. He originally committed to the University of Kentucky to play college football but switched to Ohio State University.

== College career ==
Hamilton played at Ohio State from 2015 to 2019. After redshirting his first year, he played in 54 games over the next four. He finished his career with 66 tackles and seven sacks.

== Professional career ==
Pre-draft measurables
| Height | Weight | Arm length | Hand span | Wingspan | 40-yard dash | 10-yard split | 20-yard split | Three-cone drill | Vertical jump | Broad jump | Bench press |
|---|---|---|---|---|---|---|---|---|---|---|---|
| 6 ft 3 3/4 in (1.92 m) | 320 lb (145 kg) | 33 in (0.84 m) | 9 3/4 in (0.25 m) | 6 ft 7 1/4 in (2.01 m) | 5.14 s | 1.80 s | 2.98 s | 7.72 s | 29.5 in (0.75 m) | 8 ft 6 in (2.59 m) | 33 reps |
All values from NFL Combine

Hamilton was selected by the Jacksonville Jaguars in the third round (73rd overall) of the 2020 NFL draft. He was placed on the reserve/COVID-19 list by the Jaguars on July 27, 2020, and was activated six days later.

In Week 10 against the Green Bay Packers, Hamilton recorded his first career sack on Aaron Rodgers during the 24–20 loss. On December 5, 2020, Hamilton was placed on injured reserve.

On April 26, 2023, Hamilton signed a three-year, $34.5 million contract extension with Jacksonville. He was placed on injured reserve on August 31, 2023. He was activated on October 28.

On November 30, 2025, during a Week 13 victory against the Tennessee Titans, Hamilton served as an emergency long snapper after starter Ross Matiscik was injured during the first quarter. Hamilton, who had practiced long snapping throughout his time in Jacksonville, handled snaps for an extra point, field goal, and three punts before Matiscik returned in the third quarter. Teammates and coaches praised Hamilton's performance, noting both the difficulty of the position and his longstanding readiness to fill in. Hamilton described the opportunity as exciting but emphasized his preference to leave the job to Matiscik.

Hamilton reprised the emergency long snapper role in a 19–17 victory against the Philadelphia Eagles in Tottenham Hotspur Stadium, after Matiscik suffered a shoulder injury during the first half. He handled the snap for a game-winning field goal by Cam Little as time expired.

During a 42–7 victory against the Indianapolis Colts, Hamilton suffered a torn quadriceps injury in the second quarter. After the game, he was ruled out for the season.

== NFL career statistics ==
Legend
| **Bold** | Career high |

=== Regular season ===
| Year | Team | Games | | Tackles | | | | | Interceptions | | | | | | Fumbles | | | | |
| Year | Team | GP | GS | Cmb | Solo | Ast | Sck | TFL | Int | Yds | Avg | Lng | TD | PD | FF | Fum | FR | Yds | TD |
|---|---|---|---|---|---|---|---|---|---|---|---|---|---|---|---|---|---|---|---|
| 2020 | JAX | 11 | 6 | 30 | 14 | 16 | 1.0 | 2 | 0 | 0 | 0.0 | 0 | 0 | 1 | 0 | 0 | **1** | 0 | 0 |
| 2021 | JAX | 16 | 8 | 46 | 26 | 20 | 1.0 | 2 | 0 | 0 | 0.0 | 0 | 0 | **2** | 0 | 0 | **1** | 0 | 0 |
| 2022 | JAX | **17** | 14 | 56 | 27 | **29** | **2.5** | **5** | 0 | 0 | 0.0 | 0 | 0 | 1 | **1** | 0 | **1** | 0 | 0 |
| 2023 | JAX | 8 | 2 | 12 | 7 | 5 | 0.0 | 1 | 0 | 0 | 0.0 | 0 | 0 | 0 | 0 | 0 | 0 | 0 | 0 |
| 2024 | JAX | **17** | 14 | **62** | **34** | 28 | 0.0 | **5** | 0 | 0 | 0.0 | 0 | 0 | 0 | 0 | 0 | 0 | 0 | 0 |
| 2025 | JAX | **17** | **17** | 38 | 15 | 23 | 1.0 | 3 | 0 | 0 | 0.0 | 0 | 0 | 0 | 0 | 0 | 0 | 0 | 0 |
| 2026 | JAX | 7 | 7 | 16 | 8 | 8 | 0.5 | 0 | 0 | 0 | 0.0 | 0 | 0 | 0 | **1** | 0 | **1** | 0 | 0 |
| Career | | 93 | 68 | 260 | 131 | 129 | 6.0 | 18 | 0 | 0 | 0.0 | 0 | 0 | 4 | 2 | 0 | 4 | 0 | 0 |

=== Postseason ===
| Year | Team | Games | | Tackles | | | | | Interceptions | | | | | | Fumbles | | | | |
| Year | Team | GP | GS | Cmb | Solo | Ast | Sck | TFL | Int | Yds | Avg | Lng | TD | PD | FF | Fum | FR | Yds | TD |
|---|---|---|---|---|---|---|---|---|---|---|---|---|---|---|---|---|---|---|---|
| 2022 | JAX | 2 | 2 | **8** | **3** | **5** | 0.0 | **1** | 0 | 0 | 0.0 | 0 | 0 | **2** | 0 | 0 | 0 | 0 | 0 |
| 2025 | JAX | 1 | 1 | 3 | 2 | 1 | 0.0 | 0 | 0 | 0 | 0.0 | 0 | 0 | 0 | 0 | 0 | 0 | 0 | 0 |
| Career | | 3 | 3 | 11 | 5 | 6 | 0.0 | 1 | 0 | 0 | 0.0 | 0 | 0 | 2 | 0 | 0 | 0 | 0 | 0 |

== Personal life ==
Hamilton is a Christian. He is married to Julia Hamilton. They have three sons together. Hamilton is the older brother of Los Angeles Rams defensive tackle Ty Hamilton.
