= Savarese =

Savarese is a surname of Italian origin, and may refer to:

== People ==
- Ugo Savarese (1912–1997), Italian operatic baritone
- Sergio Savarese (1958–2006), Italian furniture designer
- Julia Savarese (b. 1926), American writer
- Tom Savarese (1944), American DJ
- Ralph Savarese (b. 1960s), American academic, writer, poet, and activist
- Lou Savarese (1965), American professional boxer
- George Savarese (1967/1968), American television commentator, radio journalist, and teacher
- Jill Gray Savarese (1969), American actor
- Giovanni Savarese (1970), Venezuelan professional football player and coach

== Other ==
- Savarese, a comic by Robin Wood and Domingo Roberto Mandrafina
