= Igwebuike =

Igwebuike (ig-way-BYOO-kay) is a surname. Notable people with the surname include:

- Donald Igwebuike (born 1960), American football player
- Godwin Igwebuike (born 1994), American football player
