= Ty Hamilton =

American football player (born 2002)

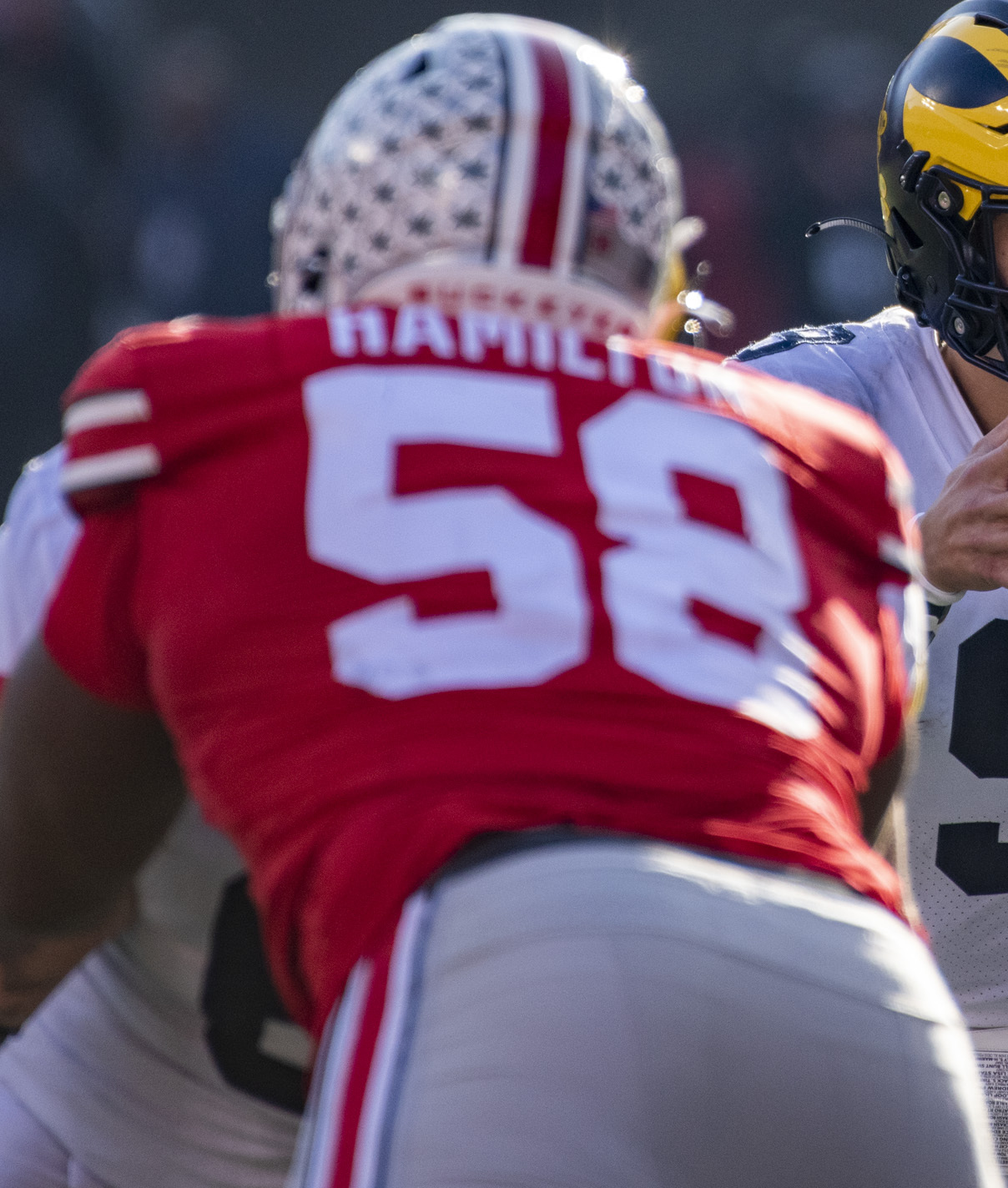
- Hamilton in 2022

No. 57 – Los Angeles Rams
- Position: Nose tackle
- Roster status: Active

Personal information
- Born: April 15, 2002 (age 24); Pickerington, Ohio, U.S.
- Listed height: 6 ft 3 in (1.91 m)
- Listed weight: 301 lb (137 kg)

Career information
- High school: Pickerington Central (OH)
- College: Ohio State (2020–2024)
- NFL draft: 2025: 5th round, 148th overall pick

Career history
- Los Angeles Rams (2025–present)

Awards and highlights
- CFP national champion (2024)

Career NFL statistics as of 2025
- Total tackles: 11
- Stats at Pro Football Reference

Ty Hamilton (born April 15, 2002) is an American professional football nose tackle for the Los Angeles Rams of the National Football League (NFL). He played college football for the Ohio State Buckeyes and was selected by the Rams in the fifth round of the 2025 NFL draft.

== Early life ==
Hamilton attended Pickerington High School Central in Pickerington, Ohio. He was rated as a three-star recruit and committed to play college football for the Ohio State Buckeyes over offers from Michigan and Penn State.

== College career ==
As a freshman, Hamilton made appearances against Nebraska and Rutgers, registering no stats. Taking on a larger role in 2021 as a redshirt freshmen, he tallied 13 tackles with two being for a loss, two sacks, a pass deflection, and a fumble recovery. In week 10 of the 2022 season, Hamilton got his first career start versus Northwestern where he had three tackles. He finished the 2022 season with 19 tackles, with half a tackle being for a loss, half a sack, and a pass deflection. In the 2023 season, Hamilton was named honorable mention all-Big Ten Conference. In his final year of eligibility in 2024, he set a career-high in combined tackles (40), sacks (2.5) and forced fumbles (1) and was named a Reese's Senior Bowl Midseason All-American on the defensive line.

== Professional career ==
Pre-draft measurables
Height	Weight	Arm length	Hand span	Wingspan	40-yard dash	10-yard split	20-yard split	20-yard shuttle	Three-cone drill	Vertical jump	Broad jump	Bench press
6 ft 2 7/8 in (1.90 m)	299 lb (136 kg)	32 1/4 in (0.82 m)	10 1/8 in (0.26 m)	6 ft 6 5/8 in (2.00 m)	4.95 s	1.70 s	2.82 s	4.68 s	7.78 s	32 in (0.81 m)	9 ft 3 in (2.82 m)	35 reps
All values from NFL Combine/Pro Day

=== Los Angeles Rams ===
Hamilton was drafted by the Los Angeles Rams in the fifth round with the 148th pick in the 2025 NFL draft. As a rookie nose tackle, Hamilton played in 14 games and totaled 11 tackles on the season.

== NFL career statistics ==
Legend
**Bold**	Career high

=== Regular season ===
Year	Team	Games		Tackles					Interceptions						Fumbles				
Year	Team	GP	GS	Cmb	Solo	Ast	Sck	TFL	Int	Yds	Avg	Lng	TD	PD	FF	Fum	FR	Yds	TD
2025	LAR	14	0	11	1	10	0.0	0	0	0	0.0	0	0	0	0	0	0	0	0
Career		14	0	11	1	10	0.0	0	0	0	0.0	0	0	0	0	0	0	0	0

== Personal life ==
Hamilton is the younger brother of Jacksonville Jaguars defensive lineman, DaVon Hamilton.
