= Shane Bowen =

American football player and coach (born 1986)

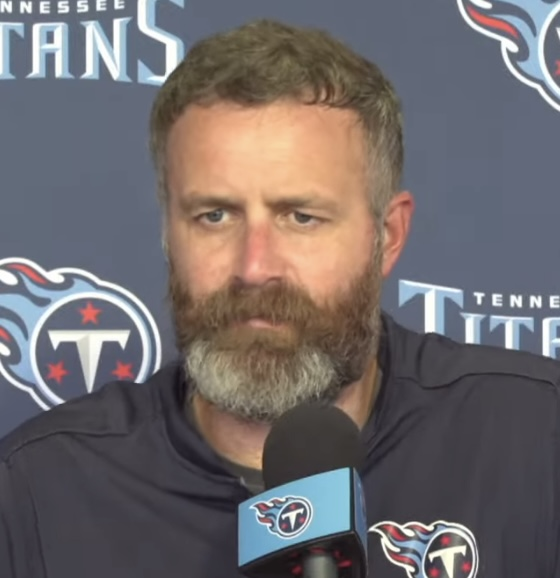
- Bowen with the Tennessee Titans in 2021

New England Patriots
- Title: Defensive analyst

Personal information
- Born: December 9, 1986 (age 39); Pickerington, Ohio, U.S.

Career information
- Position: Linebacker
- High school: Pickerington Central
- College: Georgia Tech

Career history
- Georgia Tech (2009) Student assistant; Georgia Tech (2010–2011) Graduate assistant; Ohio State (2012) Graduate assistant; Kennesaw State (2013–2015) Linebackers coach; Houston Texans (2016–2017) Defensive assistant; Tennessee Titans (2018–2020) Outside linebackers coach; Tennessee Titans (2021–2023) Defensive coordinator; New York Giants (2024–2025) Defensive coordinator; New England Patriots (2026–present) Defensive analyst
- Coaching profile at Pro Football Reference

Shane Andrew Bowen (born December 9, 1986) is an American professional football coach who is currently a defensive analyst for the New England Patriots of the National Football League (NFL). He previously served as the defensive coordinator for the Tennessee Titans and New York Giants as well as an assistant coach for the Houston Texans. Before his NFL coaching career, Bowen served as an assistant coach at Georgia Tech, Ohio State, and Kennesaw State.

== Playing career ==
=== High school ===
Bowen played safety for Pickerington Central High School from 2001 to 2004. In his junior year, Bowen was selected to the second team All-Ohio Capital Conference team. In his senior year, Bowen piled up 188 tackles and three interceptions. As a result, he was awarded the Ohio Capital Conference Player of the year. Bowen was also awarded first team All-Central District honors and the Associated Press’ second team All-Ohio honors. One of his teammates at Pickerington Central was A. J. Trapasso, a punter who was signed by the Tennessee Titans as an unrestricted free agent.

=== College ===
Bowen received college football scholarship offers from Georgia Tech, Iowa State and Vanderbilt. In May 2005, he committed to play for coach Chan Gailey at Georgia Tech. However, Bowen did not join the program until 2006. He sat out the fall 2005 season, working part-time at a Pickerington pizza restaurant. Bowen's 2006 Yellow Jackets recruiting class included Demaryius Thomas, a wide receiver and first round pick in the 2010 NFL draft.

Bowen played safety in high school, but he converted to the linebacker position at Georgia Tech. In his three years with the Yellow Jackets, Bowen totaled 54 tackles and five sacks. His last game as a player was on November 20, 2008 against then-23rd ranked Miami. Bowen had five tackles and a sack in the team's 41–23 upset victory. In the next game against Boston College, he was scheduled to play his 39th consecutive game and make his first start of the season, but a routine check-up revealed a cervical disc displacement. This injury ended Bowen's playing career.

As a student, Bowen was named to the Dean's List three times. In 2009, he received a Bachelor of Science degree in business management from Georgia Tech. In 2014, Bowen earned a master's degree in workforce development and education, also from Georgia Tech.

== Coaching career ==
=== Early career ===
The injury that ended Bowen's playing career in his junior season did not keep him away from the team's sideline in his senior year. In 2009, Bowen began his coaching career as a student assistant at Georgia Tech. He finished the year assisting with the linebackers before being named an offensive graduate assistant in 2010. Bowen held that position for two years. In 2012, Urban Meyer became the head coach at Ohio State. Bowen joined Meyer's coaching team as a defensive graduate assistant where he assisted the team's defensive line coach, Mike Vrabel. The Buckeyes concluded the year with a 12–0 mark and ranked No. 3 nationally. In 2013, Kennesaw State launched its football program and hired Brian Bohannon as the team's first head coach. Bohannon was the quarterbacks coach at Georgia Tech when Bowen served as a graduate assistant. One of Bohannon's first additions to his staff was Bowen. In 2015, the Owls defied expectations and finished its inaugural season with a winning record with Bowen serving as the team's linebackers coach.

=== Houston Texans ===
In 2016, Bowen began his NFL coaching career with the Houston Texans as a defensive assistant where he reunited with Mike Vrabel, the Texans' linebackers coach. Bowen served in this position for the 2016 and 2017 seasons. Houston finished the 2016 season with the NFL's top-ranked defense for the first time in franchise history, surrendering an average of only 301.3 total net yards per game. They also gave up the fewest first downs (17.0) and second-fewest net passing yards (201.6) per game. In 2017, Vrabel was promoted to defensive coordinator. Under Vrabel's guidance and Bowen's assistance, the Texans ranked fifth in the NFL in third-down defense and set a franchise record for fewest yards per carry by opponents (3.97).

=== Tennessee Titans ===
On January 20, 2018, Mike Vrabel was named head coach of the Tennessee Titans. Ten days later, Vrabel named Bowen as the team's outside linebacker coach. Bowen's new role reunited him with Derrick Morgan, a defensive teammate during Bowen's playing career at Georgia Tech. Morgan was drafted in the first round of the 2010 NFL draft by the Titans and played nine years with the Titans as an outside linebacker. Bowen had the honor of serving as Morgan's position coach in 2018, his final season in the NFL since Morgan retired following the season.

In 2018, the Titans' defense ranked eighth overall (333.4 yards per game), third in points allowed (18.9 per game), tenth on third down (36.6 percent), and second in the red zone (44.7 touchdown percentage). Bowen helped two rookies: second-round draft pick Harold Landry and undrafted free agent Sharif Finch combine for six sacks.

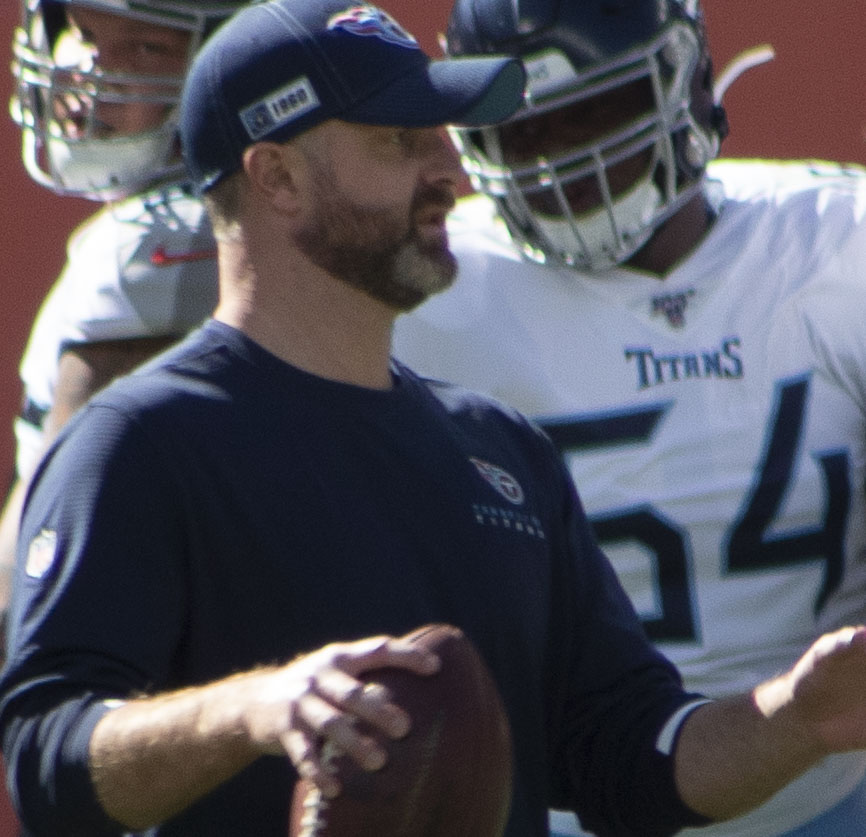
Bowen in 2019

In 2019, the Titans' defensive backs were again a top-10 unit in passing yards and interceptions. The Titans made the playoffs but lost to the Kansas City Chiefs in the AFC Championship Game.

After the 2019 season, defensive coordinator Dean Pees retired. Beginning with the 2020 season, Vrabel assumed many of the duties once held by Pees. However, Vrabel entrusted Bowen with the role of defensive play caller throughout most of the season while the latter served as outside linebackers coach.

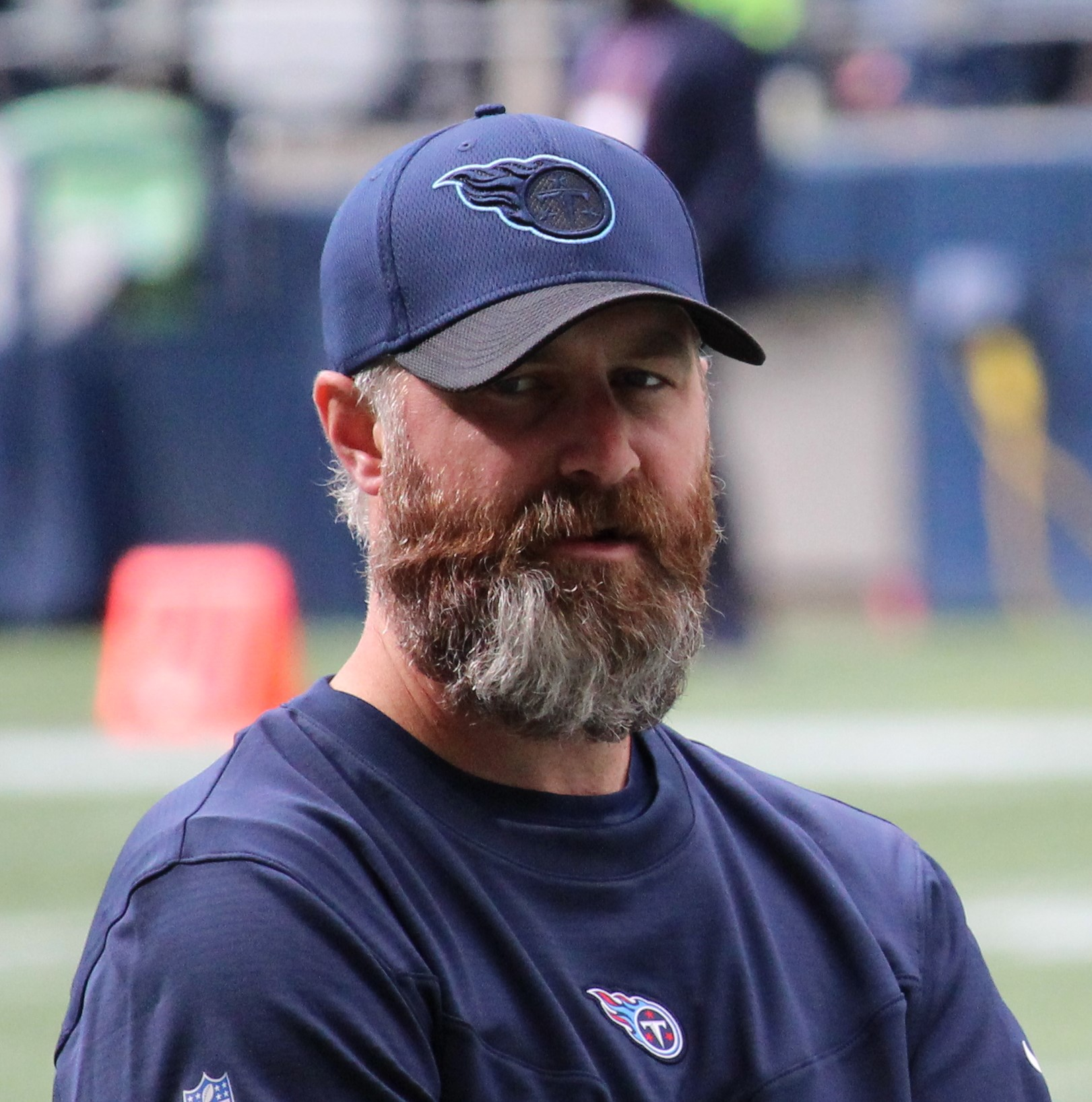
Bowen in 2021

On January 29, 2021, Bowen was promoted to defensive coordinator. In 2021, the Titans finished the season with a 12–5 record, won the American Football Conference (AFC) South Division, and earned the AFC’s overall #1 seed going into the playoffs. The defense finished the season among the NFL’s best in multiple categories: #4 in touchdowns per game, #4 in opponent’s red zone scoring, #6 in third-down conversion rate, and #6 in points per game.

=== New York Giants ===
On February 6, 2024, Bowen was hired by the New York Giants as their defensive coordinator under head coach Brian Daboll.

During Week 7 of the 2025 season, Bowen was held under scrutiny after giving up 33 points to the Denver Broncos in the fourth quarter, narrowly losing on the road 33–32. He was fired by the Giants on November 24 following another blown fourth quarter lead against the Detroit Lions.

=== New England Patriots ===
On April 10, 2026, Bowen was hired to serve as a defensive analyst for the New England Patriots, reuniting him with head coach Mike Vrabel.

== Personal life ==
Bowen is the son of Phil and Cathy Bowen and has a brother and a sister. He met his wife, Courtney Lane, in 2011 while he was a graduate assistant at Georgia Tech. She was hired that year by Georgia Tech as the football team's Administrative Coordinator for Recruiting and holds both a bachelor's degree in public relations and master's degree in sports management from the University of Tennessee. They got married in 2015 and have two children: Harper Belle and Brooks.
