= Pickerington Ponds Metro Park =

Park and nature preserve in Central Ohio, U.S.

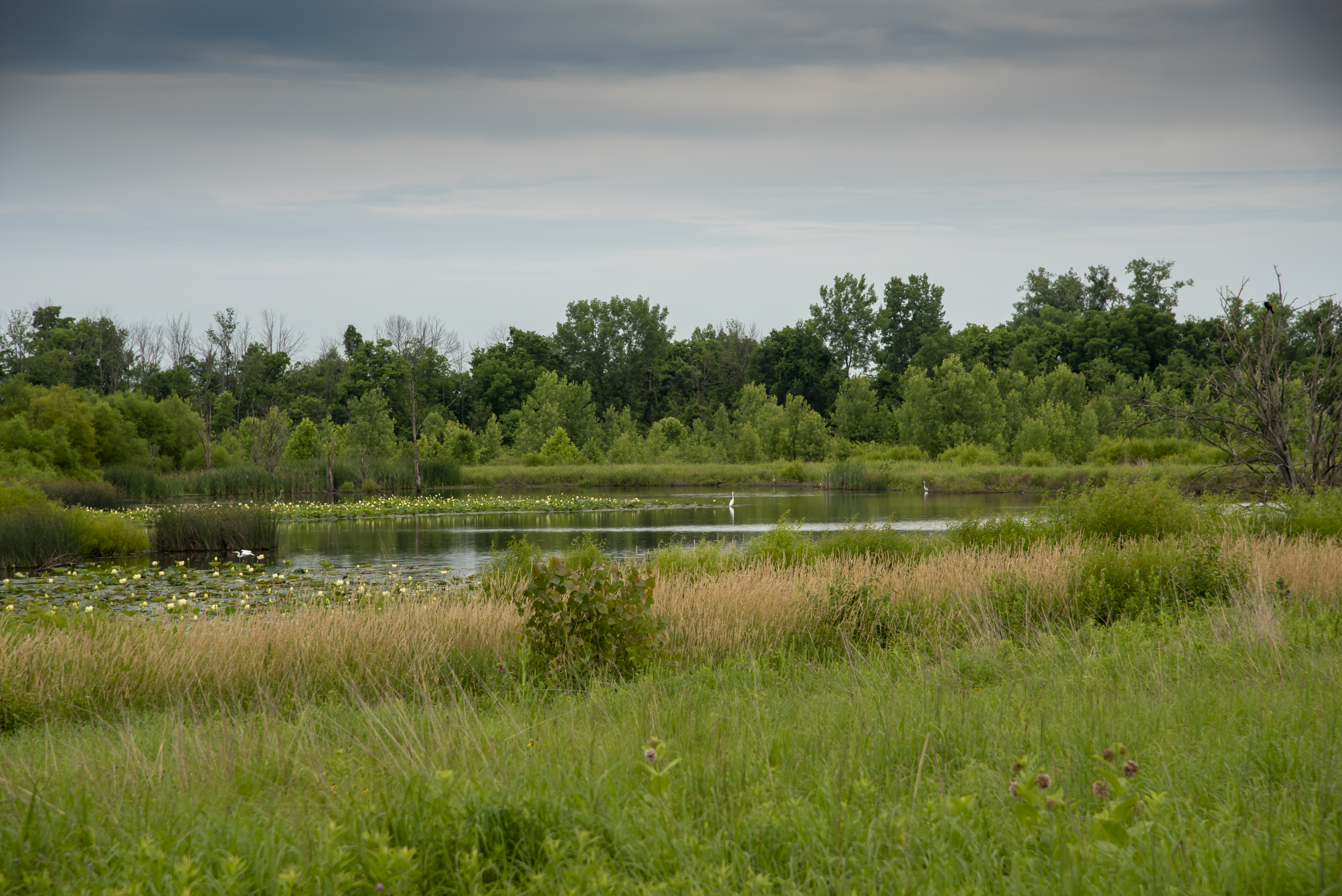
- Interactive map of Pickerington Ponds Metro Park
- Type: Metro park
- Location: 7680 Wright Road, Canal Winchester, Ohio
- Coordinates: 39°53′10″N 82°48′11″W
- Area: 1,608 acres (651 ha)
- Administrator: Columbus and Franklin County Metro Parks
- Open: Year-round
- Parking: Multiple lots
- Website: Official website

Pickerington Ponds Metro Park is a metropolitan park in Pickerington and Columbus, Ohio, owned and operated by Columbus and Franklin County Metro Parks. The park has 1,608 acres (651 ha) with several trails and five overlooks for bird and other wildlife watching. It is a State Nature Preserve, primarily focused on providing a habitat for various birds and contains many wetland areas. More than 260 species of birds have been seen here. The park is designated as an Important Bird Area (IBA) by The Audubon Society.

== History ==
The land was shaped by the glaciers in the Wisconsin Glaciation about 18,000 years ago, forming a depressed wetland area and a partially wooded natural dam. In the 19th century, most of the land was owned by the Wright and Bowen families whose names mark the crossroads in the park. The wetlands have been an attraction for local birdwatchers since the 1930s, or potentially earlier. Beginning in 1974, citizens and conservationists began working on raising the money needed to buy the land and take them into public ownership. The first 153 acres which included a glacial kettle lake were turned over to the metro parks system around 1979.

During the land acquisition process, the park was first a state nature preserve, the Wetland Wildlife Refuge. Pickerington Ponds Metro Park opened in 1989 with 413 acres.

The 1990s saw proposals for housing developments and zoning changes in the area. An engineering study was commissioned to understand how the wetlands would be affected by storm water runoff from the proposed development. The report concluded that runoff could pollute the wetlands and contaminate municipal water supplies leading to an increase in land holdings to protect the watershed.
