= Pickerington Local School District =

School District in Ohio, United States

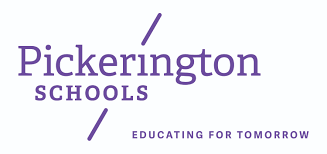

Address
- 90 East Street Pickerington, Ohio, 43147; United States

District information
- Type: Public
- Motto: Education For Tomorrow
- Grades: PK–12
- Established: 1905; 121 years ago
- Superintendent: Dr. Charles Smialek
- Schools: 16
- NCES District ID: 3904689

Students and staff
- Students: 11,729 (2024–2025)
- Teachers: 614.93 (on an FTE basis) (2024–2025)
- Staff: 1,076.58 (on an FTE basis) (2024–2025)
- Student–teacher ratio: 19.07 (2024–2025)
- Athletic conference: Ohio Capital Conference

Other information
- Website: www.plsd.us

Pickerington Local School District, formerly Violet Township Schools (1905–1939), is a public school district in Ohio. It serves most of the city of Pickerington, Ohio, as well as part of the city of Columbus, Reynoldsburg, Canal Winchester and unincorporated parts of Fairfield and Franklin Counties. In the 1980s and 90s it was the fastest growing school district in Ohio over a five-year period. It is highly rated by NicheNiche. In 2004 the district was rated excellent by the state of Ohio. It is the taxing authority for the Pickerington Public Library as well as for the school district.

== History ==
=== November 8, 2022 bond issue ===
In the November general election Pickerington Local Schools (PLSD) passed a $89.930 million bond issue aimed at reducing the overcrowding in the school district. It was the third attempt for a bond issue with the first one in November 2020 and May 2021. This proposed bond is about $5 million lower than similar ballot issues that were turned down in November 2020 and May 2021; it took out all of the extracurricular projects. The funds will allow the district to build a third junior high school that will accommodate 1,300 students and renovate Ridgeview Junior High School to convert it into a separate K-4 elementary school and 5th-6th grade middle school. This will create an eighth elementary school for 450 students and a fourth middle school for 450 students. The funds will also help the school purchase and renovate a property on Yarmouth Road to convert in to a preschool building. Upon renovation, the building would house 15 preschool classes that serve four elementary schools.

In the works now, bond proceeds, along with some previously allocated General Funds, will be used to:

- Construct McGill Junior High School, located at the McGill property. Construction will also include bleachers, concession stands, two locker rooms, a press box, parking and a roadway to accommodate the new junior high's athletic teams.
- Renovate Ridgeview Junior High School.
- Central High School — add classrooms, expand the cafeteria, renovate the courtyard, add turf and a baseball field with dugouts.
- North High School — add classrooms, renovate the courtyard, add turf and a softball field with dugouts.
- Add flexible furniture throughout other schools.
- Relocate PLSD's Technology Department into Heritage Elementary.
- Renovate the existing building on Yarmouth Road to be used for preschool classrooms.

== Schools ==
=== Elementary (1-4) ===
| School | Location |
|---|---|
| Fairfield Elementary | Violet Township, Ohio |
| Heritage Elementary | Pickerington, Ohio |
| Pickerington Elementary | Pickerington, Ohio |
| Violet Elementary | Violet Township, Ohio |
| Tussing Elementary | Reynoldsburg, Ohio |
| Sycamore Creek Elementary | Pickerington, Ohio |
| Toll Gate Elementary | Violet Township, Ohio |

=== Middle (5–6) ===
| School | Location | Principal | Assistant Principal |
|---|---|---|---|
| Ridgeview Middle | 130 Hill Rd S Suite C, Pickerington, OH 43147 | Eric Koch | Amanda Stemm |
| Harmon Middle | 12410 Harmon Rd Pickerington, OH 43147 | Jared Moore | Carlita Bell |
| Toll Gate Middle | 12183 Toll Gate Rd Pickerington, OH 43147 | Ryan Morford | |

=== Junior High (7–8) ===
| School | Location | Color | Mascot | Enrollment | Principal | Assistant Principal | Feeder |
|---|---|---|---|---|---|---|---|
| Lakeview Junior High | 12445 Ault Rd Pickerington, OH 43147 | Black, Silver, and White | Panther | 873 (22–23) | Ben Baptist | Joetta Gregory, Andrea Patridge | Tollgate and Harmon Middle |
| Pickerington Central Junior High | 457 Lockville Road Pickerington, OH 43147 | Purple and White | Tiger | 846 (22–23) | Sheila Evans | Henry Lee, Kevin Smith | Tollgate and Ridgeview Middle |

=== High School (9–12) ===
| School | Location | Color | Mascot | Principal | Assistant Principal | Feeder |
|---|---|---|---|---|---|---|
| Pickerington High School North | 7800 Refugee Road Pickerington, OH 43147 | Black, Silver, and White | Panther | Mike Hudak | Kimberly Cox, John Downing, Victoria Korzecki, Pamela Waits | Lakeview Junior High |
| Pickerington High School Central | 300 Opportunity Way Pickerington, OH 43147 | Purple and White | Tiger | Roshawn Parker | Joseph Cooper, Lazaro Fuentes, Michael Yinger, Carly Wells | Pickerington Central Junior High |

=== Other Schools ===
| School | Location | Building |
|---|---|---|
| Pickerington Kindergarten Center | Pickerington, Ohio | Former Diley Middle |
| Pickerington Early Learning Center | Pickerington, Ohio | 13430 Yarmouth Dr. |
| Pickerington Academy | Violet Township, Ohio | Pickerington High School North |
| Virtual Learning Academy | Whole District | Online |

=== Career Center ===
| School | Location | Satellite Locations | School Districts | Grades |
|---|---|---|---|---|
| Eastland-Fairfield Career & Technical Schools | Eastland: Groveport, Ohio Fairfield: Carrol, Ohio | Lincoln High School; Groveport Madison High School; New Albany High School; Pickerington High School North; Canal Winchester High School | 16 School Districts | 11–12 |

== Ohio University Lancaster classes ==
In the spring of 2023, Ohio University Lancaster will be offering classes at Pickerington North High School. Initially the four topics available are communication, English, philosophy and psychology. They are designed for both Ohio University and high school students. The high school students can obtain credit under the university's Credit Plus program.

== Grants ==
The district has worked with local partners to obtain a grant from the federally funded Safe Routes to School grant program. In 2012 they received a $460,000 grant from The Ohio Department of Transportation for the program.
