= Godwin Igwebuike =

American football player (born 1994)

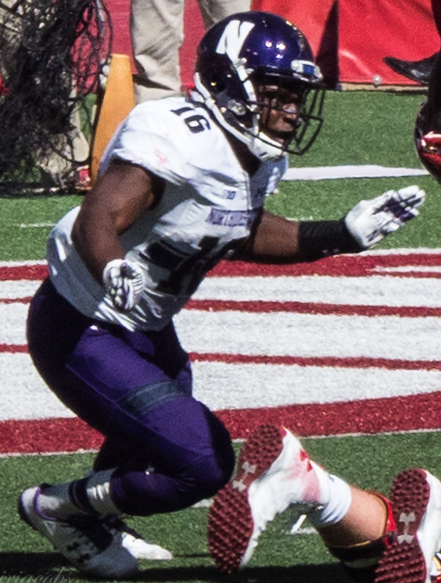
- Igwebuike with the Northwestern Wildcats in 2017

No. 34, 35, 40, 38, 42, 48
- Position: Running back

Personal information
- Born: September 10, 1994 (age 32); Pickerington, Ohio, U.S.
- Listed height: 6 ft 0 in (1.83 m)
- Listed weight: 212 lb (96 kg)

Career information
- High school: Pickerington North
- College: Northwestern (2013–2017)
- NFL draft: 2018: undrafted

Career history
- Tampa Bay Buccaneers (2018); San Francisco 49ers (2018); Philadelphia Eagles (2019)*; New York Jets (2019)*; Seattle Dragons (2020); Detroit Lions (2021); Seattle Seahawks (2022); Atlanta Falcons (2023); Pittsburgh Steelers (2023)
- * Offseason or practice squad member only

Awards and highlights
- Second-team All-Big Ten (2017)

Career NFL statistics
- Rushing attempts: 21
- Rushing yards: 122
- Receptions: 8
- Receiving yards: 63
- Return yards: 1,287
- Total touchdowns: 1
- Stats at Pro Football Reference

Godwin Eric Igwebuike (born September 10, 1994) is an American former professional football player who was a running back for six years in the National Football League (NFL). He played college football for the Northwestern Wildcats as a safety.

== Early life ==
Godwin Eric Igwebuike was born on September 10, 1994, in Pickerington, Ohio. He attended Pickerington High School North.

== College career ==
Igwebuike played college football for the Wildcats at Northwestern University as a safety from 2013 to 2017. He recorded college career totals of 324 tackles, seven interceptions, 31 pass breakups, three forced fumbles, and three fumble recoveries.

== Professional career ==
Pre-draft measurables
Height	Weight	Arm length	Hand span	40-yard dash	10-yard split	20-yard split	20-yard shuttle	Three-cone drill	Vertical jump	Broad jump	Bench press
5 ft 11 3/8 in (1.81 m)	213 lb (97 kg)	31 1/4 in (0.79 m)	9 3/4 in (0.25 m)	4.44 s	1.57 s	2.60 s	4.12 s	6.56 s	35.5 in (0.90 m)	10 ft 8 in (3.25 m)	19 reps
All values from NFL Combine

Igwebuike was signed by the Tampa Bay Buccaneers as an undrafted free agent on April 30, 2018. At this point in his career, he played safety. He was waived on September 1, 2018, and was signed to the practice squad the next day. He was promoted to the active roster on November 16, 2018. He was waived on November 26, 2018.

On November 27, 2018, Igwebuike was claimed off waivers by the San Francisco 49ers. He was waived on April 29, 2019.

Igwebuike was claimed off waivers by the Philadelphia Eagles on April 30, 2019. He was waived on August 2, 2019.

On August 4, 2019, Igwebuike was claimed off waivers by the New York Jets. He was waived on August 31, 2019.

Igwebuike was selected by the Seattle Dragons in the 2020 XFL Supplemental Draft on November 22, 2019. He had his contract terminated when the league suspended operations on April 10, 2020.

On January 14, 2021, Igwebuike signed a reserve/futures contract with the Detroit Lions. The Lions converted him to running back two weeks before training camp, and he made the active roster to start the season. He scored his first career touchdown on a 42-yard run on November 14, 2021, against the Pittsburgh Steelers. On August 30, 2022, Igwebuike was waived by the Lions.

On September 28, 2022, Igwebuike was signed to the Seattle Seahawks practice squad. On December 26, 2022, Igwebuike was signed to the Seattle Seahawks active roster.

On July 30, 2023, Igwebuike signed with the Atlanta Falcons. He was waived on August 29, 2023, and re-signed to the practice squad. He was promoted to the active roster on September 9, 2023. He was waived on September 11 and re-signed to the practice squad.

On September 20, 2023, Igwebuike was signed by the Steelers off the Falcons practice squad.

On September 10, 2024, Igwebuike announced his retirement from the NFL via Instagram after spending the offseason in free agency.

== Career statistics ==
=== NFL ===
Year	Team	GP	Rushing					Receiving					Returning					Tackles		
Year	Team	GP	Att	Yds	Avg	Lng	TD	Rec	Yds	Avg	Lng	TD	Ret	Yds	Avg	Lng	TD	Cmb	Solo	Ast
2018	TB	1	–	–	–	–	–	–	–	–	–	–	–	–		–	–	1	0	1
2018	SF	5	–	–	–	–	–	–	–	–	–	–	–	–		–	–	1	1	0
2021	DET	17	18	118	6.6	42	1	7	60	8.6	18	0	28	697	24.9	47	0	7	4	3
2022	SEA	5	3	4	1.3	4	0	1	3	3.0	3	0	11	308	28.0	50	0	3	1	2
2023	ATL	2	–	–	–	–	–	–	–	–	–	–	–	–		–	–	–	–	–
2023	PIT	10	–	–	–	–	–	–	–	–	–	–	11	282	25.6	36	0	–	–	–
Career		40	21	122	5.8	42	1	8	63	7.9	18	0	50	1,287	25.7	50	0	12	6	6

=== College ===
Year	Team	Games		Tackles				Interceptions				Fumbles		
Year	Team	GP	GS	Total	Solo	Ast	Sack	PD	Int	Yds	TD	FF	FR	TD
2013	Northwestern	0	0	DNP										
2014	Northwestern	11	5	51	34	17	0.0	6	3	11	0	0	0	0
2015	Northwestern	13	13	87	51	36	0.0	5	0	0	0	1	1	0
2016	Northwestern	13	13	108	78	30	0.0	9	2	15	0	1	1	0
2017	Northwestern	13	12	78	51	27	0.0	11	2	6	0	1	1	0
Career		50	43	324	214	110	0.0	31	7	32	0	3	3	0

== Personal life ==
Igwebuike is married to Ari Igwebuike. Igwebuike is a Christian. His first cousin once removed is former NFL kicker Donald Igwebuike. Igwebuike is also a musician and has released a Christian single called "Long Nights". He also helps to host the Favor Farms Festival, a Christian music festival in his hometown.
