= Brian Peters (gridiron football) =

American football player (born 1988)

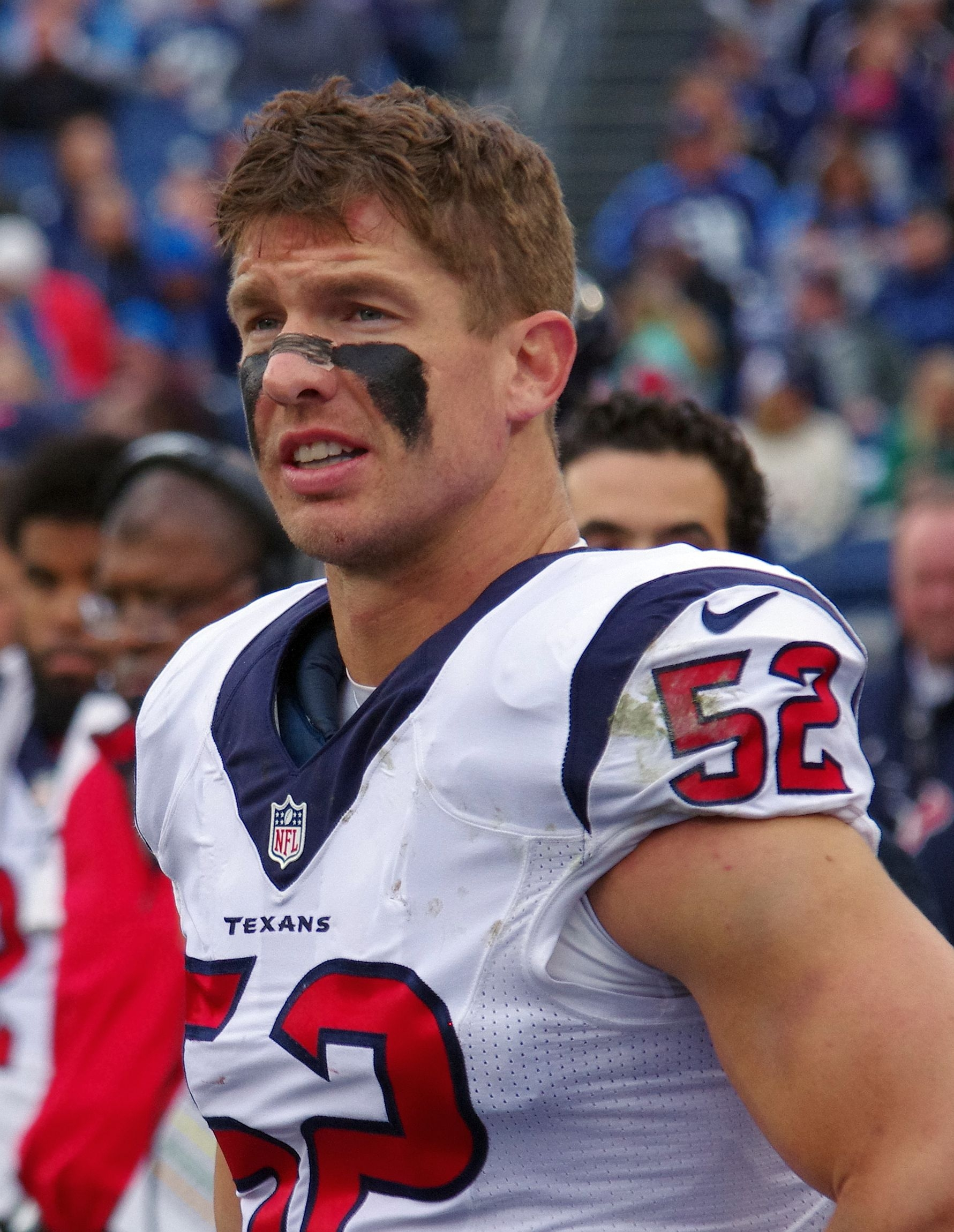
- Peters with the Houston Texans

No. 21, 27, 45, 52
- Position: Linebacker

Personal information
- Born: October 31, 1988 (age 38); Pickerington, Ohio, U.S.
- Listed height: 6 ft 4 in (1.93 m)
- Listed weight: 240 lb (109 kg)

Career information
- High school: Pickerington Central
- College: Northwestern
- NFL draft: 2012: undrafted

Career history
- Iowa Barnstormers (2012); Omaha Nighthawks (2012)*; Saskatchewan Roughriders (2012–2014); Minnesota Vikings (2015)*; Houston Texans (2015–2018); Team 9 (2020)*; Houston Roughnecks (2020)
- * Offseason or practice squad member only

Awards and highlights
- Grey Cup champion (2013); First-team All-Big Ten (2011); Second-team All-Big Ten (2010)

Career NFL statistics
- Total tackles: 54
- Stats at Pro Football Reference
- Stats at CFL.ca (archive)
- Stats at ArenaFan.com

Brian Edward Peters (born October 31, 1988) is an American former professional football player who was a linebacker in the National Football League (NFL) and Canadian Football League (CFL). He played college football for the Northwestern Wildcats. He was a member of the Saskatchewan Roughriders team in the CFL that won the 101st Grey Cup in 2013. Peters was also a member of the Iowa Barnstormers, Omaha Nighthawks, Minnesota Vikings, Houston Texans, and Houston Roughnecks.

== Early life ==
Peters attended Pickerington High School Central in Pickerington, Ohio, where he was a two-time first-team All-district, first-team All-county and first-team All-Ohio Capital Conference selection from 2005 to 2006, as well as a second-team All-state selection in 2006. He registered 127 tackles, 4 interceptions and 8 pass breakups as a senior, and also added 32 receptions (as a tight end) for 493 yards, helping the Tigers finish the 2006 season as the Division II state runners-up, regional champions and OCC champions. He also served as the Tigers' placekicker, booting 53-of-55 PAT's and 4-of-8 field goals. He finished his high school career with 277 tackles and 18 interceptions (7 in both 2004 and 2005). He was selected to play in the 2007 Ohio North-South All-Star game, as well as the OCC All-Star game.

Peters also lettered in baseball and track & field at Pickerington, where he was team captain in baseball, playing center fielder and pitcher. In track, he leaped 6.25 meters (20 feet, 5.25 inches) in the long jump event at the 2007 District Meet, and ran the 200-meter dash in 24.10 seconds. He also played one year of basketball.

Regarded as a two-star recruit by Rivals.com, Peters was ranked 75th among all players in the state of Ohio by SuperPrep.

== College career ==
Peters played for the Northwestern Wildcats from 2008 to 2011. He was redshirted in 2007. He recorded 92 tackles, five interceptions, one sack and two forced fumbles his senior season, earning First-team All-Big Ten as well as Academic All-Big Ten honors. Peters was also team co-captain his senior year. He accumulated 107 tackles, three interceptions and one forced fumble his junior year in 2010, garnering Second-team All-Big Ten as well as Academic All-Big Ten accolades. He played in 52 games, starting 34, during his college career, recording totals of twelve interceptions, six forced fumbles, 23 pass breakups and a school record setting 301 total tackles.

== Professional career ==
Pre-draft measurables
| Height | Weight | 40-yard dash | 10-yard split | 20-yard split | 20-yard shuttle | Three-cone drill | Vertical jump | Broad jump | Bench press |
|---|---|---|---|---|---|---|---|---|---|
| 6 ft 3 3/8 in (1.91 m) | 215 lb (98 kg) | 4.60 s | 1.60 s | 2.67 s | 4.20 s | 6.60 s | 32.0 in (0.81 m) | 9 ft 2 in (2.79 m) | 14 reps |
All values from Pro Day

=== Iowa Barnstormers ===
Peters signed with the Iowa Barnstormers of the Arena Football League on July 5, 2012. He recorded 13.5 tackles and one fumble recovery during his time with the Barnstormers.

=== Omaha Nighthawks ===
Peters was signed by the Omaha Nighthawks of the United Football League in 2012 and released by the team before the start of the 2012 season.

=== Saskatchewan Roughriders ===
Peters joined the Saskatchewan Roughriders' practice roster in 2012 and signed with the team in January 2013. The Roughriders won the 101st Grey Cup against the Hamilton Tiger-Cats on November 24, 2013. Peters had five special teams tackles during the game. Peters became the first player in Rider history and the fifth in CFL history to lead a team in tackles and special teams tackles in the same season.

=== Minnesota Vikings ===
On February 23, 2015, the NFL's Minnesota Vikings announced that they had signed Peters. He was released by the Vikings on September 5 and signed to the team's practice squad on September 6, 2015.

=== Houston Texans ===
Peters was signed off the Vikings' practice squad by the Houston Texans on September 30, 2015. He made his NFL debut on October 4, 2015, against the Atlanta Falcons. He recorded 17 special teams tackles in 2015, which tied for the league lead with Johnson Bademosi and Cedric Peerman. As of 2018, he is one of the Texans' six team captains due to his outstanding play on special teams.

On December 24, 2018, Peters was placed on injured reserve.

=== Houston Roughnecks ===
Peters signed with the XFL's Team 9 practice squad during the regular season. He signed with the Houston Roughnecks on March 9, 2020. He had his contract terminated when the league suspended operations on April 10, 2020.

== Personal life ==
Peters owns Chasing Edges Performance, a human performance company that provides breath work and mental skills consulting.
