= OhioHealth Pickerington Methodist Hospital =

Geography
- Location: 1010 Refugee Rd, Pickerington, Ohio, Ohio, United States
- Coordinates: 39°54′38″N 82°46′54″W

Organization
- Type: General

Services
- Beds: 96

History
- Former name: Pickerington Medical Campus (2015-2023)
- Founded: 2015
- Opened: December 6, 2023

Links
- Website: www.ohiohealth.com/pickerington-methodist-hospital
- Lists: Hospitals in Ohio

OhioHealth Pickerington Methodist Hospital is a, 220,000-square-foot (20,000 m^{2}), primary care hospital in Pickerington, Ohio. Pickerington Methodist is a member hospital of OhioHealth, a not-for-profit, faith-based healthcare system. It is located off Ohio State Route 256. Pickerington Methodist is the second ever full-service hospital to be built in Fairfield County, Ohio.

As part of the OhioHealth system of hospitals, Pickerington Methodist includes services such as 24-hour emergency department, intensive care beds and private rooms, women's health services (including obstetrics), Heart and Vascular (Diagnostic and Interventional Cath Labs), Acute Stroke Program, and more.

== Design and construction ==
OhioHealth introduced a ground-breaking technology known as Smart Room that combines digital whiteboards with conventional hospital services, marking a first-of-its-kind initiative in the Greater Columbus region. The Smart Room technology provides instant display of patient information on digital door signs as soon as a doctor or nurse wearing a specific badge approaches a room. Patients' televisions are paused to enable them to know who is about to enter their room. Moreover, the platform enables patients to access test results or have virtual consultations with specialists. Family members and friends can also connect remotely with the patient. These digital platforms are intended to improve patient education, provide updates on treatment progress, and offer meal options and entertainment, complementing the traditional nurse-call button system.

The hospital cost $140 million to construct. The hospital encompasses over 30 acres of what was unused property, stretching from the northern area of the former OhioHealth Pickerington Medical Campus.

== Services ==
Outpatient and inpatient services at Pickerington Methodist Hospital include:

- Cancer Care
- Women’s Health
- Trauma
- Heart and Vascular
- Pharmacy
- Neuroscience
- Orthopedics
- Surgery
- Imaging and Radiology
- Gastroenterology and Endoscopy
