= Caris LeVert =

American basketball player (born 1994)

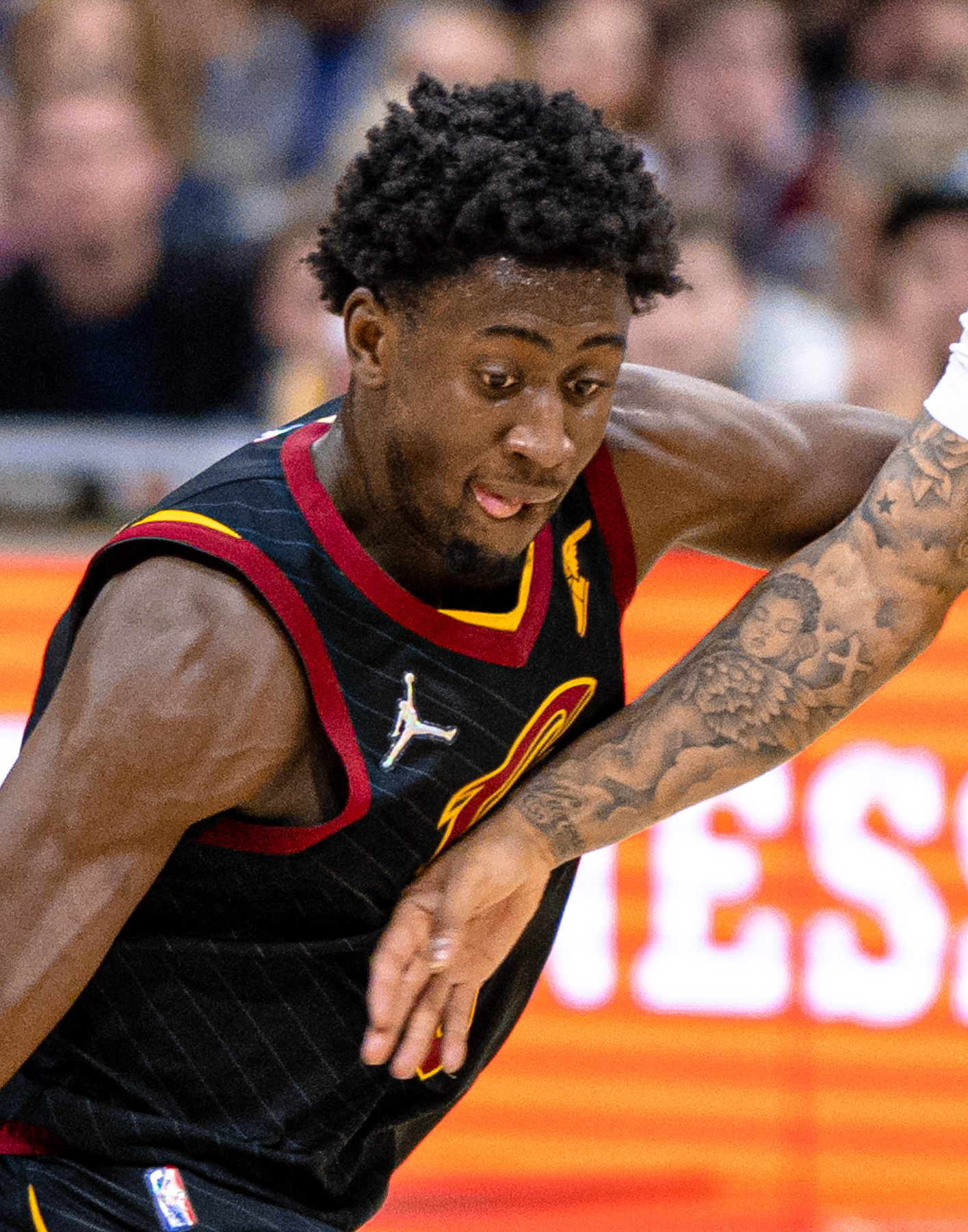
- LeVert with the Cleveland Cavaliers in 2022

No. 12 – Milwaukee Bucks
- Position: Shooting guard
- League: NBA

Personal information
- Born: August 25, 1994 (age 32) Columbus, Ohio, U.S.
- Listed height: 6 ft 7 in (2.01 m)
- Listed weight: 205 lb (93 kg)

Career information
- High school: Pickerington Central (Pickerington, Ohio)
- College: Michigan (2012–2016)
- NBA draft: 2016: 1st round, 20th overall pick
- Drafted by: Indiana Pacers
- Playing career: 2016–present

Career history
- 2016–2021: Brooklyn Nets
- 2021–2022: Indiana Pacers
- 2022–2025: Cleveland Cavaliers
- 2025: Atlanta Hawks
- 2025–2026: Detroit Pistons
- 2026–present: Milwaukee Bucks

Career highlights
- Second-team All-Big Ten (2014)
- Stats at NBA.com
- Stats at Basketball Reference

Caris Coleman LeVert (/ˈkɛərɪs ləˈvɜːrt/ KAIR-iss lə-VURT; born August 25, 1994) is an American professional basketball player for the Milwaukee Bucks of the National Basketball Association (NBA). He played college basketball for the Michigan Wolverines. LeVert was originally drafted by the Indiana Pacers but was traded to the Brooklyn Nets on draft night. He later played for the Pacers, Cleveland Cavaliers, Atlanta Hawks, and Detroit Pistons.

== Early life ==
LeVert grew up in Columbus but moved to Pickerington, Ohio in second grade. One of his teammates at Pickerington High School Central was future Ohio State forward Jae'Sean Tate. As a high school senior, he led Pickerington Central to a 26–2 record and the 2012 OHSAA Division I state championship. LeVert was a 2012 Associated Press All-Ohio Second Team high school basketball player and the 2012 Columbus Dispatch Metro Player of the Year for Pickerington High School Central. He was not heavily recruited in high school and his only official visit was to Alabama State. He committed to play basketball for John Groce and the Ohio Bobcats men's basketball program in November 2011. Meanwhile, when future teammates Mitch McGary and Nik Stauskas joined Glenn Robinson III by committing to Michigan in November 2011, Michigan became the fifth best recruiting class in the country.

When Groce got hired by Illinois Fighting Illini men's basketball in March 2012, LeVert got lost in the shuffle and decided to commit to Michigan. Ironically, Groce's 2011–12 Ohio Bobcats' upset of the 2011–12 Michigan team in the 2012 NCAA Division I men's basketball tournament was probably the reason that Groce was hired by Illinois and LeVert withdrew his National Letter of Intent to play for Ohio.

College recruiting
Name	Hometown	School	Height	Weight	Commit date
Caris LeVert; SG	Columbus, OH	Pickerington High School Central (OH)	6 ft 4 in (1.93 m)	175 lb (79 kg)	Dec 5, 2012
Caris LeVert; SG	Recruit ratings: Scout: Rivals: (87)				
Overall recruit ranking: ESPN: 67 (SG), 11 (OH)
Note: In many cases, Scout, Rivals, 247Sports, On3, and ESPN may conflict in their listings of height and weight.; In these cases, the average was taken. ESPN grades are on a 100-point scale.; Sources: "Michigan 2012 Basketball Commitments". Rivals.; "2012 Michigan Basketball Commits". Scout.; "ESPN". ESPN.; "Scout.com Team Recruiting Rankings". Scout.; "2012 Team Ranking". Rivals.

== College career ==
The 2011-12 Michigan Wolverines had been co-champions of the Big Ten, but lost both captains, Zack Novak and Stu Douglass, to graduation and three other players as transfers. The team was returning a nucleus of All-Big Ten players Trey Burke and Tim Hardaway Jr.

=== Freshman season ===
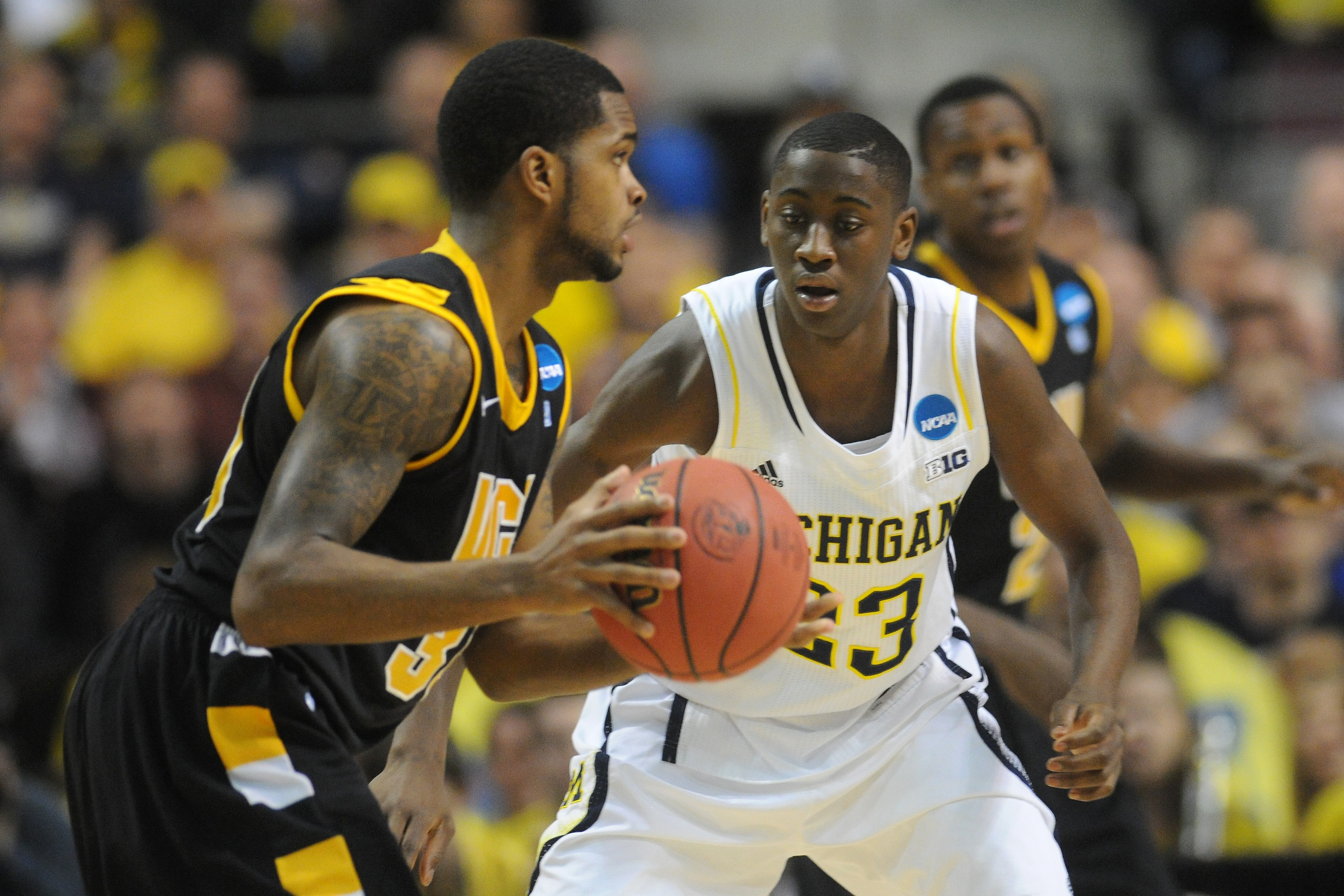
LeVert defending against VCU in the 2013 NCAA basketball tournament

LeVert arrived at Michigan weighing 162 pounds (73.5 kg). As a freshman, he began the year behind Stauskas, Robinson, Tim Hardaway Jr., and Matt Vogrich on the depth chart for the shooting guard/small forward positions and did not play in the first six games as a result. LeVert was a part of an incoming class that included McGary, Stauskas, Robinson, and Spike Albrecht. Eventually, Michigan head coach John Beilein decided that LeVert had value as a perimeter defender and decided to play him rather than redshirt him. On December 1 against Bradley Beilein juggled his lineup: Stauskas made his first career regular season start and LeVert saw his first action. By late December, LeVert became the one-on-one partner for Burke after practices. LeVert made his first start on December 29 against Central Michigan, when Tim Hardaway Jr. was unavailable. The 3 freshmen in the starting lineup—Robinson, Stauskas and LeVert—combined for 48 points, 12 rebounds and 8 assists. That night LeVert tallied 9 points and 5 assists. LeVert averaged 2.3 points in under 11 minutes of play per game. He never scored in double digits as a freshman, but he scored 8 points each in conference wins over Illinois and Michigan State as well as the 2013 NCAA Division I men's basketball tournament final four victory over Syracuse in 21 minutes of play.

=== Sophomore season ===
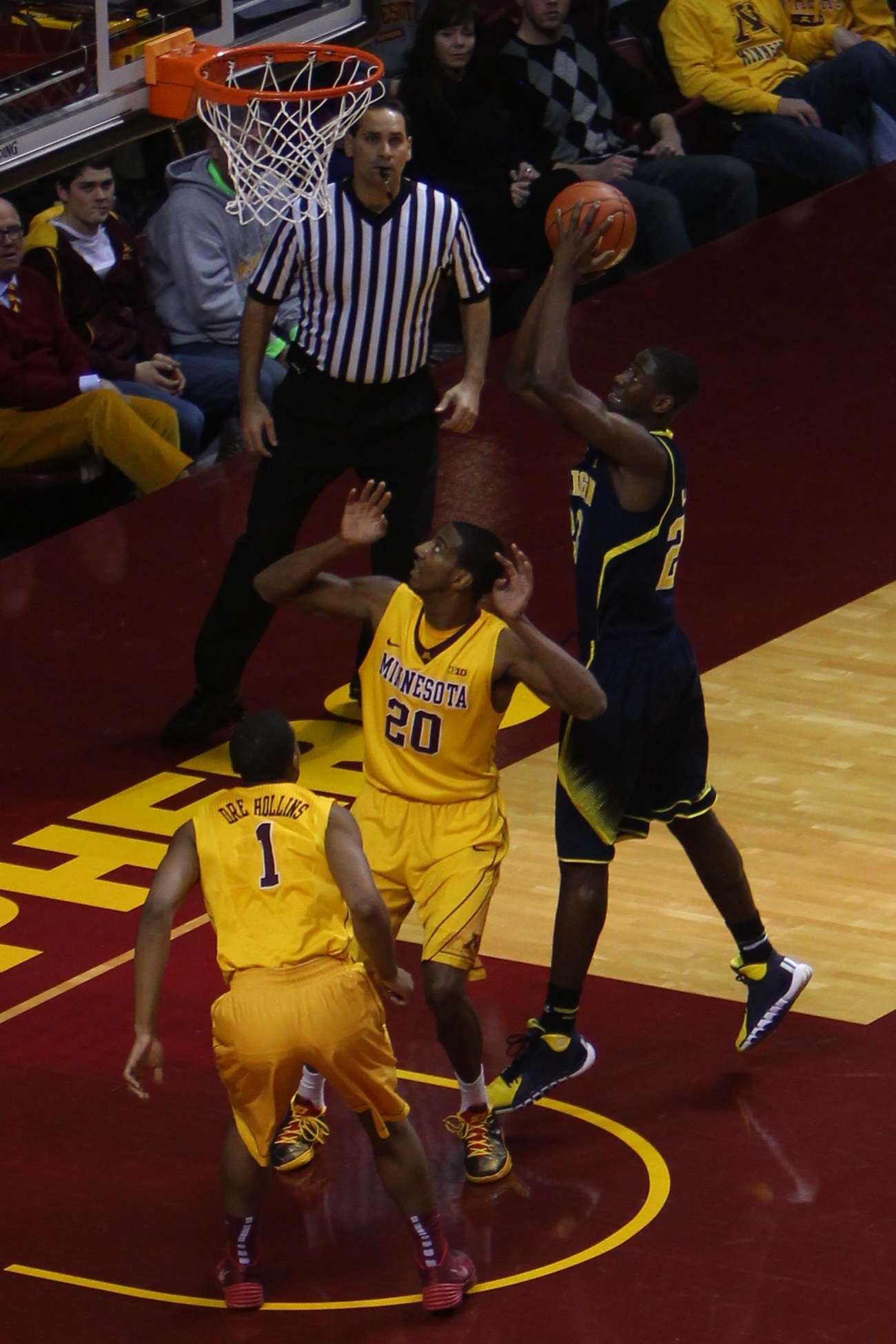
LeVert in the 2013–14 Big Ten season opener against Minnesota at Williams Arena

LeVert's classmates all made names for themselves as freshmen. During the Spring and Summer semesters (the offseason) of 2013 LeVert and Stauskas trained together on the court and in the weight room. He followed fellow Columbus native and National Player of the Year Burke as a key contributor to Michigan basketball as a sophomore. After opening the season with career-highs of 17 points and 5 rebounds on November 8 against UMass Lowell, he posted 24 points on November 12 against South Carolina State. When Michigan played (#10 AP Poll/ #8 Coaches' Poll) Duke in the ACC–Big Ten Challenge on December 3, LeVert again posted 24 points, including a 7–7 free throw performance. On January 18, Michigan defeated (#3 AP/#3 Coaches) Wisconsin at the Kohl Center for the first time since the 1998–99 team did so on February 27, 1999. It was the highest ranked team Michigan has ever beaten on the road. LeVert contributed a career-high 4 steals and 20 points. LeVert posted his first double-double on January 30 at home against Purdue with a career-high 11 rebounds and 14 points. On February 16, Michigan lost to (#21/21) Wisconsin, despite a career-high 25 points from LeVert. Michigan clinched its first outright (unshared) Big Ten Conference championship since 1985–86. He was a 2014 second team 2013–14 All-Big Ten selection (coaches and media). On March 11 LeVert was named to the all-District V (OH, IN, IL, MI, MN, WI) team by the United States Basketball Writers Association (USBWA). The 2013–14 team was eliminated in the elite eight round of the 2014 NCAA Division I men's basketball tournament by Kentucky. LeVert and teammate Stauskas, joined Julius Randle, Aaron Harrison and Marcus Lee on the All-Midwest Regional team.

On May 12, LeVert underwent surgery to repair a stress fracture in his foot. He was expected to be sidelined for 8–10 weeks, but be available for the team's August trip to play in Europe. LeVert returned to action just before the team's August 15–24 10-day, 4-game trip to Italy.

=== Junior season ===
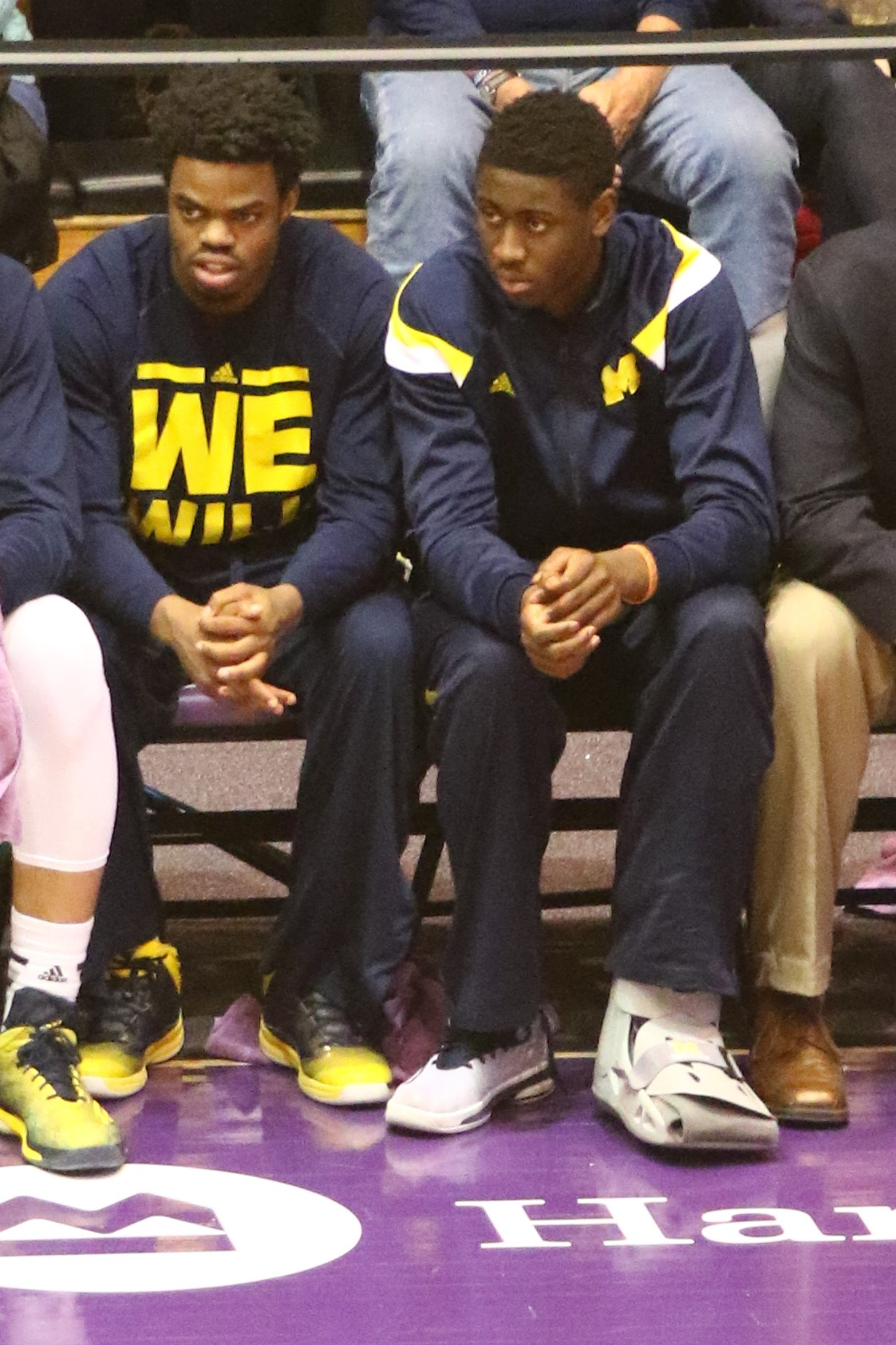
When Derrick Walton and LeVert were sidelined for the season in January 2015, the 2014–15 Wolverines began to struggle

Prior to the 2014–15 season, LeVert was named a first team All-Big Ten preseason selection along with Frank Kaminsky, Yogi Ferrell, Terran Petteway, and Sam Dekker. LeVert was selected by NBCSports.com to its Preseason All-American first team, by SB Nation, Blue Ribbon College Basketball Yearbook, Athlon Sports, Bleacher Report, Sports Illustrated, and CBSSports.com to their second teams and by USA Today to its third team. In its preseason top 100 player ranking, LeVert was listed at number 13 by ESPN. He was also listed as a John R. Wooden Award Preseason Top 50 candidate. LeVert also was named to the Oscar Robertson Trophy Watch List on November 24. He was also included in the early December Naismith Award top 50 watch list.

LeVert was named co-captain of the team along with Spike Albrecht. He opened the season with 9 assists against Hillsdale College on November 15, surpassing his previous career-high of five. On November 24, against Oregon, LeVert established a career high by making 11 free throws helping the team to a 70–63 victory in the Legends Classic semifinal game. He posted a career-high 32 points and tied a career-high 4 steals on December 6 in an upset loss to NJIT. He posted 4 steals again against Minnesota on January 10. On January 17 against Northwestern, he reinjured the foot that he had had surgery on the prior May and was lost for the season. At the time of his injury, LeVert led Michigan in scoring (14.9), rebounds (4.9), assists (3.7), steals (1.7) and minutes (35.8). LeVert was on crutches until early March and in a protective walking boot until early April.

LeVert had been expected to be a 2015 NBA draft selection, but following his injury some felt his draft stock was impaired. Following the season, he sought advice from the NBA Undergraduate Advisory Committee, but decided that he needed a second evaluation from them as the field of declared underclassmen became more clear with the thinking that "I don't think it really makes sense to (leave school) early and get drafted in the second round". On April 21, LeVert announced that he would return for his senior season. According to CBSSports.com's Sam Vecenie, this would give LeVert a chance to improve his pick and roll decision making, his midrange offensive game and his defense, especially against screens.

=== Senior season ===
Prior to the 2015–16 season, LeVert was named an All-Big Ten preseason selection, for the second straight year. LeVert became the fourth Wolverine to earn the award multiple times in their career, following Maurice Taylor, LaVell Blanchard and Manny Harris. He was also one of five All-Big Ten preseason selections according to the Big Ten Network. He was one of three Big Ten selections to the 20-man Jerry West Award preseason watchlist (along with James Blackmon Jr. and Rasheed Sulaimon) announced by the Naismith Memorial Basketball Hall of Fame. He was an Athlon Sports Preseason All-American 3rd team selection. In preseason top 100 player rankings LeVert was ranked 16 by ESPN and 23 by NBC Sports. He made the initial 50-man John R. Wooden Award watch list on November 17. On December 2, LeVert earned recognition on the 50-man Naismith College Player of the Year watchlist and 33-man Robertson Trophy watchlists.

After being sidelined for the final 14 games of the prior season for the 2014–15 Wolverines, LeVert began the season with a game-high 18 points and 5 assists as a starter against Northern Michigan. On November 16, against Elon, LeVert tied his career high with four steals. On December 5 against Houston Baptist, LeVert made his first start at point guard while Derrick Walton sat out due to a sprained ankle and posted 25 points and 8 rebounds. On December 8, Michigan lost 82–58 to (19/-) SMU as LeVert slumped on 1–13 field goal shooting and 3–6 free throw shooting. On December 15 against Northern Kentucky, LeVert posted 13 points, 10 rebounds and 10 assists, becoming the fourth player in Michigan program history to record a triple-double, and the 49th Wolverine to eclipse 1,000 career points. Based on his triple double against Northern Kentucky and a 19-point effort against Youngstown State, LeVert earned Co-Big Ten Player of the Week honors (along with Malcolm Hill) on December 21. On December 30, Michigan defeated Illinois 78–68 in its Big Ten Conference opener as LeVert posted a 22-point, 10-assist double-double. LeVert missed the January 2 game against Penn State with a lower left leg injury. At the time, he was the team leader in points, rebounds and assists.

On January 13, LeVert was one of four Big Ten athletes (along with Melo Trimble, Jarrod Uthoff and Denzel Valentine) among the 25 players included in the Wooden Award Midseason Top 25 Watch List. On the eve of LeVert's sixth missed game, head coach Beilein finally clarified that LeVert's left leg injury was not related to the two previous left foot stress fractures that LeVert had endured. On February 2, LeVert was one of two Big Ten athletes (along with Malcolm Hill) named one of 10 finalists for the Jerry West Award, despite having missed the last 8 of Michigan's 22 games. On February 10, Brendan F. Quinn of MLive.com broke the story that LeVert had been cleared to play. On February 13, Michigan defeated (#18/16) Purdue 61–56 with LeVert recording five rebounds and one assist in 11 minutes after missing the previous 11 games. On March 1, the team announced that the injury would end LeVert's season and collegiate career. On March 22, LeVert had a third surgical procedure in 22 months performed on his left foot in New York City by specialist Dr. Martin O'Malley. By late April, the draft stock of LeVert had slipped to the second round. According to the Michigan Basketball Twitter feed, he attended graduation in crutches at the end of April. He was invited to the May 11–15 NBA Draft Combine. While still on crutches at the combine, LeVert clarified that his injury was a Jones fracture of the fifth metatarsal and that Kevin Durant who has the same agency and used the same doctor had called to offer him encouragement.

== Professional career ==
=== Brooklyn Nets (2016–2021) ===
==== 2016–17 season ====
The day before the 2016 NBA draft, LeVert authored an open letter to NBA general managers to assure them of his resiliency in the face of all of his doubters due to his injury. On June 23, LeVert was selected with the 20th overall pick in the 2016 draft by the Indiana Pacers. He became Michigan's fifth first-round draft selection since 2013 and the fourth player drafted from Michigan's 2012 entering class. His rights were later traded to the Brooklyn Nets on July 7, in exchange for Thaddeus Young. Dr. O'Malley, who had performed LeVert's most recent foot surgery, was on the Brooklyn Nets medical staff at the time of the trade. On July 14, he signed his rookie scale contract with the Nets. LeVert missed the 2016 NBA Summer League as well as preseason and resumed practicing near the beginning of the regular season. He began the season sidelined and still rehabbing his injury. He was cleared to play on December 4. He made his professional debut on December 7 against the Denver Nuggets. Although he went 0-of-3 from the field, he posted 4 rebounds and 3 steals in 9 minutes of play, becoming the first Net to post 3 steals in his debut since Chris Childs in 1994. LeVert entered at the start of the second quarter and posted 3 steals and 3 rebounds in 5:15 of play before halftime. LeVert scored his first NBA points on December 10 against the San Antonio Spurs on a back door reverse layup assisted by Brook Lopez. LeVert posted double digit scoring for the first time with 12 points on December 30 against the Washington Wizards and former Michigan one-on-one training partner Burke's season-high 27 points. On February 3, Levert made his first NBA start against former Michigan teammate Robinson and the Indiana Pacers. On April 6 against the Orlando Magic, LeVert posted his first 20-point performance. Despite missing a large portion of the season, LeVert almost made the NBA All-Rookie team, finishing 12 in the voting for the 10-man team.

==== 2017–18 season ====
When Jeremy Lin was sidelined for the 2017–18 NBA season after the first game, it opened up playing time. After Allen Crabbe started game 2, LeVert entered the starting lineup for game 3 on October 22 against the Atlanta Hawks, posting 16 points, 6 rebounds, 4 assists and 3 steals. Coming off the bench on November 6 against the Phoenix Suns, he posted a 5-steal performance, while locking down Devin Booker so well that he frustrated Booker into fouling out. With injuries to point guards Jeremy Lin and D'Angelo Russell, coach Kenny Atkinson was impressed with LeVert rising to the challenge of learning a new position, earning the back-up point guard role to Spencer Dinwiddie. On December 7 (the first anniversary of his NBA debut), he had career highs in points (21) and assists (10) against reigning NBA MVP Russell Westbrook to lead the Nets to a 100–95 win over the Oklahoma City Thunder in Mexico City. Although his performance was highlighted by his first NBA double-double on offense, he was also praised for his 2-steal/2-block/5-rebound effort on defense against Westbrook. On December 27 against the New Orleans Pelicans, LeVert set another career high with 22 points. Two days later, he recorded 12 points and a career-high 11 assists in a 111–87 win over the Miami Heat. Then, LeVert had a few minor injuries (groin and knee) in January and February, that caused him to miss a total of 10 games over 3 separate stretches. On March 4, 2018, he had a 27-point effort in a 123–120 loss to the Los Angeles Clippers. Levert posted a career-high 12 rebounds along with 19 points on March 31, against the Miami Heat.

==== 2018–19 season ====
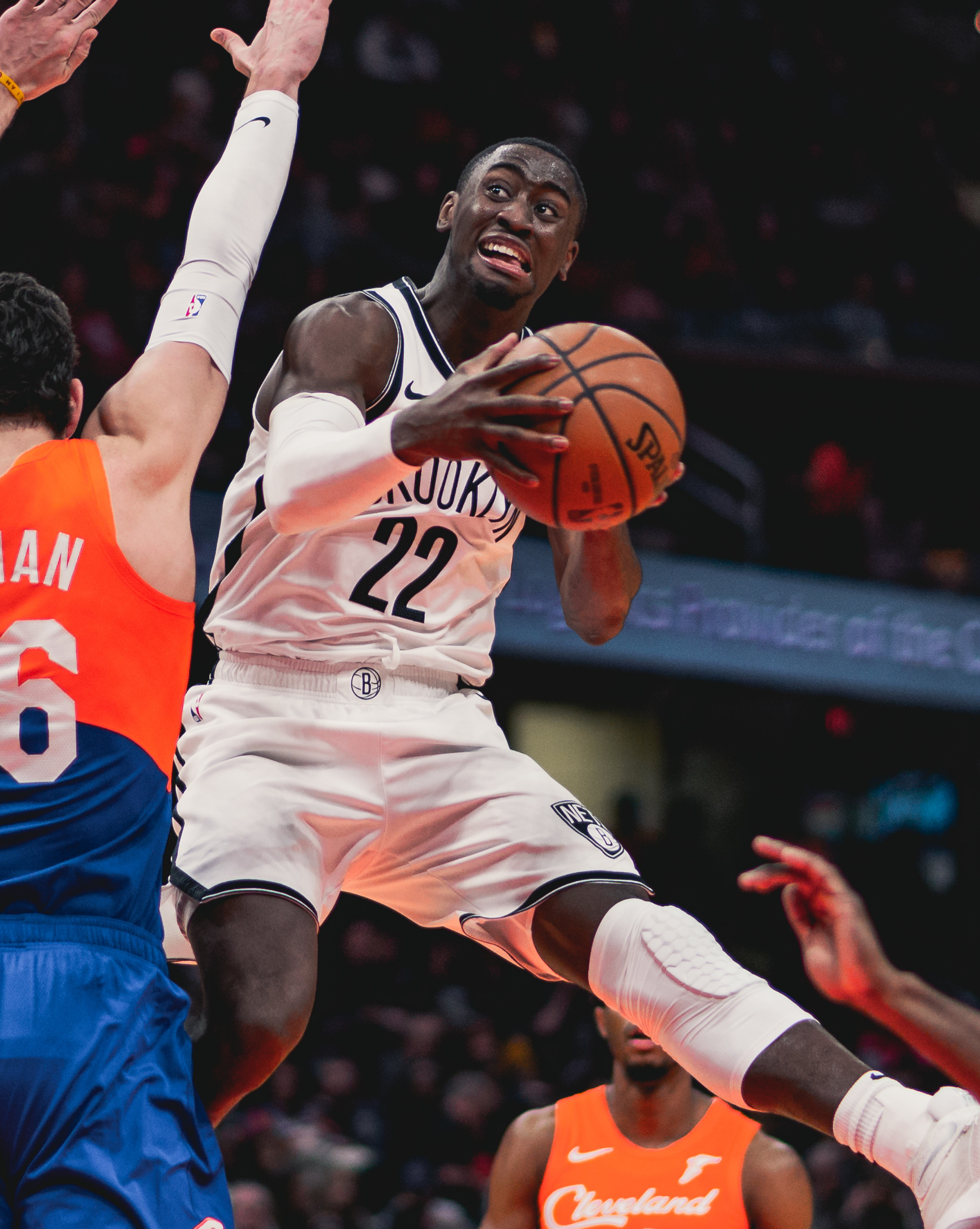
LeVert with the Nets in 2019

In the Nets' season opener on October 17, 2018, LeVert equaled a career high with 27 points in a 103–100 loss to the Detroit Pistons. Two days later, he set a new career high with 28 points in a 107–105 win over the New York Knicks. The 28 points included the winning basket over former Michigan teammate Tim Hardaway Jr. with 1 second left. He posted a new career high with 29 points on November 2 against the Houston Rockets. On November 9, he scored 17 points and hit a floater in the lane with 0.3 seconds left to lift the Nets to a 112–110 win over the Denver Nuggets. On November 12, LeVert suffered a severe right leg injury, later confirmed as a subtalar dislocation, late in the first half of the Nets' 120–113 loss to the Timberwolves in Minnesota. As the Nets' leading scorer, LeVert entered the game averaging a team-high 19 points per game. At the time of the injury, LeVert was the only player up to that point in the NBA season with more than one game-winning basket in the final 10 seconds of regulation or overtime. LeVert returned to action on February 8, 2019, after missing 42 games. He finished with 11 points in 15 minutes off the bench in a 125–106 loss to the Chicago Bulls. In game one of the Nets' first-round playoff series against the Philadelphia 76ers, LeVert scored 23 points in a 111–102 win.

==== 2019–20 season ====
On August 26, 2019, LeVert signed a three-year, $52.5 million contract extension with the Nets. On January 4, 2020, Levert returned from a thumb injury that had sidelined him since November 10 with 13 points against the Toronto Raptors. On February 3, Levert tied his career high with 29 points against the Phoenix Suns in his first start since his injury. When Levert set a new career high of 37 points on February 8 in a loss against the Raptors, it marked the first time that he had posted three consecutive 20-point games in his career. On the night he made his first 6 three-point shots, but missed his seventh attempt to win the game in the final seconds. On March 3, LeVert erupted for a career-high 51 points (his first 50-point game), including 37 in the fourth quarter and overtime, to lead the Nets to a 129–120 comeback win over the Boston Celtics. Two games later with Nets legend Julius Erving attending his first Brooklyn Nets game on March 6, LeVert posted his first triple-double (27 points, 11 rebounds and 10 assists) in a 139–120 win over the San Antonio Spurs.

==== 2020–21 season ====
On January 8, 2021, with Durant, Kyrie Irving, Dinwiddie and Tyler Johnson all sidelined, LeVert posted a career best 7 three-point shots on 9 attempts as part of a 43-point effort against the Memphis Grizzlies.

=== Indiana Pacers (2021–2022) ===
On January 16, 2021, LeVert was traded to the Indiana Pacers in a multi-player, four-team trade with the Cleveland Cavaliers and Houston Rockets that sent James Harden to Brooklyn and Victor Oladipo to Houston. LeVert was sidelined indefinitely after an MRI revealed a small mass on his left kidney. He said that the trade possibly saved his life as he was feeling 100% healthy. On January 25, 2021, LeVert underwent successful surgery to remove the mass, which was confirmed as being renal cell carcinoma. He was expected to have a full recovery and no further treatment was said to be needed. On March 13, LeVert returned to the court and made his debut for the Pacers, recording 13 points, seven rebounds and two assists in Indiana's 122–111 win over the Phoenix Suns.

=== Cleveland Cavaliers (2022–2025) ===
On February 6, 2022, LeVert was traded, along with a 2022 second-round pick (Luke Travers), to his hometown team the Cleveland Cavaliers in exchange for Ricky Rubio, a 2023 first-round pick (Ben Sheppard), a 2022 second-round pick (Andrew Nembhard), and a 2027 second-round pick. On February 9, LeVert made his Cavaliers debut, putting up 11 points off the bench in a 105–92 win over the San Antonio Spurs. On October 28, 2022, he scored a season-high 41 points during a 132–123 overtime win against the Boston Celtics. During this game, Donovan Mitchell also totaled 41 points, and the duo became the first pairing on the Cavaliers to each score 40+ in a game since LeBron James and Kyrie Irving did so in Game 5 of the 2016 NBA Finals.

On July 6, 2023, LeVert re-signed with Cleveland on two-year, $32 million contract. Although LeVert had previously posted 15 assists in the 2020 NBA Bubble during the 2020 NBA playoffs for Brooklyn against the Toronto Raptors, on February 28, 2024, he posted a (regular season) career-high as Cleveland lost to the Chicago Bulls in double overtime.

=== Atlanta Hawks (2025) ===
On February 6, 2025, LeVert, along with Georges Niang, three second-round picks, and two pick swaps were traded to the Atlanta Hawks in exchange for De'Andre Hunter. LeVert contributed 25 points off the bench including a game-winning buzzer beater against the Memphis Grizzlies on March 3. He posted his season high 31-point performance on April 11 against the Philadelphia 76ers.

=== Detroit Pistons (2025–2026) ===
On July 8, 2025, LeVert signed a two-year, $29 million contract with the Detroit Pistons, reuniting him with his former head coach from the Cavaliers J. B. Bickerstaff. He made 60 appearances for the Pistons during the 2025–26 season, recording averages of 7.4 points, 2.0 rebounds, and 2.7 assists. LeVert posted a season-high 24 points during the East Semifinals against the Cleveland Cavaliers.

=== Milwaukee Bucks (2026–present) ===
On July 7, 2026, LeVert alongside two future picks was traded to the Milwaukee Bucks in exchange for Gary Harris and Taurean Prince, as part of a six-team, 11-player trade.

== Career statistics ==
Legend
GP	Games played	GS	Games started	MPG	Minutes per game
FG%	Field goal percentage	3P%	3-point field goal percentage	FT%	Free throw percentage
RPG	Rebounds per game	APG	Assists per game	SPG	Steals per game
BPG	Blocks per game	PPG	Points per game	**Bold**	Career high

=== NBA ===
==== Regular season ====
Year	Team	GP	GS	MPG	FG%	3P%	FT%	RPG	APG	SPG	BPG	PPG
2016–17	Brooklyn	57	26	21.7	.450	.321	.720	3.3	1.9	.9	.1	8.2
2017–18	Brooklyn	71	10	26.2	.435	.347	.711	3.7	4.2	1.2	.3	12.1
2018–19	Brooklyn	40	25	26.6	.429	.312	.691	3.8	3.9	1.1	.4	13.7
2019–20	Brooklyn	45	31	29.6	.425	.364	.711	4.2	4.4	1.2	.2	18.7
2020–21	Brooklyn	12	4	27.8	.435	.349	.765	4.3	**6.0**	1.1	.5	18.5
2020–21	Indiana	35	35	**32.9**	.443	.318	**.822**	**4.6**	4.9	**1.5**	**.7**	**20.7**
2021–22	Indiana	39	**39**	31.1	.447	.323	.760	3.8	4.4	.9	.5	18.7
2021–22	Cleveland	19	10	29.8	.435	.313	.745	3.4	3.9	.8	.3	13.6
2022–23	Cleveland	**74**	30	30.2	.431	.392	.722	3.8	3.9	1.0	.3	12.1
2023–24	Cleveland	68	10	28.8	.421	.325	.766	4.1	5.1	1.1	.5	14.0
2024–25	Cleveland	38	3	23.8	.453	**.405**	.699	2.8	3.7	.9	.5	10.2
2024–25	Atlanta	26	0	26.6	**.482**	.338	.722	3.7	2.9	.9	.5	14.9
2025–26	Detroit	60	0	19.2	.417	.333	.679	2.0	2.7	.9	**.7**	7.4
Career		584	223	26.9	.436	.344	.733	3.6	3.9	1.0	.4	13.2

==== Playoffs ====
Year	Team	GP	GS	MPG	FG%	3P%	FT%	RPG	APG	SPG	BPG	PPG
2019	Brooklyn	5	2	28.9	**.493**	**.462**	.724	4.6	3.0	1.0	.4	**21.0**
2020	Brooklyn	4	**4**	**34.9**	.370	.429	.720	**6.0**	**9.5**	**1.3**	.3	20.3
2023	Cleveland	5	3	33.9	.429	.361	.615	4.6	2.6	.4	.2	15.0
2024	Cleveland	11	1	25.3	.431	.182	.654	3.6	2.3	.8	**.5**	10.1
2026	Detroit	**13**	0	16.6	.446	.370	**.900**	2.2	1.2	.6	**.5**	5.9
Career		38	10	24.9	.434	.350	.709	3.7	2.8	.8	.4	11.8

=== College ===
Year	Team	GP	GS	MPG	FG%	3P%	FT%	RPG	APG	SPG	BPG	PPG
2012–13	Michigan	33	1	10.7	.315	.302	.500	1.1	.8	.2	.1	2.3
2013–14	Michigan	**37**	**37**	34.0	.439	.408	.767	4.3	2.9	1.2	.3	12.9
2014–15	Michigan	18	18	**35.8**	.421	.405	**.810**	4.9	3.7	**1.8**	**.4**	14.9
2015–16	Michigan	15	14	30.9	**.506**	**.446**	.794	**5.3**	**4.9**	1.0	.2	**16.5**
Career		103	70	26.4	.434	.401	.770	3.5	2.7	.9	.2	10.4

== Personal life ==
LeVert is the son of Kim and Darryl Wayne LeVert and has a brother, Darryl Marcus, who is his junior by 11 months. His mother is a Columbus City Schools first grade teacher. His father, who was a graphic designer, died on April 4, 2010, at the age of 46. His brother, Darryl Marcus, played basketball for Connors State College. LeVert comes from a musical family as he is the third cousin of Eddie LeVert, the lead vocalist of the O'Jays. Eddie's sons include singers Gerald LeVert of LSG and LeVert (along with Sean LeVert). Caris was named after his grandfather, who was president of the Johnstown, Ohio school board.
