= A. J. Trapasso =

American football player (born 1986)

No. 4, 15
- Position: Punter

Personal information
- Born: February 6, 1986 (age 40); Pickerington, Ohio, U.S.
- Listed height: 5 ft 11 in (1.80 m)
- Listed weight: 225 lb (102 kg)

Career information
- High school: Pickerington Central (Pickerington, Ohio)
- College: Ohio State
- NFL draft: 2009: undrafted

Career history
- Tennessee Titans (2009)*; New York Jets (2009)*; Tampa Bay Buccaneers (2009)*; Tennessee Titans (2009)*; Denver Broncos (2010)*; Hartford Colonials (2010)*
- * Offseason or practice squad member only

Awards and highlights
- Mosi Tatupu Award (2006)

Albert Joseph "A. J." Trapasso (born February 6, 1986) is an American former football punter. He was signed by the Tennessee Titans as an undrafted free agent in 2009. He played college football at Ohio State.

In addition to the Titans, Trapasso was a member of the New York Jets, Tampa Bay Buccaneers, Denver Broncos, and Hartford Colonials.

== College career ==
Trapasso played college football at Ohio State. He was recruited from Pickerington High School Central after graduating in 2004. In 2006, Trapasso was awarded the Mosi Tatupu Award for the top Special Teams Player of the year. He finished his college career totaling 203 punt attempts for 8,317 yards in 51 games, 27 kickoffs with 10 touchbacks.

== Professional career ==
=== Tennessee Titans ===
After going undrafted in the 2009 NFL draft, Trapasso was signed by the Tennessee Titans as an undrafted free agent on April 30.

In his first professional appearance during the Hall of Fame Game on August 9, 2009, Trapasso ran a fake punt 40 yards for a touchdown against the Buffalo Bills. Later in the same game, he purposely ran backwards into the endzone resulting in a safety, running the clock out to win the game.

On August 21, 2009, during the third quarter of a preseason game with the Dallas Cowboys at Cowboys Stadium (the first Cowboys game in the new facility), Trapasso punted a ball that struck the bottom portion of the high definition "jumbotron" scoreboard. (He had also struck the jumbotron multiple times during pregame warmups). Officials ruled a replay of the down, but Trapasso's punt created an issue of first impression with future kicks and whether raising the scoreboard would be cost prohibitive. The NFL defined a re-kick rule after Trapasso's punt, but it was never enforced until a pre-season game on August 24, 2013, when Chris Jones hit the digital board again.

Trapasso was waived by the Titans during final cuts on September 4.

=== New York Jets ===
Trapasso was claimed off waivers by the New York Jets on September 6, 2009, replacing Reggie Hodges as the only punter on the roster. However, the team waived Trapasso just one day later and signed punter Steve Weatherford.

=== Tampa Bay Buccaneers ===
Trapasso was signed to the practice squad of the Tampa Bay Buccaneers on September 10, 2009. He was released by the team on September 14.

=== Tennessee Titans (second stint) ===
Trapasso was re-signed to the Tennessee Titans' practice squad on September 23, 2009, after Titans punter Craig Hentrich suffered a calf injury. He was released by the team on November 4.

=== Denver Broncos ===
Trapasso signed a future contract with the Denver Broncos on January 5, 2010. On June 15, 2010, Trapasso was cut by the Broncos.
