= Pickerington High School Central =

Public high school in Pickerington, Ohio

- Pickerington High School Central

Location
- 300 Opportunity Way; Pickerington, (Fairfield County), Ohio 43147; United States
- 39°52′34″N 82°45′20″W

Information
- Former names: Pickerington High School (1940 - 2003); Violet Township High School (1906 - 1939)
- Type: Public, Coeducational high school
- Established: 1991
- Sister school: Pickerington High School North
- School district: Pickerington Local School District
- Superintendent: Chris Briggs
- NCES School ID: 390468902690
- Principal: Roshawn Parker
- Teaching staff: 89.19 (FTE)
- Grades: 9–12
- Enrollment: ▼1,738 (2023–2024)
  - Grade 9: 453
  - Grade 10: 482
  - Grade 11: 381
  - Grade 12: 422
- Student to teacher ratio: 19.49
- Colors: Purple; White
- Athletics conference: Ohio Capital Conference
- Rivals: Pickerington North
- Feeder schools: Pickerington Ridgeview Junior High School
- Website: phsc.plsd.us

Pickerington High School Central (also known as Pickerington Central, Pick Central, or PHSC) is a public high school in Pickerington, Ohio, United States. It is one of two high schools in the Pickerington Local School District, serving grades 9–12. The school mascot is the Tiger.

== History ==
Construction of the current PHSC building was completed in 1991. In 2003, the district split the original Pickerington High School (founded 1940 - 2003) into two, creating Pickerington Central and Pickerington High School North. Prior to 1940, secondary education in the area was served by Violet Township High School (1906 - 1939), and earlier rural schoolhouses, such as the c. 1883 Pickerington School—now Heritage Elementary.

== Academics and student body ==
As of the 2023–24 school year, PHSC enrolled 1,738 students with a full-time equivalent teaching staff of 89.19 and a student–teacher ratio of 19.49:1.

== Athletics ==
PHSC competes in the Ohio Capital Conference and is a member of the Ohio High School Athletic Association. Its athletic rivals include Pickerington High School North, Reynoldsburg High School, and Lancaster High School.

The school offers athletic programs, including:

- Football
- Boys' and girls' Basketball
- Boys' and girls' Volleyball
- Wrestling
- Boys' and girls' Tennis
- Boys' and girls' Soccer
- Boys' and girls' Golf
- Boys' and girls' Cross country
- Cheerleading
- Track and field
- Baseball
- Softball
- Marching Band

=== Ohio High School Athletic Association State Championships ===
- Football – 2017, 2019
- Boys' Basketball – 2012, 2022
- Girls' Basketball – 1985, 1990, 1992, 1993, 1998, 1999, 2018, 2025
- Boys' Cross Country – 1997
- Boys' Track & Field – 2018, 2019, 2022
- Girls' Softball – 1997

==== Ohio Association of Secondary School Administrators Championships ====
- Competition Cheerleading - 2024, 2025

==== USA Today National Championships ====
- Girls' Basketball – 1999

== Pickerington High School Central Marching Tiger Band ==
The band has competed in the Ohio Music Education Association's State Marching Band Competition for many years, consistently reaching the finals, and earning the state's highest honor, a Superior rating.

The band has marched in over 25 nationally televised parades, including five appearances in the Rose Parade (the only band from Ohio to do so) and four appearances in Macy's Parade. The band has performed for three presidents and performed at 16 NFL halftime shows.

=== National parades ===
- The Philadelphia Thanksgiving Day Parade – 1983, 1986 & 2012
- The Dallas Cotton Bowl Parade – 1989
- The New York Macy's Thanksgiving Day Parade – 1990, 1995, 2001, 2009
- The Pasadena Tournament of Roses Parade – 1993, 1997, 2006, 2010, 2019
- The Miami King Orange Jamboree Parade – 1994 & 2000
- The Atlantic City Miss America Pageant Parade – 1994
- The Phoenix Fiesta Bowl Parade and National Band Championship – 1999, 2003 & 2014
- The New York City National Veteran's Day Parade – 2003, 2007 & 2023
- The Columbus Veteran's Day Parade – 2005, 2006 & 2008
- The Washington 25th Anniversary Celebration of the Vietnam Wall and Parade – 2007
- The Orlando Citrus Bowl Parade - 2016
- The London New Year's Day Parade - 2026
- The band was Grand Champion of the 1994 Miss America Parade, and led the 2001 Macy's Parade and the 25th Anniversary of the Vietnam Wall Parade. They placed third overall in the 2003 Fiesta Bowl Band Championship, and fifth in the 1999 Fiesta Bowl.
- The band has had professional football game appearances with the Cincinnati Bengals, Cleveland Browns, Buffalo Bills, Indianapolis Colts, New York Jets, and Philadelphia Eagles.
- Other performances include rallies for Senator John McCain (2008), Barack Obama (2008) President George W. Bush at the Nationwide Arena, President Ronald Reagan, President George H. W. Bush, Vice President James Danforth "Dan" Quayle, Senator Robert Dole, Governor George Voinovich and Mrs. Voinivich, Ohio Democratic Party Election reception, the Boy Scout National Council Meeting featuring Paul Harvey, OSU Skull session before the 2002 Washington State game, 2005 Northwestern game and the 2008 and 2012 Michigan Games, and the Columbus Dispatch OSU vs. Michigan Wigwam Pep Rally.
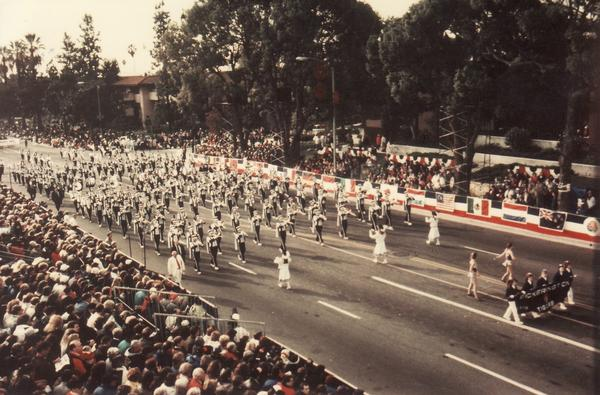
104th Tournament of Roses Parade, 1993

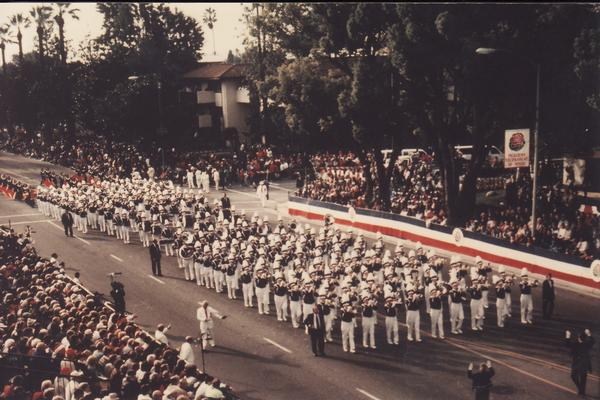
108th Tournament of Roses Parade, 1997

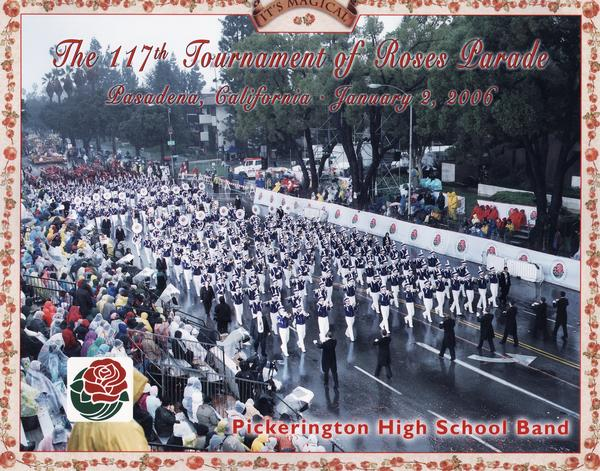
117th Tournament of Roses Parade, 2006

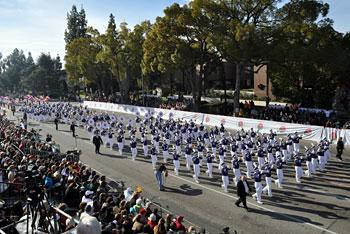
121st Tournament of Roses Parade, 2010

== Notable alumni ==
- Chazz Anderson, Class of 2007, football player
- Rasheem Biles, Class of 2023, football player
- Justin Boren, football player (transferred to Pickerington High School North)
- Zach Boren, Class of 2011, football player
- Shane Bowen, Class of 2005, football coach
- DeWayne Carter, Class of 2019, football player
- Taco Charlton, Class of 2013, football player
- DaVon Hamilton, Class of 2015, football player
- Ty Hamilton, Class of 2020, football player
- Caris LeVert, Class of 2012, basketball player
- Roger Lewis, Class of 2011, football player
- McKenzie Long, NCAA Champion sprinter
- Brian Peters, Class of 2007, football player
- Devin Royal, Class of 2023, basketball player
- Lorenzo Styles Jr., Class of 2021, football player
- Sonny Styles, Class of 2022, football player
- Jae'Sean Tate, Class of 2014, basketball player
- A.J. Trapasso, Class of 2004, football player
