= Jill Gray Savarese =

American actress (born 1969)

Jill Gray Savarase (born 1969) is an American actress best known for her role of "Faith" in the cult film Metamorphosis: Beyond the Screen Door, the first American feature film adaptation of Franz Kafka's short story The Metamorphosis.

Gray Savarese grew up in Pickerington, Ohio. After a career as an actress and fortune teller, she attended Yale University through a program for non-traditional students and completed her bachelor's degree in linguistics in 2003. She founded a business designing and selling women's handbags, which she sold in 2004. Additionally, she opened up an agency for American Sign Language interpreters. In this capacity, she interpreted for such notable people as Bill Clinton, Tony Blair, and Sonia Sotomayor.

Gray Savarese is vice president of a film distribution company. She is also a film producer and her production company Gray Savarese Films has produced several films, including Catching Up at IMDb, which premiered at the Sundance Film Festival.

Gray Savarese was producer on the feature film Tango Shalom at IMDb the production of which was blessed by Pope Francis and quoted in the Vatican newspaper, L'Osservatore Romano, "I was pleased to learn of the film, Tango Shalom, which is intended to foster the values of fraternal solidarity and peace on a global level... Upon all involved in the production of the film, I invoke abundant divine blessings".
