= Pickerington High School North =

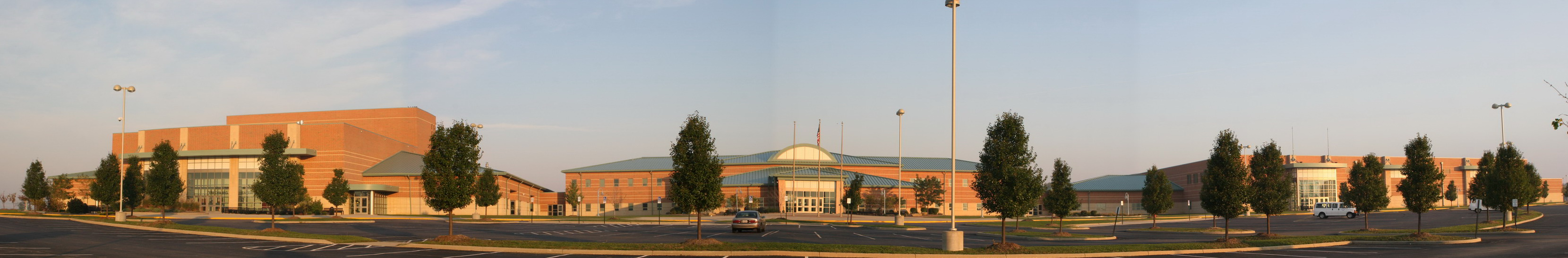
- Pickerington High School North

Location
- 7800 Refugee Road; Pickerington, (Fairfield County), Ohio 43147; United States
- 39°54′35″N 82°44′1″W

Information
- Type: Public, Coeducational high school
- Opened: August 24, 2003.
- Sister school: Pickerington High School Central
- School district: Pickerington Local School District
- Superintendent: Chris Briggs
- School code: 628945
- NCES School ID: 390468904605
- Principal: Mike Hudak
- Teaching staff: 89.54 (FTE)
- Grades: 9-12
- Enrollment: ▲1,761 (2024-2025)
- Student to teacher ratio: 19.67
- Campus type: Suburban
- Colors: Black, Purple, Silver
- Fight song: Panther Victory
- Athletics conference: Ohio Capital Conference
- Mascot: Panther
- Rival: Pickerington High School Central Gahanna Lincoln High School
- Publication: 2023-Present
- Newspaper: Panther Press
- Yearbook: Polaris
- Feeder schools: Pickerington Lakeview Junior High School
- Student Section: The Armada
- Website: phsn.plsd.us

Pickerington High School North (Pickerington North, North, Pick North, or PHSN) is a public high school in Pickerington, Ohio. It is one of two high schools in the Pickerington Local School District. The mascot is the Panther. In 2003, "Pickerington High School" split into two high schools, Pickerington High School Central and Pickerington High School North. Pickerington High School North opened on August 24, 2003.

== Athletics ==
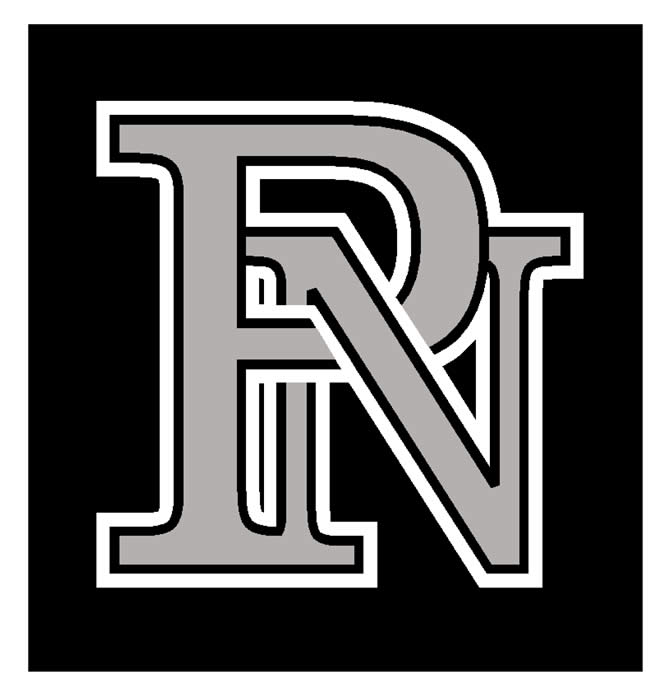
Pickerington North Athletic Logo

The school's sports programs include football, boys basketball, girls basketball, wrestling, boys tennis, girls tennis, boys soccer, girls soccer, boys golf, girls golf, cross country, cheerleading, track and field, Boys Volleyball, Girls Volleyball, Boys and Girls lacrosse, baseball, softball, marching band, and orchestra.

=== Ohio High School Athletic Association State Championships ===
- Baseball – 2016
- Girls Bowling – 2012 (Brittany Beeghley - state singles champion)
- Boys Track and Field – 2015, 2021
- Girls Wrestling - 2025

=== Ohio Association of Secondary School Administrators Championships ===
- Competition Cheerleading - 2025

== Pickerington North Band Program ==
The Pickerington North High School Band program has over 140 wind and percussion members who participate in various performing groups including the Pickerington High School North Marching band coined "The Marching Panthers". Other groups including the OMEA Class AA Symphonic Band, Class B Concert Band I, and Class C Concert Band II.

=== Marching Band ===
- OMEA State Marching Band Finals Qualifier - 2003–2021, 2025 (Festival class 2022-2024)
- OMEA State Marching Band Finals Superior Ratings - 2004–2021, 2025
- BOA (Bands of America) Central Ohio Bronze Medalists - 2019
- Yearly performances at the Ohio State University Buckeye Invitational
- 2003 Nations Parade, New York, NY
- 2005 Festival Disney Parade Marching National Champions, Orlando, FL
- 2005 Festival Disney Indoor Guard National Champions, Orlando, FL
- 2006 Tournament of Roses Parade, Pasadena, CA
- 2007 Fiesta Bowl Parade & National Band Championship, Phoenix, AZ - First Place Parade Marching (Class B)
- 2009 Citrus Parade, Orlando, FL
- 2011 NYC Veterans Day Parade, New York, NY
- 2013 Fiesta Bowl Parade, Phoenix, AZ - Grand Champion
- 2018 London New Year's Day Parade
- 2019 Tournament of Roses Parade, Pasadena, CA
- 2021 Festival Disney Parade Marching National Champions, Orlando, FL
- 2023 NYC Veterans Day Parade, New York, NY
- 2026 London New Year's Day Parade

=== Symphonic Band ===
- OMEA State Concert Band Qualifier - 2004–2007, 2009–2026
- OMEA State Concert Band Superior Ratings - 2005, 2009–2025
- 2014 PHSN Symphonic Band Performance at the Capital University Wind Band Invitational and Reading Clinic
- 2016 PHSN Symphonic Band Performance at the OMEA Professional Development Conference, Cincinnati, OH
- 2019 PHSN Symphonic Band Performance at the Capital University Band Festival, with Guest Composer, John Mackey
- 2025 PHSN Symphonic Band Performance at the OMEA Professional Development Conference, Cleveland, OH

=== Concert Band I ===
- OMEA State Concert Band Qualifier - 2007–2010, 2012–2026
- OMEA State Concert Band Superior Ratings - 2009, 2010, 2012, 2014–2025

=== Concert Band II ===
- OMEA State Concert Band Qualifier - 2010, 2011, 2014–2021, 2025, 2026
- OMEA State Concert Band Superior Ratings - 2017, 2018

== Notable alumni ==
- Tahnai Annis, Soccer player for the Philippines women's national football team
- Justin Boren, retired NFL offensive lineman
- Jake Butt, retired NFL tight end
- Alex Bayer, retired NFL tight end, special teams coordinator at Bowling Green
- Pat Elflein, Arizona Cardinals offensive lineman
- Godwin Igwebuike, Pittsburgh Steelers running back
- Jack Sawyer,Pittsburgh Steelers defensive end
- Spencer Sutherland, singer-songwriter
- Annette Echikunwoke, won the Olympic silver medal for Women's Hammer Throw in the 2024 Olympics representing the USA
