= Pickerington, Ohio =

- City
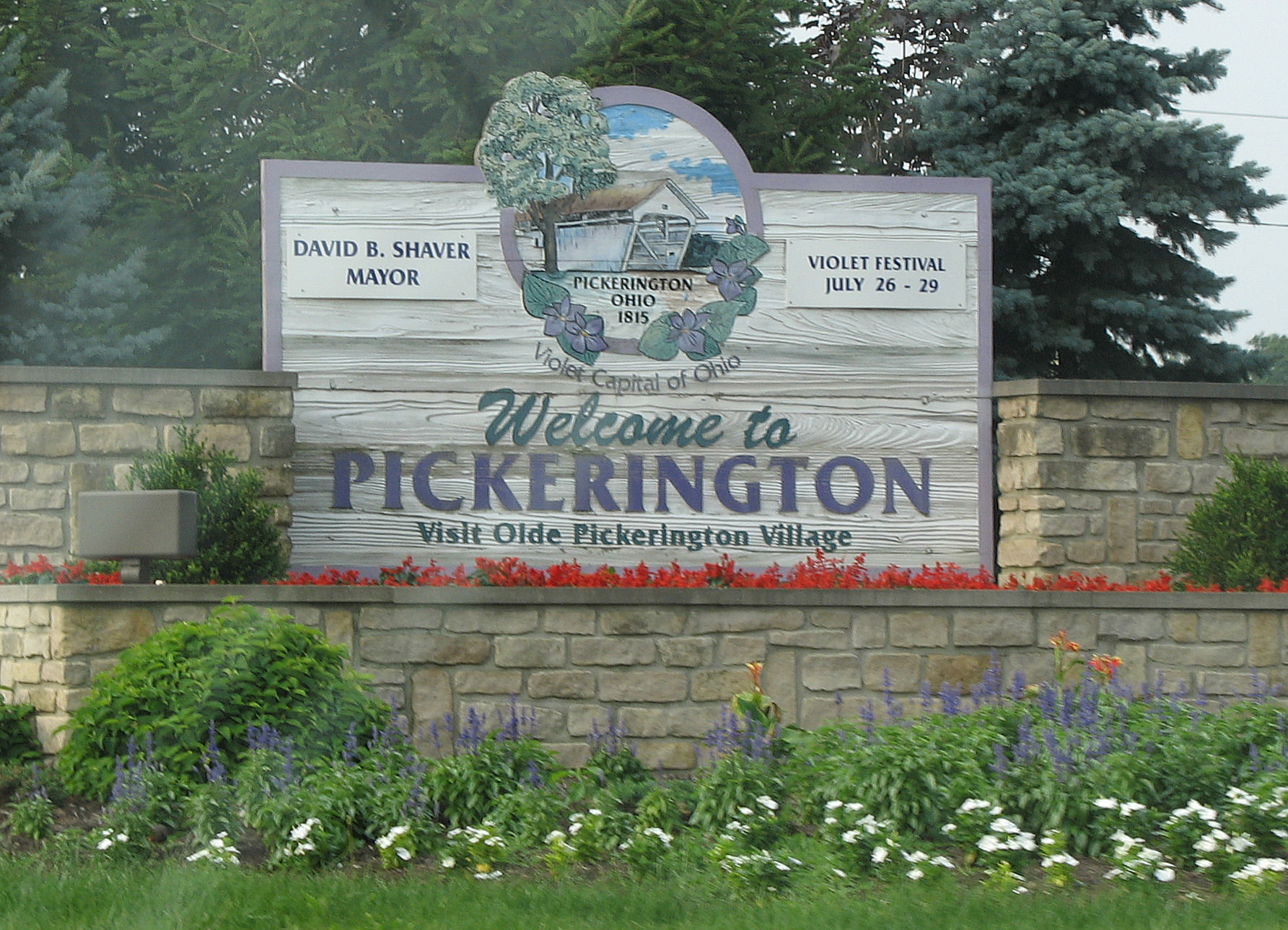
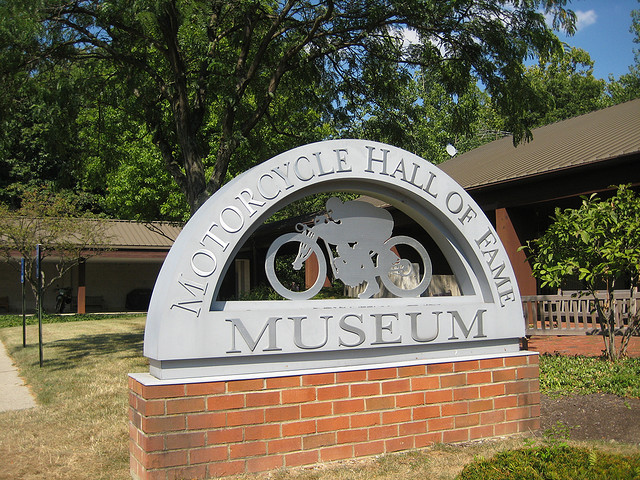
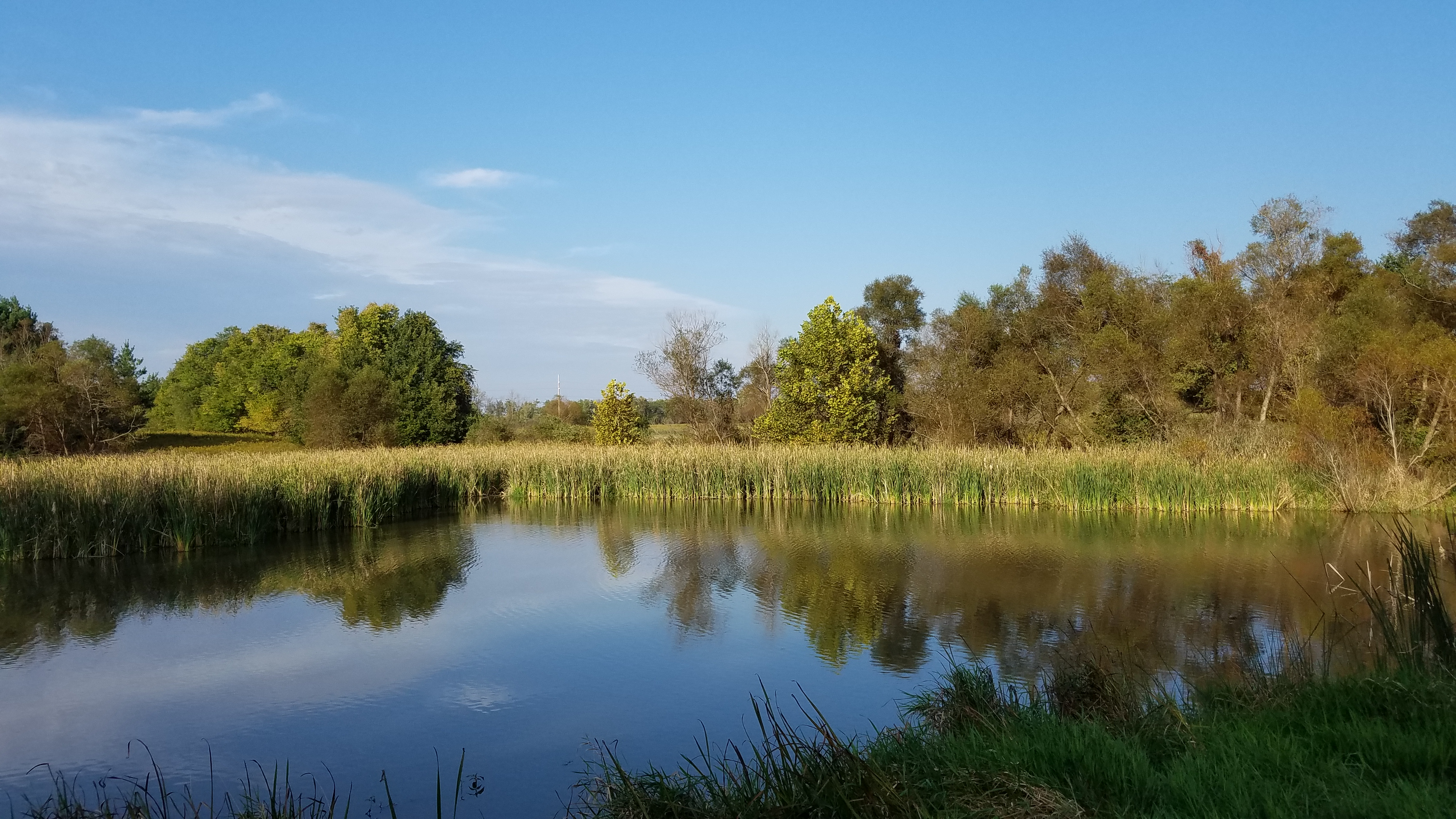
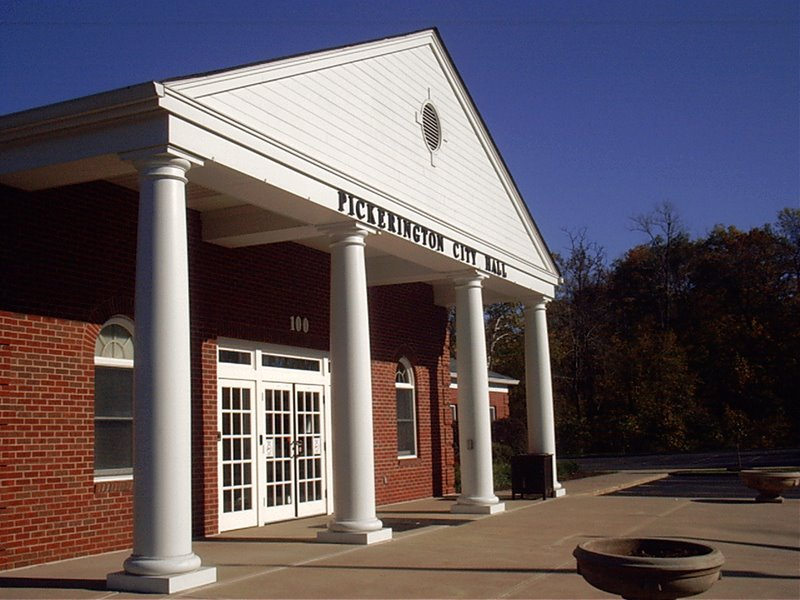
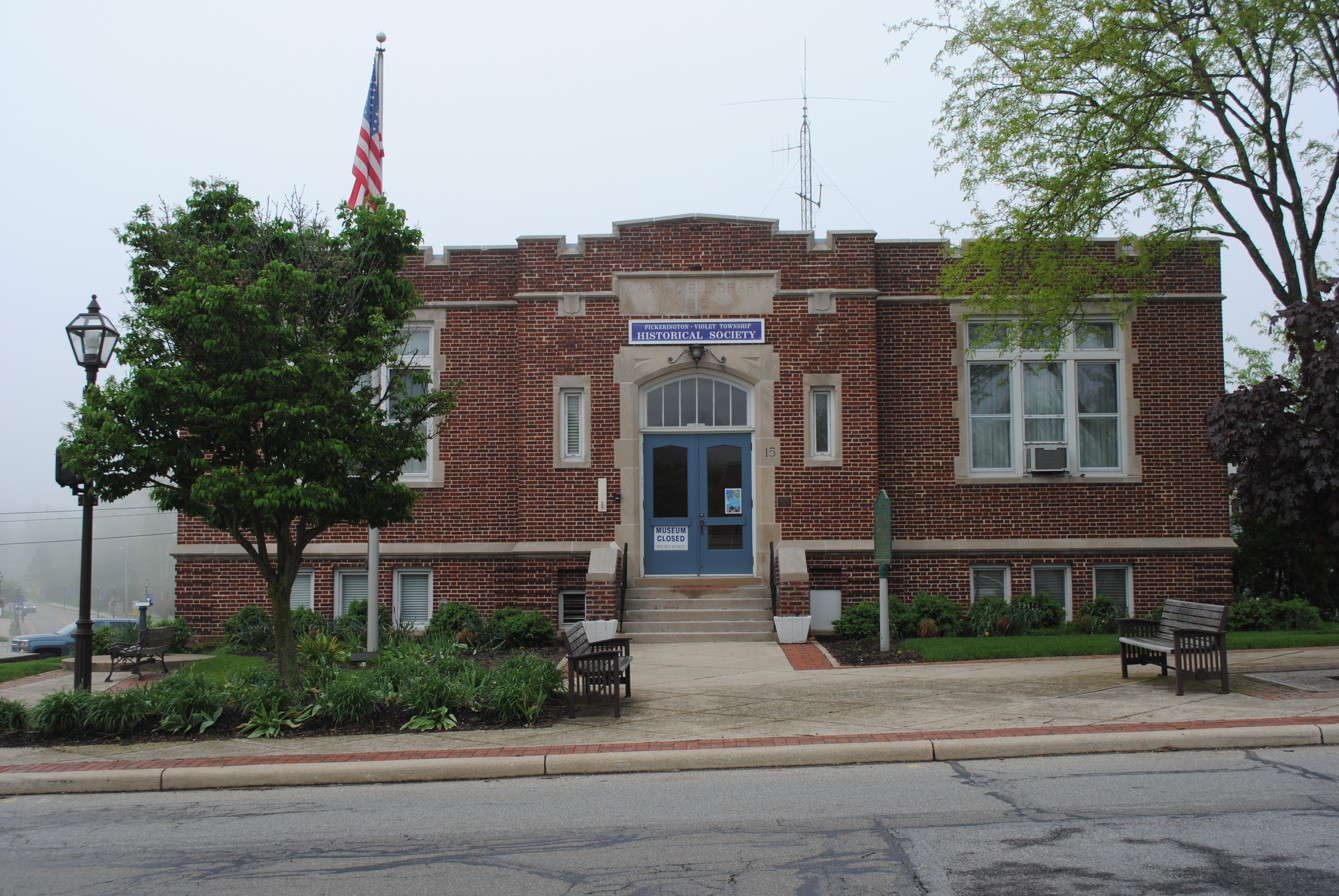
- The welcome sign located on Hill Road AMA Motorcycle Hall of Fame Museum Pickerington Ponds Metro Park City Hall in Olde Pickerington Village Old Carnegie Library now home to Historical Society.
- Nicknames: Picktown, Violet Capital of Ohio, The Purple City
- Interactive map of Pickerington, Ohio
- Location within Ohio Location within the United States
- Coordinates: 39°52′50″N 82°45′50″W
- Country: United States
- State: Ohio
- Counties: Fairfield, Franklin
- Founded: 1815

Government
  - Type: Mayor-council-manager
  - Mayor: Lee A. Gray
  - City Manager: Greg Butcher

Area
  - Total: 10.19 sq mi (26.40 km^{2})
  - Land: 10.19 sq mi (26.40 km^{2})
  - Water: 0 sq mi (0.00 km^{2})
- Elevation: 840 ft (260 m)

Population (2020)
  - Total: 23,094
  - Estimate (2024): 25,814
  - Density: 2,265.7/sq mi (874.79/km^{2})
- Time zone: UTC-5 (Eastern (EST))
  - Summer (DST): UTC-4 (EDT)
- ZIP code: 43147
- Area codes: 614, 380, 740, and 220
- FIPS code: 39-62498
- GNIS feature ID: 2396197
- Website: www.ci.pickerington.oh.us

Pickerington is a city in Fairfield and Franklin counties in the central region of the U.S. state of Ohio. It is a suburb of Columbus. The population was 23,094 at the 2020 census. It was founded in 1815 as Jacksonville, named after Andrew Jackson. The name was changed in 1827 in honor of its founder, Abraham Pickering. The city of Pickerington has experienced growth, mirroring the expansion of Columbus and the surrounding suburbs, driven by land annexation, development, and immigration to the area. Pickerington is home to the Motorcycle Hall of Fame, located off Interstate 70.

The Ohio Secretary of State certified Pickerington as a city in 1991 and it was designated as the "Violet Capital of Ohio" in 1996 by the Ohio Legislature. At 10.19 sq mi (26.4 km^{2}), Pickerington is the second-largest city in Fairfield County behind Lancaster. Pickerington is located just east of Columbus.

== Geography ==
According to the United States Census Bureau, the city has a total area of 10.19 square miles (26.39 km^{2}), all land.

== Demographics ==
=== 2020 census ===
As of the 2020 census, Pickerington had a population of 23,094, 7,914 households, 7,787 families, and 8,373 housing units.

The median age was 35.5 years; 29.3% of residents were under the age of 18 and 11.3% of residents were 65 years of age or older. For every 100 females there were 93.9 males, and for every 100 females age 18 and over there were 88.8 males age 18 and over.

Of the 7,914 households, 44.8% had children under the age of 18 living in them, 58.8% were married-couple households, 12.0% were households with a male householder and no spouse or partner present, and 23.0% were households with a female householder and no spouse or partner present. About 20.0% of all households were made up of individuals and 8.2% had someone living alone who was 65 years of age or older.

There were 8,373 housing units, of which 5.5% were vacant. The homeowner vacancy rate was 1.3% and the rental vacancy rate was 13.3%.

99.3% of residents lived in urban areas, while 0.7% lived in rural areas.

Racial composition as of the 2020 census
Race	Number	Percent
White	15,587	67.5%
Black or African American	4,550	19.7%
American Indian and Alaska Native	61	0.3%
Asian	951	4.1%
Native Hawaiian and Other Pacific Islander	7	0.0%
Some other race	335	1.5%
Two or more races	1,603	6.9%
Hispanic or Latino (of any race)	947	4.1%

Historical population
Census	Pop.	Note	%±
1850	157		—
1870	195		—
1880	188		−3.6%
1890	290		54.3%
1900	263		−9.3%
1910	310		17.9%
1920	358		15.5%
1930	366		2.2%
1940	384		4.9%
1950	433		12.8%
1960	634		46.4%
1970	696		9.8%
1980	3,917		462.8%
1990	5,668		44.7%
2000	9,792		72.8%
2010	18,291		86.8%
2020	23,094		26.3%
2025 (est.)	26,333		14.0%
US Census

=== 2010 census ===
As of the census of 2010, there were 18,291 people, 6,226 households, and 4,869 families living in the city. The population density was 1,877.9 inhabitants per square mile (725.1/km^{2}). There were 6,680 housing units at an average density of 685.8 per square mile (264.8/km^{2}). The racial makeup of the city was 80.1% White, 13.0% African American, 0.2% Native American, 2.9% Asian, 0.7% from other races, and 3.1% from two or more races. Hispanic or Latino of any race were 2.5% of the population.

There were 6,226 households, of which 50.7% had children under the age of 18 living with them, 61.8% were married couples living together, 11.5% had a female householder with no husband present, 4.8% had a male householder with no wife present, and 21.8% were non-families. 17.5% of all households were made up of individuals, and 5% had someone living alone who was 65 years of age or older. The average household size was 2.92 and the average family size was 3.33.

The median age in the city was 32.9 years. 33.3% of residents were under the age of 18; 6.6% were between the ages of 18 and 24; 31.5% were from 25 to 44; 22% were from 45 to 64; and 6.8% were 65 years of age or older. The gender makeup of the city was 48.6% male and 51.4% female.

=== 2000 census ===
As of the census of 2000, there were 9,792 people, 3,468 households, and 2,687 families living in the city. The population density was 1,317.4 inhabitants per square mile (508.7/km^{2}). There were 3,573 housing units at an average density of 480.7 per square mile (185.6/km^{2}). The racial makeup of the city was 93.18% White, 3.72% African American, 0.08% Native American, 1.38% Asian, 0.04% Pacific Islander, 0.41% from other races, and 1.19% from two or more races. Hispanic or Latino of any race were 1.35% of the population.

There were 3,468 households, out of which 48.5% had children under the age of 18 living with them, 65.3% were married couples living together, 8.9% had a female householder with no husband present, and 22.5% were non-families. 18.4% of all households were made up of individuals, and 4.4% had someone living alone who was 65 years of age or older. The average household size was 2.82 and the average family size was 3.25.

In the city, the population was spread out, with 32.7% under the age of 18, 6.5% from 18 to 24, 35.6% from 25 to 44, 19.8% from 45 to 64, and 5.4% who were 65 years of age or older. The median age was 33 years. For every 100 females, there were 97.2 males. For every 100 females age 18 and over, there were 92.6 males.

The median income for a household in the city was $63,664, and the median income for a family was $71,161. Males had a median income of $51,155 versus $31,850 for females. The per capita income for the city was $25,839. About 2.6% of families and 3.2% of the population were below the poverty line, including 3.6% of those under age 18 and 1.8% of those age 65 or over.

== Law and government ==
Pickerington uses the weak-mayor version of the mayor-council government, which constitutes an elected executive mayor position, an elected city council, and an appointed city manager position.

=== Mayor ===
The current mayor, Lee A. Gray, was elected in November 2011. Gray previously served as mayor from 1992 to 1999 and as a city council member in 1987.

=== City council ===
The Pickerington City Council is a seven-member body that is elected by rolling. There are four standing committees in the council: the finance committee, the rules committee, the safety committee, and the service committee.

=== Administration ===
There are several positions appointed between the mayor and city council to aid in the day-to-day management of the city.

=== Police department ===
The Pickerington Police Department, currently led by Chief Tod Cheney, is a 24/7 operation consisting of approximately 30 sworn personnel, 10 civilian dispatchers/records technicians, and 1 administrative assistant.

The police department is responsible for all police activities within the city and is made up of the patrol bureau and detective bureau.

== Education ==
Pickerington Local School District consists of 15 buildings: two high schools, one alternative high school, two junior high schools, three middle schools, seven elementary schools, and an early childhood learning center.

PLSD is made up of approximately 43.4% White, 33.3% African-American, 8.9% Asian, 6.8% Hispanic, .2% American Indian, and 7.4% multi-racial students. 40.9% of students are on a free/reduced lunch program. 15.0% are students with disabilities. The school district also has an average attendance rate of 93.4%.

=== Schools ===
High Schools (9–12)

- Pickerington High School Central
- Pickerington High School North
- Pickerington Alternative School

Junior High Schools (7–8)

- Pickerington Central Junior High School
- Pickerington Lakeview Junior High School

Middle Schools (5–6)

- Ridgeview Middle School
- Harmon Middle School
- Toll Gate Middle School

Elementary Schools (K–4)

- Fairfield Elementary
- Heritage Elementary
- Pickerington Elementary
- Violet Elementary
- Tussing Elementary
- Sycamore Creek Elementary
- Toll Gate Elementary

== Infrastructure ==
=== Healthcare ===
OhioHealth Pickerington Methodist Hospital is on Refugee road in Pickerington. In 2021 OhioHealth announced details of a six-story, 220,000 square foot hospital that includes additional cancer services to the Pickerington community. It opened in December 2023, OhioHealth Pickerington Methodist Hospital expanded the services of what was Pickerington Medical Campus to a full service hospital.

=== Parks and recreation ===
Pickerington Parks and Recreation Department oversees a vast expanse of parkland that spans over 158 acres, featuring a community pool and an array of amenities such as shelter houses, fishing ponds, basketball courts, softball fields, soccer fields, tennis courts, a putting green, playgrounds, swing sets, an arboretum, a covered bridge, sledding hills, a skate park, and an adult obstacle course.

=== Transportation ===
==== Local roads ====
The city's two main corridors are Hill Road (state route 256) which runs from Main Street in Reynoldsburg through to Olde Pickerington Village and Refugee Road which runs through the top of the city.

==== Highways ====
Pickerington has one highway running through it, Interstate 70, in the North of the city on the border of Reynoldsburg.

==== Rail history ====
In 1879, the first Toledo and Ohio Central Railroad (T&OC) train arrived in Pickerington after the completion of the railroad tracks and depot. The event marked the beginning of a growth period, with Pickerington's population expanding from 150 to 290 residents, and the township's population increasing from 1,220 to 1,970. For over fifty years, trains transported passengers to and from Pickerington, but with the rise of car ownership and paved roads, rail travel declined. In 1950, Pickerington's passenger service was discontinued, and the depot stopped handling freight traffic eight years later in 1958.

==== Public transit ====
Lancaster-Fairfield Public Transit has 2 bus routes in Pickerington. One is a loop the other connects to Lancaster and Carroll.

== Economy ==
According to the city's 2023 and 2024 Popular Annual Financial Report, the top employers in the city are:

2023 Top Employers
Employer	# of Employees
Pickerington Local School District	1,276
OhioHealth Corporation (Pickerington Methodist)	1,150
Kroger	369
Kohl's	289
Cracker Barrel Restaurant	238
Roosters Wings	237
ABRH, LLC.	155
McDonalds	146

2024 Top Employers
Employer	# of Employees
OhioHealth Corporation (Pickerington Methodist)	1,694
Pickerington Local School District	1,332
Kroger	371
Roosters	262
Cracker Barrel Restaurant	260
OhioHealth Physician Group	231
JPMorgan Chase Bank	228
Wendys	220

== Notable people ==
- Annette Echikunwoke, Olympic women's hammer thrower
- Alex Bayer, football player
- Justin Boren, football player
- Zach Boren, football player
- Shane Bowen, football coach
- Jake Butt, football player
- Taco Charlton, football player
- Pat Elflein, football player
- Lindsay Hollister, television actress
- Caris LeVert, basketball player
- Roger Lewis Jr., football player
- Earl Moore, baseball player
- Ogre 1 and Ogre 2, esport players
- Brian Peters, football player
- Arthur Raymond Robinson, Indiana senator
- Jill Gray Savarese, actress
- Brian Shaffer, Ohio State student who disappeared in 2006
- Lorenzo Styles Jr., football player
- Sonny Styles, football player
- Spencer Sutherland, singer-songwriter
- A. J. Trapasso, football player

== See also ==
- Pickerington Ponds Metro Park
