= Historic Crew Stadium =

Soccer Stadium in Columbus, Ohio

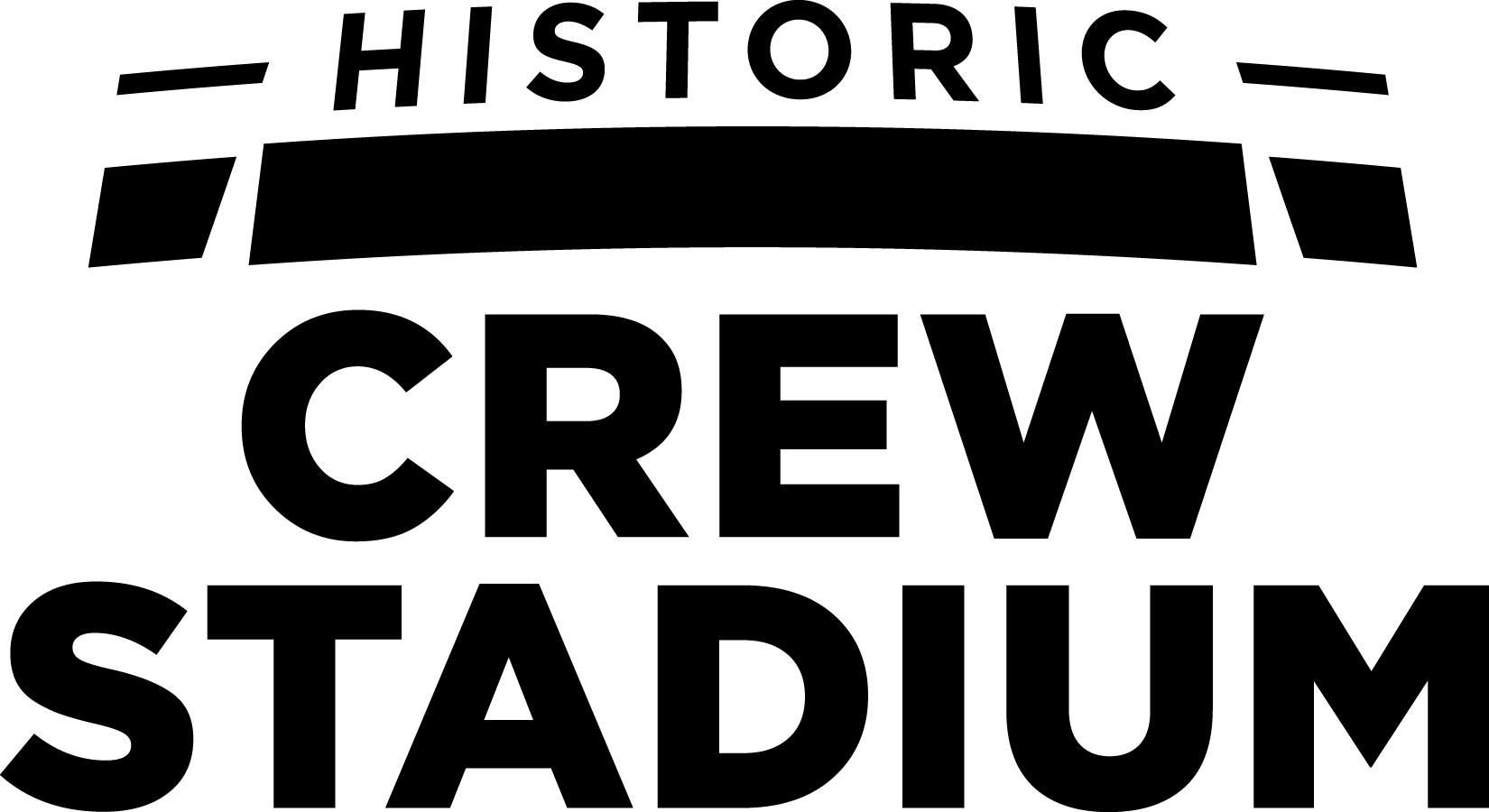

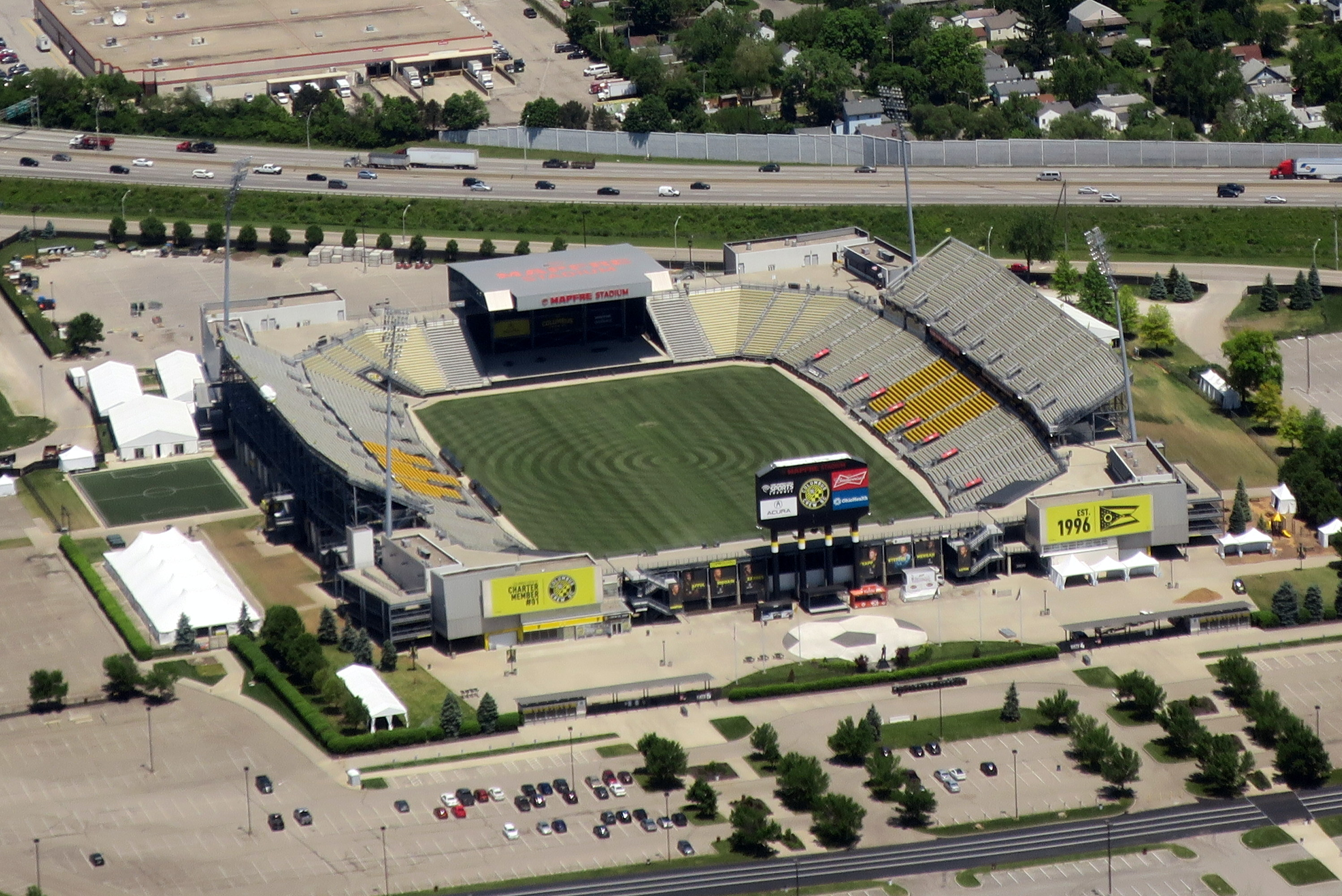
- Aerial view of the stadium, 2018
- Interactive map of Historic Crew Stadium
- Former names: Columbus Crew Stadium (1999–2015); Mapfre Stadium (2015–2020)
- Address: 1 Black and Gold Boulevard
- Location: Columbus, Ohio, United States
- Coordinates: 40°0′34″N 82°59′28″W
- Operator: Columbus Crew
- Capacity: 22,555 (1999–2008); 20,145 (2008–2015); 19,968 (2015–2021); 25,000–30,000 (concerts)
- Surface: Kentucky bluegrass (1999–2020); The Motz Group synthetic turf (2021–present)
- Field size: 115 × 75 yards

Construction
- Groundbreaking: August 14, 1998
- Opened: May 15, 1999
- Cost: US$28.5 million ($55.1 million in 2025 dollars)
- Architect: NBBJ
- Structural engineer: Korda/Nemeth Engineering Inc.
- General contractor: Corna/Kokosing Construction Co.

Tenants
- Columbus Crew 2 (MLSNP) 2022–present Columbus Aviators (UFL) 2026–present Columbus Crew (MLS) 1999–2021

Website
- historiccrewstadium.com

Historic Crew Stadium, previously known as Columbus Crew Stadium and Mapfre Stadium, is a soccer-specific stadium adjacent to Interstate 71 in Columbus, Ohio, United States. It primarily served as the home stadium of the Columbus Crew of Major League Soccer from 1999 until 2021, when the team moved to ScottsMiracle-Gro Field. Historic Crew Stadium is the current home of the Crew's training facility, the OhioHealth Performance Center and MLS Next Pro team Columbus Crew 2, as well as the Columbus Aviators in the United Football League (UFL). Historic Crew Stadium is also the site of a variety of additional events in amateur and professional soccer, American football, lacrosse, and rugby, and is a regular site for outdoor concerts due to the permanent stage in the north end zone.

Built in 1999, it was the first soccer-specific stadium built by a Major League Soccer team, starting an important trend in MLS stadium construction. The stadium was named for Madrid-based Mapfre Insurance after the company signed a 5-year sponsorship agreement announced on March 3, 2015. In December 2020, the deal expired and the Crew renamed the stadium. The listed seating capacity is 19,968. In 2015, Mapfre Stadium and Director of Grounds Weston Appelfeller were honored with the prestigious Field of the Year award by the Sports Turf Managers Association (STMA) for the professional soccer division.

== History ==
The Crew played their first three seasons at Ohio Stadium on the campus of the Ohio State University. During games, large sections of the stadium were blocked off to reduce capacity from approximately 90,000 to 25,243. Although the Crew enjoyed success at Ohio Stadium during their tenure there, the large seating capacity and limitations to the field size made the stadium ill-suited for soccer. Additionally, Ohio Stadium then required rented lights for night matches. These problems, along with planned renovations to Ohio Stadium, which began in 1999, were all factors in the development of Historic Crew Stadium. The construction cost of US$28.5 million was covered entirely with private funds from Crew owner and oil billionaire Lamar Hunt and his Hunt Sports group. It is located on the grounds of the Ohio Expo Center and State Fairgrounds, between East 17th Avenue and East Hudson Street. The site was previously home to Columbus Auto Parts, an OEM factory supplying the automobile industry, which stood vacant for decades between the Conrail railroad tracks and Interstate 71 before its demolition in the '90s.

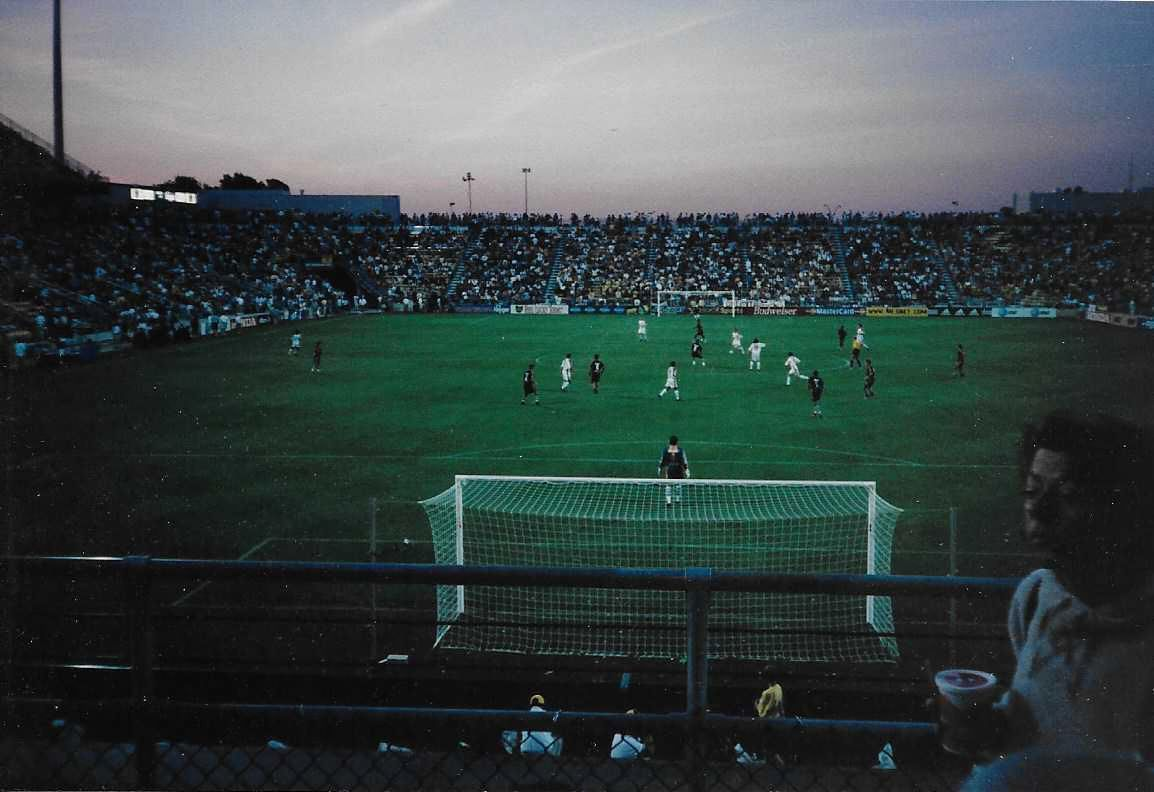
Columbus Crew Stadium inaugural match, Columbus Crew v New England Revolution, 15 May 1999

Historic Crew Stadium opened on May 15, 1999, as Columbus Crew Stadium with a match between the home side and the New England Revolution. It is the second soccer-specific stadium built in the country, after Steel Athletic Field was built in Bethlehem, Pennsylvania in 1913, and the first Major League Soccer stadium constructed in the United States. It has been credited with inspiring the wave of construction of soccer-specific stadiums throughout the league. In the 2010 Showcase issue of Stadia Magazine, Ian Nuttall stated "Who'd have thought when it opened in 1999 that Major League Soccer's first purpose-built stadium would kick-start the wave of dedicated soccer-specific stadiums that continue today?" The seating capacity was originally 22,555 until 2008 when construction of a permanent stage in the north end zone reduced seating capacity to 20,455, with room to expand to 30,000 total seats for concerts. As of 2023, the seating capacity for a soccer game is 19,968.

After nearly 15 years of the stadium not having a corporate sponsor, the Crew announced naming rights were sold to Madrid-based insurance company Mapfre on March 3, 2015. The team had been searching to sell stadium naming rights since it opened in 1999, but had been unable to come to an agreement.

== Events ==
In addition to hosting the Crew home games, Historic Crew Stadium has also hosted other Major League Soccer and professional soccer events. It was the site of the 2001 MLS Cup championship and was the host stadium for the Major League Soccer All-Star Game in 2000 and 2005. The stadium also hosted the U.S. Open Cup final on two occasions, in 1999 and 2002.

Both the United States men's and women's national teams have played numerous matches at Historic Crew Stadium, most notably, the 2002 FIFA World Cup qualifier in February 2001 between the U.S. and Mexico known as La Guerra Fria (The Cold War) due to sub-freezing temperatures. During the 2003 Women's World Cup, the stadium was one of the venues used during the group stage of the tournament. In 2018, Mapfre Stadium was one of three sites selected to host the SheBelieves Cup.

Historic Crew Stadium has also hosted events outside of professional soccer. The NCAA Division I Men's Soccer Championship was held at Crew Stadium in 2001 and 2003. In 2002, it hosted the Steinfeld Cup, the championship game of Major League Lacrosse. In June 2010, Historic Crew Stadium hosted the inaugural USA Sevens Rugby Collegiate Championship Invitational.

The venue was a regular site for Ohio High School Athletic Association state championship tournaments in soccer. In the local Columbus area, it is the site for the annual Westerville Football Classic, featuring the Westerville Central, Westerville North, Westerville South, and New Albany football teams. It has also been host to the local high school football rivalry of parochial schools Bishop Watterson High School and St. Francis DeSales High School.

In August 2025, the Mid-American Conference announced the 2025 and 2026 women’s soccer conference tournament would be held at the stadium.

2026 saw the first round of the SMX motocross playoffs hosted by Historic Crew Stadium. 250cc pro, 450cc pro, and SMX Next amateur races were held on September, 12. The skies opened up and the event turned into a mud race. In a classic 2 moto format, 250cc overall winner was Daxton Bennick, 450cc overall witnessed a breakthrough win by 450 rookie Haiden Deegan, and SMX Next amateur champion was Hideaway, TX own Kade Johnson.

== International soccer ==
=== 2003 FIFA Women's World Cup ===
The 2003 FIFA Women's World Cup was played in the United States. Historic Crew Stadium hosted several group game matches.

Date	Team #1	Result	Team #2	Round	Spectators
September 20, 2003	Germany	4–1	Canada	Group C	16,409
September 20, 2003	Japan	6–0	Argentina	Group C	16,409
September 24, 2003	Germany	3–0	Japan	Group C	15,529
September 24, 2003	Canada	3–0	Argentina	Group C	15,529
September 28, 2003	Sweden	3–0	Nigeria	Group A	22,828
September 28, 2003	North Korea	0–3	United States	Group A	22,828

=== U.S. women's national soccer team ===
Date	Teams	Competition
October 3, 1999	United States 5–0 South Korea	Friendly
September 28, 2003	United States 3–0 North Korea	2003 FIFA Women's World Cup Group A
May 17, 2011	United States 2–0 Japan	Friendly
October 30, 2013	United States 1–1 New Zealand	Friendly
September 15, 2016	United States 9–0 Thailand	Friendly
March 1, 2018	United States 1–0 Germany	2018 SheBelieves Cup
November 7, 2019	United States 3–2 Sweden	Friendly

=== U.S. men's national soccer team ===
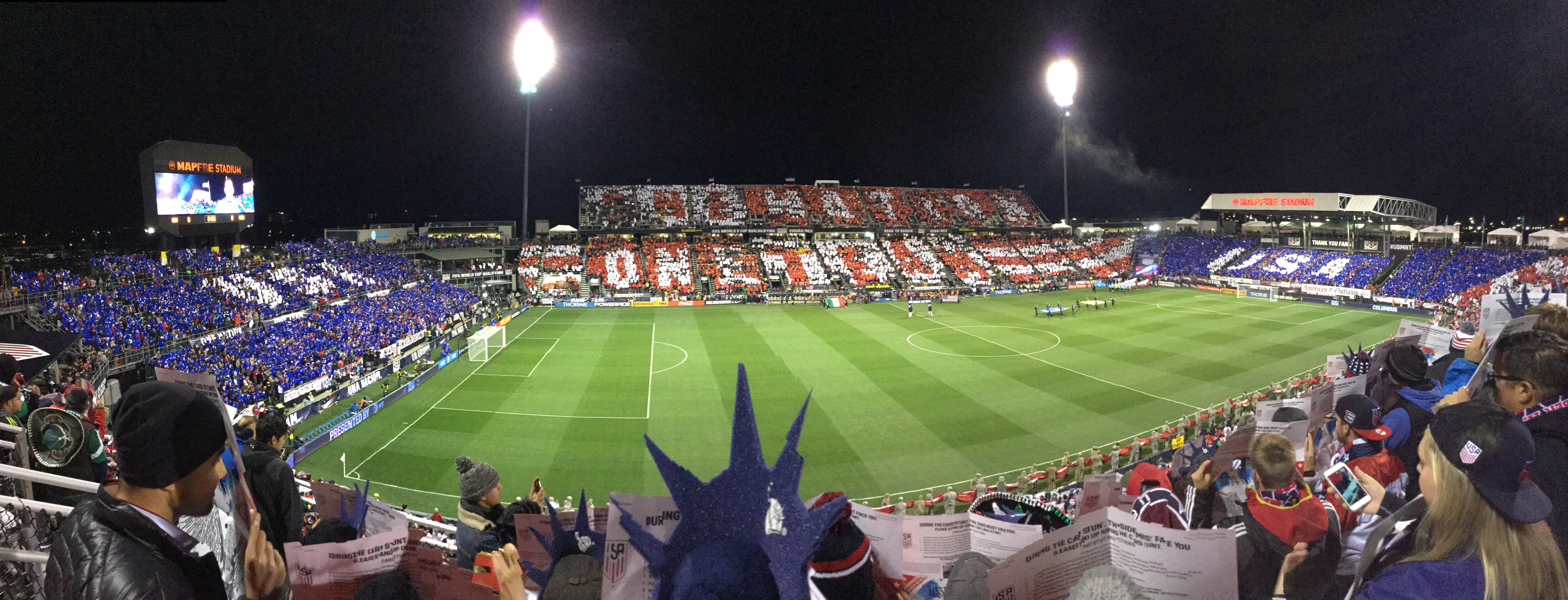
The crowd performs a card display prior to the 2018 World Cup qualifier between the United States MNT and Mexico on November 11, 2016

Since the opening of Historic Crew Stadium, it has been a regular site for the United States men's national soccer team matches, hosting ten games through 2013. The men's national team held an unbeaten record of 8–3–0 in all competitions, outscoring opponents 19–1. This was until the U.S. was beaten by Mexico on Veterans Day 2016.

The stadium has hosted five consecutive World Cup qualifying matches against Mexico, with the U.S. winning four of the five matches by the same score of 2–0 (with the U.S. fans adopting the rallying cry of dos-a-cero).

The national team was beaten by Mexico on November 11, 2016, by a score of 1–2, prompting Mexico's first ever win in Columbus, and the U.S.'s first World Cup qualifying defeat on home soil in 15 years. It hosted a 2018 FIFA World Cup qualifying match against Guatemala on March 29, 2016, which the US won, 4–0.

Date	Teams	Competition	Attendance
October 11, 2000	United States 0–0 Costa Rica	2002 FIFA World Cup qualification – CONCACAF semifinals	24,430
February 28, 2001	United States 2–0 Mexico	2002 FIFA World Cup qualification – CONCACAF final round	24,329
June 7, 2001	United States 0–0 Ecuador	Friendly	12,572
July 6, 2003	United States 2–0 Paraguay	Friendly	14,103
June 13, 2004	United States 3–0 Grenada	2006 FIFA World Cup qualification – CONCACAF second round	10,000
November 17, 2004	United States 1–1 Jamaica	2006 FIFA World Cup qualification – CONCACAF third round	9,088
September 3, 2005	United States 2–0 Mexico	2006 FIFA World Cup qualification – CONCACAF fourth round	24,685
February 11, 2009	United States 2–0 Mexico	2010 FIFA World Cup qualification – CONCACAF fourth round	23,776
September 11, 2012	United States 1–0 Jamaica	2014 FIFA World Cup qualification – CONCACAF third round	23,881
September 10, 2013	United States 2–0 Mexico	2014 FIFA World Cup qualification – CONCACAF fourth round	24,584
March 29, 2016	United States 4–0 Guatemala	2018 FIFA World Cup qualification – CONCACAF fourth round	20,624
November 11, 2016	United States 1–2 Mexico	2018 FIFA World Cup qualification – CONCACAF fifth round	24,650

== MLS Cup Finals ==
Since the opening of Historic Crew Stadium, it has hosted three MLS Cup Finals, once as a neutral site, and twice as Columbus Crew played host. The latter two occurred following a 2012 MLS rules change which did away with a neutral site for the Final, and instead has the club with the best overall regular-season record hosting the match.

Date	Teams	Competition	Attendance
October 21, 2001	LA Galaxy 1–2 San Jose Earthquakes	2001 MLS Cup Final	21,626
December 6, 2015	Columbus Crew SC 1–2 Portland Timbers	2015 MLS Cup Final	21,747
December 12, 2020	Columbus Crew SC 3–0 Seattle Sounders FC	2020 MLS Cup Final	1,500 (COVID-19 Pandemic restrictions)

== Concerts ==
The stadium hosts numerous concerts annually, most notably Rock on the Range, an annual festival of performances by rock bands that was held from 2007 to 2018, and replaced by Sonic Temple Art & Music Festival in 2019. Concerts by Rascal Flatts also closed out the Ohio State Fair in 2006, 2007, and 2009. A permanent stage, built in 2008, was constructed in the north end of the stadium to accommodate concerts after the closing of Germain Amphitheater. The addition replaced about 2,100 seats in the north end.

Date	Artist(s)	Opening act(s)	Tour	Tickets sold	Revenue	Additional notes
August 20, 2001	NSYNC	Amanda	PopOdyssey	—	—	
May 17, 2008	Stone Temple Pilots	—	2008 Reunion Tour	—	—	This concert was part of Rock on the Range.
July 29, 2008	Dave Matthews Band	Ingrid Michaelson	2008 Summer Tour	—	—	LeRoi Moore did not play due to injury.
May 23, 2009	Kenny Chesney	Lady Antebellum; Miranda Lambert; Sugarland	Sun City Carnival Tour	25,088 / 25,088	$1,943,542	
June 26, 2011	Kenny Chesney	Billy Currington; Uncle Cracker	Goin' Coastal Tour	20,321 / 25,657	$1,414,354	
August 5, 2011	Journey	Foreigner; Night Ranger	Eclipse Tour	—	—	This concert was part of the Ohio State Fair.
June 29, 2013	Kenny Chesney; Eric Church	Eli Young Band; Kacey Musgraves	No Shoes Nation Tour	27,571 / 27,571	$2,273,594	
September 14, 2014	Jason Aldean	Florida Georgia Line; Tyler Farr	Burn It Down Tour	26,350 / 26,350	$1,370,903	
May 17, 2015	Linkin Park	Of Mice & Men; Rise Against	The Hunting Party Tour	40,000 / 40,000	—	This concert was part of Rock on the Range.
June 16, 2018	Kenny Chesney	Thomas Rhett; Old Dominion; Brandon Lay	Trip Around The Sun Tour	26,455 / 27,207	$3,186,820	
August 17, 2021	Green Day; Fall Out Boy; Weezer	The Interrupters	Hella Mega Tour	—	—	
August 18, 2022	Kenny Chesney	Dan + Shay; Carly Pearce	Here and Now Tour	—	—	

=== Sonic Temple Art & Music Festival ===
Sonic Temple is a music festival for Rock music and Heavy metal music held at the venue. Approximately 175,000 people went in May 2025.

Year	Day	Temple Stage	Attendance
2019	May 17	System of a Down, Ghost	120,000
2019	May 18	Disturbed, Papa Roach	120,000
2019	May 19	Foo Fighters, Bring Me the Horizon	120,000
2023	May 25	Tool, Godsmack	
2023	May 26	Avenged Sevenfold, Queens of the Stone Age	
2023	May 27	Kiss, Rob Zombie	
2023	May 28	Foo Fighters, Deftones	
2024	May 16	Disturbed, Evanescence	138,000
2024	May 17	Misfits, Falling in Reverse	138,000
2024	May 18	Pantera, Staind	138,000
2024	May 19	Slipknot, Limp Bizkit	138,000
2025	May 8	Korn, Bad Omens	175,000+
2025	May 9	Metallica, Rob Zombie	175,000+
2025	May 10	Linkin Park, Incubus	175,000+
2025	May 11	Metallica, Alice in Chains	175,000+

== Post-Crew ==
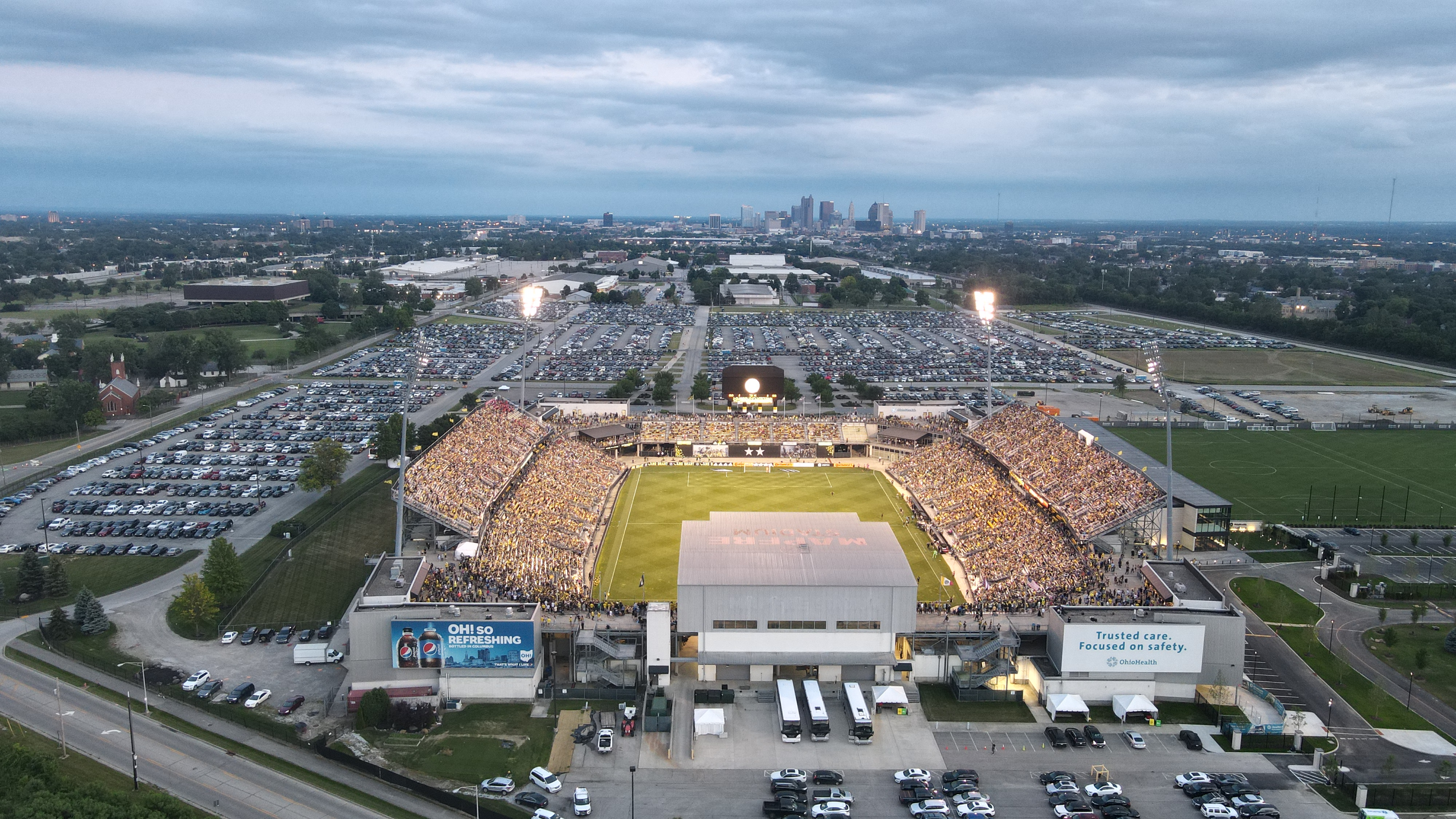
Aerial footage of the final Columbus Crew game at Historic Crew Stadium on June 19, 2021.

As part of the new ownership proposal for the Crew unveiled in 2018, the club announced plans to build a new stadium, eventually known as ScottsMiracle-Gro Field, west of the Arena District near Downtown Columbus. At the time of the proposal, the new stadium would seat 20,000 spectators and include 30 suites and 1,900 club seats. Construction on the new stadium began in October 2019. With the new stadium having opened on July 3, 2021, Historic Crew Stadium was to be redeveloped into the Crew's training center and community sports park, as well as a concert venue. The OhioHealth Performance Center training facility, incorporating the stadium itself, opened in June 2021.

As of 2020, a new authority owns Historic Crew Stadium and its adjacent city sports park, with the team continuing to control the stadium in terms of its use as a practice facility and their second-level team. The Crew played their final game at Historic Crew Stadium against the Chicago Fire FC, winning 2–0.

Starting in the 2022 season, the Crew's second-level squad, Columbus Crew 2, play in the stadium, with the first game on April 15, 2022, against Orlando City B.

On July 31, 2025, the United Football League announced plans to bring a team to the stadium for the 2026 season.

== Notes ==
- The stadium features a 384 ft^{2} (36 m^{2}) video board as well as 32 ft (10 m) of scrolling matrix board.
- It took 274 days from groundbreaking to the inaugural game (9 months, 1 day).
- The stadium facade is 48 ft (15 m) and its bleachers reach a height of 66 ft (20 m) Historic Crew stadium is built on a 15-acre (61,000 m^{2}) site.
- The first goal was scored by Jeff Cunningham during the inaugural game.
- The April 27, 2013, match against D.C. United at the stadium was delayed by 50 minutes after a fire broke out in a speaker cabinet on the south scoreboard. Firefighters controlled the blaze immediately, and the match went on as scheduled.

Events and tenants
Preceded by Ohio Stadium	Home of the Columbus Crew; 1999–2021	Succeeded by ScottsMiracle-Gro Field
Preceded by RFK Stadium; StubHub Center; CenturyLink Field	Host of MLS Cup; 2001; 2015; 2020	Succeeded by Gillette Stadium; BMO Field; Providence Park
Preceded by Kennedy Stadium	Host of Major League Lacrosse championship game 2002	Succeeded by Villanova Stadium
Preceded by Ericsson Stadium; Gerald J. Ford Stadium	Host of the College Cup; 2001; 2003	Succeeded by Gerald J. Ford Stadium; Home Depot Center
