= Kevin Martin (basketball, born 1975) =

American former basketball player (born 1975)

Personal information
- Born: August 2, 1975 (age 51)
- Listed height: 6 ft 5 in (1.96 m)
- Listed weight: 185 lb (84 kg)

Career information
- High school: Westerville North (Westerville, Ohio)
- College: Ohio State (1994–1995); UNC Asheville (1996–1999)
- NBA draft: 1999: undrafted
- Playing career: 1999–2000
- Position: Small forward
- Number: 12

Career history
- 1999–2000: Äänekosken Huima

Career highlights
- Big South Player of the Year (1999); 2× First team All-Big South (1998, 1999)

Kevin Gregory Martin (born August 2, 1975) is an American former basketball player. He was the Big South Conference Player of the Year in 1999 as a collegian at the University of North Carolina at Asheville and played professionally in Finland.

Martin, a 6'5" forward from Westerville, Ohio, teamed with Shaun Stonerook to lead Westerville North High School to the 1994 Ohio Division I state championship. From there, Martin committed to walk-on at nearby Ohio State University. As a walk-on, Martin played a bigger role than expected, averaging 16.1 minutes and 7.6 points per game and even started four games for the Buckeyes in the 1994–95 season. In the offseason, Martin chose to transfer to a school where he could expect more playing time, ultimately settling on UNC Asheville.

At Asheville, Martin enjoyed a standout career under coach Eddie Biedenbach. The Bulldogs won the Big South Conference regular season title in both 1997–98 and 1998–99, and Martin was named to the 1999 all-conference team after averaging 13.4 points and 5.2 rebounds per game. As a senior, Martin broke out, averaging 21.9 points per game to lead the conference in scoring. He repeated on the all-conference team and was honored as Big South Player of the Year. In his career, Martin scored 1,340 points in three seasons.

After going undrafted in the 1999 NBA draft, Martin played the 1999–2000 season with Äänekosken Huima in Finland. For the season he averaged 17.5 points and 6.3 rebounds per game.

He is currently the head boys basketball coach at Westerville Central High School in Westerville, Ohio and the former coach of Johnstown-Monroe High School in Johnstown, Ohio.
