= Cuyahoga County Public Library =

Library system in Greater Cleveland, Ohio

- Location: Greater Cleveland, Ohio
- Established: 1922
- Branches: 27

Collection
- Size: 2,839,767

Access and use
- Circulation: 10,716,155 (FY 2022)
- Population served: 589,000
- Members: 737,702 (FY 2022)

Other information
- CEO: Jamar Rahming
- Employees: 500+
- Website: http://www.cuyahogalibrary.org

Cuyahoga County Public Library (CCPL) has 27 branches that serve 47 communities in Cuyahoga County, Ohio. It was ranked the number one public library in the United States among libraries serving populations of more than 500,000 by the Hennen's American Public Library Ratings 2010. In 2022, more than 10 million items were borrowed by its 737,702 cardholders, and 2.99 million visits were made to branches.

In August 2023, Cuyahoga County Public Library switched to a new website and catalog provider, AspenDiscovery, that features a more powerful catalog search engine and allows users to personalize their experience, mostly by allowing users to post and read reviews, rate items, and utilize a new discovery feature based on similar reads.

Through SearchOhio, Cuyahoga County Public Library is connected to OhioLINK, which provides local access to the State Library of Ohio and 117 university and college libraries across the state. Cardholders have direct access to more than 11 million additional items. SearchOhio, the public library consortium among the libraries of Westerville and the county libraries of Cuyahoga, Mahoning, Lucas, Trumbull, Stark, Summit, Portage, and Greene provides direct access to almost 10 million additional items.

Cuyahoga County Public Library has branches in the suburbs of Bay Village, Beachwood, Bedford, Berea, Brecksville, Brook Park, Brooklyn, Chagrin Falls, Fairview Park, Garfield Heights, Gates Mills, Independence, Maple Heights, Mayfield, Middleburg Heights, North Olmsted, North Royalton, Olmsted Falls, Orange, Parma (Parma-Powers and Parma-Snow branches), Parma Heights, Richmond Heights, Solon, South Euclid-Lyndhurst, Strongsville, and Warrensville Heights.

== Services ==
Twelve of the library's branches contain Student Success Centers for use by students in grades K-8. The centers are funded with help from sponsors, including The Arby's Foundation, The Connor Foundation, EATON, and The Reinberger Foundation.

The library also offers passport services at all of its branches. The passport centers are open every day of the week until one hour before the branch closes.

Over 700 age appropriate toys and story kits are available through the Youth Literacy and Outreach Department.

The Fairview Park branch houses the genealogy collection. Anyone can access the online resources with a valid library card. These resources include Ancestry, Fold3, and Heritage Quest.

== Renovations ==
In 2011, the Cuyahoga County Public Library undertook an extensive construction and renovation program. Several branches have either been renovated or replaced by newer facilities. In 2012, the Beachwood and Solon Branches were renovated. Warrensville Heights opened a new state of the art library. The Mayfield Heights branch was moved to a new location on SOM Center Road in Mayfield. Garfield Heights, which had one of smallest branches at 11,165 sqft and built in 1964–65, broke ground on May 7, 2012, for a newer 30,000 sqft glass and steel structure which opened on September 7, 2013. Parma will have two branches. One Parma Library will be a consolidation of two branches and the new library was built near Parma City Hall. Parma-Snow was expanded and connected to the Library's administration center. The North Royalton library, originally located in the city's Memorial Park, was moved to a new facility in 2013. Also in 2012, the Library board announced plans to move the South Euclid-Lyndhurst branch from the historic Telling Mansion, its site since 1952, to a new site on Green Road across from Notre Dame college - which opened in 2015.

== Collaboration ==
In 2003, Cuyahoga County Public Library and the Cleveland Public Library collaborated to create the Greater Access Library Card. The card allows customers of either library and the libraries in the CLEVNET network to take out books from both systems without having to carry more than one library card.

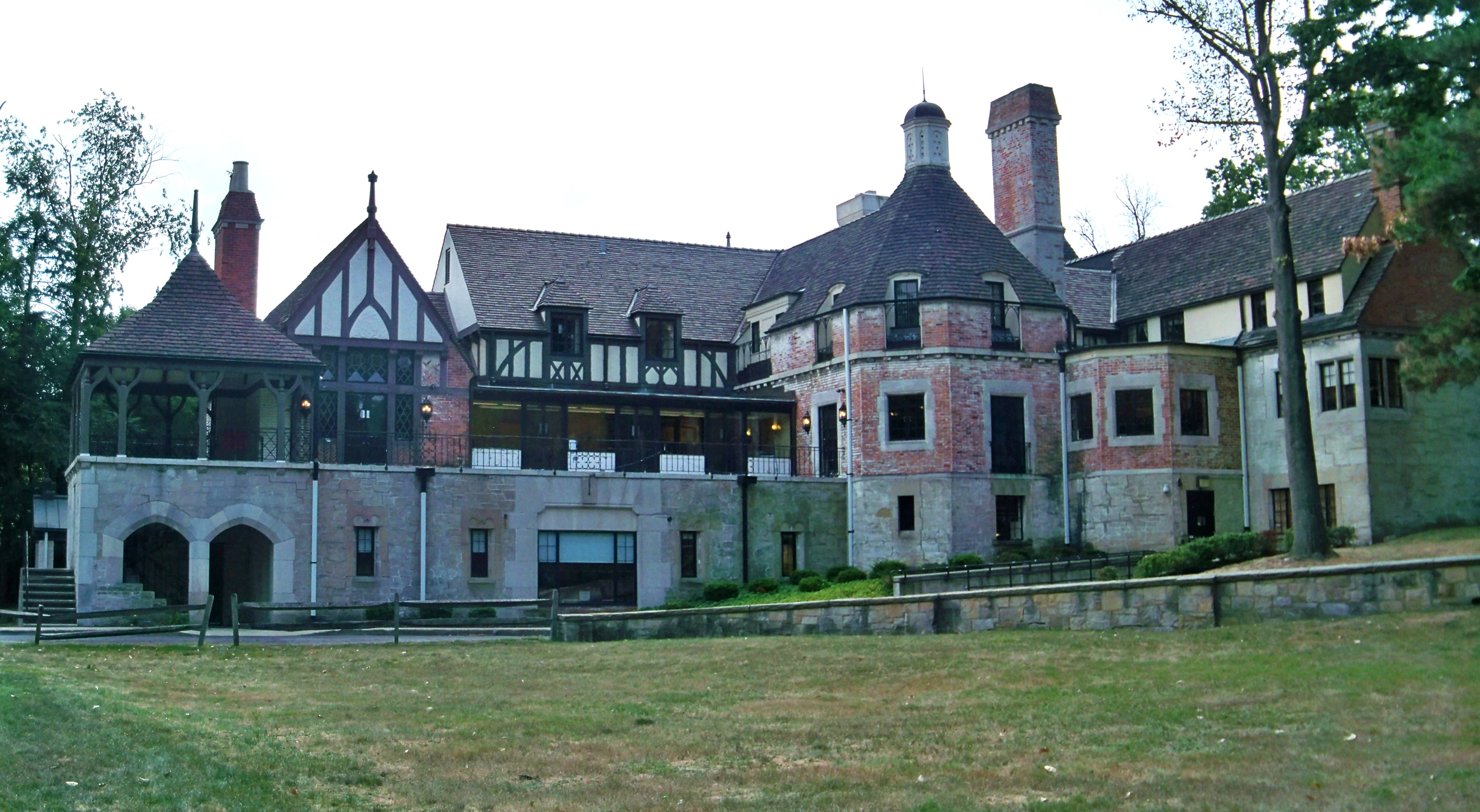
The South Euclid-Lyndhurst Branch of the CCPL system was housed in the historic William Telling mansion.

== See also ==
- Cleveland Public Library
- CLEVNET
