= SearchOhio =

SearchOhio is a consortium of public libraries in the state of Ohio that provides borrowing access to more than 10 million library items, including books, movies and music, providing easy access to information and rapid delivery of library materials throughout the state. It was established in 2006.

Cardholders at any participating library can request items online through the SearchOhio catalog (powered by Rapido, a product of Innovative Interfaces) to be delivered to their library in 3–5 business days. Items are shipped back to the owning library on return.

== Participating libraries ==
SearchOhio makes public library collections available to the communities served by the following libraries (as of September 2017).

- Akron-Summit County Public Library
- Cincinnati and Hamilton County Public Library
- Clermont County Public Library
- Cuyahoga County Public Library
- Cuyahoga Falls Library
- Delaware County District Library
- Greene County Public Library
- Kent Free Library
- The Lane Libraries
- Louisville Public Library
- Mansfield/Richland County Public Library
- Massillon Public Library
- Mentor Public Library
- MidPointe Library System
- Portage County District Library
- Reed Memorial Library
- Rodman Public Library
- Salem Public Library
- Stark County District Library
- Stow-Munroe Falls Public Library
- Toledo-Lucas County Public Library
- Troy-Miami County Public Library
- Wadsworth Public Library
- Warren-Trumbull County Public Library
- Washington-Centerville Public Library
- Westerville Public Library
- Westlake Porter Public Library
- Public Library of Youngstown and Mahoning County
