= Andre Wesson =

American basketball player (born 1997)

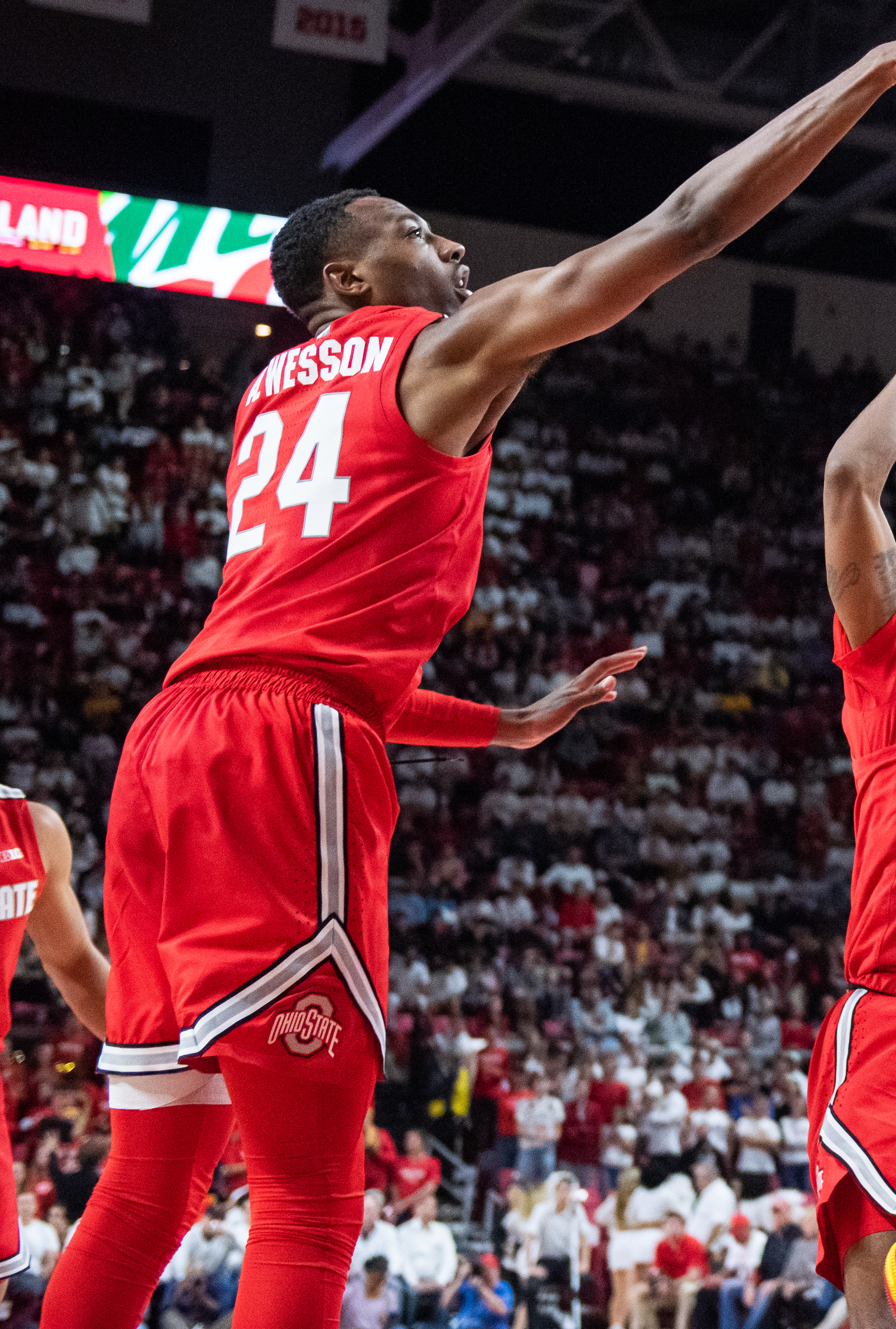
- Wesson with the Ohio State Buckeyes in 2020

No. 6 – Studentski centar
- Position: Small forward
- League: Prva A Liga; ABA League

Personal information
- Born: August 28, 1997 (age 29) Westerville, Ohio, U.S.
- Listed height: 6 ft 6 in (1.98 m)
- Listed weight: 220 lb (100 kg)

Career information
- High school: Westerville South (Westerville, Ohio)
- College: Ohio State (2016–2020)
- NBA draft: 2020: undrafted
- Playing career: 2021–present

Career history
- 2021–2022: Kobrat
- 2022: Nässjö
- 2022–2023: Anorthosis
- 2023–2024: Budapest Honvéd
- 2024–2025: Dziki Warszawa
- 2025–2026: Patrioti Levice
- 2026–present: Studentski centar

Keith Andre Wesson Jr. (born August 28, 1997) is an American professional basketball player for Studentski centar of the Prva A Liga and the ABA League. He played college basketball for the Ohio State Buckeyes.

== Early life ==
Wesson was raised in Westerville, Ohio and went to high school at the nearby Westerville South High School.

=== Recruiting ===
Wesson committed to Ohio State under head coach Thad Matta on April 13, 2016. After Matta was fired by Ohio State, Wesson stayed committed to Ohio State and new coach Chris Holtmann over offers from Butler (Holtmann's previous team), Xavier, and Akron.

College recruiting
Name	Hometown	School	Height	Weight	Commit date
Andre Wesson #30 PF	Westerville, OH	Westerville South High School	6 ft 6 in (1.98 m)	190 lb (86 kg)	Apr 13, 2015
Andre Wesson #30 PF	Recruit ratings: Scout: Rivals: 247Sports: ESPN:				
Overall recruit ranking:
Note: In many cases, Scout, Rivals, 247Sports, On3, and ESPN may conflict in their listings of height and weight.; In these cases, the average was taken. ESPN grades are on a 100-point scale.; Sources: "2016 Team Ranking". Rivals.

== College career ==
Wesson played in 29 games and averaged 2.3 points and 11.1 minutes per game.

He had his season–high points record against Purdue, scoring 13 points. He averaged 2.9 points and 18.5 minutes per game.

Wesson broke out during his junior season, averaging 8.6 points, 4.1 rebounds, and 30.0 minutes per game while starting 34 out of 35 games. He scored a career–high 22 points against Purdue.

His senior season was his best, starting 23 out of 29 games and averaging 9.2 points, 3.9 rebounds, and 30.9 minutes per game. He scored a season high 19 points against Morgan State His college career was cut short due to the COVID-19 pandemic.

== Professional career ==
On June 28, 2024, he signed with Dziki Warszawa of the Polish Basketball League (PLK).

On June 25, 2025, he signed with Patrioti Levice of Slovak Extraliga (basketball) (SLB).

== Career statistics ==
Legend
GP	Games played	GS	Games started	MPG	Minutes per game
FG%	Field goal percentage	3P%	3-point field goal percentage	FT%	Free throw percentage
RPG	Rebounds per game	APG	Assists per game	SPG	Steals per game
BPG	Blocks per game	PPG	Points per game	**Bold**	Career high

=== College ===
Year	Team	GP	GS	MPG	FG%	3P%	FT%	RPG	APG	SPG	BPG	PPG
2016–17	Ohio State	29	0	11.2	.365	.351	.536	1.2	.3	.2	.2	2.3
2017–18	Ohio State	34	5	18.5	.379	.286	.750	1.8	1.1	.3	.1	2.9
2018–19	Ohio State	**35**	**34**	30.0	.430	.336	.747	**4.1**	1.8	**.6**	**.4**	8.6
2019–20	Ohio State	29	23	**30.9**	**.462**	**.422**	**.800**	3.9	**1.9**	.3	**.4**	**9.2**

== Personal life ==
Wesson is the son of former Ohio State player Keith Wesson. His brother, Kaleb Wesson, also played at Ohio State from 2017 to 2021.
