= Nick Moore (Canadian football) =

American gridiron football player (born 1986)

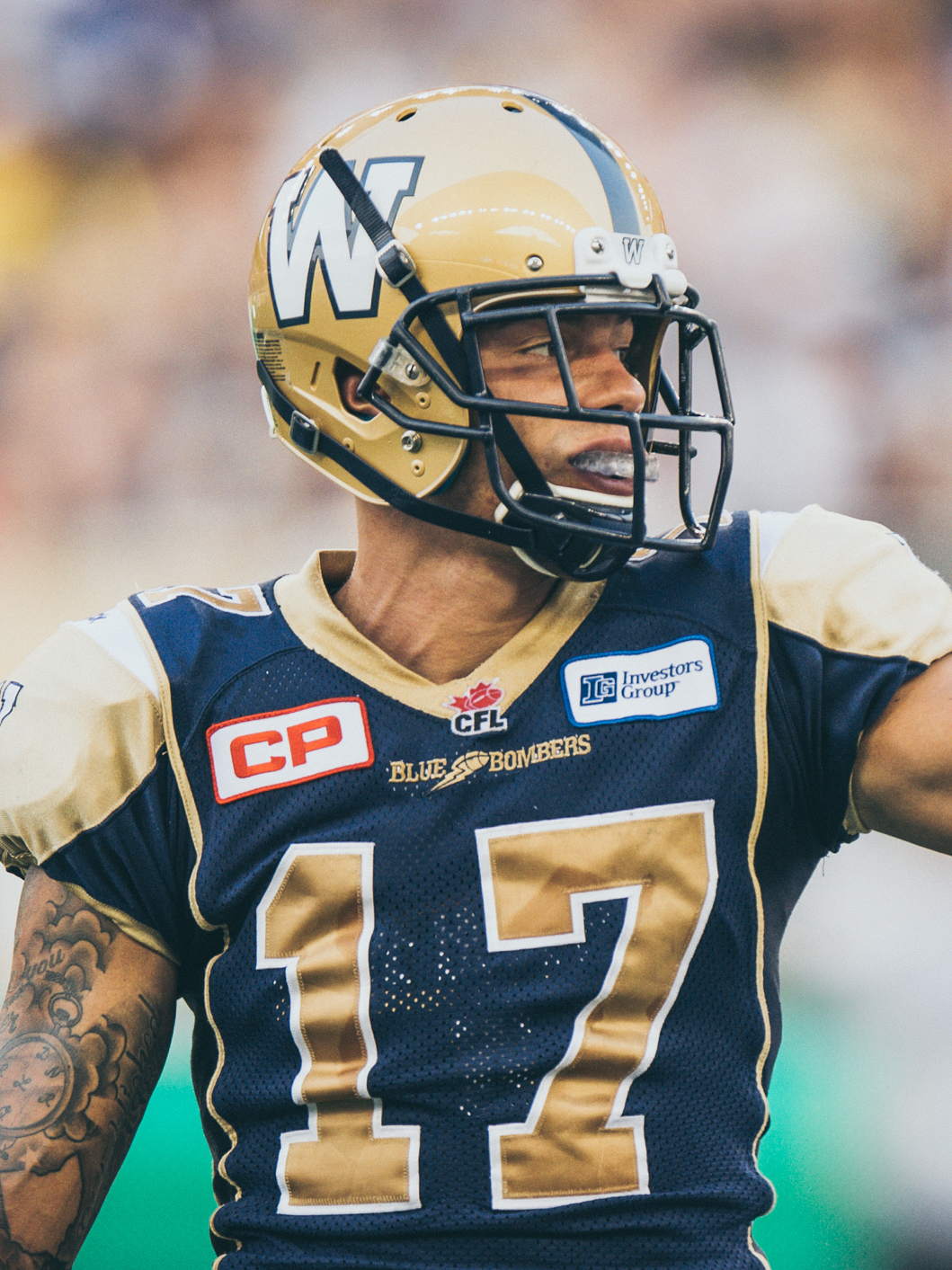
- Moore with the Winnipeg Blue Bombers in 2015

No. 17
- Position: Wide receiver

Personal information
- Born: June 25, 1986 (age 40); Westerville, Ohio, U.S.
- Listed height: 6 ft 2 in (1.88 m)
- Listed weight: 195 lb (88 kg)

Career information
- College: Toledo

Career history
- 2009: Minnesota Vikings*
- 2009: New England Patriots*
- 2010: St. Louis Rams*
- 2010: Florida Tuskers
- 2011–2013: BC Lions
- 2014–2015: Winnipeg Blue Bombers
- 2016–2017: BC Lions
- * Offseason or practice squad member only
- Stats at CFL.ca

Nicholas A. Moore (born June 25, 1986) is an American former professional football wide receiver who played seven seasons in the Canadian Football League (CFL) with the BC Lions and Winnipeg Blue Bombers. He was originally signed by the Minnesota Vikings as an undrafted free agent in 2009. He played college football at Toledo.

Moore was also a member of the New England Patriots, St. Louis Rams, and Florida Tuskers. He is the brother of former NFL wide receiver Lance Moore.

== Early life ==
Moore attended Westerville South High School in Westerville, Ohio, where he played football as a wide receiver, as well as basketball and track and field. In football, he had 55 receptions and 12 touchdowns as a senior and was named team MVP. He was selected to play in the Big 33 Football Classic (Ohio vs. Pennsylvania) and was a second-team all-district pick. He was an honorable mention all-district selection as a junior.

== College career ==
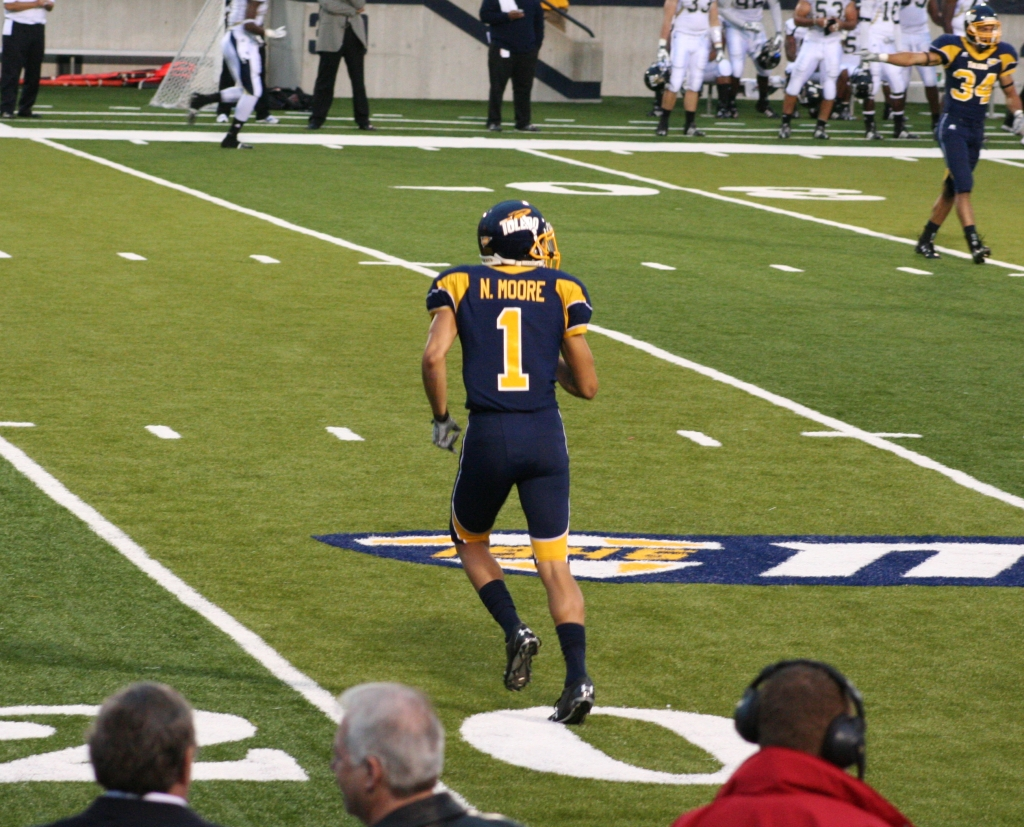
Moore in 2008

After graduating from high school, Moore attended the University of Toledo. After redshirting his freshman season in 2004, Moore started 10 of 11 games as a sophomore and was fourth on team with 24 receptions and third with 335 yards receiving. He also caught four touchdowns and led team with 14.0 yards per catch. As a junior, Moore started in eight games, missing two to injury, and was fourth on team with 20 receptions in 10 games. As a junior in 2007, Moore ranked second on his team with 60 receptions for 731 yards. He was named third-team All-MAC. As a senior, Moore played in and started 5 games, catching 78 passes for 779 yards.

At Toledo, Moore was a two-time All-MAC receiver, leading the Rockets with 78 receptions in 2008. His college career highlight occurred vs. Michigan on October 11, 2008, when he caught 20 balls for 162 yards in a 13–10 upset of the Wolverines.

== Professional career ==
=== Minnesota Vikings ===
Moore was signed by the Minnesota Vikings after going undrafted in the 2009 NFL draft. He was waived by the team on September 5, 2009, and re-signed to the team's practice squad the next day. He was released from the Vikings' practice squad on September 29, 2009.

=== New England Patriots ===
The Patriots signed Moore to their practice squad on January 6, 2010, in advance of their first playoff game against the Baltimore Ravens.

=== St. Louis Rams ===
Moore was signed by the St. Louis Rams on February 2, 2010.

=== BC Lions ===
Moore was signed by the BC Lions on October 6, 2010, to a practice roster agreement. Following the 2011 training camp, Moore earned a spot on the 46-man active roster. Moore had a breakout season in his third year in the CFL. He finished 3rd in the league with 1,105 receiving yards and added 6 receiving touchdowns.

=== Winnipeg Blue Bombers ===
Moore entered 2014 CFL Free Agency as the top free agent in the market. On February 11, 2014, Moore signed with the Winnipeg Blue Bombers. In his first season with the Bombers Moore finished the year third on the team in receptions (44) and receiving yards (553). Quite impressive considering he missed half the season with injuries. He failed to catch touchdown pass for the first time since his rookie year in the CFL. Moore had a productive second season with the Bombers catching a career-high 76 passes for 899 yards with 4 touchdowns. Following the 2015 season he was not re-signed by the Bombers.

=== BC Lions (II) ===
On February 9, 2016, the first day of CFL free-agency, Moore agreed to a contract with his former team the BC Lions. On July 16, Moore tore his ACL while celebrating after a touchdown in a Week 4 match against the Saskatchewan Roughriders; ending his season. In the fourth week of the 2017 CFL season Moore caught 11 passes for 220 yards (both career highs), earning him player of the week honours.
