= Westerville North High School =

Location
- 950 County Line Road; Westerville, Delaware County, Ohio 43081; United States; 40°7′58″N 82°53′51″W

Information
- Type: Public, Coeducational high school
- Opened: 1975
- School district: Westerville City Schools
- NCES School ID: 390450401961
- Principal: Kurt Yancey
- Faculty: 91.73 (on an FTE basis)
- Grades: 9–12
- Enrollment: 1,587 (2024–25)
- Student to teacher ratio: 17.30
- Colors: Cardinal and gold
- Athletics conference: Ohio Capital Conference
- Team name: Warriors
- Website: https://wnhs.westerville.k12.oh.us/

Westerville North High School is a public high school in Westerville, Ohio in Delaware County, Ohio. It is one of three high schools in the Westerville City School District. Athletic teams are known as the Warriors, and they compete in the Ohio High School Athletic Association as a member of the Ohio Capital Conference.

== History ==
Westerville North High School opened in 1975 as the second high school in the Westerville City School District, created to accommodate increasing enrollment as suburban development expanded north of Columbus. Prior to its opening, students in the district primarily attended Westerville High School (now Westerville South High School), which had served as the district's original secondary school.

In 2003, the district opened a third high school, Westerville Central High School, which shifted attendance boundaries and helped balance enrollment among the three schools. Over the decades, the school has undergone various renovations and updates to modernize its facilities and support evolving educational needs.

Westerville North has appeared a few times in the mainstream media, most notably, the school received national attention in 2007, after a student had oiled himself up and went streaking inside the school. The student was tased several times and arrested. The student was charged with inducing panic, public indecency, resisting arrest and disorderly conduct.

== Athletics ==
=== OHSAA State championships ===
- Girls track and field - 1977, 1979
- Boys basketball – 1994, 2025
- Boys track and field – 1998*
- Boys soccer – 1995, 2003
- Girls soccer – 1990,1992

*1998 boys track and field championship tied with Brunswick

=== Other state championship ===
- Dance team – 2023
- Boys tennis – 1985

== Academic honors ==
Westerville North is listed #1205 on Newsweek's list of "America's Top High Schools" for 2010

As of 2017 Westerville North is listed as #1763 on US News High Schools

== Notable alumni ==
- Philip Alston, professional basketball player in the National Basketball Association (NBA)
- Jeff Davidson, former professional football player in the National Football League (NFL)
- Josh Harris, former professional football player in the National Football League (NFL)
- Bob Kennedy, former Olympic track and field runner
- Kevin Martin, professional basketball player in the National Basketball Association (NBA
- Shaun Stonerook, former professional basketball player in the National Basketball Association (NBA)
- Ryan Wilson, Olympic track and field runner
