= Westerville Public Library =

Public library in Ohio

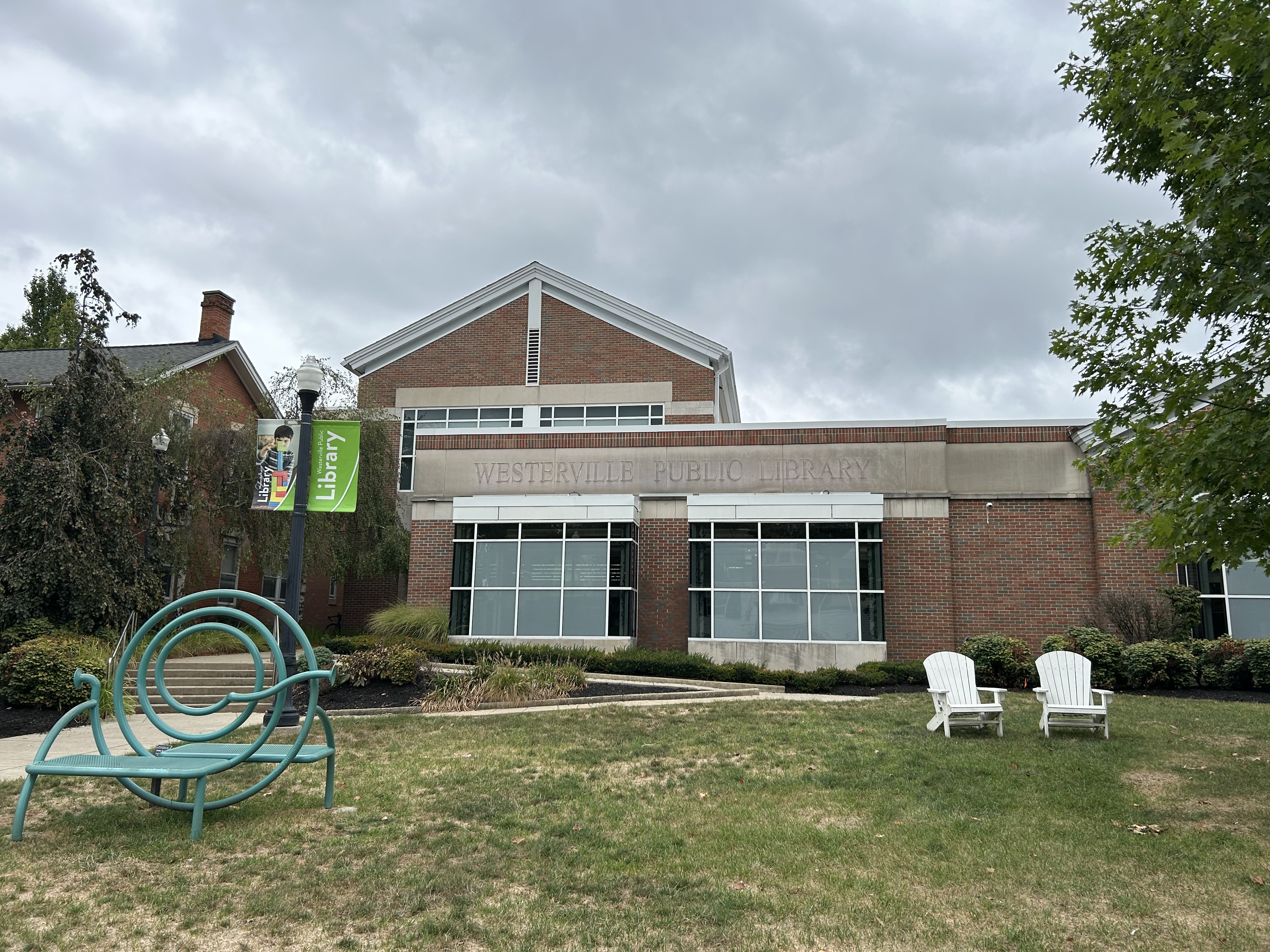
- 40.122837°N 82.929756°W
- Location: Westerville, Ohio
- Type: Public library
- Established: 1930

Access and use
- Circulation: 2,045,537
- Population served: 92,603

Other information
- Budget: $7,818,000
- Director: Erin Francoeur
- Employees: 105
- Website: https://www.westervillelibrary.org/

The Westerville Public Library is a public library that serves the community of Westerville, Ohio, a suburb of Columbus, Ohio. As a school district library, its geographic boundaries are defined by the Westerville City School District which is located in both Franklin County and Delaware County. All Ohio residents can apply for a Westerville Public Library card.

== Services ==
=== Circulating Materials ===
The library circulates (i.e. allows cardholders to borrow) the following types of items in various formats for education or entertainment purposes:

Books	Movies	Music	Other
Audiobooks on CD	Blu-ray	CDs	Art Prints
Books	Described Videos for the Visually Impaired	eMusic	Baskets
eAudiobooks	DVDs		CD-ROM
eBooks	Playaway Videos		eMagazines
Large Print	Spanish-Language DVDs		Electricity Usage Monitors
Playaways			Magazines
Readalongs			Puzzles
World Language Books			Science & Literacy Kits
			Wi-Fi Hotspots
			Guitars
			Laptops
			Tool Kits

Library cardholders also have the option to request items from other libraries through SearchOhio or OhioLINK. The Westerville Public Library is also a member of the Central Library Consortium, which enables its 17-member library systems to share a catalog.

=== Events & Programs ===
The library hosts events and programs for patrons of all ages, including story times, computer classes, book clubs, etc. There were 1,618 events held in 2024.

The Westerville Public Library is also known for their month-long "Wizards & Wands" event where the entire library is decorated with thematic pieces and décor from various fantasy worlds and stories. The program runs all of October and culminated in the "Wizards & Wands Festival" that is held on the last Friday of October. There is live entertainment and performances held in and around the library. Previous years have included live animal visits, jugglers, musicians and magical science experiments. The icon of the Westerville Public Library's "Wizards & Wands" has been Hilda, a dragon that nests on the roof of the library throughout October. In 2023, Hilda had been retired due to weathering and her baby Agnes, which was designed by Otterbein University students, has since taken her place on the roof.

=== School Deliveries ===
School deliveries (formerly named Library Link and established as a service to replace Project Connect in 2004) are made daily of Westerville Public Library materials to any participating school in the Westerville City School District. Students, faculty, and staff of the participating schools can all receive library materials, except for art prints, as dictated by library policies.

=== Home Deliveries ===
The Westerville Public Library offers free delivery of library materials to homebound individuals, caregivers, and those with short-term needs. Deliveries are also available to full-time caregivers and any resident of a nursing home, assisted living facility, or senior apartment within the Westerville City School District, regardless of health or mobility.

=== Website ===
The Westerville Public Library website provides free access to the library's catalog of circulating materials, as well as remote access to an extensive collection of research databases and digital collections, such as ebooks, audiobooks, magazines, and music.

== History ==
The Westerville Public Library has been recognized as being on the "cutting edge" in the technology field; as one study notes, "it was the first Ohio library to provide public internet access, the first to have a Web-based catalog, the first to implement self-check machines, etc."

=== 1930s ===
- 1930: The Westerville Public Library was established on December 15, 1930, and was located on the first floor of the residence of Purley Baker, temperance leader in the Anti-Saloon League. Cora Bailey was the librarian, and within several weeks it contained 3,062 volumes and 885 registered borrowers.
- 1932: The library expanded to the second floor of the municipal building (which is today a part of the municipal complex on State Street).

=== 1950s ===
- 1952: Jane Willson Bradford became director.
- 1954: A new building was constructed on the current site. It boasted 41,000 volumes and 4,000 borrowers.

=== 1970s ===
- 1973: The sole trustee of the Anti-Saloon League donated to the library their headquarters, land and extensive 200,000 volume temperance collection. (This building now houses the library's Administrative Offices, Community Services Department, the Local History Resource Center and the Anti-Saloon League Museum.)
- 1979: A levy was passed and 17,820 square feet (1,656 m^{2}) of space was added to the library, including a public meeting room and a study area.

=== 1980s ===
- 1980s: The library's catalog became an online computerized system in the 1980s
- 1988: Don W. Barlow assumed the directorship.

=== 1990s ===
- 1991: Implemented Dial-up internet access to the library's catalog. Circulation was over 1.2 million and holdings over 200,000 volumes.
- 1993: Westerville patrons became the first in the state to use self-check-out machines.
- 1994: Westerville became the first public library in Ohio to offer full Internet access to patrons via the World Wide Web. The library spearheaded a community information network in Westerville by developing home pages for the City of Westerville, Westerville City Schools, the Westerville Area Chamber of Commerce, and the Westerville Visitors and Convention Bureau.
- 1995: Voters passed a levy by 63% for an expansion project which added 27,000 square feet (2,500 m^{2}) to the facility, providing space for an expanding collection, increased seating, and a technology center.
- 1997: The library was recognized as a leader in technology in 1997, receiving the "Technology Company of the Year" Award for Central Ohio.
- 1998: Two 1998 Builders Exchange Craftsmanship Awards were earned for outstanding exterior masonry work and the meticulously paneled two-story birch wall in the atrium. The expanded area included a gift shop operated by the Friends of the Library.
- 1999: Patrons were given the ability to reserve items through the Internet and pick them up through a drive-up window. In September 1999, Hennen's American Public Library Rating Index rated 9,000 libraries nationwide and named Westerville Public Library the top-ranked library among those serving populations of 50,000 to 99,999.

=== 2000s ===
- 2000: Book delivery to homebound and senior citizen facilities increased by 135%. In December, the 1983 catalog system was replaced by Millennium, a product of Innovative Interfaces, Inc., equipping every computer with Web-based access to the library collection, nineteen databases, and a catalog just for kids.
- 2002: The first operating levy for the library passed, assisting with the loss of state funding.
- 2003: Hennen's ranked the Library as No. 2 in the nation.
- 2004: Library Link (now known as school deliveries) was established, a project that provides daily delivery of library materials to every school in the Westerville City School District.
- 2005: The library served the needs of 78,300 cardholders, receiving 621,704 walk-in visitors and .5 million electronic visits. Total holdings are over 347,000 volumes with over 500 periodical subscriptions.
- 2006: A building project was completed that enlarged the Media Department, provided a Computer Room for children, and created an area for teens. The library led a consortium of five Ohio county public libraries in the establishment of SearchOhio, a network for sharing resources. SearchOhio also has access to the collections of Ohio's colleges and universities. The John R. Kasich Congressional Collection was unveiled, the only such collection listed in the National Archives to be held by a public library.
- 2007: A 0.8-mill replacement levy passed by a 78% margin. Circulation topped 1.9 million items.
- 2009: The library had 95,470 registered borrowers, circulated 2,149,919 items, and saw 51,351 people attending library programs and events with total operating costs of $6,055,323.

=== 2010s ===
- 2010: Hennen's American Public Library Ratings ranked Westerville as the 8th best public library in the nation among those serving district populations of 50,000 to 99,999. The library was also recognized as a “Star Library” and awarded a 5-star rating (the highest possible) in the 2010 Index of Public Library Service recently released by Library Journal. (Out of 7,407 public libraries, only 85 received a five-star ranking.)
- 2011: Library Journal ranked Westerville as a 5-Star Library. (Out of 7,513 public libraries, only 85 received a five-star ranking.) A 2-mill replacement levy was approved by voters in November 2011. The 2-mill levy replaced a 0.8-mill levy originally passed in 2002 and allowed the library to reopen on Sundays, among other projects.
- 2013: The library launched their Meet the Authors series. Since then, the library has welcomed authors from all walks of life, including Rick Steves, Diana Gabaldon, Kareem Abdul-Jabbar, Debbie Macomber, Jason Reynolds, Alexander McCall Smith, Jodi Picoult, and Nick Offerman.
- 2013: Library Journal ranked Westerville as a 5-Star Library. (Out of more than 9,000 public libraries, only 82 received a five-star ranking.)
- 2014: The Ohio SHRM State Council and Best Companies Group named the Westerville Public Library as one of the Best Employers in Ohio in 2014. Forty businesses were named and the Westerville Public Library was ranked as #16 in the Small/Medium Employer Category. Library Journal has recognized the Westerville Public Library as a Five-Star Library. Of the 7,586 public libraries nationwide that were ranked this year, only 85 were awarded a five-star rating, placing Westerville in the top 1% of all public libraries in the United States. Voted Best Library Children's Area & Best Library Story Times by Columbus Parent in 2014.
  - Library Director Don W. Barlow was elected to the Ohio Library Council Hall of Fame for his lifetime achievements in Ohio libraries.
  - Library Journal recognized the Westerville Public Library as a Five-Star Library. Of the 7,586 public libraries nationwide that were ranked this year, only 82 were awarded a five-star rating.
- 2015: SearchOhio has grown significantly and boasts a membership of 28 Public libraries, and 82 Academic libraries with holdings of over 73 million items. "Columbus Parent's 2015 "Best of Columbus" Ranked Westerville as having the Best Children's Department and Children's Story hours.
  - Library Journal once again recognized the Westerville Public Library as a Five-Star Library. There were 85 libraries to receive this honor in 2015, placing the library in the top 1% of public libraries nationwide.
  - The Westerville History Museum began to install rotating and traveling exhibits that have attracted visitors from near and far. Themes have included the Prohibition Era, WWI, WWII, fashion, food, and more.
- 2016: The Ohio SHRM State Council and Best Companies Group named the Westerville Public Library as one of the Best Employers in Ohio in 2016. Thirty-nine businesses were named and the Westerville Public Library was ranked as #14 in the Small/Medium Employer Category.
- 2017: The library stopped charging overdue fines.

=== 2020s ===
- 2020: The Innovation Lab opened with access to custom printing, 3D printing, digital creation, and advanced design tools.
- 2020-2022: Story trails were installed at Hilmar Park, Johnston-McVay Park, and Ridgewood Park in partnership with Genoa Township, City of Westerville, and Blendon Township.
- 2024: The library joined the Central Library Consortium. Pickup lockers and return bins installed at Blendon Township Community Senior Center. A 0.75-mill additional operating levy passed.

== Other information ==
=== Westerville History Museum ===
The Library is also the home of a museum dedicated to preserving and sharing Westerville’s history through its collections of national and local interest. One collection of national importance is for the Anti-Saloon League, a famous American temperance organization that was established in Oberlin, Ohio on May 24, 1893, and dissolved in 1933. The organization was established to "work for unification of public anti-alcohol sentiment, enforcement of existing temperance laws, and encourage the enactment of further anti-alcohol legislation." The city of Westerville, Ohio was dry for well over a century. Westerville was once called the "dry capital of the world", however it has recently relinquished that title as the first legal drink in recent times was served in Westerville in 2006.

=== John R. Kasich Collection ===
On June 11, 2006, the Westerville Public Library unveiled the John R. Kasich Congressional Collection. The collection includes biographical, travel, campaign, and Republican Party files from John Kasich's terms in the U.S. House of Representatives, as well as correspondence with constituents, 1,128 multimedia files, speeches, and memorabilia, such as his Congressional desk and the gavel he used as chair of the House budget committee.

== See also ==
- Anti-Saloon League
- John Kasich
- Prohibition
- Public library
- Westerville, Ohio
