= Louisville Public Library =

Library system in Ohio (USA)

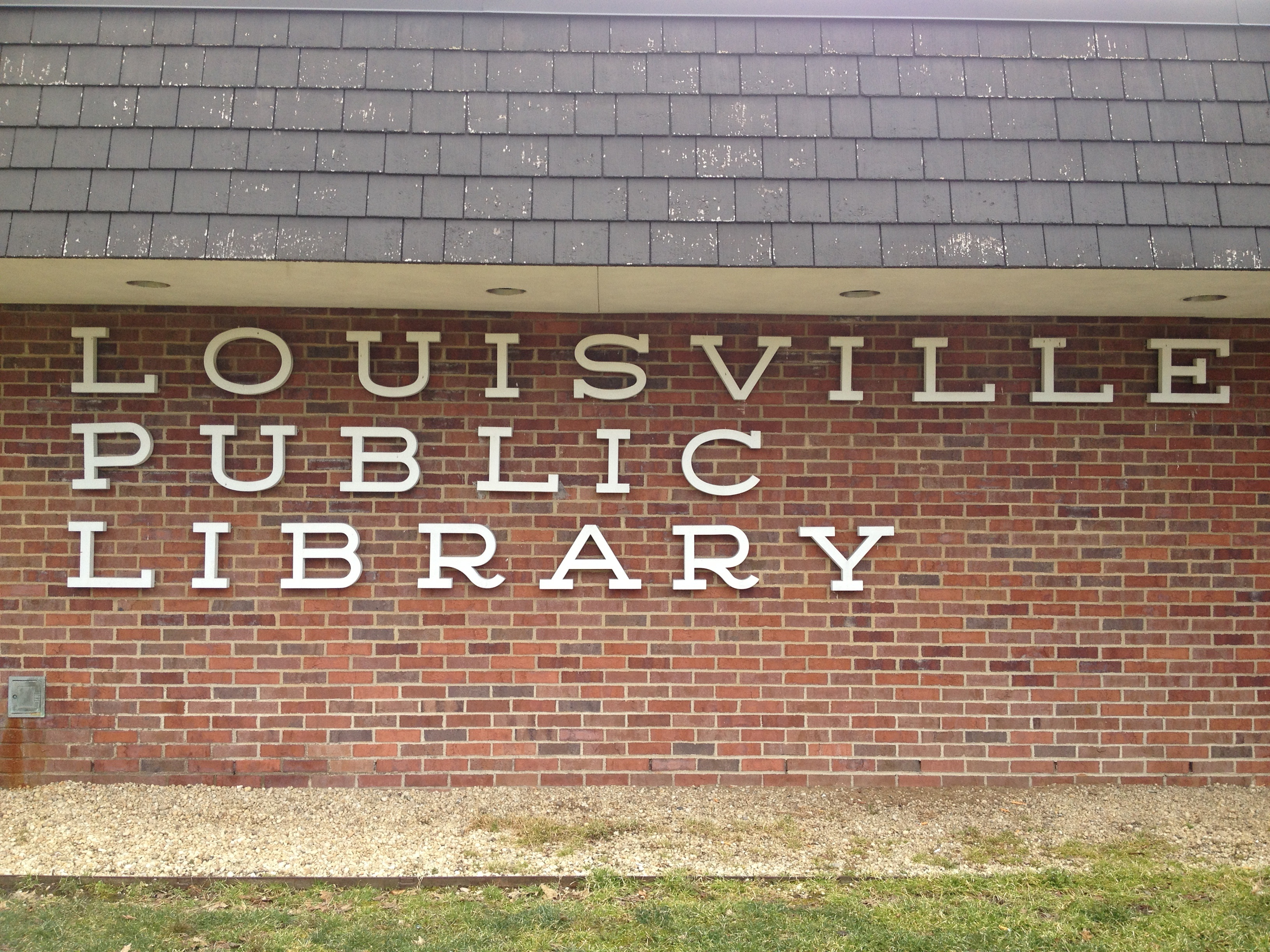
- 700 Lincoln Ave
- 40.84040599679093°N 81.25423726553845°W
- Location: Louisville, Ohio, United States
- Type: Public library

Other information
- Website: https://www.louisvillelibrary.org/

Find sources: "Louisville Public Library" Louisville, Ohio – news · newspapers · books · scholar · JSTOR

The Louisville Public Library is located in Louisville, Ohio, United States. The library serves the residents of Nimishillen Township and the city of Louisville.

Since October 1969, the library has been located at 700 Lincoln Avenue.

== History ==
The Louisville Public Library was founded in 1935 as part of the former Louisville Middle School, at first operating only within school hours and closed during the summer. After the library's collection outgrew the middle school space and a former home, the library moved to its building at 700 Lincoln Avenue in 1969. Since then, the library has grown its collection to include audiovisual materials and video games.

In December 2021, the library was able to set up a hot spot program through a grant they received. It was to give hot spots for internet to those adults and children who are in school. As of January 2022 the library has 200 hot spots and is looking for funding to keep the program running.

== Services ==
The Library offers a free summer reading program to all patrons, consisting of challenges and awards for reading during the summer. During the week, the Library has a video gaming session, a STEM-based learning and craft course, summer camps such as the NASA-funded Rocket Girlz. Additionally, adult-themed programs are offered to patrons, with a food-themed book club and chair yoga on a monthly or weekly basis. The library offers e-cards for use in ordering materials online or for reserving other digital materials. Through the online consortium SearchOhio, the Library participates in a collection of about 49.5 million books and materials.

== Sensory Space ==
The Louisville Public Library opened the U.S.’ first free public Sensory Space in October 2018. The Sensory Space, named the Discovery Center, provides patrons with autism a means to learn and play with interactive sound boards and a projected image touch mat. For under-stimulated children an interactive balance beam and a colorful mirror. To stimulate sound awareness a sound bed is connected to the audio system.

== Library Lab Makerspace ==
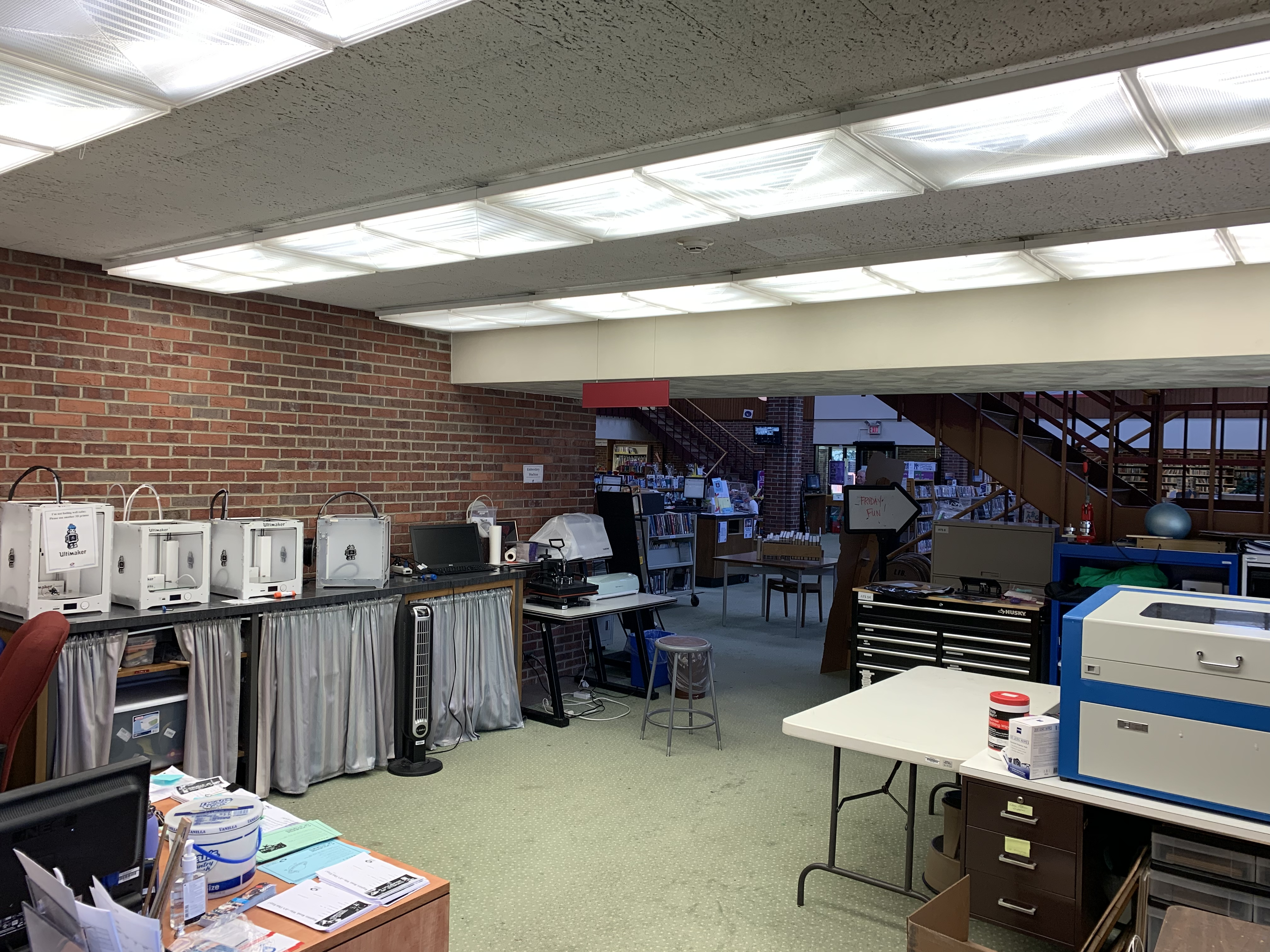
3D printers in the Louisville Public Library's Makerspace. In the foreground is a laser wood engraving machine.

Following a trend among public libraries, the Louisville Public Library has a Makerspace with 3D printers, a laser wood engraving machine, and other equipment for patrons to create their own designs for personal or business use. The Makerspace assesses charges based on costs of materials needed for the design. Lastly, an embroidering machine is available for use in any craft.
