= Westerville City School District =

School district in Ohio, United States

Address
- 936 Eastwind Drive Ste 200 Westerville, Ohio, 43081; United States
- Coordinates: 40°7′25″N 82°55′17″W

District information
- Type: Public
- Grades: PK–12
- Established: 1855; 171 years ago
- Superintendent: Angela S. Hamberg
- Schools: 24
- NCES District ID: 3904504

Students and staff
- Students: 14,589 (2025–2026)
- Teachers: 854.69 (on an FTE basis) (2025–2026)
- Staff: 1,666.72 (on an FTE basis) (2025–2026)
- Student–teacher ratio: 17.07 (2025–2026)
- Athletic conference: Ohio Capital Conference

Other information
- Website: www.westerville.k12.oh.us

Westerville City Schools serves Westerville, Minerva Park, Blendon Township, portions of Columbus, and other nearby rural areas. Though the district is situated in northern Franklin County, it also serves much of Genoa Township in southern Delaware County. The district is the 12th largest in Ohio.

On the 09–10 state report card, Westerville City Schools were rated "Excellent with Distinction", for the 16th consecutive year, the district earned the “What Parents Want” in education designation from SchoolMatch.

In 2009, the Westerville Alumni Association was formed to serve the graduates of the three current high schools (Westerville South, North, and Central) as well as the graduates of the original Westerville High School. The stated mission of the Association is to foster greater connections among the alumni community and to ensure the development and continued success of the Westerville high schools through student scholarships and teacher grants.

== Schools ==
=== Elementary ===
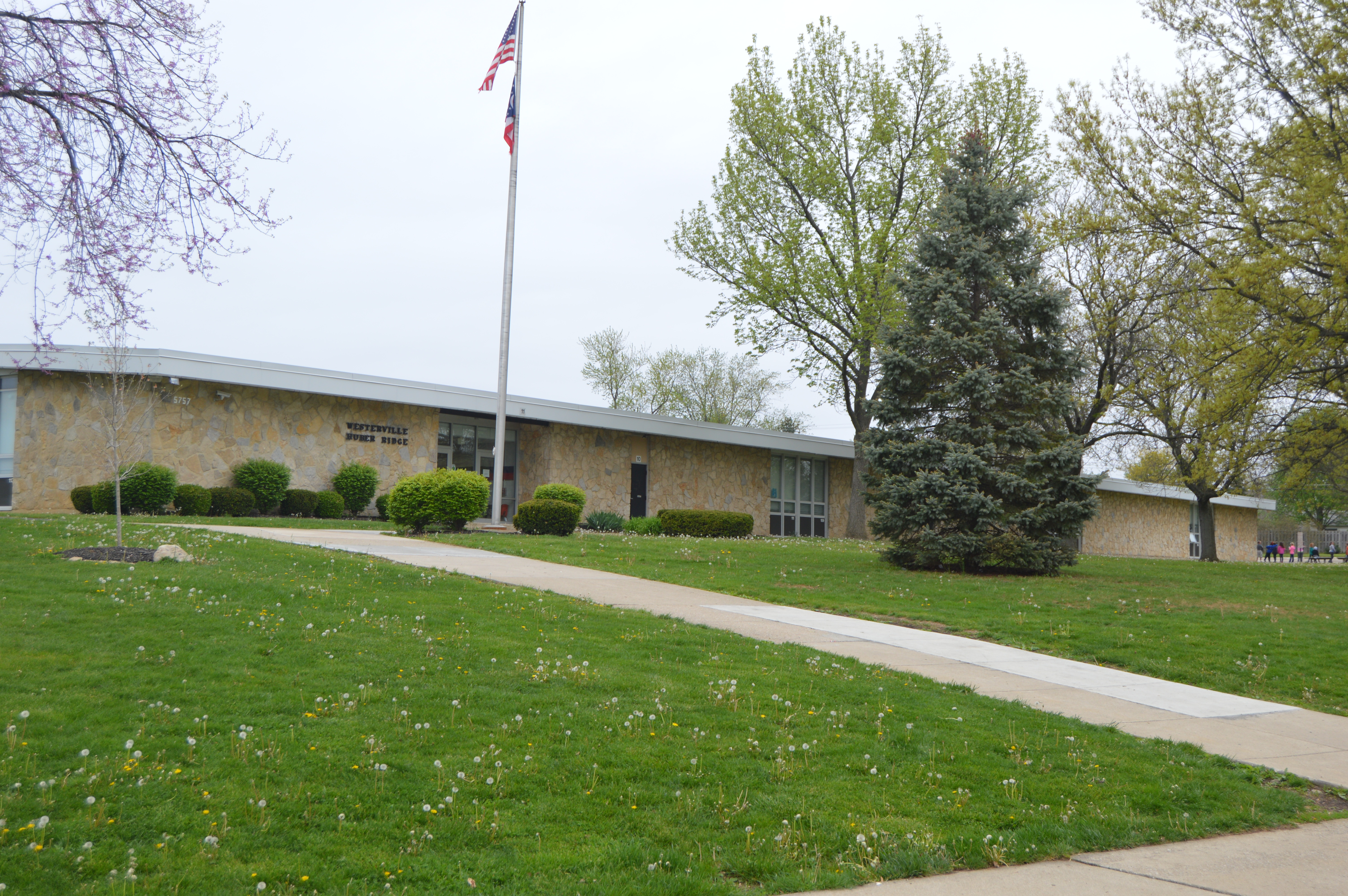
Huber Ridge Elementary School

- Alcott Elementary
- Annehurst Elementary
- Cherrington Elementary
- Emerson Elementary
- Fouse Elementary
- Hanby Elementary
- Hawthorne Elementary
- Huber Ridge Elementary
- McVay Elementary
- Mark Twain Elementary
- Minerva France Elementary
- Pointview Elementary
- Robert Frost Elementary
- Whittier Elementary
- Wilder Elementary

=== Middle ===
- Blendon Middle School
- Genoa Middle School
- Heritage Middle School
- Minerva Park Middle School
- Walnut Springs Middle School

=== High ===
- Westerville Central High School
- Westerville North High School
- Westerville South High School
