= Westerville Central High School =

Location
- 7118 Mount Royal Avenue; Westerville, Delaware County, Ohio 43082; United States; 40°09′17″N 82°54′16″W

Information
- Type: Public, Coeducational high school
- Opened: August 2003
- School district: Westerville City School District
- Superintendent: Angela Hamberg
- Principal: Dawn Sayre
- Teaching staff: 92.23 (FTE)
- Grades: 9-12
- Enrollment: 1,500 (2023–2024)
- Student to teacher ratio: 16.26
- Colors: Silver and Black
- Athletics conference: Ohio Capital Conference
- Team name: Warhawks
- Newspaper: The Wire
- Yearbook: The Talon
- Website: https://wchs.westerville.k12.oh.us/

Westerville Central High School is a public high school located in Westerville, Ohio, northeast of Columbus. It is the newest of three high schools in the Westerville City School District. It opened in August 2003.

== History ==
Westerville experienced a population boom in the late 1990s, particularly in Genoa Township in the northern part of the school district. In order to keep up with the growth, the district announced that it would build two new elementary schools and a third high school. Westerville was the second Greater Columbus school district to build a third high school. The district asked taxpayers to pay for part for the new buildings. Central cost the district $40 million, but voters turned the district down. Eventually, the district secured the funds and Central opened in August 2003. Students had the opportunity to select the school mascot and colors. The winning nickname was the Warhawks. The colors chosen were Black and Silver.

On March 3, 2008, Central hosted President Barack Obama, who was then a candidate in the Democratic Party Presidential primary election.

On March 14, 2016, Central housed presidential candidate John Kasich for a local rally the day before Ohio's Republican primary.

== The facility ==
Westerville Central

Construction began on Central in 2002. The district hired Firestone Jaros Mullin, Inc./TMP Architecture to execute the project after declaring its proposal the best of those offered. The school features numerous facilities, including seven athletic fields, a 5,000-seat stadium, an 1800-seat gymnasium, and a state-of-the-art 750-seat auditorium/theatre. The school design called for four distinct academic "wings" for focus on individual subjects. Each "academy" is marked by color; there are red, yellow, blue, and green wings. Central's centerpiece is its common area, traditionally referred to as Central Avenue. It serves as the school's dining area, is the point that connects all wings of the school, and also is the site for many school functions. It is meant to resemble Westerville's historic business district, Uptown Westerville, with a design that includes storefronts, signs, and lampposts. For its design, the school design earned the designation of "2004 Outstanding Design Award" from American School and University magazine.

== Opening ==
Central opened its doors to students in the fall of 2003, enrolling only freshmen and sophomores. Central added a third class in the 2004-05 school year and had its first senior class in the 2005-06 school year.

In the spring of 2007, Principal Todd Meyer announced that he would be leaving his position at Central to become the principal at Olentangy Orange High School, a new high school in the Olentangy Local School District set to open in 2008. Todd Spinner was chosen to be the new principal after an extensive search. Spinner had been the assistant principal at Delaware Hayes High School.

== Athletics ==
Westerville Central is an OHSAA Division I school that competes in the Ohio Capital Conference (OCC) Ohio Division alongside Gahanna Lincoln, Grove City, New Albany, Pickerington North, and Central Crossing. The school has crosstown rivalries with Westerville North and Westerville South.

=== OHSAA State Championships ===
- Boys Baseball - 2015 State Runner-Up
- Boys Bowling - 2017
- Boys Basketball - 2021 State Runner-Up
- Boys Track & Field - 2021 State Runner-Up
- Girls Track & Field - 2022 State Runner-Up

== Notable alumni ==
- Benny Snell - National Football League (NFL) football player
- Nick Vannett - National Football League (NFL) football player
