= Westerville, Ohio =

- City
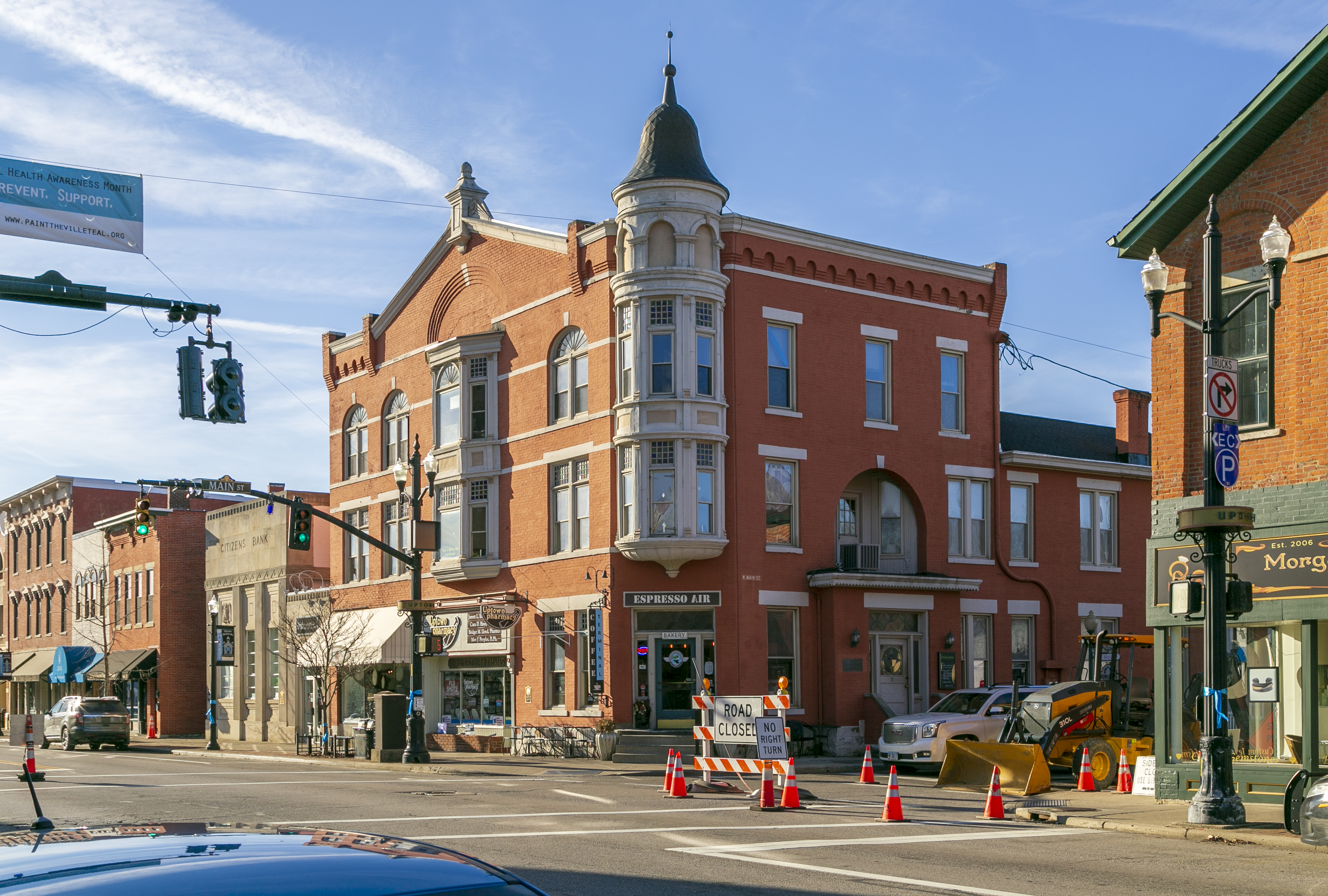
- Uptown Westerville Historic District

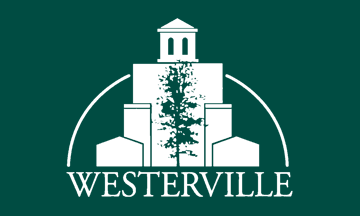
- Flag
- Interactive map of Westerville, Ohio
- Location within Ohio Location within the United States
- Coordinates: 40°07′50″N 82°55′22″W
- Country: United States
- State: Ohio
- Counties: Delaware, Franklin
- Incorporated: 1858

Area
  - Total: 12.74 sq mi (33.00 km^{2})
  - Land: 12.60 sq mi (32.64 km^{2})
  - Water: 0.14 sq mi (0.36 km^{2})
- Elevation: 879 ft (268 m)

Population (2020)
  - Total: 39,190
  - Density: 3,109.9/sq mi (1,200.74/km^{2})
- Time zone: UTC-5 (EST)
  - Summer (DST): UTC-4 (EDT)
- ZIP codes: 43081, 43082, 43086
- Area codes: 614 and 380
- FIPS code: 39-83342
- GNIS feature ID: 1086118
- Website: westerville.org

Westerville is a city in Franklin and Delaware counties in the U.S. state of Ohio. A northeastern suburb of Columbus, its population was 39,190 at the 2020 census. The city is home to Otterbein University. It was once known as the "Dry Capital of the World" for its strict laws prohibiting sales of alcohol and for being the home of the Anti-Saloon League, one of the driving forces behind the Prohibition era at the beginning of the 20th century.

== History ==
Hanby House, circa 1905

=== Native Americans ===
Cultures have inhabited the Westerville area for several millennia. Paleo-Indians and their successor cultures inhabited the area between Big Walnut Creek and Alum Creek. The Wyandotte were the primary inhabitants by the time Europeans arrived, living along Alum Creek. They were forced out of Ohio in 1843.

=== Post-Ohio statehood ===
The land that is today Westerville was settled by those of European ancestry around 1810. Garrit Sharp and his family were the first to establish a residence in what is now Westerville city limits and the settlement was known as Sharp's Settlement. In 1818, Matthew, Peter, and William Westervelt, settlers of Dutch extraction, migrated to the area from New York. Matthew Westervelt donated land for the construction of a Methodist church in 1836, and the settlement was subsequently named in the family's honor. In 1839, the Blendon Young Men's Seminary was chartered in Westerville; Matthew Westervelt was one of its first trustees. The Church of the United Brethren in Christ bought the seminary in 1846, and the next year the seminary was reformed, and renamed Otterbein College after the church's founder Philip William Otterbein. It continues today in Westerville as the private Otterbein University.

Westerville was platted by 1856, and officially incorporated in August 1858. The town's population in that year was 275.

Throughout the Antebellum era, several homes in Westerville were stations on the Underground Railroad. Among these is the Hanby House, located one block from the college. Benjamin Russell Hanby had moved to Westerville in 1849, at the age of sixteen, to enroll at Otterbein University. Hanby went on to write many familiar hymns and songs, among them "Darling Nelly Gray" (inspired by his sympathy for Southern slaves), "Who is He in Yonder Stall?", and the Christmas favorite "Up On The Housetop". His home in Westerville, listed on the National Register of Historic Places, was dedicated as a museum in 1937 and is now owned by the Ohio Historical Society and managed locally by the Westerville Historical Society. It is the only state memorial to a composer in the state of Ohio.

=== "Dry Capital of the World" ===
An 1859 town ordinance prohibited sales of alcohol in Westerville. By the 1870s, a burgeoning conflict between pro- and anti-temperance forces boiled over into the so-called "Westerville Whiskey Wars". Twice, in 1875 and 1879, businessman Henry Corbin opened a saloon in Westerville, and each time the townspeople blew up his establishment with gunpowder. Westerville's reputation for temperance was so significant that in 1909 the Anti-Saloon League moved its national headquarters from Washington, D.C. to Westerville. The League, at the forefront of the Prohibition movement, gained its greatest triumph when the Eighteenth Amendment to the United States Constitution was ratified in 1919. The League printed so many leaflets in support of temperance and prohibition—over 40 tons of mail per month—that Westerville, by then known as "The Dry Capital of the World", was the smallest town in the nation to have a first class post office. The League's Westerville headquarters was given to the Westerville Public Library in 1973 and now serves as a museum attached to the library. After Prohibition ended, Westerville remained dry for most of the twentieth century.

=== Since 1915 ===
In 1916, Westerville became the first village (and second municipality) in Ohio to adopt a council-manager form of government, in which a city council makes policy but the town's administrative and many of its executive governmental functions are vested in an appointed, professional manager. Westerville retains the council-manager system to the present day. The city elects seven council members at large for four-year terms; the council selects from among its own a member to serve as mayor, vice mayor, chair, and vice chair. Under the City Charter, the mayor is only "the ceremonial head of the government" of the city. The council additionally selects the city manager, who serves indefinitely. In 2007, David Collinsworth replaced David Lindimore as city manager after the latter's tenure of twenty-two years. Collinsworth retired in January 2021 alongside assistant City Manager Julie Colley.

In 1995, the city annexed 941 non-dry acres of land to its north, which included several alcohol-selling businesses. Subsequently, voters have approved alcohol sales in old Westerville at a number of establishments through site-specific local options. In 2006 Michael's Pizza served the first beer in Uptown Westerville in over 70 years. On October 15, 2019, Westerville hosted the fourth 2020 Democratic Primary Presidential Debate which had over 12 candidates on stage. To date, it is the largest primary debate in American history. In 2020 Westerville was named as the best suburban city in America based on a study conducted by Movoto Real Estate. The study, which surveyed criteria such as cost of living and crime, compared Westerville to 75 geographically diverse suburban cities across the nation.

== Geography ==
According to the United States Census Bureau, the city has a total area of 12.61 square miles (32.66 km^{2}), of which 12.47 square miles (32.30 km^{2}) is land and 0.14 square miles (0.36 km^{2}) is water.

=== Climate ===
Climate data for Westerville, Ohio, 1991–2020 normals, extremes 1897–present
Month	Jan	Feb	Mar	Apr	May	Jun	Jul	Aug	Sep	Oct	Nov	Dec	Year
Record high °F (°C)	70 (21)	77 (25)	85 (29)	88 (31)	95 (35)	100 (38)	103 (39)	101 (38)	101 (38)	93 (34)	81 (27)	76 (24)	103 (39)
Mean maximum °F (°C)	59.5 (15.3)	63.3 (17.4)	72.7 (22.6)	81.5 (27.5)	87.7 (30.9)	92.4 (33.6)	92.6 (33.7)	91.9 (33.3)	89.9 (32.2)	82.4 (28.0)	69.8 (21.0)	64.6 (18.1)	93.8 (34.3)
Mean daily maximum °F (°C)	37.7 (3.2)	42.0 (5.6)	52.6 (11.4)	66.3 (19.1)	75.5 (24.2)	83.2 (28.4)	85.9 (29.9)	84.6 (29.2)	79.1 (26.2)	67.3 (19.6)	53.4 (11.9)	42.1 (5.6)	64.1 (17.9)
Daily mean °F (°C)	29.9 (−1.2)	33.0 (0.6)	42.3 (5.7)	54.1 (12.3)	63.9 (17.7)	72.2 (22.3)	75.4 (24.1)	73.8 (23.2)	67.6 (19.8)	56.0 (13.3)	44.2 (6.8)	34.6 (1.4)	53.9 (12.2)
Mean daily minimum °F (°C)	22.0 (−5.6)	24.0 (−4.4)	31.9 (−0.1)	41.9 (5.5)	52.4 (11.3)	61.1 (16.2)	64.9 (18.3)	63.1 (17.3)	56.0 (13.3)	44.7 (7.1)	34.9 (1.6)	27.0 (−2.8)	43.7 (6.5)
Mean minimum °F (°C)	−1.8 (−18.8)	2.9 (−16.2)	12.3 (−10.9)	25.2 (−3.8)	35.7 (2.1)	46.0 (7.8)	53.2 (11.8)	51.6 (10.9)	41.2 (5.1)	29.2 (−1.6)	18.7 (−7.4)	8.8 (−12.9)	−4.8 (−20.4)
Record low °F (°C)	−27 (−33)	−25 (−32)	−10 (−23)	13 (−11)	23 (−5)	30 (−1)	41 (5)	36 (2)	29 (−2)	16 (−9)	−9 (−23)	−25 (−32)	−27 (−33)
Average precipitation inches (mm)	2.93 (74)	2.36 (60)	3.42 (87)	3.91 (99)	4.22 (107)	5.02 (128)	4.56 (116)	3.64 (92)	3.29 (84)	2.95 (75)	2.88 (73)	3.05 (77)	42.23 (1,072)
Average snowfall inches (cm)	6.9 (18)	5.3 (13)	2.8 (7.1)	0.1 (0.25)	0.0 (0.0)	0.0 (0.0)	0.0 (0.0)	0.0 (0.0)	0.0 (0.0)	0.0 (0.0)	0.5 (1.3)	3.4 (8.6)	19.0 (48)
Average precipitation days (≥ 0.01 in)	13.3	10.9	12.4	13.6	13.7	12.0	11.5	9.4	9.0	10.6	11.1	12.6	140.1
Average snowy days (≥ 0.1 in)	6.2	4.6	1.9	0.1	0.0	0.0	0.0	0.0	0.0	0.0	0.6	3.3	16.7
Source 1: NOAA
Source 2: National Weather Service

== Demographics ==
Historical population
Census	Pop.	Note	%±
1860	668		—
1870	741		10.9%
1880	1,148		54.9%
1890	1,329		15.8%
1900	1,462		10.0%
1910	1,903		30.2%
1920	2,480		30.3%
1930	2,879		16.1%
1940	3,146		9.3%
1950	4,112		30.7%
1960	7,011		70.5%
1970	12,530		78.7%
1980	22,960		83.2%
1990	30,269		31.8%
2000	35,318		16.7%
2010	36,120		2.3%
2020	39,190		8.5%
Sources: 2020

=== 2020 census ===
As of the 2020 census, Westerville had a population of 39,190. The median age was 41.7 years. 21.3% of residents were under the age of 18 and 21.1% of residents were 65 years of age or older. For every 100 females there were 88.6 males, and for every 100 females age 18 and over there were 85.4 males age 18 and over.

There were 15,344 households in Westerville, of which 30.2% had children under the age of 18 living in them. Of all households, 57.4% were married-couple households, 12.2% were households with a male householder and no spouse or partner present, and 26.3% were households with a female householder and no spouse or partner present. About 26.3% of all households were made up of individuals and 14.4% had someone living alone who was 65 years of age or older.

There were 15,872 housing units, of which 3.3% were vacant. The homeowner vacancy rate was 0.4% and the rental vacancy rate was 6.0%.

100.0% of residents lived in urban areas, while 0.0% lived in rural areas.

Racial composition as of the 2020 census
Race	Number	Percent
White	32,207	82.2%
Black or African American	3,031	7.7%
American Indian and Alaska Native	79	0.2%
Asian	1,124	2.9%
Native Hawaiian and Other Pacific Islander	6	0.0%
Some other race	427	1.1%
Two or more races	2,316	5.9%
Hispanic or Latino (of any race)	1,148	2.9%

=== 2010 census ===
As of the census of 2010, there were 36,120 people, 13,859 households, and 9,800 families living in the city. The population density was 2,896.6 inhabitants per square mile (1,118.4/km^{2}). There were 14,467 housing units at an average density of 1,160.1 units per square mile (447.9 units/km^{2}). The racial makeup of the city was 88.6% White, 6.4% African American, 0.2% Native American, 2.3% Asian, 0.5% from other races, and 2.1% from two or more races. Hispanic or Latino of any race were 1.9% of the population.

There were 13,859 households, of which 31.9% had children under the age of 18 living with them, 58.7% were married couples living together, 9.1% had a female householder with no husband present, 2.9% had a male householder with no wife present, and 29.3% were non-families. 24.4% of all households were made up of individuals, and 10.6% had someone living alone who was 65 years of age or older. The average household size was 2.48 and the average family size was 2.96.

The median age in the city was 41.2 years. 22.4% of residents were under the age of 18; 10.1% were between the ages of 18 and 24; 22.2% were from 25 to 44; 31.1% were from 45 to 64; and 14.3% were 65 years of age or older. The gender makeup of the city was 47.0% male and 53.0% female.

=== 2000 census ===
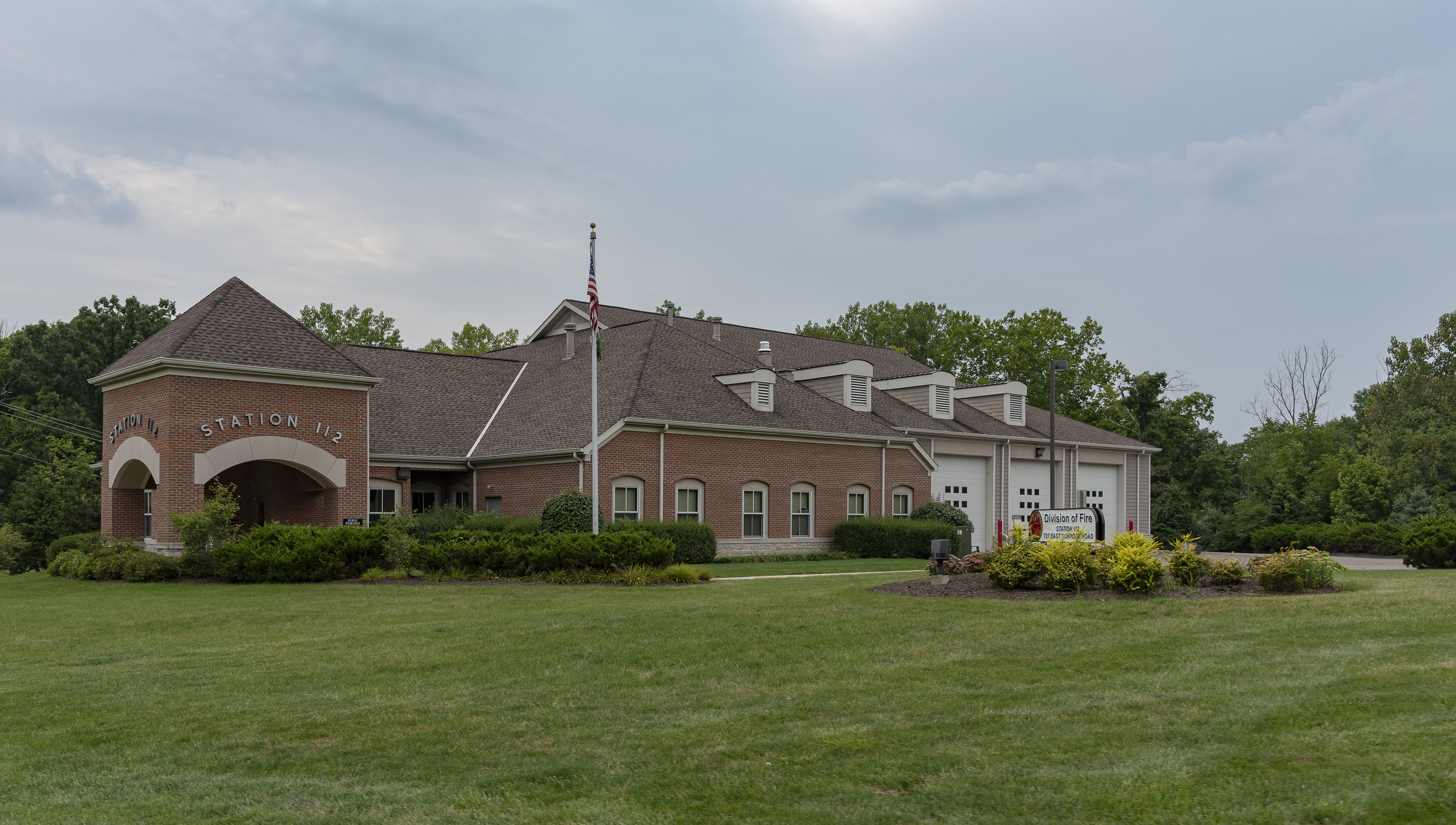
Westerville Fire Station 112

As of the census of 2000, there were 35,318 people, 12,663 households, and 9,547 families living in the city. The population density was 2,851.1 inhabitants per square mile (1,100.8/km^{2}). There were 13,143 housing units at an average density of 1,061.0 units per square mile (409.7 units/km^{2}). The racial makeup of the city was 93.54% White, 3.20% African American, 0.13% Native American, 1.55% Asian, 0.03% Pacific Islander, 0.36% from other races, and 1.19% from two or more races. Hispanic or Latino of any race were 1.07% of the population.

There were 12,663 households, out of which 39.3% of those had children under the age of 18 living with them, 64.8% were married couples living together, 8.3% had a female householder with no husband present, and 24.6% were non-families. 20.9% of all households were made up of individuals, and 8.0% had someone living alone who was 65 years of age or older. The average household size was 2.67 and the average family size was 3.11.

In the city the population was spread out, with 26.9% under the age of 18, 9.1% from 18 to 24, 27.1% from 25 to 44, 26.5% from 45 to 64, and 10.4% who were 65 years of age or older. The median age was 38 years. For every 100 females, there were 90.3 males. For every 100 females age 18 and over, there were 84.9 males.

The median income for a household in the city was $69,135, and the median income for a family was $82,163. Males had a median income of $55,053 versus $36,510 for females. The per capita income for the city was $29,401. About 2.5% of families and 3.5% of the population were below the poverty line, including 3.5% of those under the age of 18 and 5.0% of those ages 65 and older.

== Education ==
Otterbein University, a private four-year liberal arts college, was founded by the United Brethren Church in 1847 and is now home to over 3,000 students. The United Brethren Church has since merged with the Methodist Church and is now the United Methodist Church, with which the college continues to be affiliated.

Other colleges and universities in Westerville Ohio include Hondros College, Franklin University (branch), Dominion University, The Ohio State School of Cosmetology, Columbus State Westerville Center (branch) and Fortis College.

Westerville is served by the Westerville City School District. The district operates three high schools: Westerville South High School, an International Baccalaureate School, which opened in 1960 as Westerville High School; Westerville North High School (opened 1975); and Westerville Central High School (opened 2003). In addition, Westerville has five middle and sixteen elementary schools. The middle schools are Blendon, Genoa, Heritage, Minerva Park, and Walnut Springs. The elementary schools are Emerson (a magnet school that opened in 1896 as the Vine Street School), Hanby (magnet), Longfellow, Alcott, Annehurst, Cherrington, Fouse, Hawthorne, Huber Ridge, Mark Twain, McVay, Minerva France, Pointview, Robert Frost, Whittier, and Wilder.

== Transportation ==
In the early days before the town's incorporation, Westerville was connected to Columbus by a plank road with a toll of ten cents. Today, Westerville borders Interstate 71 and Interstate 270 (the Columbus Outerbelt), expressways that connect it with Columbus and other suburbs. Via the interstates, central Westerville is 16 miles (26 km) from downtown Columbus and 12 miles (19 km) from John Glenn Columbus International Airport, Central Ohio's primary terminal for air passengers. State Route 3, the "3-C Highway" which connects Cleveland, Columbus, and Cincinnati, is the chief north–south thoroughfare of the old town center, known as Uptown Westerville, through which it is called State Street.

Streetcars plied the avenues of Westerville from the late nineteenth century but service was discontinued in 1929. Today, Westerville offers little in the way of public transportation. The city itself operates no public buses, but the Central Ohio Transit Authority (COTA) serves Westerville with five bus lines.

== Economy ==
T. Marzetti Company and its parent Lancaster Colony Corporation, as well as Mac Tools are headquartered in Westerville.

=== Top employers ===
According to Westerville's 2023 Annual Comprehensive Financial Report, the top employers in the city are:

#	Employer	# of employees
1	JP Morgan Chase	3,471
2	Mount Carmel Health System	3,293
3	Westerville City Schools	1,836
4	Otterbein University	1,533
5	Central Ohio Primary Care Physician	1,157
6	Exel	1,058
7	OhioHealth	1,001
8	City of Westerville	887
9	ESC of Central Ohio	828
10	Connexions Loyalty Acquisition	676

== Notable people ==
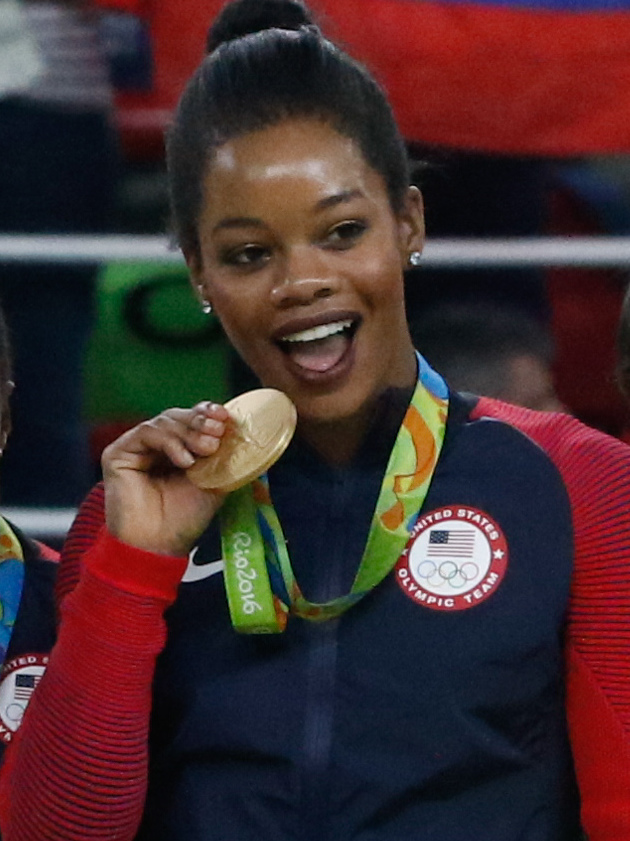
Gabby Douglas

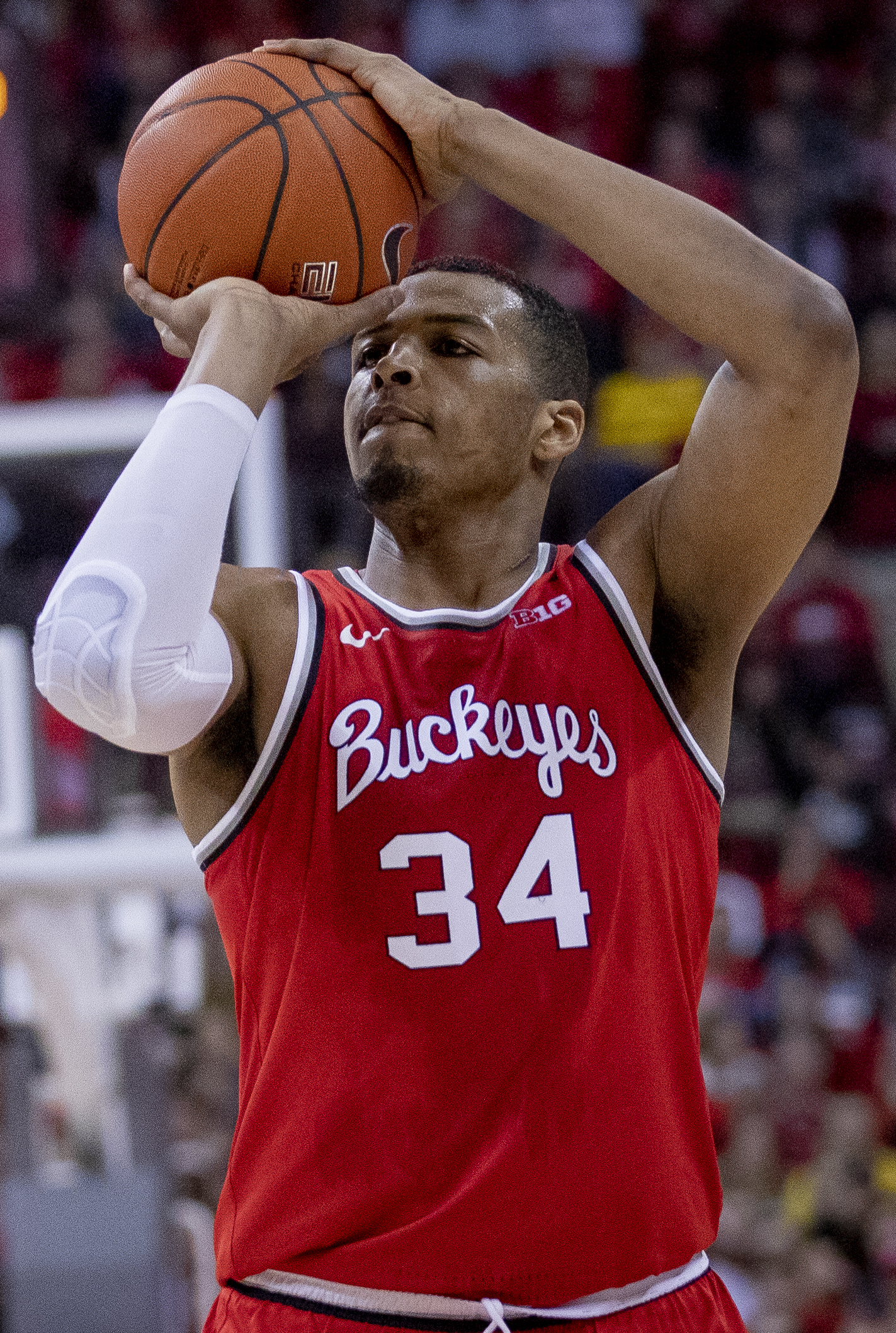
Kaleb Wesson

- Sebastian Berhalter (born 2001) — soccer player
- Tim Bezbatchenko (born 1981) — soccer player and sports executive
- Steven Boyer — theatre and television actor
- Ki-Jana Carter — NFL running back
- The Crimson Armada — Extreme Metal band
- Jim Day — host of Reds Live for the Cincinnati Reds
- Buster Douglas — boxer
- Gabby Douglas (born 1995) — gymnast and 2012 Olympic gold medalist
- Johnny Franck - solo musician (Bilmuri)
- Mark Grimsley (born 1959) — American historian
- Benjamin Hanby — 19th-century composer
- Nigel Hayes, Professional basketball player for the Phoenix Suns
- Jennifer Hetrick — actor, Star Trek: The Next Generation
- Abhijat Joshi — Bollywood screenplay/script writer
- Andy Katzenmoyer — football player with the New England Patriots
- Nick Kellogg — basketball player for Paris Basketball and Ohio University
- Bob Kennedy — two-time Olympian (1992, 1996)
- John William Lambert — early automotive pioneer and automobile manufacturer
- Perry L. Miles — U.S. army brigadier general, born in Westerville
- Lance Moore — wide receiver for the Detroit Lions; Super Bowl Champion with the New Orleans Saints
- Nick Moore — wide receiver for the Winnipeg Blue Bombers
- Dan O'Brien — General Manager, Cincinnati Reds
- Lauren Schmidt Hissrich (born 1978) — television writer
- Caleb Shomo — musician and member of Beartooth and Attack Attack!
- Benny Snell (born 1998) — running back for the Pittsburgh Steelers
- Nick Vannett — tight end for the New Orleans Saints, former tight end for Ohio State University
- Kaleb Wesson (born 1999) — basketball player for Maccabi Rishon LeZion of the Israeli Basketball Premier League
- Andre Wesson (born 1997) — former basketball player for Ohio State University
- Chris Stoll (born 1998) - NFL long snapper for Seattle Seahawks, former long snapper Penn State University (captain 2022, Patrick Mannelly Award winner 2022)
