= Public Library of Youngstown and Mahoning County =

Library serving Mahoning County, Ohio

Logo of the Public Library of Youngstown and Mahoning County

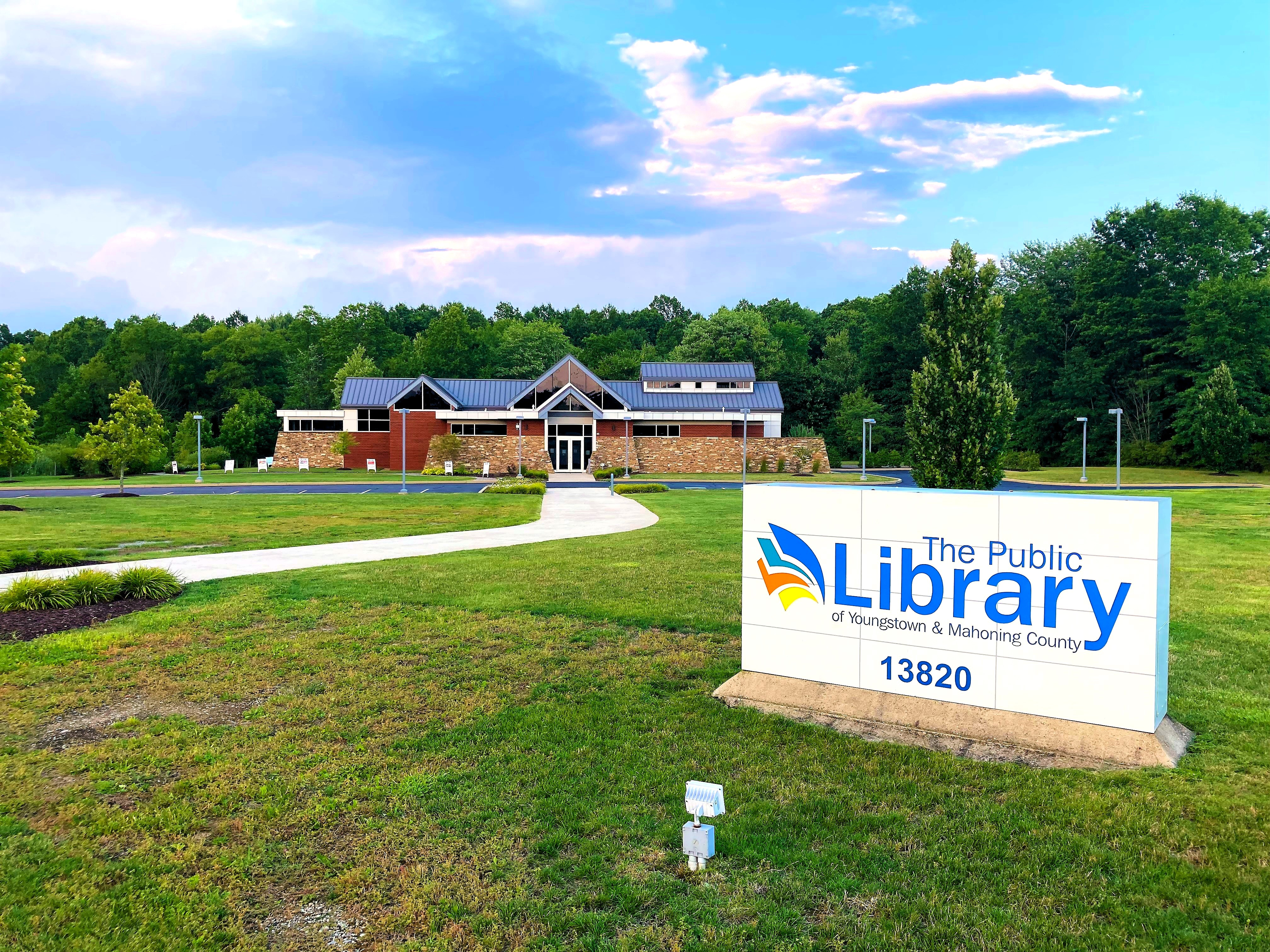
The North Jackson Branch

The Public Library of Youngstown and Mahoning County has 15 branches that serve 10 communities in Mahoning County, Ohio.

In 2005, the library loaned more than 1.8 million items to its 122,000 cardholders. Total holdings are over 686,000 volumes with over 1,100 periodical subscriptions.

The library has branches in Austintown, Boardman, Campbell, Canfield, New Middletown, North Jackson, Sebring, and Youngstown. The library's administrative office is located inside the main branch in Youngstown.

== Services ==
Since 1971, the library has provided a service called Special Delivery which includes delivering library materials to homebound people and children, and recorded materials and playback equipment to disabled people.

The library has a mobile library called the Pop-Up Library which makes stops at various locations around the county. It can also be requested for events.

The library has a service called Book-A-Librarian where one can book an appointment with a librarian for assistance.

The library has many electronic resources. The library has an extensive online collection of materials relating to genealogy and local history, which mainly includes material from Mahoning, Trumbull, and Columbiana counties. Every branch has computers, printers, fax machines, and e-book/audio book lending services. Some branches also have 3D printers and Wi-Fi hotspots.

As a part of the Michael Kusalaba branch located on Mahoning Avenue in Youngstown, the Makerspace was created. In addition to providing digital archiving material such as film reel converters and media conversion equipment, one can also access a laminator, button maker, laser engraver, vinyl printer and sound studio.

== Renovations ==
In 2020, the library began undertaking a large construction and renovation project on its main branch in Youngstown. The project cost $27 million and consisted of creating a new entrance on Wick Avenue to match the original entrance from 1910, a new computer lab and an area for people to receive computer training, a digitization lab, additional shelving and study rooms. It also included the construction of a "Culinary Literacy Center."
