= Westerville South High School =

Location
- 303 South Otterbein Avenue; Westerville, (Franklin County), Ohio 43081; United States; 40.11782°N 82.92252°W

Information
- Type: Public high school
- Established: 1960
- School district: Westerville City Schools
- Superintendent: Angela Hamberg
- CEEB code: 365430
- Principal: Mike Hinze
- Teaching staff: 90.43 (FTE)
- Grades: 9-12
- Average class size: 20
- Student to teacher ratio: 16.90
- Colors: Red, white and black
- Fight song: Stand Up And Cheer
- Athletics conference: Ohio Capital Conference
- Team name: Wildcats
- National ranking: 2,888
- Yearbook: The Scribe
- Website: School Website

Westerville South High School is a public high school located in Westerville, Ohio, northeast of Columbus, Ohio. Originally called Westerville High School, it is the oldest of the three high schools in the Westerville City School District. It serves most of southern Westerville, as well as much of the portion of Columbus served by Westerville City Schools.

== History ==
Dedicated in 1960 as Westerville High School, it was renamed Westerville South High School in 1975 upon the opening of Westerville's second high school, Westerville North.

The principal of Westerville South is Mike Hinze. School colors are red and white. The school mascot is the Wildcat. Its CEEB code is 365430.

== Notable alumni ==
- Ki-Jana Carter - (Former #1 NFL Draft Pick)
- Jaelen Gill - (Former NFL Player)
- Traevon Jackson - (Professional Basketball Player)
- Jonathon Jennings - (Former Canadian Football League Player)
- Andy Katzenmoyer - (Former NFL Player)
- John Mackey (composer)
- Lance Moore - (Former NFL Player)
- Nick Moore – (Canadian football)
- Robert Pringle – (poet)
- Gigi Rice - (Actress)
- Brad Robbins (American football)
- Emmanuel Sabbi - (Professional Soccer Player)
- Andre Wesson - (Professional Basketball Player)
- Kaleb Wesson - (Professional Basketball Player)

== Ohio High School Athletic Association state championships ==
- Girls Soccer – 1994,1995
- Boys Soccer – 1989
- Boys Basketball - 2016
- Cheerleading - 1998, 2000, 2001, 2002, 2003

=== Male sports ===
- Baseball
- Basketball
- Cross country
- American football
- Lacrosse
- Soccer
  - D1 State Champions (1989)
- Swimming & Diving
- Tennis
- Track and Field
- Wrestling
- Bowling
  - OCC champions: (2010–11, 2011–12, 2013–14, 2014-15)
  - OHSAA Central District Champions (2013–14)

=== Female sports ===
- Basketball
  - 2018 & 2019 OCC champions
- Cheerleading
  - State champions (1998, 2000, 2001, 2002, 2003)
- Cross country
- Lacrosse
- Golf
- Soccer
  - D1 State champions (1994, 1995)
- Softball
- Swimming & diving
- Tennis
- Track and field
- Volleyball
- Bowling
  - OCC champions: (2013–14, 2014–15, 2016–17)
