= South-Western Career Academy =

Location
- 4750 Big Run South Road; Grove City, (Franklin County), Ohio 43123; United States
- Coordinates: 39°53′41″N 83°7′4″W

Information
- Type: Public high school
- Principal: Jamie Downy
- Grades: 11-12
- Website: http://www.swcsdcareertech.com/

South-Western Career Academy is a facility in which students of the four high schools in the South-Western City Schools district can choose to attend, starting in their Junior year.

== Affiliated schools ==
- Central Crossing High School
- Franklin Heights High School
- Grove City High School
- Westland High School
