= South-Western City School District (Franklin County, Ohio) =

School district in Ohio, United States

South-Western City Schools

Address
- 3805 Marlane Dr Grove City, Ohio, 43123; United States
- Coordinates: 39°52′41″N 83°04′41″W

District information
- Type: Public
- Grades: PreK–12
- Established: January 1, 1956; 70 years ago
- Superintendent: Randy Banks
- Schools: 34
- NCES District ID: 3904480

Students and staff
- Students: 21,924 (2025–2026)
- Teachers: 1,240.44 (on an FTE basis) (2025–2026)
- Staff: 2,552.01 (on an FTE basis) (2025–2026)
- Student–teacher ratio: 17.67 (2025–2026)
- Athletic conference: Ohio Capital Conference
- Colors: Blue and Green

Other information
- Website: www.swcs.us

South-Western City Schools (SWCS) is Ohio's fifth largest school district, located southwest of the city of Columbus. The district serves nearly 20,000 students throughout the southwest quadrant of Franklin County, including the cities of Galloway, Georgesville, Grove City, and Urbancrest. The district also serves all of Franklin, Jackson, Pleasant, and Prairie townships and a portion of Columbus.

The district operates fifteen elementary schools, five intermediate schools, five middle schools, four high schools, and a career academy.

== History ==
=== Early history ===
Only one high school was in existence in the area now called the South-Western City School District in 1954. Six boards of education governed the individual school districts serving the area. Population was growing rapidly then, as it has continued to do since. Schools were sorely pressed to meet the needs.

Only the Franklin Local District had a financial base adequate to support the growing demands. That situation came about because of the location of large industrial operations in the years just prior to 1936. A committee of citizens representing the six districts was formed, and meetings were held with members of the various boards of education, and with county and state officials.

On January 1, 1956, the South-Western Local School District was formed. It was a consolidation of five local systems and one exempted village school system. These were: the Grove City-Jackson Exempted Village District, the Franklin Township Local District, the Prairie Township Local District, the Pleasant Township Local District, the Urbancrest Village District, and the Georgesville Local District.

The consolidation was planned for: economy of operation; expediency to provide an adequate education for children of the area; opportunity because of the greater financial base of the newly combined school district; and potential for support of a quality school system.

Immediately following the creation of the new district, an additional tax levy for operation expenses was requested of voters and was approved. That same year, a bond issue to pay for construction of additional school buildings was also requested of voters, and was approved.

The years from 1957 to 1960 were tumultuous ones for the district. Population soared so that each year more than 1,000 new students entered the schools. This necessitated a huge financial outlay for additional buildings, the employment of teachers to staff the new classrooms, and the provision of adequate services.

The tax duplicate of the district also grew rapidly during these years, and fortunate it was, as the State of Ohio's participation in financing education in the district decreased from nearly 40 percent at the beginning of the period to less than 30 percent of the necessary costs by the end of the decade. During the same period, bond issues and tax levies requested of voters were not approved time after time at the ballot. Costs soared as new students continued to enroll in the district's schools. As the area became more heavily populated, Grove City changed from a village to a chartered city in 1958. On August 19, 1959, the Board of Education of South-Western Local Schools took action as outlined in law to change the status of the school system and the South-Western City School District was established.

=== 1960s–1970s and new high schools ===
By this time, public sentiment was so aroused by the obvious need of the schools that a major school operating tax levy, and shortly thereafter a bond issue for the construction of additional buildings, was approved. At that point, the South-Western City School District started to achieve a reputation as one of Ohio's most outstanding school districts. Continuously throughout the following seven years improvements were made within the district. Kindergarten and special programs began, vitally needed counseling and psychological services were added, and a technical and vocational program was greatly expanded. Culminating the achievements during this period was the building of the Paul C. Hayes Technical Training Center.

Changes in laws governing state participation in financing school districts brought a financial squeeze in 1968. During that time, cutbacks in personnel and services brought challenges to the school district. Cutbacks continued in 1969 and 1970 as the percentage of state participation in financing the South-Western City Schools continued to decline. Voters turned down requests for approval of additional operating levies – even though the school tax rates in the South-Western City School District have always been very low in comparison with other districts in Franklin County.

A crowning achievement of the district was the opening, during the 1970–1971 school year, of two new high schools: Westland High School and Grove City High School. These two buildings, planned to house two thousand students, were built in 1970–1971 at the amazing low cost of $18.98 per square foot, or a perpupil cost of $1,700. These buildings were classed by architects and educators as "ten years ahead of the times."

=== Turn of the 21st century and new construction bonds ===
To stem crisis-level overcrowding, in 1998 the district's voters passed one of the largest school construction bond issues in the history of Ohio. The issue made way for the construction of four intermediate schools (fifth and sixth grade buildings), a middle school, an additional high school, and a technical career center, as well as renovations to seven existing schools.

The first of the construction projects began with the renovations to the district's current high school auditoriums and fine arts areas. Auditoriums received substantial upgrades with new floor coverings, seating, lighting, and sound systems; and music education facilities were renovated and expanded. Considerable work was also done to the high school athletic facilities, with stadium expansions/upgrades, and renovations as needed to gyms, locker rooms, and weight-training facilities. All of the high school athletic fields also benefited from new, high-efficiency lighting.

The district's middle schools also saw significant improvements to auditoriums in the summer of 1999, with new seating, wall and floor coverings, lighting and sound systems. Once described as "eyesores," the auditoriums became functional, welcoming spaces for school and community use. The first four of the seven planned schools opened in January 2001, serving nearly 3,200 fifth and sixth grade students throughout the district. The intermediate schools not only eased the overcrowding at the elementary and middle schools, but they became models of cost-effective and efficient educational facilities. When the construction accounts closed on the first four intermediate schools, the completed projects were approximately $913,000 under their collective construction budgets. Not only were the buildings under budget, their capacity was increased by 100 students each in anticipation of higher enrollments than originally expected.

In the summer of 2001, the Board of Education dedicated Jackson Middle School. Jackson Middle School replaced Park Street Middle School (formerly known as the Jackson Township/Grove City High School building). Since 1928 the Jackson Township/Grove City High School building had been a fixture on Park Street. In keeping with district expectations, the project finished at more than $200,000 under its construction budget, with a 100-student greater capacity than originally planned.

The district's fourth high school, Central Crossing, completed its first year of operation with just freshmen, sophomores, and juniors in the school. Central Crossing High School saw its first graduating class in the Spring of 2004. The opening of the 272,000-square-foot (25,300 m^{2}), 1,800-student capacity school provided much-needed space at Franklin Heights, Grove City, and Westland High Schools, which had been critically overcrowded.

One of the unique community amenities provided at Central Crossing High School is the Central Crossing Branch of Southwest Public Libraries, which is available to the community when school is not in session.

The South-Western Career Academy also opened in the fall of 2002. The full-service career/technical school serves juniors and seniors from the South-Western City School District, offering them a wide array of traditional and non-traditional technical courses. Career Academy students access stateof- the-art programming and technology that helps to prepare them for either a career or college. The South-Western Career Academy is host to the nation's first AAA Sales and Service Office located within a school.

=== Recent history ===
As a result of the well-managed construction projects, taxpayers received one more building than anticipated. From the savings realized from the preceding projects, combined with interest earnings on investments, the district had the resources to convert Paul C. Hayes Technical School into an additional fifth and sixth grade school, Hayes Intermediate School. In 2009, the district closed two of its buildings - Harrisburg Elementary School and Kingston School, as part of its cost containment strategies. Also in 2009, the Auditor of State's office conducted a Performance Audit of the district. The district continues to aggressively pursue the implementation of the recommendations contained in the Performance Audit. Strategies and timelines have been developed to assist the district in this implementation process.

== Schools ==
=== Elementary Schools (Grades: K–4) ===
School	Nickname	Location	Colors	Established
Alton Hall	Cougar Cubs	Galloway, Ohio	Green & White	1960
Bolton Crossing	Thunders	Grove City, Ohio	Blue & Grey	2016
Buckeye Woods	Bobcats	Grove City, Ohio	Dark Blue & Gray	1995
Darby Woods	Cougar Cubs	Galloway, Ohio	Green & White	1995
Darbydale	Dolphins	Darbydale, Ohio	Navy Blue & White	1958
Finland	Eagles	Columbus, Ohio	Red & Blue	1958
Harmon	Hawks	Columbus, Ohio	Red & White	1950
Highland Park	Hurricanes	Grove City, Ohio	Blue & White	1969
JC Sommer	Jets	Grove City, Ohio	Red & White	1957
Monterey	Mustangs	Grove City, Ohio	Green & White	1963
Prairie Lincoln	Cardinals	Columbus, Ohio	Red & White	1957
Prairie Norton	Bulldogs	Columbus, Ohio	Purple & Gold	1951
Richard Avenue	Roadrunners	Grove City, Ohio	Blue & White	1958
Stiles	Wildcats	Columbus, Ohio	Blue & White	1963
West Franklin	Bear Cubs	Columbus, Ohio	Black & Blue	1954

==== Old Elementary Schools ====
- North Franklin Elementary School (1920–2016)
- Harrisburg Elementary School (1939–2008, Merged With Darbydale Elementary School)
- Kingston School (1949-1982 As An Elementary School, Repurposed As A Special School, Closed In 2009)
- Georgesville School (1958-1964 As An Elementary School, Repurposed As A Special School, Closed In 1982)
- Jackson Elementary School (1958-1964, Reopened In 1967, Closed In 1969)
- Urbancrest Elementary School (1958-1981)
- Wilson Elementary School (1958-1964, Reopened In 1965, Closed In 1966)

=== Intermediate Schools (Grades: 5–6) ===
School	Nickname	Location	Colors	Established
Franklin Woods	Bulldogs	Columbus, Ohio	Black & Silver	2001
Galloway Ridge	Bobcats	Galloway, Ohio	Navy Blue & Gray	2001
Hayes	Huskies	Grove City, Ohio	Navy Blue & White	2003
Holt Crossing	Rockets	Grove City, Ohio	Royal Blue & Silver	2001
Park Street	Timber Wolves	Grove City, Ohio	Navy Blue & Carolina Blue	2001

=== Junior High Schools (Grades: 7–8) ===
School	Nickname	Location	Colors	Established
Beulah Park	Broncos	Grove City, Ohio	Red & White	1964
Finland	Vikings	Columbus, Ohio	Blue & Gold	1964
Jackson	Jaguars	Grove City, Ohio	Red & Blue	2001
Norton	Wildcats	Columbus, Ohio	Royal Blue & White	1964
Pleasant View	Panthers	Grove City, Ohio	Green & Gold	1959

Old middle schools

Brookpark middle school 1964-2023

park street middle school 1970-2001

=== Senior High Schools (Grades: 9–12) ===
School	Nickname	Location	Colors	Established
Central Crossing	Comets	Grove City, Ohio	Royal Blue & Silver	2002
Franklin Heights	Golden Falcons	Columbus, Ohio	Black & Gold	1956
Grove City	Greyhounds	Grove City, Ohio	Crimson & Blue	1970
South-Western Career Academy	None	Grove City, Ohio	Maroon & Gold	2002
Westland	Cougars	Galloway, Ohio	Forest Green & White	1970

== Funding ==
They passed a property-tax school levy on their third try in May 2005, a drop in funding from the state as well as other factors such as a spike in gas prices forced the school district to make more than 14 million dollars in reductions after passing the levy. In November 2006 they attempted to pass another levy, a 1% income tax, it was defeated. Fortunately, due to a relatively warm winter and several other items, they only needed to cut one million dollars out of the following year's budget. They decided not to try to pass a levy in May 2007 in hopes that the state budget, re-done in summer of 2007, would provide more funding. The district was again on the ballot November 2008 for additional operating expenses and an Ohio School Facilities Commission building project with the state offering nearly $206 million in tobacco settlement funds to the district and again this bond issue and levy was defeated and the Ohio School Facilities Commission Funding is no longer available. The school board voted in February 2009 to cut all extra-curricular activities and high school busing as well as additional positions in order to shrink the district budget. The district went back on the ballot for another operating levy in May 2009 and again in August 2009 in hopes to reinstate these programs. Both attempts failed and the district started the 2009–2010 school year with no extra-curricular activities, high school busing, etc.

With a projected deficit for the 2009–2010 school year, another levy attempt was made for November 2009. Known as Issue 47, it was the last attempt for increased tax revenues in calendar year 2010 and the possible reinstatement of some extra-curricular activities for the remainder of the 2009–2010 school year. Without the passage of this levy, the district would not have been able to collect additional tax revenues in 2010 and would have continued to fall deeper into a deficit. The issue passed with 19,579 (50.58%) for to 19,130 (49.42%) against via the preliminary count results.

The School Board members are:

- Cathy Johnson
- Lee Schreiner
- Anthony Caldwell
- Kelli Martindale
- Chris Boso
