= Central Crossing High School =

Public, coeducational high school in Grove City, Ohio, United States

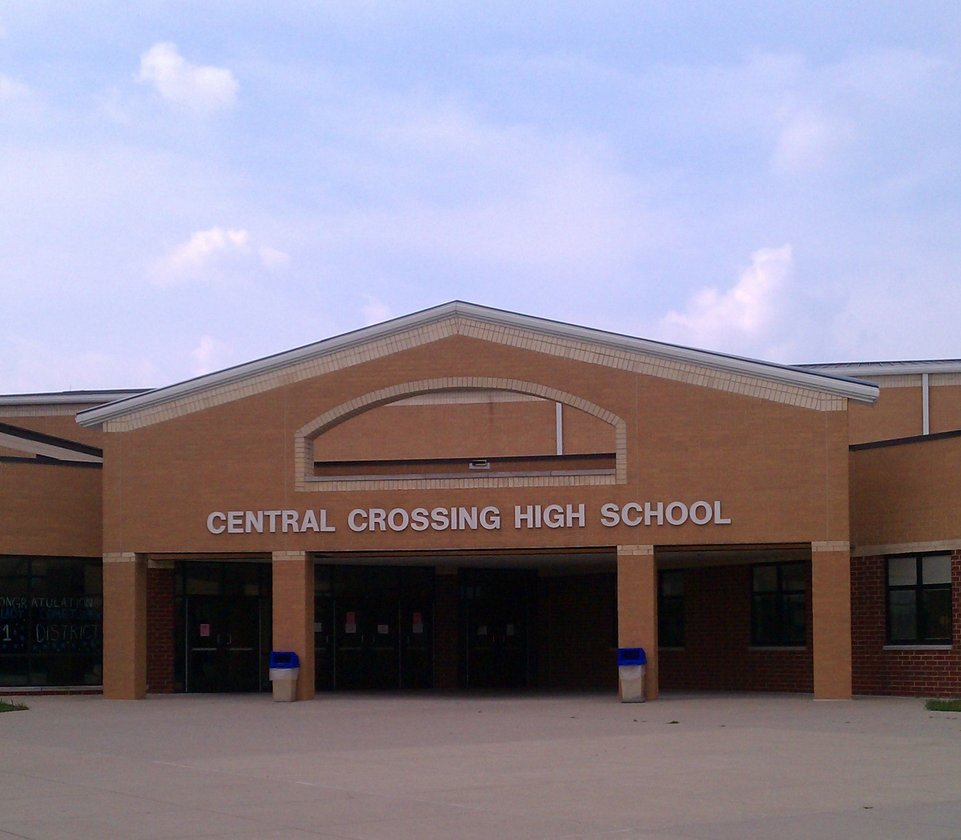
- Front entrance

Location
- 4500 Big Run South Road; Ohio; Grove City, (Franklin County), Ohio 43123; United States; 39°53′48″N 83°6′46″W

Information
- Type: Public, Coeducational high school
- Motto: Excelling in Excellence
- Established: 2002
- School district: South-Western City School District
- Superintendent: Randy Banks
- Principal: Steve Fairs
- Faculty: 90
- Teaching staff: 82.07 (FTE)
- Grades: 9-12
  - Other: 6
- Student to teacher ratio: 20.23
- Colors: Royal Blue and Silver
- Athletics conference: Ohio Capital Conference
- Nickname: Comets
- Rival: Grove City High School
- Accreditation: North Central Association of Colleges and Schools
- Communities served: Darbydale, Galloway, Grove City, Harrisburg
- Feeder schools: Pleasant View Middle School, Brookpark Middle School
- Website: CCHS website

Central Crossing High School is a high school in Grove City, Ohio. It is one of four high schools in the South-Western City Schools district, the others being Franklin Heights High School, Grove City High School, and Westland High School.

Central Crossing is the most recent high school to be built in the district. It first opened its doors for the 2002-03 academic year. The mascot for Central Crossing is the Comet, and its official colors are royal blue and silver. The school's motto is "Excelling in Excellence".

== History ==
The history of Central Crossing High School began with the passage of Issue 7 on November 3, 1998. A $128,000,000 bond issue, Issue 7 included the building of four new fifth/sixth grade buildings, one new high school, a replacement building for Park Street Middle School, a replacement building for the Hayes Technical School, additions, renovations, demolition of various district facilities, and acquiring land for school facilities. The issue passed with 17,003 votes in favor of the bond issue and 14,914 against the bond issue.

The groundbreaking for Central Crossing High School took place in 2000. The school officially opened its doors on August 28, 2002. Home to no seniors in its inaugural year, the school housed only 1,005 students. However, enrollment jumped to 1,415 the following school year after welcoming another freshman class.

=== 2009 levy failure ===
Due to a lack of funding stemming from the repeated failure to pass a proposed local tax levy, all extracurricular activities offered to the student body by the South-Western City Schools district were on hiatus. As of October 12, 2009 the district board of education approved a measure that allowed for pay-to-play participation, with activities are open to enrollment by students that contribute directly to its funding.

== Demographics ==
CCHS student enrollment
Year	Enrollment
'02-03	1,005
'03-04	1,415
'04-05	1,547
'05-06	1,635
'06-07	1,582
'07-08	1,683
'08-09	1,636
'09-10	1,593
'10-11	1,652
'11-12	1,618
'12-13	1,593
'13-14	1,655
'14-15	1,634

As of the 2014-2015 school year, there were 1,634 students attending the school according to the Ohio Department of Education. There were 471 students in grade 9, 432 in grade 10, 408 in grade 11, and 317 in grade 12. Six students were not classified in any grade. The racial makeup of the school was 70.7% White, 12.9% African American, 10.6% Hispanic or Latino, 3.4% multiracial, and 2.1% Asian. Less than 10 students declared themselves Native American. There were 823 males and 811 females. Approximately 47.9% of the students were classified as economically disadvantaged.

== Academics ==
As of the 2010-2011 school year, Central Crossing is currently designated as "Continuous Improvement" according to the Ohio Department of Education with 10 of 12 state indicators met. This is the third year in a row and fourth overall the school has achieved this rating. The school achieved the highest rating of "Excellent" during the 2003-2004 school year when it met all eligible state standards. The school has also been rated "Effective" on three occasions from 2004-2007.

== Extracurricular activities ==
=== Instrumental music ===
The Central Crossing High School Marching Band competes on a national level and has attended the Bands of America Grand National Championships in Indianapolis, IN and Super Regionals in St. Louis, Missouri. The band also performs on a local level throughout Ohio and participates actively in the Ohio Music Education Association (OMEA, an affiliate of the National Association for Music Education) marching competition circuit.

In 2006, the band placed 22nd overall and second in its class (AA) at Grand National Championships.

In 2007, the Central Crossing Marching Band became the only school from SWCS to be named a Bands of America Regional Champion. In doing so, they became the fourth different marching band from Ohio to have won a regional championship. The band competed with bands from four other states and 22 bands total.

In 2014, the Central Crossing Winterguard placed in 3rd place at the OIPA State Championships.

In 2015, the Central Crossing Indoor Percussion Ensemble won the WGI Dayton Regional in class PSA (Percussion Scholastic A). As a result, they became the only school from SWCS to ever win a WGI event. The ensemble received a score almost reaching the 90 point mark. The ensemble also became the only school in Central Columbus to get bumped up from PSA to PSO (Percussion Scholastic Open).

The affiliated Central Crossing Winterguard and Winter Drumline have also competed successfully.

In its inaugural year, the Winterguard competed to become Mid-East Performance Association (MEPA) State Championships in class Regional A. In 2007, the Winterguard retained their championship- this time in class Scholastic A- with their show 'Crossing the Line'. In April 2008, the guard won MEPA State Championships, class Scholastic A, a second time with their show 'Nella Fantasia'. For its 2009 season, the Winterguard was composed of 19 members performing to the music of Eva Cassidy and Bill Withers, in their show entitled "When He's Gone."

The Central Crossing Winter Drumline is another of the school's music programs receiving honors. In 2009, they placed second in the Scholastic Open class at a WGI Regional in Dayton, OH. They were also named the Scholastic Open MEPA Champions with their 2008 show 'Out of Balance'.

Central Crossing is also home to a growing orchestra program.

=== NJROTC ===
Central Crossing's NJROTC unit provides a color guard for various events hosted by the school, including athletic competitions. The unit also has a drill and rifle team for the students. The unit has received several awards and honors over the course of the school's history, including being recognized as a distinguished unit since 2003.

=== Theater department ===
The school's theater department puts on at least two shows a year, including a fall play and a spring musical. These performances take place in Palmer Auditorium, named for the school's first principal and great supporter of the arts, Ed Palmer, who has since retired. As of August 2009, the current theater director is Nathan Weaver.

=== Choral arts department ===
The choral arts department features a women's chorus, men's ensemble, concert choir, chorale, and the show choir "Excelsior". Excelsior and the chorale have won several awards, including best choral sound overall and runner-up overall. In 2016, the chorale made school history by receiving a I rating at OMEA District XV State-Level Large Group Adjudicated Event while competing in class A. Also in 2016, the department competed along with the concert band at Music in the Parks held at Cedar Point. Both the large group choir and Excelsior placed first in the competition, with the large group winning "Top Overall Choir".

== Athletics ==
The Central Crossing athletics teams compete in the Ohio Capital Conference - Central Division. Central Crossing High School sponsors 20 varsity sports (10 boys, 10 girls) competing in Division I.

=== Football ===
Since the school's inaugural season, the football program has struggled to find long-lasting success. In 2002, the school went 0-10 and has never attained more than 3 wins in a single season. Additionally, the school has had three different head coaches in nine seasons. In 2014, Central Crossing had a much improved season and participated in the high school playoffs for the first time.

=== Rivalries ===
The Central Crossing athletic teams currently have an intense geographic rivalry with intra-district school Grove City High School. The two schools are separated by only 4.7 miles and have competed against one another regularly in every sport since both teams became members of the Ohio Capital Conference Central Division in the fall of 2008.

=== Ohio Capital Conference championships ===
- Girls cross country - 2004
- Girls track - 2005
- Wrestling - 2006, 2008, 2009
- Girls softball - 2011, 2012, 2017
