= Reggie Gilliam =

American football player (born 1997)

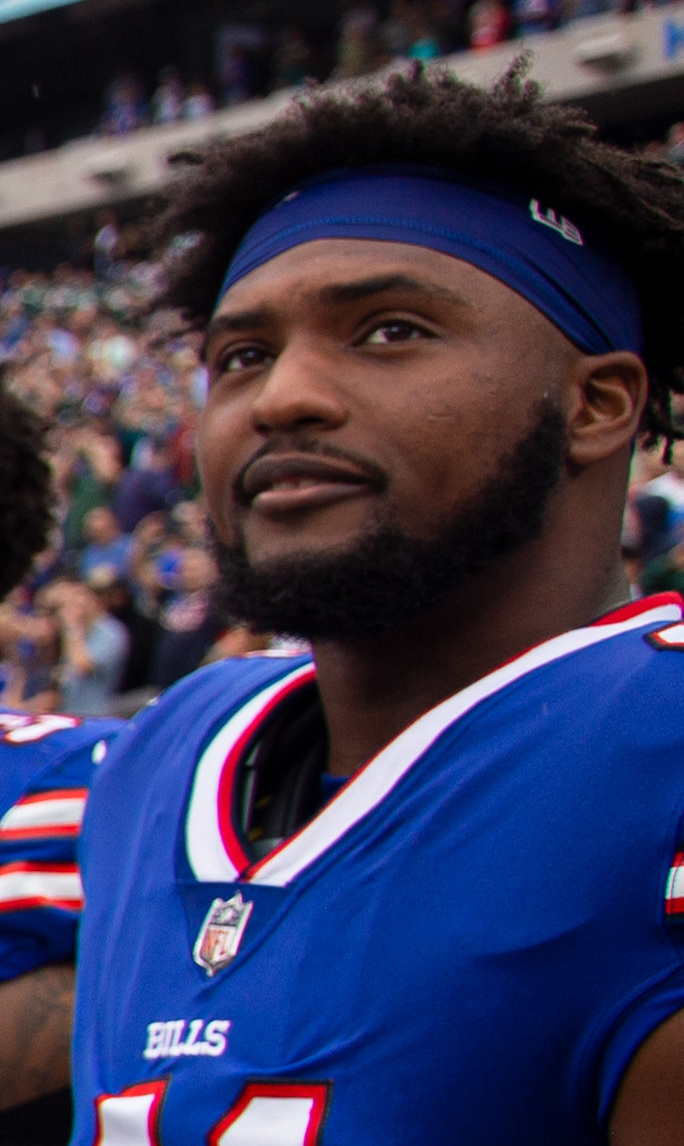
- Gilliam with the Buffalo Bills in 2022

No. 44 – New England Patriots
- Position: Fullback
- Roster status: Active

Personal information
- Born: August 20, 1997 (age 29); Columbus, Ohio, U.S.
- Listed height: 6 ft 1 in (1.85 m)
- Listed weight: 255 lb (116 kg)

Career information
- High school: Westland (Galloway, Ohio)
- College: Toledo (2016–2019)
- NFL draft: 2020: undrafted

Career history
- Buffalo Bills (2020–2025); New England Patriots (2026–present)

Awards and highlights
- Second-team All-MAC (2018)

Career NFL statistics as of Week 4, 2026
- Rushing yards: 14
- Rushing average: 1.8
- Receptions: 17
- Receiving yards: 139
- Receiving touchdowns: 2
- Total tackles: 29
- Forced fumbles: 2
- Stats at Pro Football Reference

Reggie Travon Gilliam (born August 20, 1997) is an American professional football fullback and special teamer for the New England Patriots of the National Football League (NFL). He played college football for the Toledo Rockets and signed with the Buffalo Bills as an undrafted free agent following the 2020 NFL draft. Gilliam played for the Bills from 2020 to 2025 and helped the Bills rank top 10 in the NFL for total rushing yards every season he played with the team before signing with the Patriots during the 2026 off-season.

== Early life ==
Gilliam grew up in Columbus, Ohio and attended Westland High School in Galloway, Ohio. As a senior, he rushed for 565 yards and eight touchdowns on 87 carries and had 18 catches for 280 yards and three touchdowns and was named first-team All-Ohio Capital Conference Central Division.

== College career ==
Gilliam was a member of the Toledo Rockets for four seasons, joining the team as a walk-on and playing tight end and fullback on offense while playing special teams. He led the nation with four blocked kicks as a junior in 2018 and was named second-team All-Mid-American Conference. Gilliam finished his collegiate career with 18 receptions for 153 yards and three touchdowns with six blocked kicks.

== Professional career ==
Pre-draft measurables
Height	Weight	Arm length	Hand span	Wingspan
6 ft 0 5/8 in (1.84 m)	244 lb (111 kg)	34 in (0.86 m)	9 1/4 in (0.23 m)	6 ft 7 3/8 in (2.02 m)
All values from Pro Day

=== Buffalo Bills ===
==== 2020 ====
Gilliam was signed by the Buffalo Bills as an undrafted free agent on April 25, 2020. He made the Bills' 53-man roster out of training camp as a replacement for veteran fullback Patrick DiMarco, who was released by the Bills during the 2020 offseason. Gilliam made his NFL debut in the Bills' season opener against the New York Jets on September 13, 2020. The following week on September 20, 2020, Gilliam caught a one-yard touchdown pass from Josh Allen for his first career reception in a 31–28 win over the Miami Dolphins.

Gilliam finished the 2020 season with two receptions for 16 yards and a touchdown along with two tackles and a forced fumble.

==== 2021 ====
Gilliam finished the 2021 season with three rushing attempts for three yards, three receptions for 23 yards, and three tackles.

==== 2022 ====
On August 7, 2022, Gilliam signed a two-year, $5.2 million contract extension with the Bills. He caught eight passes for 69 yards and a touchdown and recorded three tackles.

==== 2023 ====
In Week 11 of the 2023 season, Gilliam was named American Football Conference Special Teams Player of the Week after forcing a fumble on the opening kickoff. He finished the regular season with one reception for three yards along with three tackles and a forced fumble.

==== 2024 ====
Gilliam played in 15 games during the 2024 season and played 139 snaps on offense and 330 snaps on special teams. He recorded three rushing attempts for seven yards along with four tackles during the regular season.

==== 2025 ====
On March 11, 2025, Gilliam re-signed with the Bills on a one-year, $2 million contract.

=== New England Patriots ===
On March 12, 2026, Gilliam signed with the New England Patriots on a three-year, $12 million contract.

== NFL career statistics ==
Legend
**Bold**	Career best

=== Regular season ===
Year	Team	Games		Receiving					Rushing					Tackles			Fumbles	
Year	Team	GP	GS	Rec	Yds	Y/R	Lng	TD	Att	Yds	Y/A	Lng	TD	Cmb	Solo	Ast	Fum	Lost
2020	BUF	14	0	2	16	8.0	15	**1**	0	0	—	0	0	2	2	0	0	0
2021	BUF	16	5	3	23	7.7	8	0	**3**	3	1.0	2	0	3	1	2	0	0
2022	BUF	15	4	**8**	**69**	8.6	14	**1**	0	0	—	0	0	3	2	1	0	0
2023	BUF	17	0	1	3	3.0	3	0	0	0	0.0	0	0	3	2	1	0	0
2024	BUF	15	0	0	0	0	0	0	**3**	**7**	**2.3**	4	0	4	1	3	0	0
2025	BUF	17	2	2	24	**12.0**	**22**	0	2	4	2.0	**5**	0	**13**	**6**	**7**	0	0
Career		94	11	16	135	8.4	22	2	8	14	1.8	5	0	28	14	14	0	0

=== Postseason ===
Year	Team	Games		Receiving					Rushing					Tackles			Fumbles	
Year	Team	GP	GS	Rec	Yds	Y/R	Lng	TD	Att	Yds	Y/A	Lng	TD	Cmb	Solo	Ast	Fum	Lost
2020	BUF	3	0	0	0	—	0	0	0	0	—	0	0	**1**	0	**1**	0	0
2021	BUF	2	1	**3**	**12**	**4.0**	**7**	0	0	0	—	0	0	0	0	0	0	0
2022	BUF	2	0	0	0	—	0	0	0	0	—	0	0	0	0	0	0	0
2023	BUF	2	0	0	0	—	0	0	0	0	—	0	0	0	0	0	0	0
2024	BUF	3	0	0	0	—	0	0	0	0	—	0	0	**1**	0	**1**	0	0
2025	BUF	2	1	0	0	—	0	0	0	0	—	0	0	0	0	0	0	0
Career		14	2	3	12	4.0	7	0	0	0	—	0	0	2	0	2	0	0
