= Gary Burley =

American football player (born 1952)

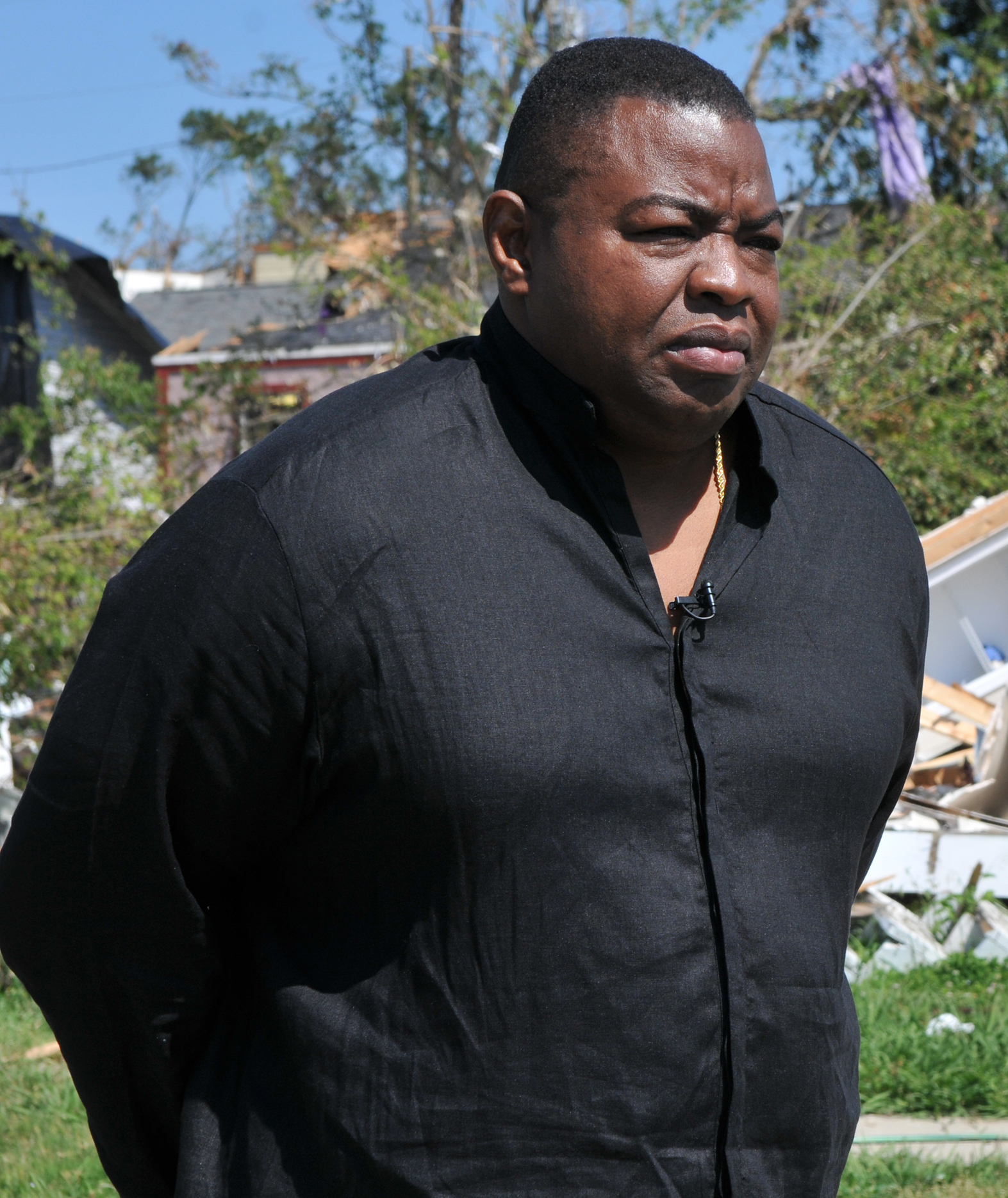
- Burley in 2011

No. 67, 73
- Position: Defensive end

Personal information
- Born: December 8, 1952 (age 73); Urbancrest, Ohio, U.S.
- Listed height: 6 ft 3 in (1.91 m)
- Listed weight: 272 lb (123 kg)

Career information
- High school: Grove City (Grove City, Ohio)
- College: Pittsburgh
- NFL draft: 1976: 3rd round, 55th overall pick

Career history
- Cincinnati Bengals (1976–1983); Atlanta Falcons (1984)

Awards and highlights
- PFWA All-Rookie Team (1976); First-team All-American (1974); First-team All-East (1974)

Career NFL statistics
- Sacks: 37
- Safeties: 1
- Stats at Pro Football Reference

Gary Steven Burley (born December 8, 1952) is an American former professional football player who played as a defensive end for the Cincinnati Bengals and Atlanta Falcons of the National Football League (NFL).

He played for the Bengals from 1976 to 1983, and the Atlanta Falcons in 1984.

== Early life ==
Gary Burley graduated from Grove City High School in Grove City, Ohio, near Columbus, in 1971.

== College career ==
After high school, Burley played football in 1971 and 1972 at Wharton County Junior College in Wharton, Texas. Burley was offered a scholarship to the University of Pittsburgh, where he was named a first-team All-American in 1974.

== Professional career ==
Burley was selected by the Bengals in the third round (55th overall) of the 1975 NFL draft. He was named to the 1976 NFL All-Rookie Team. He played in Super Bowl XVI in 1982, with the Bengals losing 26–21 to the San Francisco 49ers. In 8 seasons with Cincinnati, he played in 117 games, started 67, including all but 3 games his first 4 seasons.

His 9th and final NFL season was with the Atlanta Falcons, playing 12 games, starting 8.

== After football ==
In 2006, Burley founded the Pro Start Academy, a Birmingham, Alabama-based organization that "mentors young athletes and provides tips on how they can achieve success on and off the football field".

== Personal life ==
Between 2011 and 2015, Burley survived several life-threatening ailments including cancer, a bone marrow transplant, a bout of salmonella poisoning in his knee that put him in a wheelchair for six months, and the loss of a kidney. After 3 years of dialysis he received a kidney transplant and became an advocate for organ donations.

His wife is Bobbie Knight, a longtime Alabama Power executive and the president of Miles College. They reside in Birmingham, Alabama.

He hosts the Gary Burley Charity Golf Tournament at Greystone Country Club to benefit cancer research.
