= Ellen Walker Craig-Jones =

American politician (1906–2000)

5th Mayor of Urbancrest
- In office 1972–1975
- Preceded by: Vaughn E. Hairston
- Succeeded by: Vaughn E. Hairston

Personal details
- Born: Dollie Ellen Walker; June 5, 1906 Franklin County, Ohio, U.S.
- Died: January 23, 2000 (aged 93) Urbancrest, Ohio, U.S.
- Children: 1

Ellen Walker Craig-Jones (June 5, 1906 – January 23, 2000) was an American politician. She was inducted into the Ohio Women's Hall of Fame for "Government and Military Service." She was the first African American woman to be elected mayor of a United States municipality in 1972. She served as mayor of Urbancrest, Ohio, from 1972 until 1975.

== Life ==
Dollie Ellen Walker was born in Franklin County, Ohio, to Charles Oscar Walker and Weltha Belle Lee. She and her family lived in Jackson Township at the 1910 and 1920 censuses. She married James H. Craig in 1924. In 1930, she and her husband lived in Truro working as a cook and chauffeur for the Gugle family. By 1935, they lived in Jackson Township again through at least 1940. By 1950, they lived in Urbancrest with their son.

In 1960, Craig-Jones embarked on a political career and became a member of the Urbancrest Village Council. In 1971, Craig-Jones was elected Mayor of Urbancrest, Ohio, the first African American woman to be elected mayor by popular vote, and the first African American woman to be elected mayor of any municipality in the United States. Urbancrest had a population of less than 1,000 at the time she was nominated and was a predominantly poor and working-class African American town.

Upon taking office in 1972, Craig-Jones focused on modernizing the community. During her administration, Urbancrest received a three million dollar housing project for the town's poorer citizens. Craig-Jones also improved street lighting, installed signage, and repaired Urbancrest's streets. She remained in office until 1975.

She dedicated her life to improving conditions in her hometown of Urbancrest. At various points in her life, Craig-Jones founded or was a member of the Urbancrest Volunteer Civic Improvement Association, the Buckeye Boys Ranch, and the Urbancrest Chapter of the Blue Star Mothers of America. She was also actively involved with the Urbancrest Youth Council, the Urbancrest Community Recreation Club, and the Mid-Ohio Regional Planning Commission.

Ellen Walker Craig-Jones died on January 23, 2000, at the age of 93.
