= Gantz Homestead =

Historic house in Ohio, United States

- U.S. National Register of Historic Places
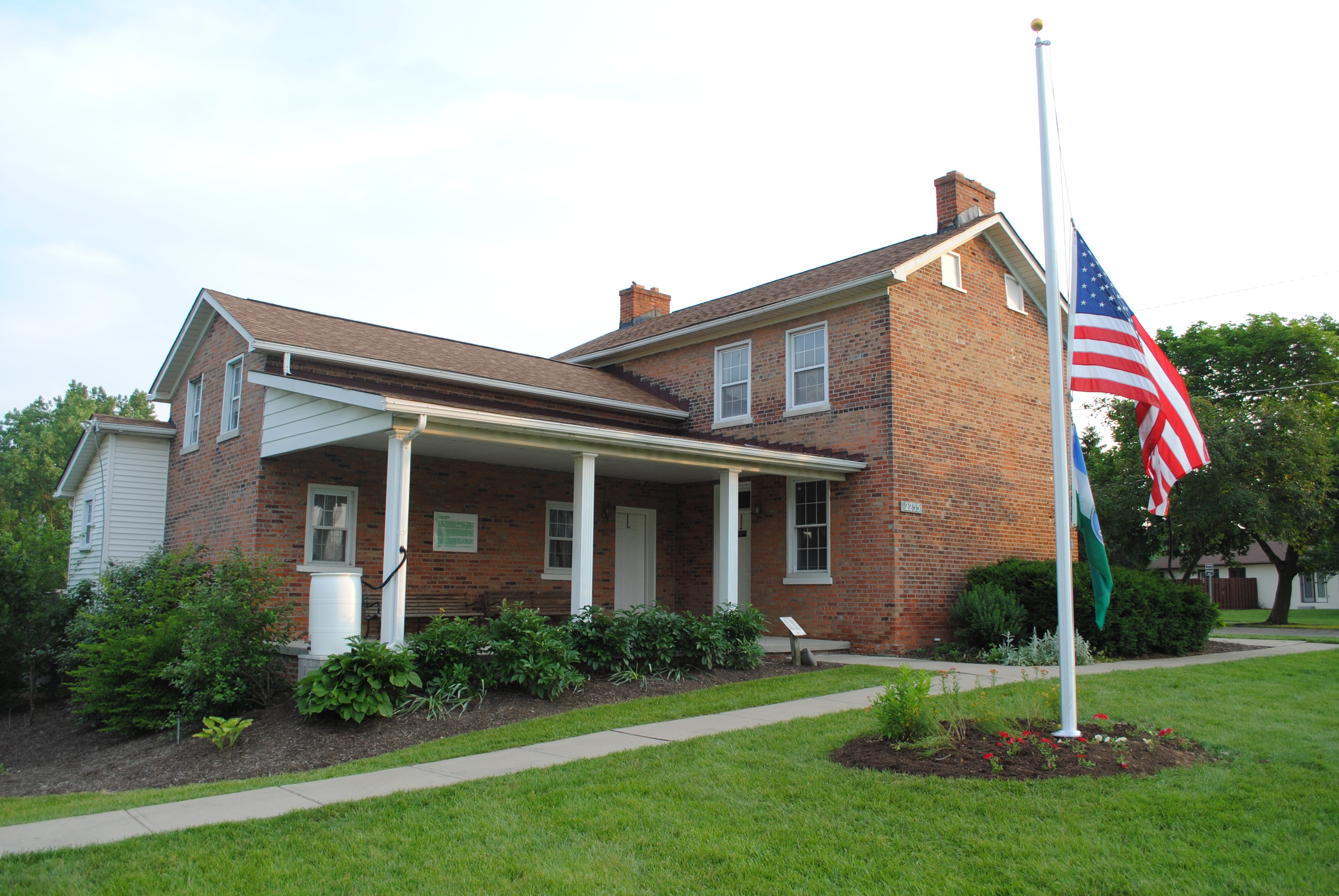

- Location within Ohio Location within the United States
- Interactive map showing the location for Gantz Homestead
- Nearest city: Grove City, Ohio
- Coordinates: 39°53′52″N 83°3′46″W
- Built: c. 1832
- Architect: Gantz, Adam
- NRHP reference No.: 79001842
- Added to NRHP: June 20, 1979

The Gantz Homestead, also called the Gantz Farm House, in Grove City, Franklin County, Ohio, United States, was built in or around 1832. It was listed on the U.S. National Register of Historic Places in 1979.

== History ==
Adam Johan Gantz was born in Washington County, Pennsylvania on May 10, 1805, to Andrew and Margaret (Harn) Gantz. In 1817, Andrew bought 200 acres of land in Franklin County, Ohio at what is now the southwest corner of Hoover and Home roads.

Adam married 16-year-old Catherine Pennix whose family was also from Washington County, Penn. on September 30, 1830. Two years later, he bought 100 acres of land and other property across Hoover Road and built the brick farm house. Today, the area is known as Gantz Park.

The Gantz family lived in the house until the land around it was donated to Grove City as a park in 1973. The last Gantz family member to own the property was Blodwen Jones Gantz, widow of William B. Gantz, Adam's grandson. Blodwen Circle on the south edge of the park is named for her.

== Materials ==
The farm house was made with materials found on the farm land. Clay was dug, mixed and cast into bricks, dried in the sun, and burned/baked in a "scove kiln." A tree was cut and turned into the center beam to hold the floor joists on the first floor. Lime and animal hair was used to create plaster.
