= Derek Combs =

American football player (born 1979)

No. 43, 45
- Position: Cornerback

Personal information
- Born: February 28, 1979 (age 47); Columbus, Ohio, U.S.
- Listed height: 6 ft 0 in (1.83 m)
- Listed weight: 185 lb (84 kg)

Career information
- High school: Grove City (OH)
- College: Ohio State
- NFL draft: 2001: 7th round, 228th overall pick

Career history
- Oakland Raiders (2001)*; Tennessee Titans (2001)*; Miami Dolphins (2001)*; Oakland Raiders (2001–2002); → Amsterdam Admirals (2002); Kansas City Chiefs (2003)*; Green Bay Packers (2003); Amsterdam Admirals (2004)
- * Offseason or practice squad member only

Career NFL statistics
- Games played: 12
- Kick returns: 5
- Yards: 71
- Longest: 25
- Stats at Pro Football Reference

Derek Alan Combs (born February 28, 1979) is an American former professional football player who was a cornerback in the National Football League (NFL) for the Oakland Raiders and Green Bay Packers. He played college football for the Ohio State Buckeyes.

== Early life ==
Combs graduated from Grove City High School in Grove City, Ohio, where he was the star tailback and was voted Ohio's Mr. Football in 1996. He has his own spot in the trophy case at Grove City High School.

== College career ==
He was a tailback in college for the Ohio State Buckeyes.

== Professional career ==
Combs was selected by the Oakland Raiders in the 7th round (228th overall pick) of the 2001 NFL draft as a cornerback. He played in four games for the Raiders in 2002 and eight games for the Green Bay Packers in 2003.
