= A.G. Grant Homestead =

Historic house in Ohio, United States

- U.S. National Register of Historic Places
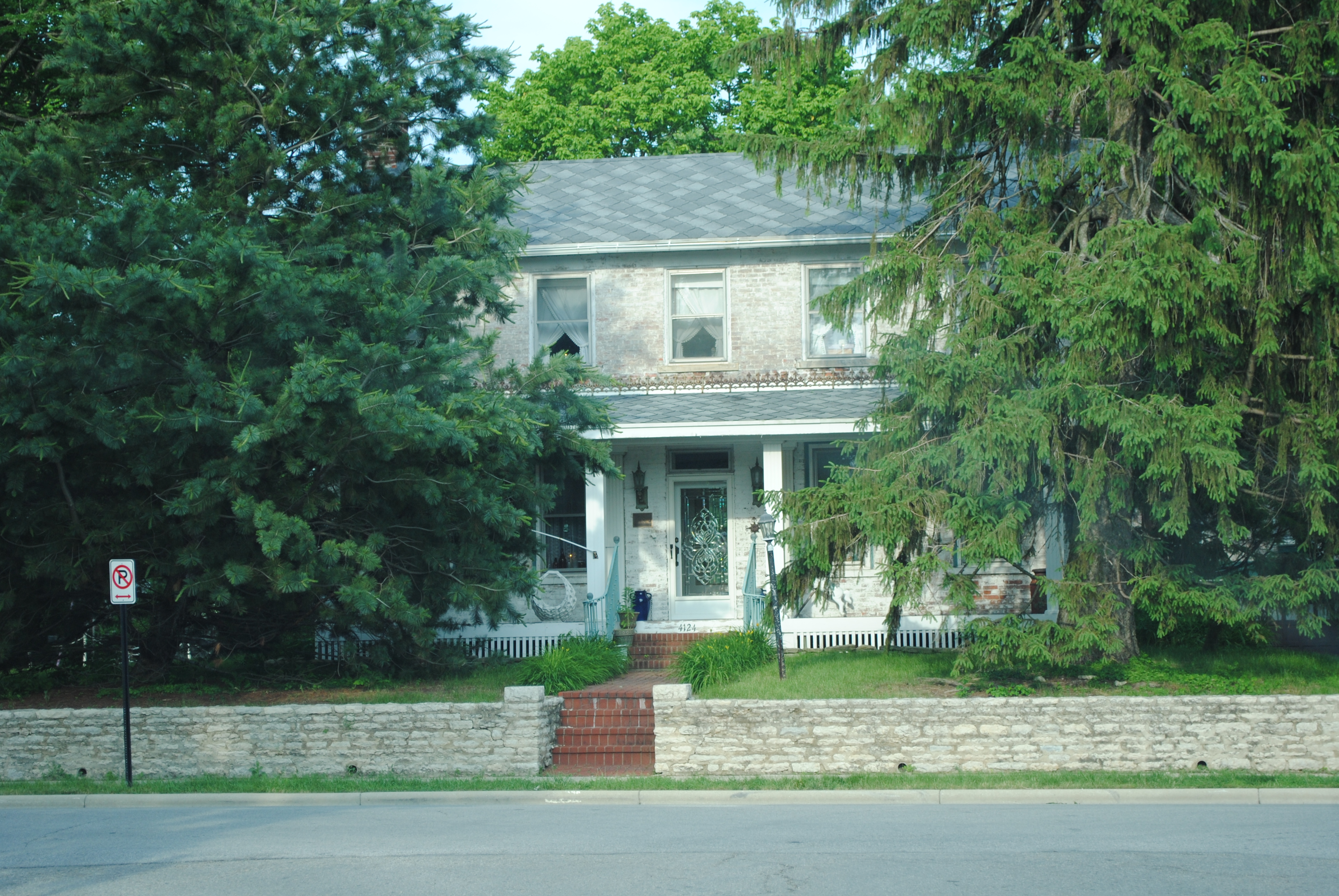

- Location within Ohio Location within the United States
- Interactive map showing the location for A.G. Grant Homestead
- Nearest city: Grove City, Ohio
- Coordinates: 39°52′48″N 83°5′7″W
- Built: 1840
- Architect: Gantz, A.G.
- NRHP reference No.: 74001488
- Added to NRHP: June 3, 1998

The A.G. Grant Homestead in Grove City, Franklin County, Ohio, United States, was built around 1840. It was listed on the U.S. National Register of Historic Places in 1998.

== History ==
Adam Gabriel Grant was one of the most influential residents of the Grove City area. He helped develop the interurban train system, bought the first bicycle and made Grove City's first long-distance call. He is seen in several photos with his signature bowler hat.

Prior to 1840, a log cabin existed on the property. This farm house built was built with clay found on the land and still stands on the end of Park Street on what is now Haughn Road. The last descendent of the family, Ruth V. Jividen, died on April 14, 2014, at the age of 98.

== Current status ==
The Government of Grove City purchased the home for the creation of a museum. It would cost about $1 million over 10 years to transform the property into a history museum.
