= Grove City, Ohio =

- City
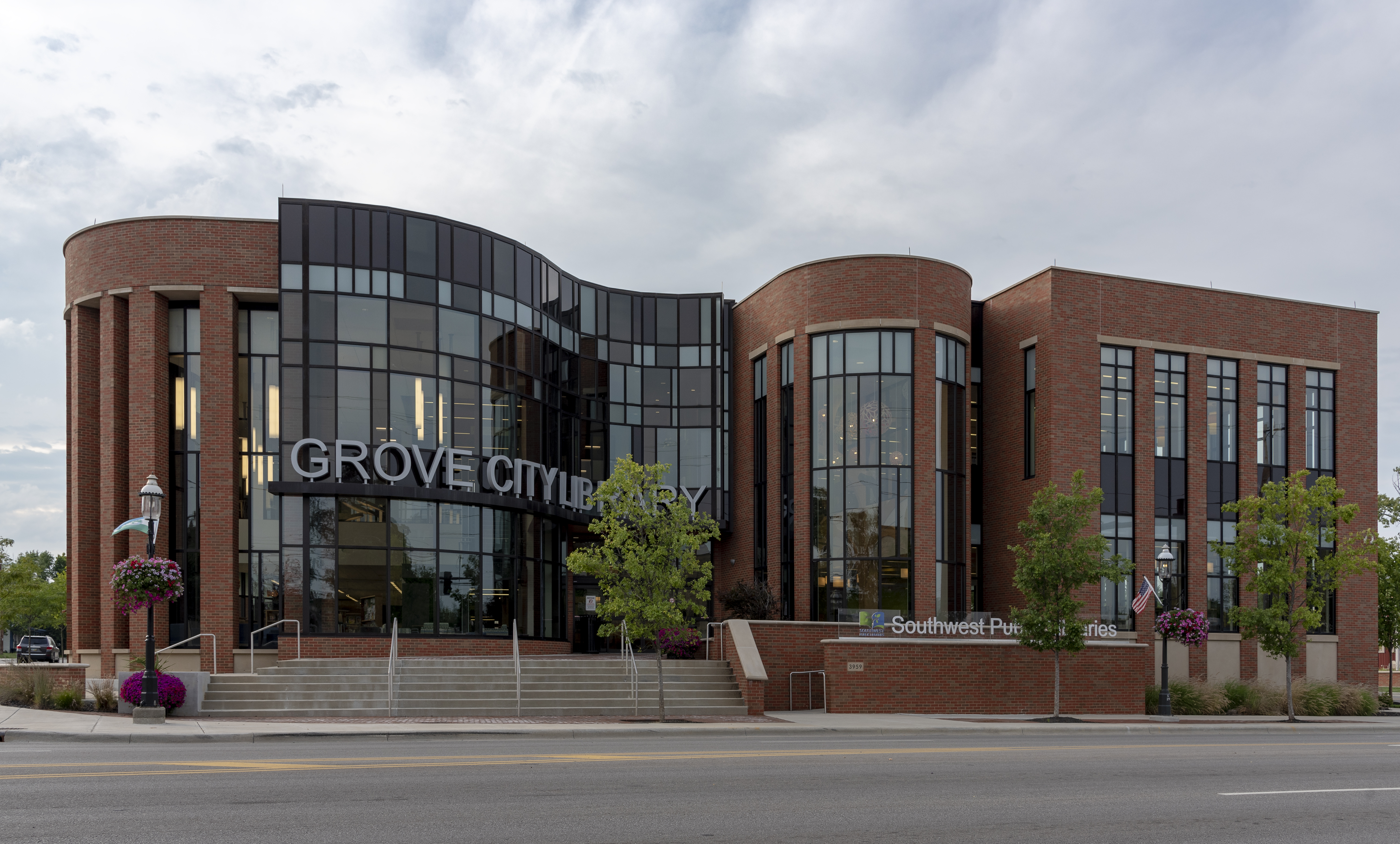
- Grove City Library

- Flag Seal
- Interactive map of Grove City, Ohio
- Location within Ohio Location within the United States
- Coordinates: 39°52′40″N 83°04′20″W
- Country: United States
- State: Ohio
- County: Franklin
- Founded: 1852
- Incorporated (village): March 5, 1866
- Incorporated (city): 1959
- Founder: William F. Breck

Government
  - Type: Mayor–council
  - Mayor: Richard L. “Ike” Stage

Area
  - Total: 19.120 sq mi (49.521 km^{2})
  - Land: 18.934 sq mi (49.040 km^{2})
  - Water: 0.185 sq mi (0.478 km^{2}) 0.97%
- Elevation: 807 ft (246 m)

Population (2020)
  - Total: 41,252
  - Estimate (2025): 45,180
  - Density: 2,178.7/sq mi (841.19/km^{2})
- Time zone: UTC−5 (Eastern (EST))
  - Summer (DST): UTC−4 (EDT)
- ZIP Code: 43123
- Area codes: 614 and 380
- FIPS code: 39-32592
- GNIS feature ID: 2394255
- Website: grovecityohio.gov

Grove City is a city in Franklin County, Ohio, United States. The population was 41,252 as of the 2020 census, and was estimated at 45,180 in 2025.

== History ==
The City of Grove City was founded in 1852. It was first incorporated as a village on March 5, 1866. Later, due to rapid growth, it was reincorporated and officially recognized as a city in 1959.

Until the mid-19th century, the area that is now Grove City was a wilderness filled with oak, beech, maple, walnut, dogwood and other trees. The area's first European settler, Hugh Grant, operated a gristmill in Pittsburgh and transported excess goods down the Ohio River for sale, returning to Pittsburgh on foot. On one of these trips, he passed through the Scioto Valley region and in 1803, purchased the land that would become Grove City and returned with his wife Catharine to start a new life.

Grove City's official founder, William F. Breck, bought 15.25 acres of the farm owned by Hugh Grant Jr., son of the first settler in Jackson Township, then added 300 more acres intended for farming. Breck's original plan changed when he realized the potential for growth since Harrisburg Turnpike passed through the area to the state capital, Columbus. Breck envisioned a new village complete with a school, church, stores, blacksmith and carpenter shops. Breck formed a commission with George Weygandt, William Sibray and Jeremiah Smith and platted the village on the east side of Broadway in 1852.

By December 1853, the newly formed (but not yet incorporated) village of Grove City had 50 residents. The town founders named the village for the remaining groves of trees left standing after their initial clearing.

== Geography ==
According to the United States Census Bureau, the city has a total area of 19.120 square miles (49.52 km^{2}), of which 18.935 square miles (49.04 km^{2}) is land and 0.185 square miles (0.48 km^{2}) (0.97%) is water.

Grove City is located in southeastern Franklin County. It is a suburb of Columbus.

== Demographics ==
Historical population
Census	Pop.	Note	%±
1870	143		—
1880	150		4.9%
1890	272		81.3%
1900	656		141.2%
1910	897		36.7%
1920	905		0.9%
1930	1,546		70.8%
1940	1,787		15.6%
1950	2,339		30.9%
1960	8,107		246.6%
1970	13,911		71.6%
1980	16,849		21.1%
1990	19,661		16.7%
2000	27,075		37.7%
2010	35,575		31.4%
2020	41,252		16.0%
2025 (est.)	45,180		9.5%
U.S. Decennial Census; 2020 Census

According to realtor website Zillow, the average price of a home as of May 31, 2026, in Grove City is $337,790.

As of the 2024 American Community Survey, there were 17,483 estimated households in Grove City with an average of 2.41 persons per household. The city has a median household income of $93,161. Approximately 6.4% of the city's opulation lives at or below the poverty line. Grove City has an estimated 67.2% employment rate, with 34.4% of the population holding a bachelor's degree or higher and 94.0% holding a high school diploma. There were 18,486 housing units at an average density of 976.29 per square mile (376.9/km^{2}).

The top five reported languages (people were allowed to report up to two languages, thus the figures will generally add to more than 100%) were English (94.8%), Spanish (2.4%), Indo-European (1.3%), Asian and Pacific Islander (1.1%), and Other (0.4%).

The median age in the city was 41.1 years.

Grove City, Ohio – racial and ethnic composition Note: the US Census treats Hispanic/Latino as an ethnic category. This table excludes Latinos from the racial categories and assigns them to a separate category. Hispanics/Latinos may be of any race.
Race / ethnicity (NH = non-Hispanic)	Pop. 1980	Pop. 1990	Pop. 2000	Pop. 2010	Pop. 2020
White alone (NH)	16,735 (99.32%)	19,333 (98.33%)	25,836 (95.42%)	32,438 (91.18%)	35,237 (85.42%)
Black or African American alone (NH)	40 (0.24%)	107 (0.54%)	405 (1.50%)	979 (2.75%)	1,505 (3.65%)
Native American or Alaska Native alone (NH)	4 (0.02%)	37 (0.19%)	52 (0.19%)	53 (0.15%)	44 (0.11%)
Asian alone (NH)	12 (0.07%)	74 (0.38%)	161 (0.59%)	454 (1.28%)	766 (1.86%)
Pacific Islander alone (NH)	—	—	2 (0.01%)	14 (0.04%)	3 (0.01%)
Other race alone (NH)	7 (0.04%)	3 (0.02%)	20 (0.07%)	44 (0.12%)	164 (0.40%)
Mixed race or multiracial (NH)	—	—	281 (1.04%)	681 (1.91%)	2,054 (4.98%)
Hispanic or Latino (any race)	51 (0.30%)	107 (0.54%)	318 (1.17%)	912 (2.56%)	1,479 (3.59%)
Total	16,849 (100.00%)	19,661 (100.00%)	27,075 (100.00%)	35,575 (100.00%)	41,252 (100.00%)

=== 2020 census ===
As of the 2020 census, there were 41,252 people, 16,430 households, and 11,123 families residing in the city. The population density was 2,359.28 inhabitants per square mile (910.9/km^{2}). There were 17,308 housing units at an average density of 989.88 per square mile (382.2/km^{2}). The racial makeup of the city was 86.27% White, 3.69% African American, 0.16% Native American, 1.88% Asian, 0.01% Pacific Islander, 1.67% from some other races and 6.32% from two or more races. Hispanic or Latino people of any race were 3.59% of the population.

The median age was 39.7 years. 23.3% of residents were under the age of 18 and 17.2% of residents were 65 years of age or older. For every 100 females there were 93.4 males, and for every 100 females age 18 and over there were 89.3 males.

99.8% of residents lived in urban areas, while 0.2% lived in rural areas.

There were 16,430 households in Grove City, of which 31.6% had children under the age of 18 living in them. Of all households, 51.6% were married-couple households, 15.0% were households with a male householder and no spouse or partner present, and 26.5% were households with a female householder and no spouse or partner present. About 26.4% of all households were made up of individuals and 12.5% had someone living alone who was 65 years of age or older.

There were 17,308 housing units, of which 5.1% were vacant. The homeowner vacancy rate was 0.6% and the rental vacancy rate was 8.5%.

=== 2010 census ===
As of the 2010 census, there were 35,575 people, 13,946 households, and 9,585 families residing in the city. The population density was 2,196.53 inhabitants per square mile (848.1/km^{2}). There were 14,720 housing units at an average density of 908.87 per square mile (350.9/km^{2}). The racial makeup of the city was 92.63% White, 2.80% African American, 0.18% Native American, 1.28% Asian, 0.05% Pacific Islander, 0.96% from some other races and 2.10% from two or more races. Hispanic or Latino people of any race were 2.56% of the population.

There were 13,946 households 35.3% had children under the age of 18 living with them, 52.2% were married couples living together, 11.8% had a female householder with no husband present, 4.7% had a male householder with no wife present, and 31.3% were non-families. 25.6% of households were one person and 9.7% were one person aged 65 or older. The average household size was 2.53 and the average family size was 3.04.

The median age was 37.8 years. 25.4% of residents were under the age of 18; 8.4% were between the ages of 18 and 24; 27.4% were from 25 to 44; 26.6% were from 45 to 64; and 12.2% were 65 or older. The gender makeup of the city was 48.3% male and 51.7% female.

=== 2000 census ===
As of the 2000 census, there were 27,075 people, 10,265 households, and 7,544 families residing in the city. The population density was 1,941.18 inhabitants per square mile (749.5/km^{2}). There were 10,712 housing units at an average density of 768.01 per square mile (296.5/km^{2}). The racial makeup of the city was 96.17% White, 1.54% African American, 0.22% Native American, 0.60% Asian, 0.01% Pacific Islander, 0.34% from some other races and 1.11% from two or more races. Hispanic or Latino people of any race were 1.17% of the population.

There were 10,265 households 37.8% had children under the age of 18 living with them, 59.5% were married couples living together, 10.3% had a female householder with no husband present, and 26.5% were non-families. 22.4% of households were one person and 8.3% were one person aged 65 or older. The average household size was 2.61 and the average family size was 3.07.

The age distribution was 28.3% under the age of 18, 7.4% from 18 to 24, 31.6% from 25 to 44, 21.7% from 45 to 64, and 11.1% 65 or older. The median age was 35 years. For every 100 females, there were 94.4 males. For every 100 females age 18 and over, there were 89.8 males.

The median household income was $52,064 and the median family income was $62,059. Males had a median income of $40,599 versus $30,399 for females. The per capita income for the city was $22,305. About 3.3% of families and 4.6% of the population were below the poverty line, including 5.3% of those under age 18 and 4.8% of those age 65 or over.

== Government ==
Grove City is operated based on a city charter that was originally written in 1958 and later amended in 1982. The charter gives the city's power to an elected Mayor, an elected City Council, and an appointed Administrator. The current mayor of Grove City is Richard L. (Ike) Stage.

Grove City is split between Ohio's 3rd and Ohio's 15th congressional district. The city is also split between Ohio's 3rd senatorial district and Ohio's 16th senatorial district and its Ohio State House Districts are OH-17, OH-23, and OH-24.

== Arts and culture ==
Grove City sponsors or hosts several events throughout the year, including its annual Wine & Arts Festival, Bourbon & Spirits Festival, and Christmas Tree Lighting and Parade.

The Grove City Chamber of Commerce hosts the Arts in the Alley Festival and Parade annually. A three-day festival, it will celebrate its 45th year in 2024.

=== National Register of Historic Places ===
- Gantz Homestead
- A.G. Grant Homestead

== Public safety ==
Grove City maintains its own Division of Police located at 3360 Park Street in Grove City. The department is nationally accredited by the Commission on Accreditation for Law Enforcement Agencies (CALEA). The current Chief of Police is Eric Scott.

Jackson Township provides fire protection for both Grove City and Jackson Township. The Jackson Township Fire Department maintains four fire stations (Stations 201, 202, 203, and 204). The department maintains a specialized hazmat unit. The current Department Chief is Randy Little.

== Education ==
=== Primary and secondary schools ===
Grove City is served by the South-Western City School District, which operates two high schools (Grove City High School) and Central Crossing High School), three middle schools (Beulah Park, Jackson, and Pleasant View), three intermediate schools (Hayes, Park Street, and Holt Crossing), eight elementary schools, and a career academy (South-Western Career Academy) within the city.

Area private schools include Grove City Christian, Our Lady of Perpetual Help School, and Beautiful Savior Lutheran School.

== Notable people ==
- Gary Burley, former professional football player for the Cincinnati Bengals
- Derek Combs, Mr. Football Ohio 1996; NFL player
- Richard Cordray, former Director of the Consumer Financial Protection Bureau
- Mike Mayers, Major League Baseball pitcher who debuted for the St. Louis Cardinals
- Craig McDonald, author, journalist
- Pat O'Conner, Minor League Baseball executive
- Ben Swanson, former professional soccer player for Columbus Crew

== Sister city ==
- Lübtheen, Germany

== Gallery ==
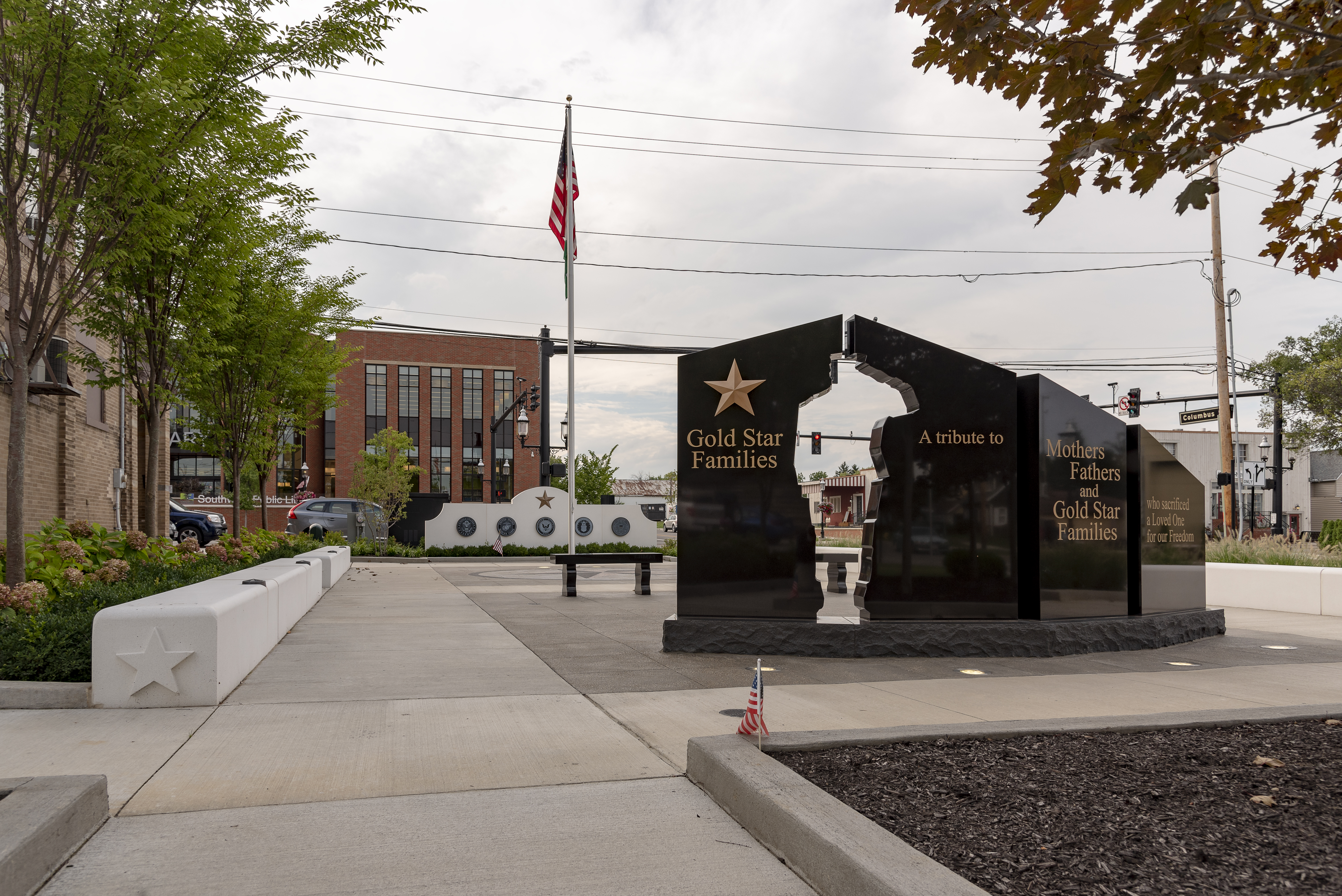
Gold Star Memorial Monument

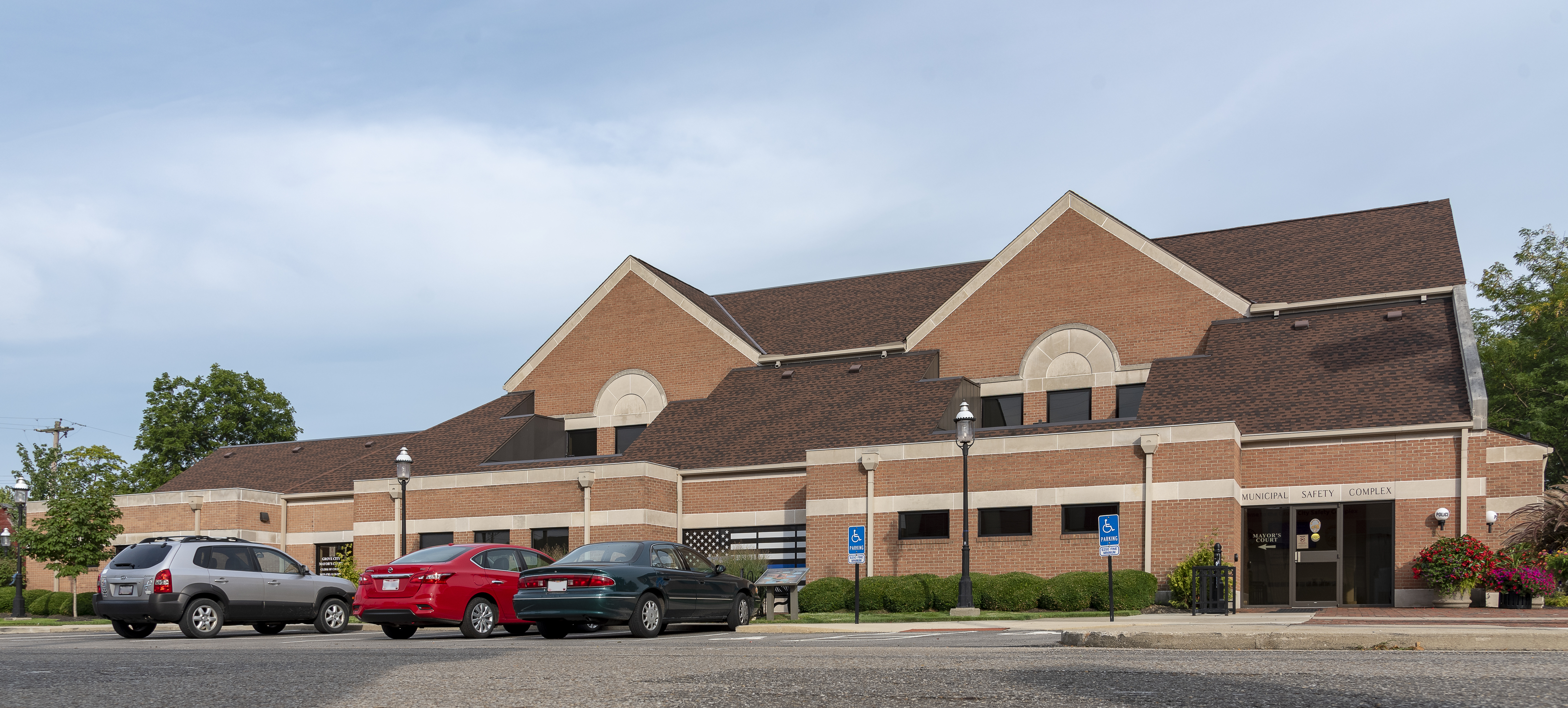
Grove City Municipal Safety Complex

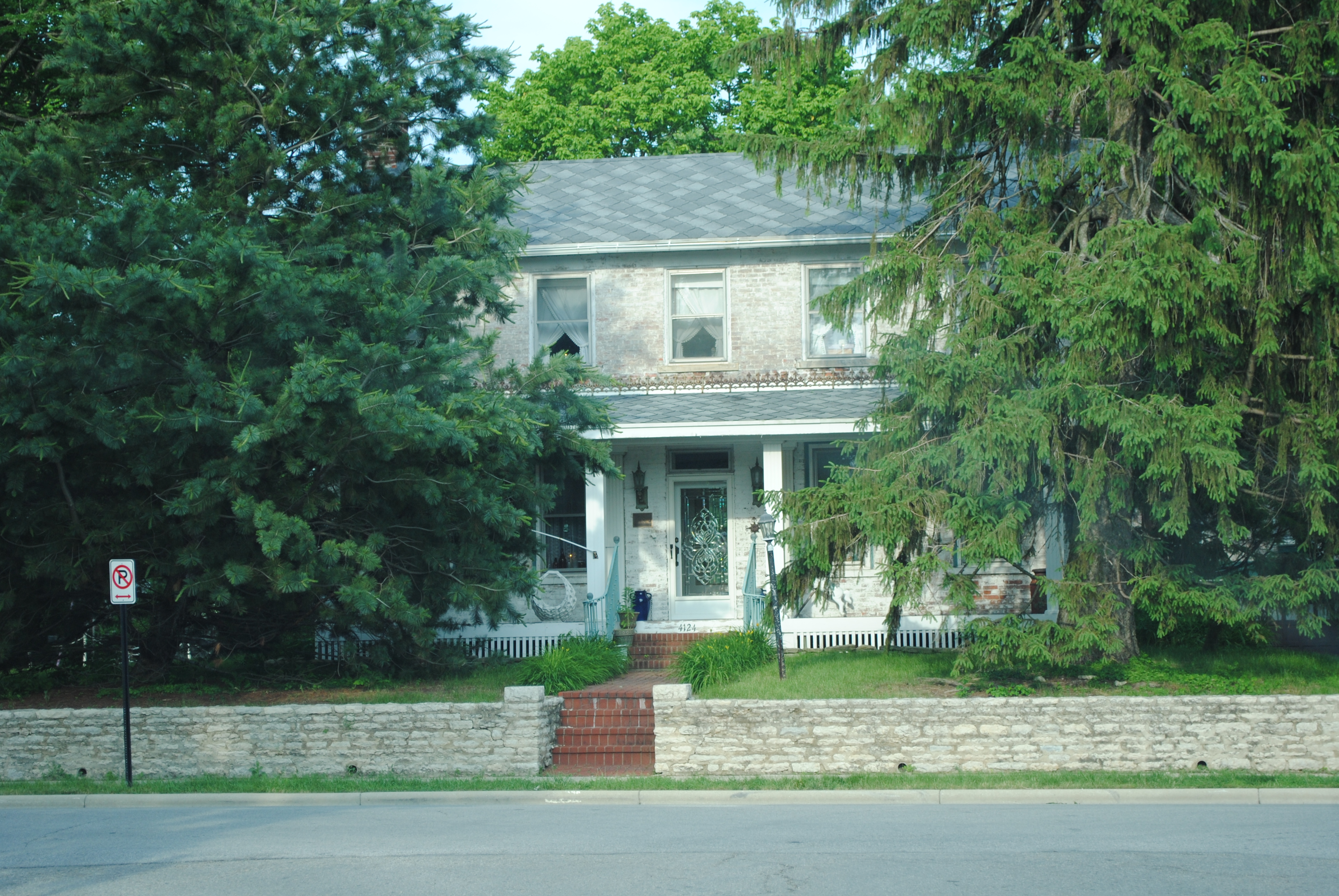
A.G. Grant Homestead

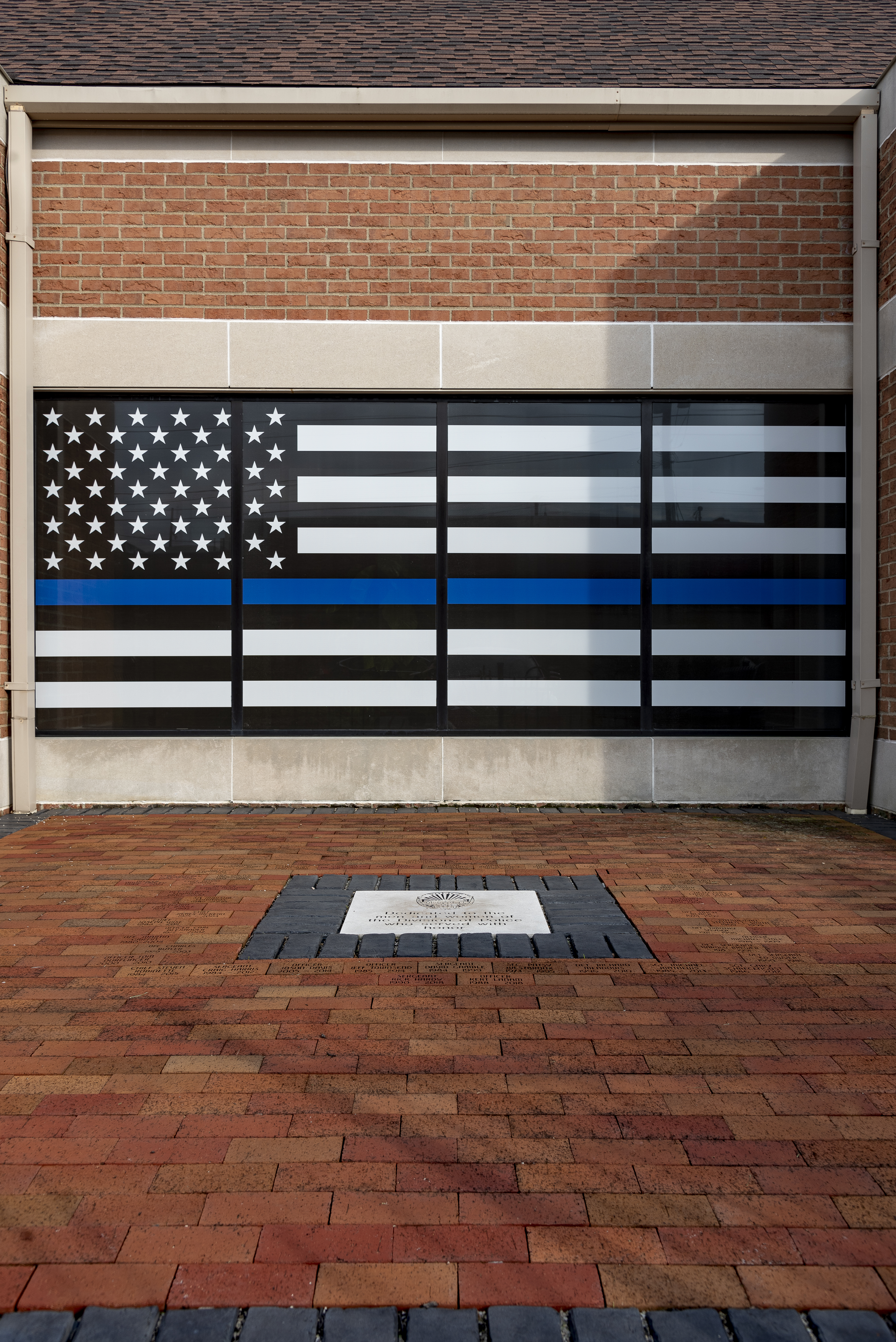
Grove City Police Memorial

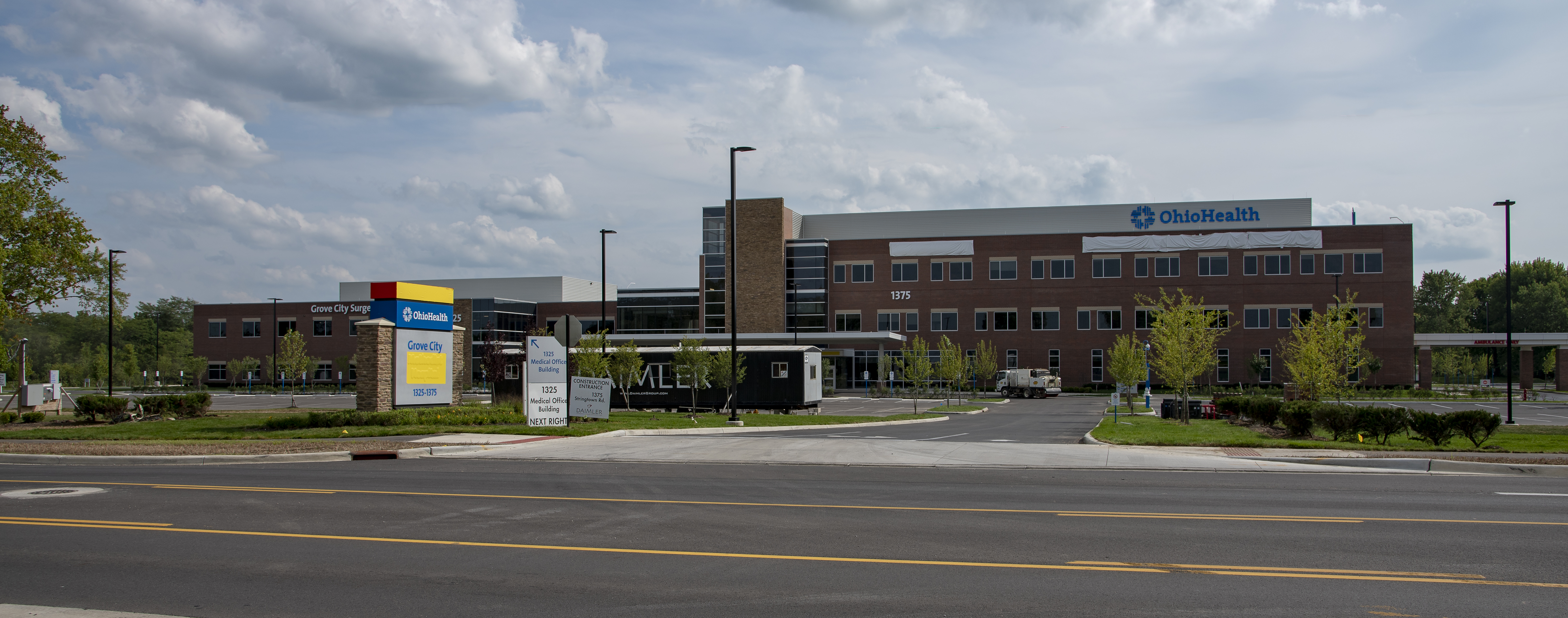
Grove City Medical Center Under Construction (2018)

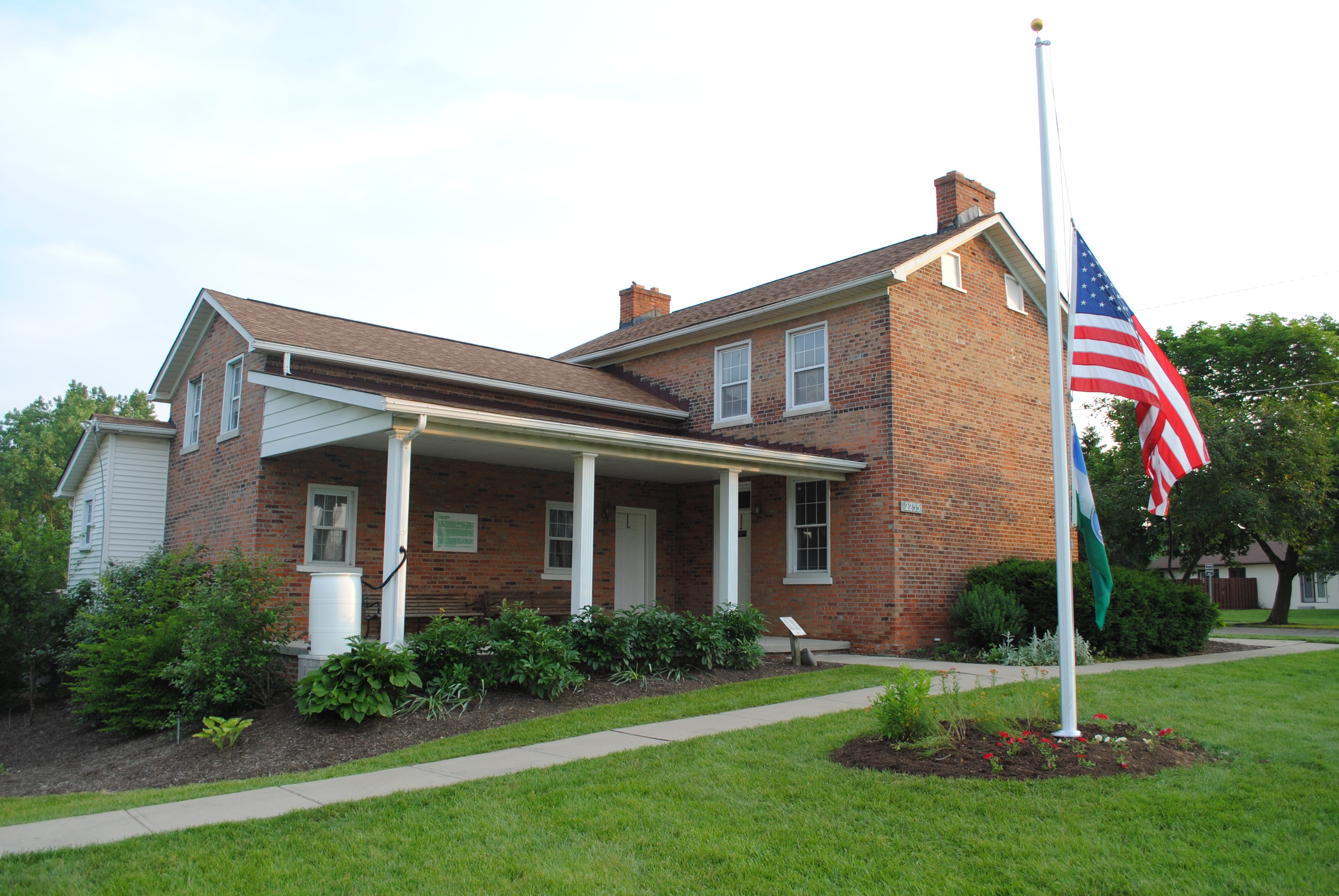
Gantz Homestead, built 1832

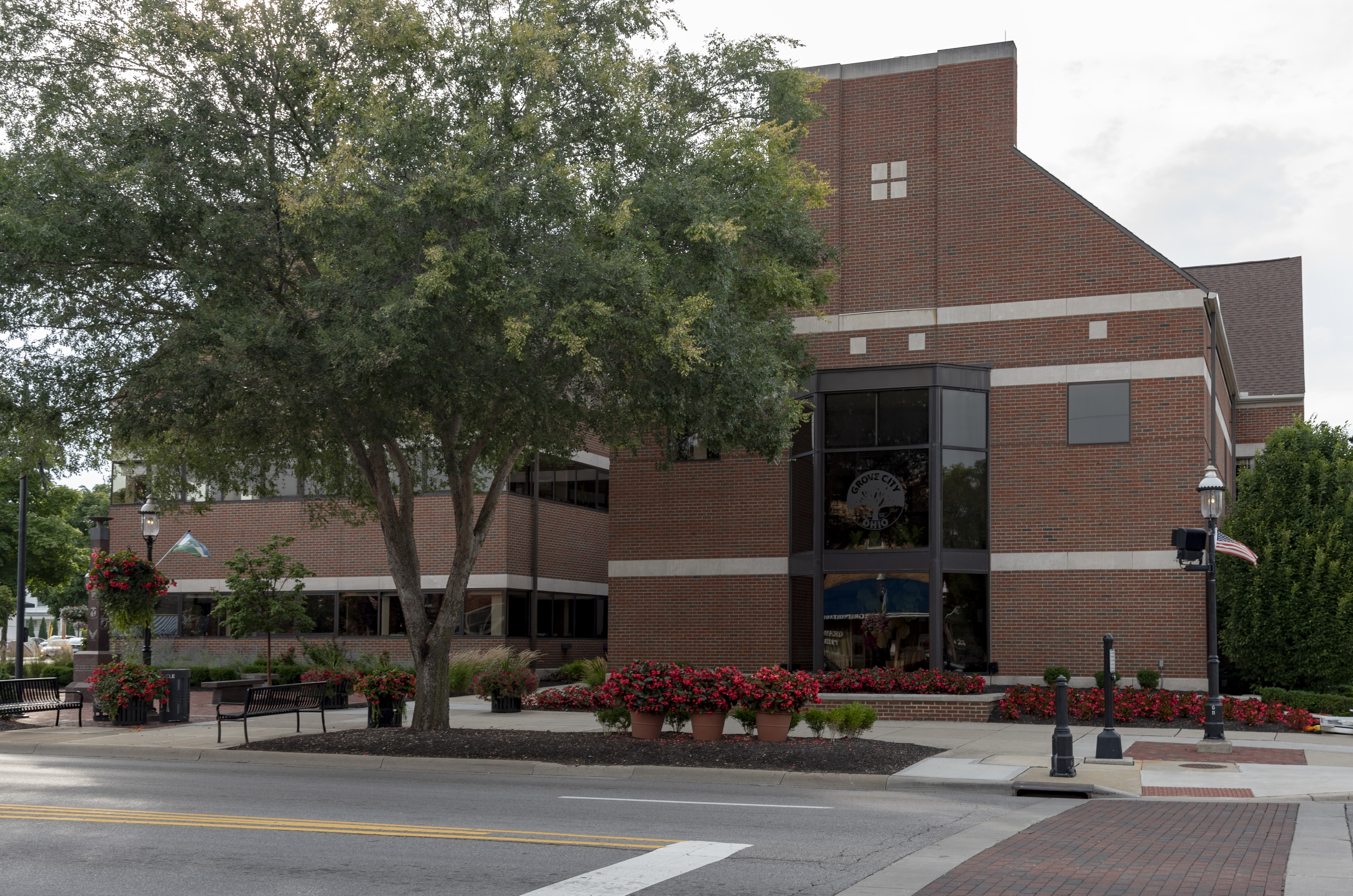
Grove City Government Offices

== See also ==
- Beulah Park Racetrack
- Scioto Grove Metro Park
