= Jackson Township, Franklin County, Ohio =

Township in Ohio, US

- Township
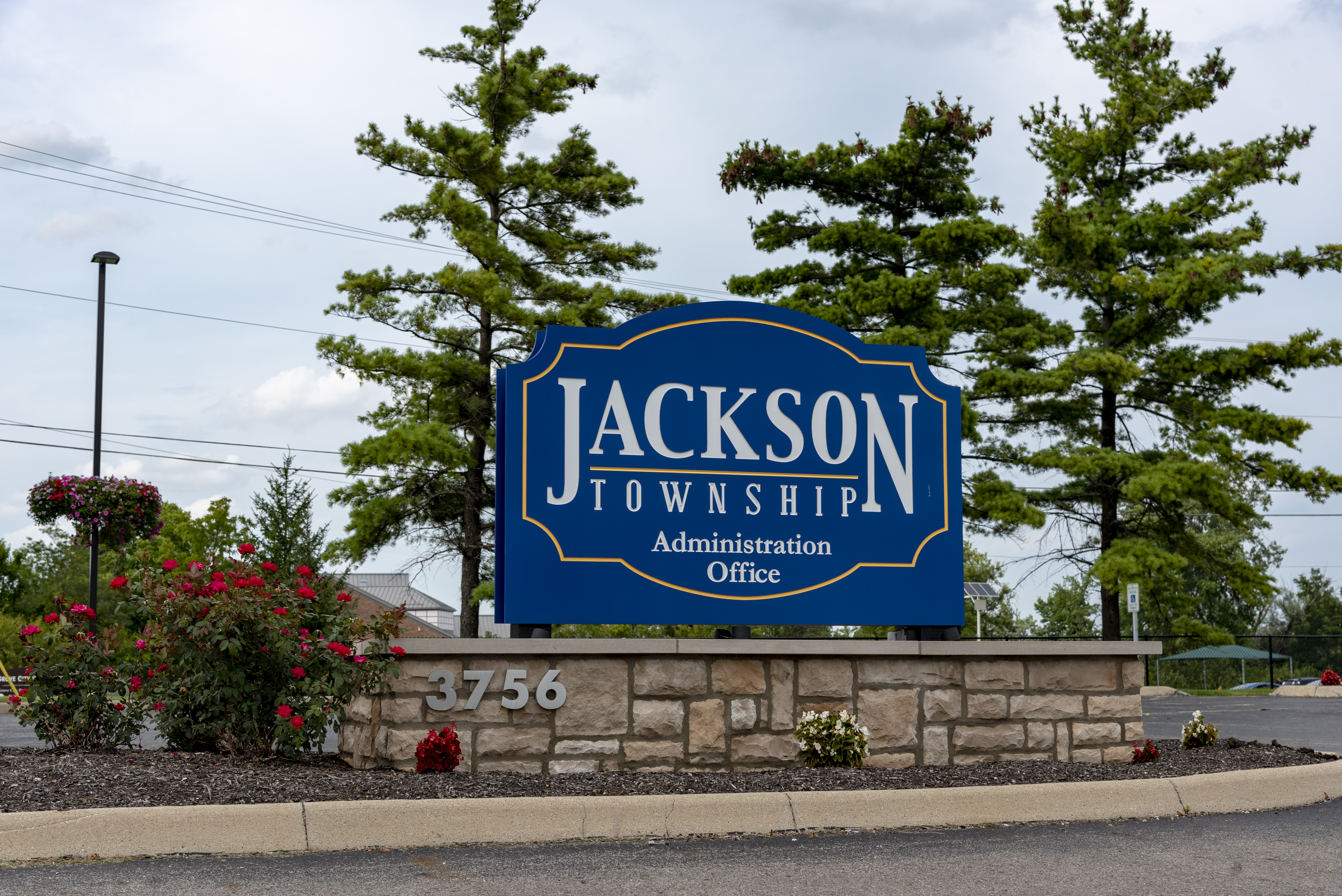
- Jackson Township administrative offices sign

- Location of Jackson Township in Franklin County.
- Coordinates: 39°52′43″N 83°4′25″W
- Country: United States
- State: Ohio
- County: Franklin

Area
  - Total: 35.7 sq mi (92 km^{2})
  - Land: 35.4 sq mi (92 km^{2})
  - Water: 0.4 sq mi (1.0 km^{2})
- Elevation: 820 ft (250 m)

Population (2020)
  - Total: 46,559
  - Density: 1,320/sq mi (508/km^{2})
- Time zone: UTC-5 (Eastern (EST))
  - Summer (DST): UTC-4 (EDT)
- FIPS code: 39-37772
- GNIS feature ID: 1086105
- Website: https://jacksontwpfranklinoh.gov/

Jackson Township is one of the seventeen townships of Franklin County, Ohio, United States. As of 2024, the population of Jackson is 74,386.

== Geography ==
Located in the southern part of the county, it borders the following townships and city

- Parts of Franklin Township – north
- Columbus – northeast
- Hamilton Township – southeast
- Scioto Township, Pickaway County – south
- Pleasant Township – west
- Prairie Township – northwest

Much of Jackson Township has been annexed into one of three municipalities:

- The city of Columbus, the county seat of Franklin County, in the northeast
- The city of Grove City, in the center
- The village of Urbancrest, in the northwest

== Name and history ==
It is one of thirty-seven Jackson Townships statewide.

== Government ==
The township is governed by a three-member board of trustees, who are elected in November of odd-numbered years to a four-year term beginning on the following January 1. Two are elected in the year after the presidential election and one is elected in the year before it. There is also an elected township fiscal officer, who serves a four-year term beginning on April 1 of the year after the election, which is held in November of the year before the presidential election. Vacancies in the fiscal officership or on the board of trustees are filled by the remaining trustees.

== Gallery ==
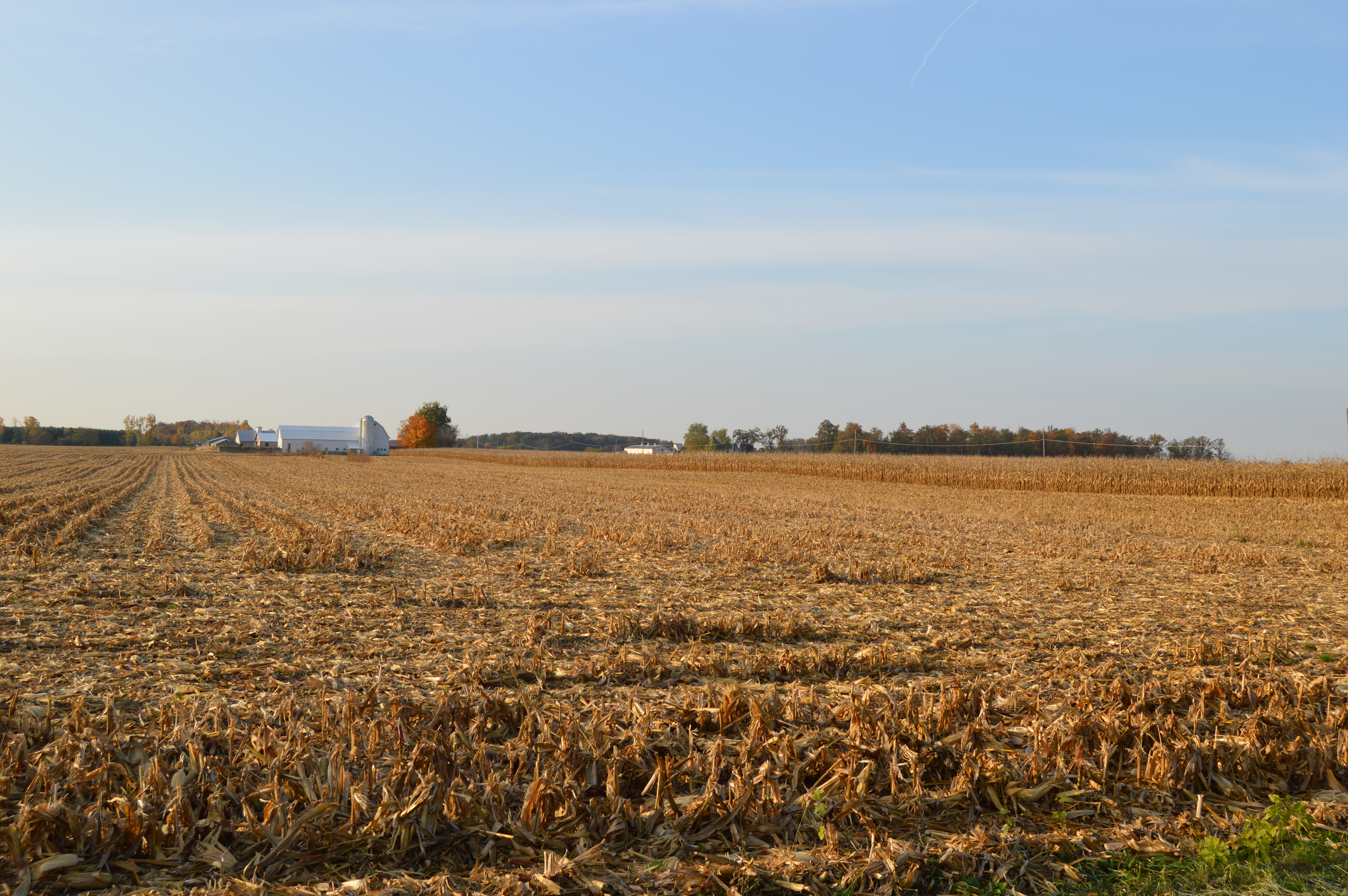
Fields on Zuber Road, south of Grove City

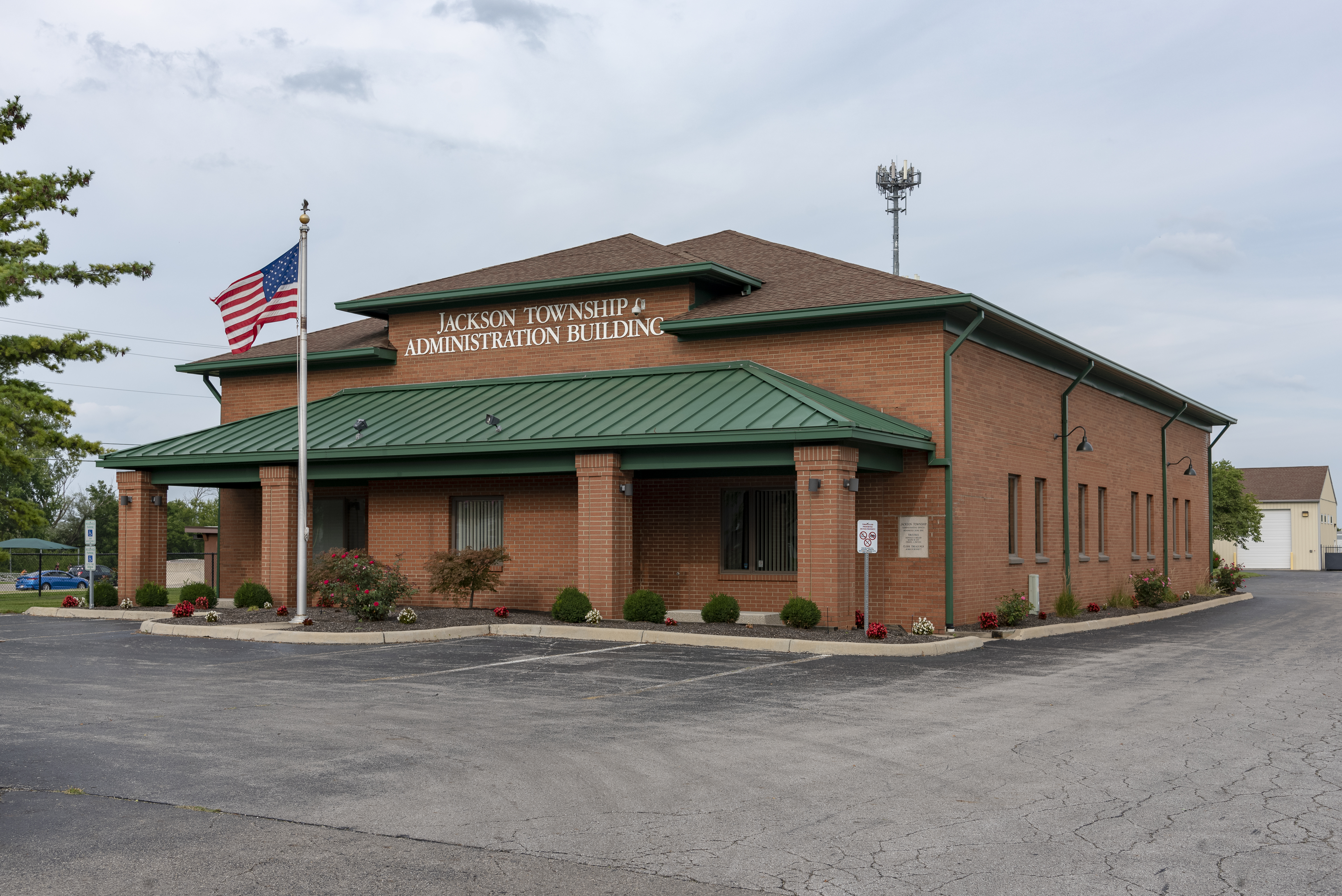
Jackson Township Administration Building

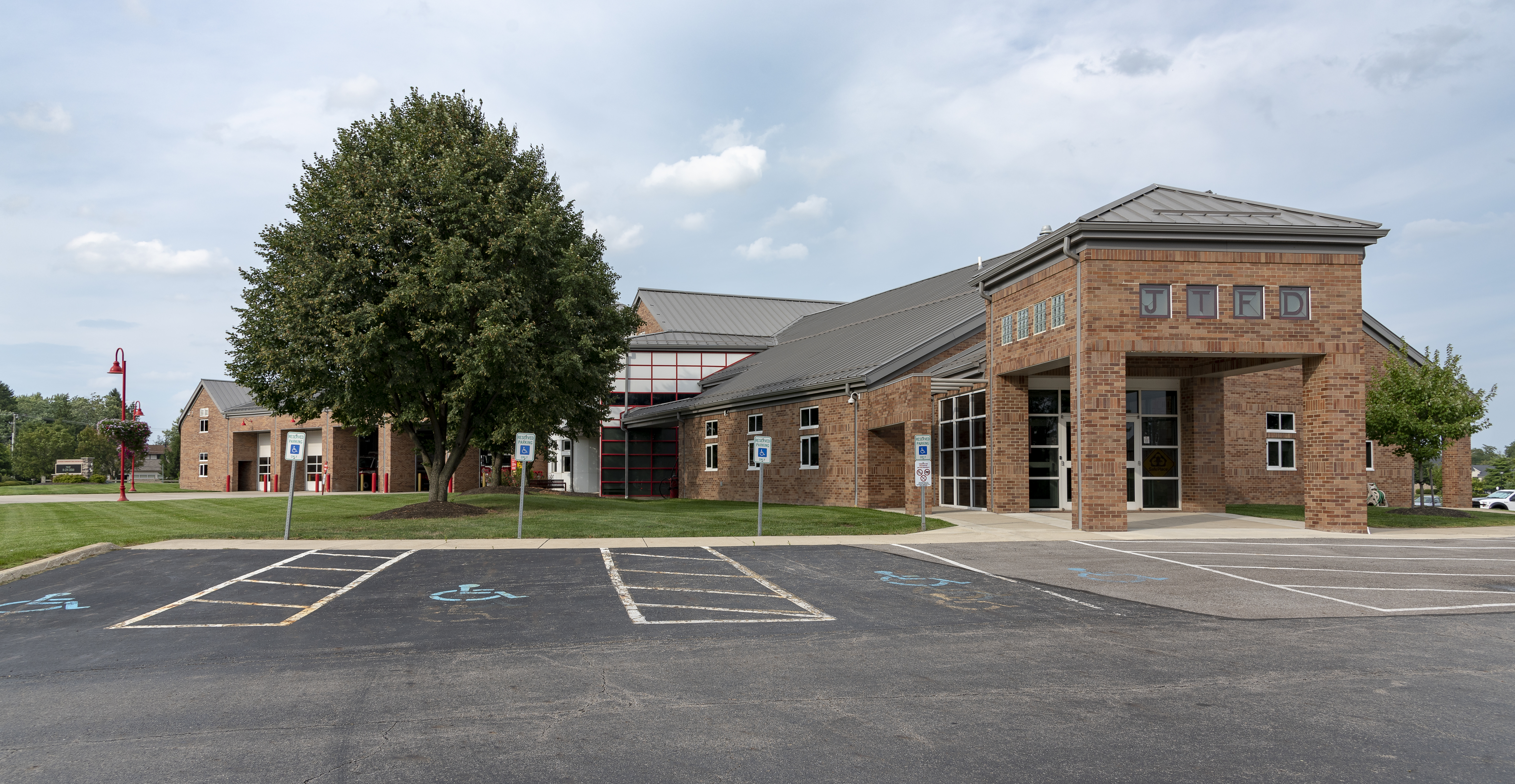
Jackson Township Fire Department Headquarters
