= Westland High School =

Location
- 146 Galloway Road; Galloway, (Franklin County), Ohio 43119; United States region:US-OH 39°56′53″N 83°8′59″W

Information
- Type: Public, Coeducational high school
- Motto: "#TOUGHSTREET"
- Established: 1970
- School district: South-Western City Schools
- Superintendent: Randy Banks
- Principal: Greg Costello
- Faculty: 146
- Teaching staff: 88.50 (FTE)
- Grades: 9-12
- Student to teacher ratio: 21.06
- Colors: Forest Green and White
- Athletics conference: Ohio Capital Conference
- Mascot: The Cougar
- Team name: Cougars
- Rival: Central Crossing High School
- Accreditation: North Central Association of Colleges and Schools
- Website: whs.swcsd.us/%20whs.swcsd.us

Westland High School is a public high school located in Galloway, Ohio. It is one of 4 high schools in the South-Western City Schools District. SWCS is located in the southwestern portion of Franklin County in Columbus, Ohio. Westland High School was opened in 1970.

== History ==
=== Founding ===
In 1970, Pleasant View Junior/Senior High School became a middle school when the newly built, Westland High School was constructed due to the need for more space to meet population growth in the Southwest Columbus region.

=== Current building ===
In the 2011–2012 school year, the building received minor renovations to lighting systems and a new ventilation system was put into place after an incident at the school.

There is a No-New-Mileage mileage bond which will possibly replace the school. It will be decided on Election Day in 2026.

The cafeteria has a mezzanine, known to students as "The Mez", where seniors sit during their lunch period.

The building is also nearly identical to Grove City High School, which moved to its current building in 1970.

=== School colors ===
The school colors, forest green and white, are picked from two middle schools, that feed into Westland. The school color of white is from Norton Middle School while forest green is from Pleasant View Middle.

== Sports ==
=== Rivalries ===
Westland High School has both inactive and active rivalries between intra-district and other city schools. The major rivalry is between Westland High School and Central Crossing High School, another SWCS school.

Westland has a current rivalry with intra-district Central Crossing High School, and the two schools played each other for the first time in 2008.

The school had a traditional rivalry with its sister school, Grove City High School. The two schools played each other annually from 1970 to 1973 and from 1981 to 1998. Westland is crosstown rivals with the former Hilliard High School, now Hilliard Davidson High School.

=== Football ===
The Westland Football program is currently coached by Trenton Williamson and plays in the Ohio Capital Conference's Central Division. The Cougars play their home games at Westland Field, which seats around 5,000 people.

Since its first football season in 1970, Westland has an all-time record of 131-257-2. Westland won OCC titles in 1970, 1992, and 1993. From 1990 to 1994 Head coach Tom Greer won 32 games and several players are earned all conference honors. Westland lost its football program during the 2009 season with the August failure of the Southwestern City School District levy. Football returned to Westland in 2010.

== Clubs ==
Cultural Diversity Club, Math Club, Spanish Club, Key Club, Art Club, Drama Club, International Thespian Society, Student Council, Student Government, Chess Club, Jobs for Grads, Student Advisory Board, National Honor Society, French Club, Marching Band, Choir, Concert Band Symphonic Band, Air Force JROTC(OH-011), Jazz Band, Orchestra, Gay-Straight Alliance, Crossroads, Renaissance, Anime Club, Westland Esports
