= Urbancrest, Ohio =

- Village
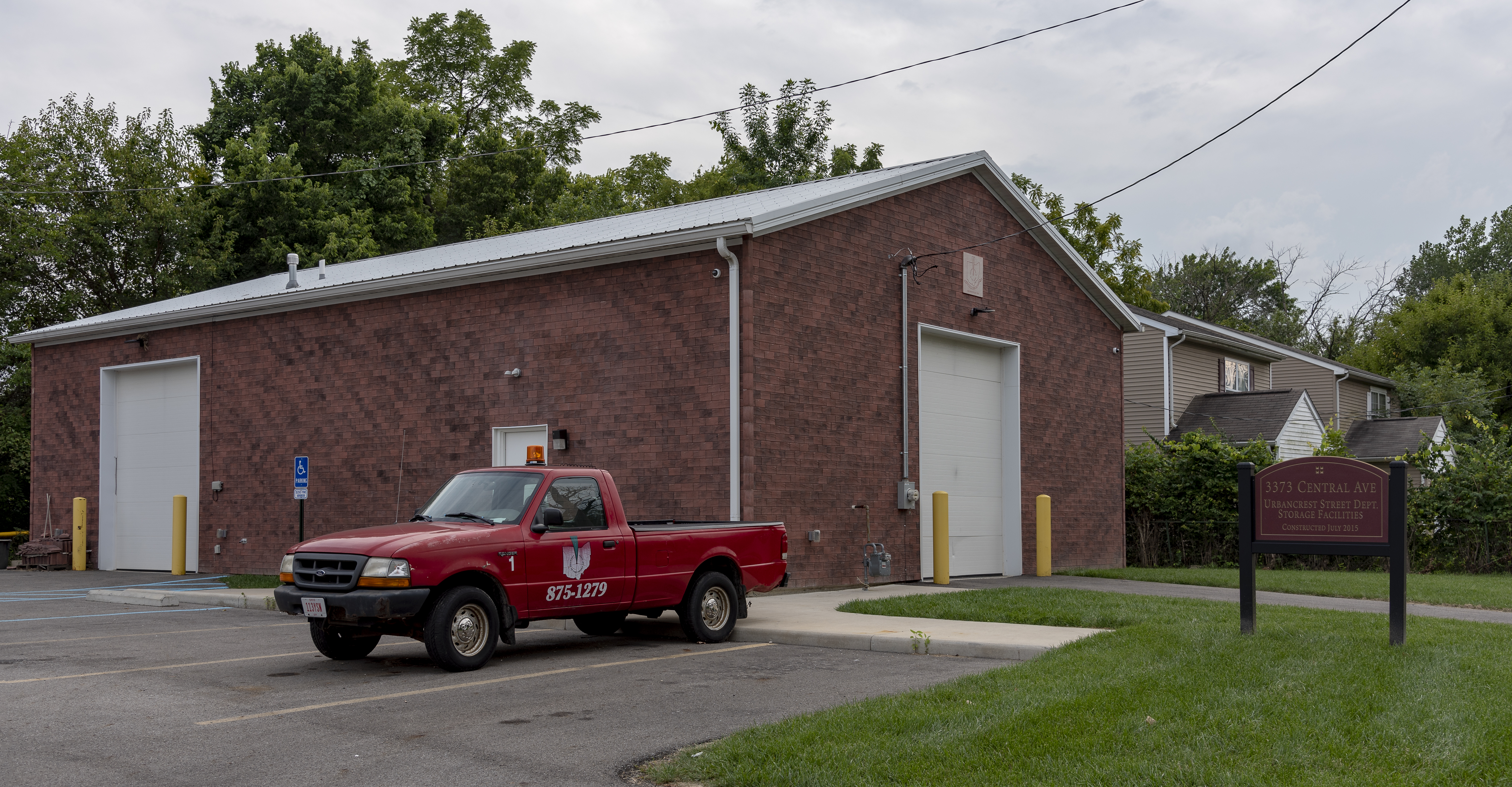
- Urbancrest Maintenance Facilities

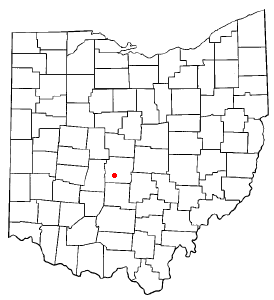
- Location of Urbancrest, Ohio

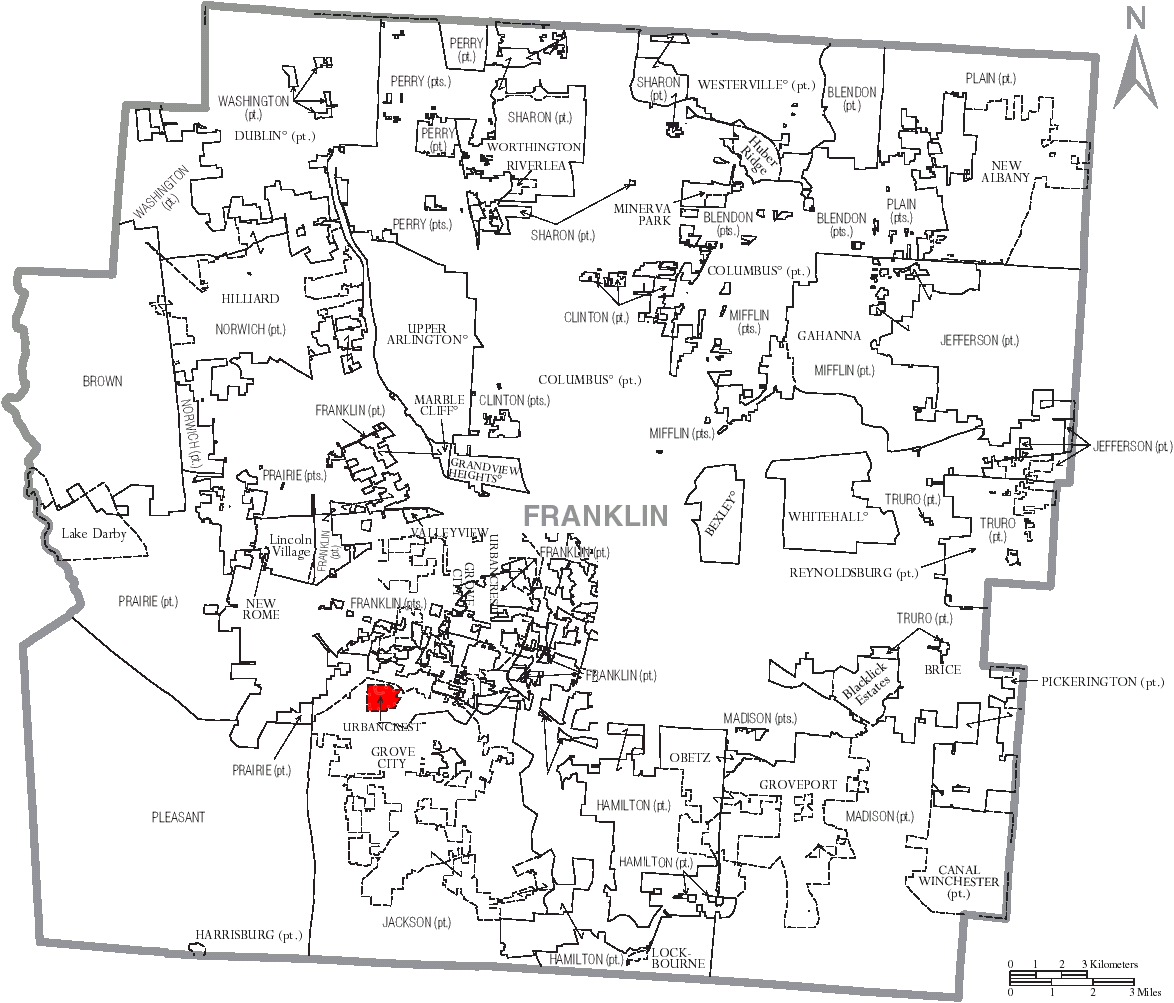
- Location of Urbancrest within Franklin County
- Coordinates: 39°54′06″N 83°05′10″W
- Country: United States
- State: Ohio
- County: Franklin

Area
  - Total: 0.59 sq mi (1.52 km^{2})
  - Land: 0.59 sq mi (1.52 km^{2})
  - Water: 0 sq mi (0.00 km^{2})
- Elevation: 830 ft (250 m)

Population (2020)
  - Total: 1,031
  - Density: 1,759.7/sq mi (679.44/km^{2})
- Time zone: UTC-5 (Eastern (EST))
  - Summer (DST): UTC-4 (EDT)
- ZIP code: 43123
- Area code: 614
- FIPS code: 39-79100
- GNIS feature ID: 2400032
- Website: www.villageofurbancrestoh.us

Urbancrest is a village in Franklin County, Ohio, United States. The population was 1,031 at the 2020 census. Urbancrest is in the South-Western City Schools District.

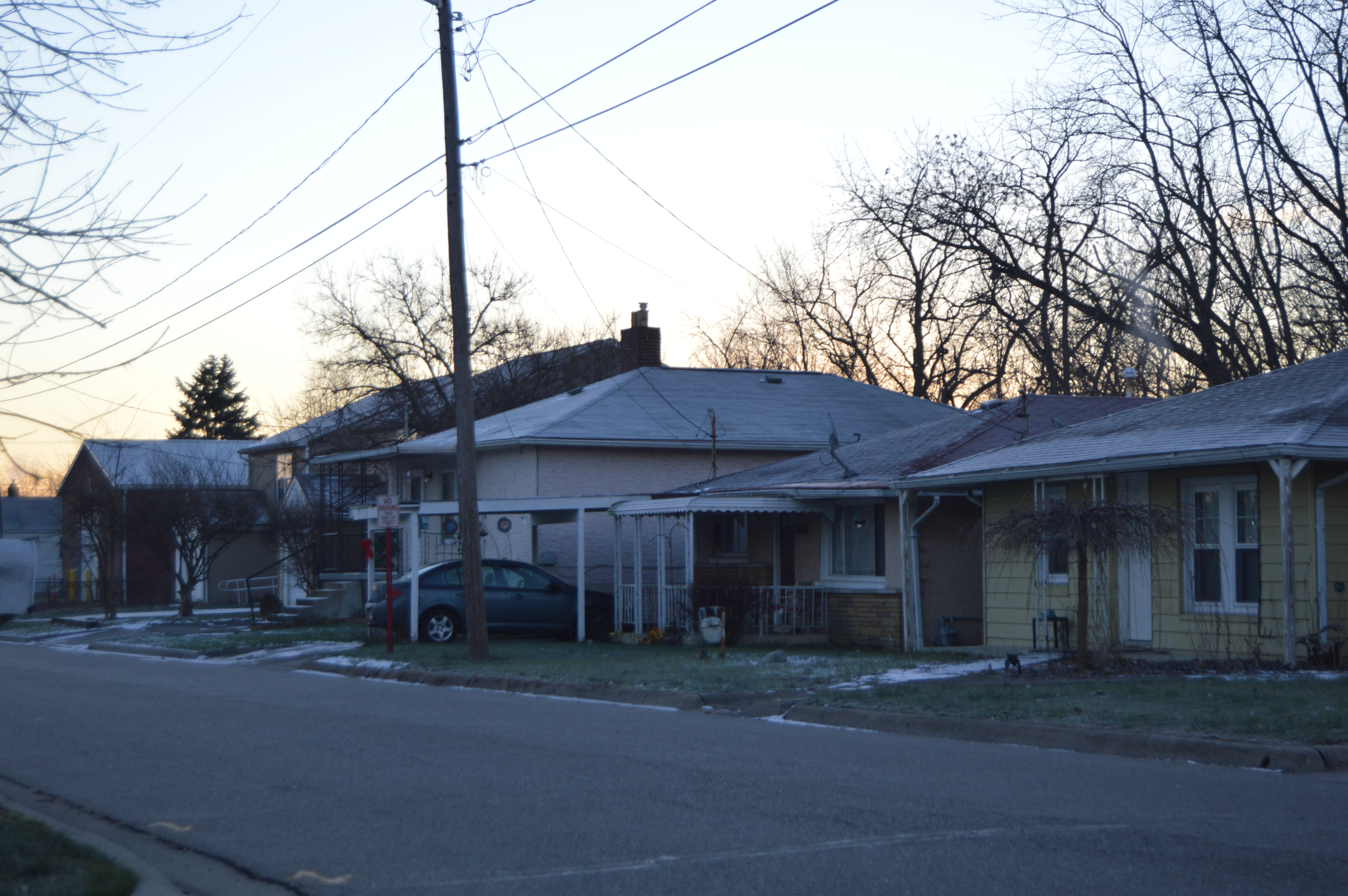
Houses on Central Avenue

== Geography ==
According to the United States Census Bureau, the village has a total area of 0.60 square miles (1.55 km^{2}), all land.

Urbancrest borders Columbus, Ohio and Grove City, Ohio.

It is entirely located in the South-Western City School District.

== History ==
Urbancrest was first settled in 1889, with the first church, later known as Union Baptist Church, being founded in 1892. The village was then incorporated in 1948. In 1971, Urbancrest elected Ellen Walker Craig-Jones as mayor, making her the first African-American female mayor elected in the United States of America.

== Demographics ==
Historical population
Census	Pop.	Note	%±
1950	823		—
1960	1,029		25.0%
1970	754		−26.7%
1980	880		16.7%
1990	862		−2.0%
2000	868		0.7%
2010	960		10.6%
2020	1,031		7.4%
U.S. Decennial Census 2020

=== 2020 census ===
Urbancrest village, Ohio – Racial and ethnic composition Note: the US Census treats Hispanic/Latino as an ethnic category. This table excludes Latinos from the racial categories and assigns them to a separate category. Hispanics/Latinos may be of any race.
Race / Ethnicity (NH = Non-Hispanic)	Pop 2000	Pop 2010	Pop 2020	% 2000	% 2010	2020
White alone (NH)	194	231	255	22.35%	24.06%	24.73%
Black or African American alone (NH)	503	523	599	57.95%	54.48%	58.10%
Native American or Alaska Native alone (NH)	4	1	0	0.46%	0.10%	0.00%
Asian alone (NH)	122	28	18	14.06%	2.92%	1.75%
Native Hawaiian or Pacific Islander alone (NH)	0	84	2	0.00%	8.75%	0.19%
Other race alone (NH)	3	6	8	0.35%	0.31%	0.78%
Mixed race or Multiracial (NH)	30	54	60	3.46%	5.63%	5.82%
Hispanic or Latino (any race)	12	36	89	1.38%	3.75%	8.63%
Total	868	960	1,031	100.00%	100.00%	100.00%

=== 2010 census ===
As of the census of 2010, there were 960 people, 337 households, and 237 families living in the village. The population density was 1,600.0 inhabitants per square mile (617.8/km^{2}). There were 367 housing units at an average density of 611.7 per square mile (236.2/km^{2}). The racial makeup of the village was 26.4% White, 55.1% African American, 0.1% Native American, 2.9% Asian, 8.8% Pacific Islander, 0.9% from other races, and 5.8% from two or more races. Hispanic or Latino of any race were 3.8% of the population.

There were 337 households, of which 46.6% had children under the age of 18 living with them, 29.4% were married couples living together, 33.2% had a female householder with no husband present, 7.7% had a male householder with no wife present, and 29.7% were non-families. 25.8% of all households were made up of individuals, and 9.5% had someone living alone who was 65 years of age or older. The average household size was 2.85 and the average family size was 3.41.

The median age in the village was 25.3 years. 38.1% of residents were under the age of 18; 11.3% were between the ages of 18 and 24; 23.6% were from 25 to 44; 19.7% were from 45 to 64; and 7.4% were 65 years of age or older. The gender makeup of the village was 45.0% male and 55.0% female.

=== 2000 census ===
As of the census of 2000, there were 868 people, 321 households, and 234 families living in the village. The population density was 1,962.0 inhabitants per square mile (757.5/km^{2}). There were 347 housing units at an average density of 784.4 per square mile (302.9/km^{2}). The racial makeup of the village was 23.50% White, 57.95% African American, 0.46% Native American, 14.06% Asian, 0.58% from other races, and 3.46% from two or more races. Hispanic or Latino of any race were 1.38% of the population.

There were 321 households, out of which 47.4% had children under the age of 18 living with them, 24.6% were married couples living together, 42.4% had a female householder with no husband present, and 26.8% were non-families. 24.3% of all households were made up of individuals, and 10.3% had someone living alone who was 65 years of age or older. The average household size was 2.70 and the average family size was 3.20.

In the village, the population was spread out, with 41.8% under the age of 18, 9.0% from 18 to 24, 22.4% from 25 to 44, 16.9% from 45 to 64, and 9.9% who were 65 years of age or older. The median age was 24 years. For every 100 females there were 72.6 males. For every 100 females age 18 and over, there were 62.4 males.

The median income for a household in the village was $20,333, and the median income for a family was $23,929. Males had a median income of $27,500 versus $25,268 for females. The per capita income for the village was $10,003. About 30.6% of families and 32.7% of the population were below the poverty line, including 44.7% of those under age 18 and 15.6% of those age 65 or over.
