= Franklin Heights High School =

Location
- 1001 Demorest Road; Columbus, (Franklin County), Ohio 43204; United States
- Coordinates: 39°55′56″N 83°5′29″W

Information
- Type: Public high school
- Established: 1955
- Superintendent: Bill Wise
- Principal: Timothy Donahue
- Staff: 34
- Faculty: 76
- Teaching staff: 67.90 (FTE)
- Grades: 9-12
- Student to teacher ratio: 20.28
- Campus: Urban
- Colors: Black and Gold
- Athletics conference: Central Buckeye League
- Team name: Falcons
- Accreditation: North Central Association of Colleges and Schools
- Website: School Website

Franklin Heights High School is a public high school in Columbus, Ohio. It is 1 of 5 high schools in the South-Western City Schools district. The building was renovated and reopened for students in 2016. The schools mascot is the Golden Falcon. FHHS has many women and boys athletic teams such as the dance team, soccer teams, and highly competitive track team. Extracurriculars include a highly awarded marching band, drama club, and the 4th oldest NJROTC unit in the nation.

== Athletics ==
- Track & Field (Indoor & Outdoor)
- Dance
- Girls Soccer
- Boys Soccer
- Boys Tennis
- Volleyball
- Baseball
- Marching Band
- Football
- Gymnastics
- Wrestling
