= Darbydale, Ohio =

- Census-designated place
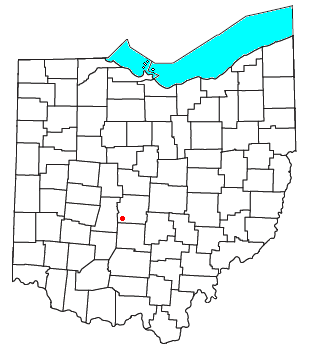
- Location of Darbydale, Ohio
- Coordinates: 39°51′16″N 83°10′46″W
- Country: United States
- State: Ohio
- County: Franklin
- Township: Pleasant

Area
  - Total: 1.02 sq mi (2.63 km^{2})
  - Land: 1.00 sq mi (2.58 km^{2})
  - Water: 0.019 sq mi (0.05 km^{2})
- Elevation: 873 ft (266 m)

Population (2020)
  - Total: 768
  - Density: 771.2/sq mi (297.75/km^{2})
- Time zone: UTC-5 (Eastern (EST))
  - Summer (DST): UTC-4 (EDT)
- ZIP code: 43123
- FIPS code: 39-20198
- GNIS feature ID: 2628882

Darbydale is an unincorporated community and census-designated place (CDP) in central Pleasant Township, Franklin County, Ohio, United States. It was an incorporated village until its disincorporation on December 27, 1985. As of the 2020 census, the population was 768.

The community is located in the southwest part of Franklin County, on the north side of Big Darby Creek, a tributary of the Scioto River. It is 14 miles (23 km) southwest of downtown Columbus.

== Demographics ==
Historical population
Census	Pop.	Note	%±
2010	793		—
2020	768		−3.2%
U.S. Decennial Census
