= Grove City High School =

Public school in Ohio, United States

Location
- 4665 Hoover Road; Grove City, (Franklin County), Ohio 43123; United States
- 39.8695°N 83.07229°W

Information
- Type: Public, Coeducational high school
- Established: 1970
- School district: South-Western City Schools
- Authority: 107 teachers, 38 classified staff members, and four administrators
- Superintendent: Randy Banks
- Principal: Tara Thompson
- Teaching staff: 88.96 (FTE)
- Grades: 9-12
- Student to teacher ratio: 20.83
- Colors: Crimson & Blue
- Athletics conference: Ohio Capital Conference
- Team name: Greyhound
- Accreditation: North Central Association of Colleges and Schools
- Newspaper: Newshound
- Website: School Website

Grove City High School is a high school in Grove City, Ohio, United States. It is one of the five high schools in the South-Western City Schools district. It houses about 1,900 students in grades 9-12. Formerly Jackson High School, Grove City High School moved from the former Park Street building in 1970, where it had been located since 1929. Grove City High School was chartered in the fall of 1895. The average classroom experience of GCHS teachers is 15.89 years. 46 teachers have bachelor's degrees and 63 have master's degrees or beyond. Special training has included TESA, Continuous Quality Improvement (CQI) training, site-based leadership training, integrated learning, alternative assessment, and alternative classroom management. Grove City High School has been A School Of Excellence for five years now.

== Instrumental Music Program ==
The Grove City High School instrumental music program has over 300 wind, percussion, and string musicians who participate in various performing groups. These groups include the Marching Band, Symphonic Band, Concert Bands, Jazz Bands, Concert Orchestra, Symphony Orchestra, and Percussion Ensemble. There is also a Color Guard that is part of the Marching Band as well as participates in Winter Guard competitions.

The Grove City High School Marching Band has received over 30 Grand Champion awards over the last ten years in OMEA competitions. The band received superior ratings at the OMEA State Marching Band Contest every year since the contest's inception in 1980 until the fall of 2009 when repeated school levy failures resulted in the cancellation of all extracurricular activities, including marching band.

Highlights:

- The Pasadena Tournament of Roses Parade - 1990, 2000 & 2017
- Chicago St. Patricks Day Parade - 2022
- Orlando Music Fest National Band Championship - 1993 & 1997
- London New Year's Day Parade - 2005
- Phoenix Fiesta Bowl Parade and National Band Championship - 2008 & 2012
- In 2002, the band took 5th place in the finals of Bands Of America Regional Competition in Louisville, Kentucky as well as winning Outstanding Musical Performance.
- In 2003 the band was invited to the 42nd Annual Contest Of Champions in Murfreesboro, Tennessee and placed 5th in finals.
- Symphonic & Concert Bands - The Symphonic Band has consistently received superior ratings in Class AA at both district and state OMEA adjudicated events for over thirty years (since 1975), as has Concert Band I in Class B, and more recently Class A, for over twenty years (since 1984). Concert Band II performs in the Class C level, and earned straight superior ratings at both district and state adjudicated events in 2005.

Highlights for the Symphonic Band:

Performed at the 50th Anniversary of the Mid-West International Band and Orchestra Clinic in Chicago, Illinois on December 19, 1996. Invited to perform at the MidwestClinic again in 2002. Performed at the 1993, 2001, and 2024 OMEA State Convention and was the clinician band for the composer Francis McBeth at the 1995 OMEA State Convention, as well as for Mark Kelly in 1989. Guest band for the Directors' Clinic at Miami University with Donald Hunsburger of the Eastman School of Music and H. Robert Reynolds from the University of Michigan.

== Extracurricular activities ==
- Boys Sports (Soccer, Golf, Cross Country, Football, Basketball, Wrestling, Swimming, Baseball, Track and Tennis)
- Girls Sports (Softball, Golf, Track, Basketball, Swimming, Gymnastics, Basketball and Football Cheerleading, Volleyball, Soccer, Tennis, and Cross Country)
- Instrumental Music programs (Marching Band, Concert Band, Symphonic Band, Jazz Band, Concert Orchestra, Symphonic Orchestra, Flag Corps)
- Vocal Music Programs (Concert Choir, Symphonic Choir, Chorale, Show Choir [Touch of Class (Co-ed) and Class Act (Unisex)], Men/Women's Chorus)

=== Ohio High School Athletic Association State Championships ===
- Girls Softball - 1983

== Notable alumni ==
- Gary Burley – Cincinnati Bengals player
- Derek Combs – NFL running back
- Richard Cordray – American politician
- Ann Grossman – Professional tennis player
- Alex Grinch – UCF Football Defensive Coordinator
- Craig McDonald – Author, journalist
- Mike Mayers – MLB pitcher for the Chicago White Sox
- Ben Swanson – Professional soccer player
