= Galloway, Ohio =

- Unincorporated community
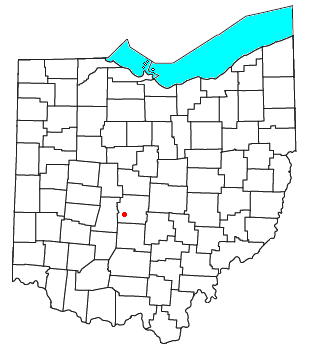
- Location of Galloway, Ohio
- Coordinates: 39°54′47″N 83°09′45″W
- Country: United States
- State: Ohio
- County: Franklin
- Township: Prairie
- Elevation: 899 ft (274 m)
- Time zone: UTC-5 (Eastern (EST))
  - Summer (DST): UTC-4 (EDT)
- ZIP codes: 43119
- GNIS feature ID: 1064700

Galloway is an unincorporated community west of the city of Columbus in southern Prairie Township, Franklin County, Ohio, United States. The 43119 ZIP Code, however (which carries a Galloway mailing address) covers a significant portion of rural and suburban western Franklin County, as well as parts of western Columbus, and locals might use the name Galloway to refer to any location in the area roughly bounded by I-70, Galloway Rd, Alkire Rd, and Big Darby Creek; such a location is seldom in the community of Galloway proper. The Galloway Post Office is located within the city of Columbus about two miles north of the actual community of Galloway, which lies at the intersection of Galloway Road and Sullivant Avenue.

== Geography ==
Galloway is located where Galloway Rd crosses the Camp Chase Railway.

== History ==
The former town is named after Samuel Galloway, a Columbus luminary and staunch abolitionist during the Civil War.

== Schools and other public services ==
Most of the area covered by 43119 Zip Code, including Galloway proper, is part of Southwestern City School District. Portions on the eastern fringes are served by Columbus City Schools. The northern edge of the area is part of Hilliard City School District, while the rural western boundary is served by Jefferson Local Schools.

== Notable person ==
- John W. Galbreath, sportsman and horse breeder
