= San Filippo Neri =

San Filippo Neri may refer to:

- San Filippo Neri, an Italian priest, known as the Second Apostle of Rome, after Saint Peter
- San Filippo Neri, a quarter on the northern outskirts of Palermo, Sicily

== Architecture ==
- San Filippo Neri, Camerino, a Baroque style Roman Catholic church in Camerino, in the province of Macerata, region of Marche, Italy
- San Filippo Neri, Casale Monferrato, a Baroque-style, Roman Catholic church in Casale Monferrato, Province of Alessandria, region of Piedmont
- San Filippo Neri, Castelfranco Piandiscò, a baroque-style, Roman Catholic church located in Castelfranco di Sopra, in the Valdarno of the region of Tuscany, Italy
- San Filippo Neri, Cingoli, a Baroque-style, Roman Catholic church in the town of Cingoli, Macerata, Marche, Italy
- San Filippo Neri, Cortona, a Roman Catholic church in the city of Cortona, Province of Arezzo, region of Tuscany, Italy
- San Filippo Neri, Genoa, a Baroque church in Genoa
- San Filippo Neri, Lodi, a late Baroque-style Roman Catholic church in central Lodi, region of Lombardy, Italy.
- San Filippo Neri, Macerata, a baroque-style, Roman Catholic church in Macerata
- San Filippo Neri, Ragusa, a Baroque-style, Roman Catholic church located in the city of Ragusa, in southern Sicily, Italy.
- San Filippo Neri, Recanati, a Baroque-style, Roman Catholic church in the town of Recanati, province of Macerata, region of Marche, Italy
- San Filippo Neri, Spoleto, a baroque-style, Roman Catholic church in the town of Spoleto, in the province of Perugia, region of Umbria, Italy
- San Filippo Neri, Turin, a late-Baroque style, Roman Catholic church located in Turin, region of Piedmont, Italy
- San Filippo Neri, Treia, a Baroque-style, Roman Catholic church in the town of Treia, province of Macerata, region of Marche
- San Filippo Neri, Vicenza, a Neoclassical-style, Roman Catholic church in Vicenza, Italy
- San Filippo Neri in Via Giulia, a deconsecrated church in Rome
- Oratory of San Filippo Neri, a restored late-Baroque religious structure in Bologna

== See also ==
- St. Philip Neri's Church (disambiguation)
