= St. Philip Neri's Church =

St. Philip Neri's Church may refer to:

== Italy ==
- San Filippo Neri, Camerino
- San Filippo Neri, Castelfranco Piandiscò
- San Filippo Neri, Cingoli
- San Filippo Neri, Cortona
- San Filippo Neri, Genoa
- San Filippo Neri, Lodi
- San Filippo Neri, Macerata
- San Filippo Neri, Ragusa
- San Filippo Neri, Recanati
- San Filippo Neri in Via Giulia, Rome
- San Filippo Neri, Spoleto
- San Filippo Neri, Treia
- San Filippo Neri, Turin

== Mexico ==
- Querétaro Cathedral, also known as St. Philip Neri Cathedral, Santiago de Querétaro

== Spain ==
- Church of Saint Philip Neri, Barcelona, Catalonia

== United Kingdom ==
- Church of St Philip Neri, Liverpool, Merseyside, England
- St Philip Neri Church, Mansfield, Nottinghamshire, England

== United States ==
- San Felipe de Neri Church, Albuquerque, New Mexico
- St. Philip Neri Parish Historic District, Indianapolis, Indiana
- St. Philip Neri's Church (Bronx), New York

== Venezuela ==
- St. Philip Neri Cathedral, Los Teques

== See also ==
- St. Philip Neri Church shelling, Sri Lanka
- St. Philip's Church (disambiguation)
