= St. Philip's =

St. Philip's may refer to:

- St. Philip's, Newfoundland and Labrador, Canada
- St. Philip's, Antigua and Barbuda
- Rural Municipality of St. Philips No. 301, Saskatchewan, Canada
- St. Philip's Castle, a fortress
- St. Philip's Cathedral, Birmingham, a Church of England cathedral
- St. Philip's Church (disambiguation)
- St. Philip's College (disambiguation)
- St. Philip's Episcopal Church (disambiguation)
- St Philip's Footbridge, a bridge in Bristol
- St. Philip's School, a grammar school
- Bristol St Philip's railway station

== See also ==
- Saint Philip (disambiguation)
