= Howell & Thomas =

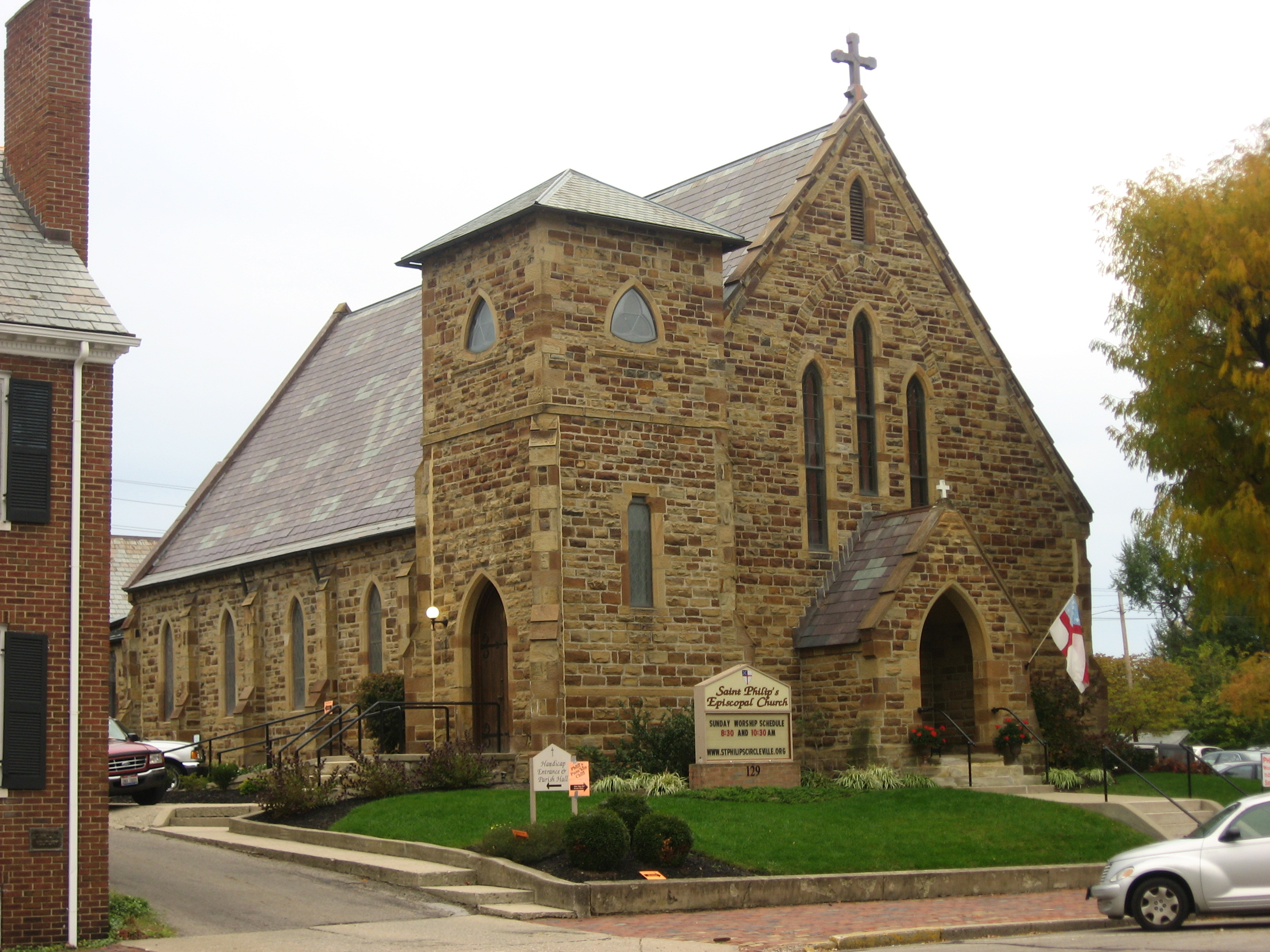
St. Philip's Episcopal Church in Circleville

Howell & Thomas was an American architectural partnership formed by Carl Eugene Howell (1879–1930) and James William Thomas, Jr. (1876–1973) in Columbus, Ohio, and later, Cleveland, Ohio, that designed many residences for wealthy clients between 1908 and 1930. The partners were classmates at University of Pennsylvania and first established their practice in Columbus, Ohio. They designed homes for the Euclid Golf subdivision along Fairmont Boulevard in Cleveland Heights, built on the site of John D. Rockefeller's once private course.

A number of their works are listed on the U.S. National Register of Historic Places.

Works include:

- Broad Street Apartments, 880–886 E. Broad St. Columbus, OH, NRHP-listed
- East High School, Columbus, OH
- Lincoln Road Chapel, Grandview Heights, OH
- Gannett Building, 55 Exchange St. Rochester, NY, NRHP-listed
- Labold House and Gardens, 633 Fourth St. Portsmouth, OH, NRHP-listed
- The Maramor, Columbus, OH
- Ringside Café, 19 North Pearl St., Columbus, OH
- Schoedinger State Street Chapel, 229 E. State St., Columbus, OH
- Saint Philip's Episcopal Church, 129 W. Mound St. Circleville, OH, NRHP-listed
- Trinity Episcopal Church Parish house, 125 E. Broad St., Columbus, OH
- Zanesville YWCA, 49 N. 6th St. Zanesville, OH, NRHP-listed
