= Elah Terrell =

Architect from Ohio

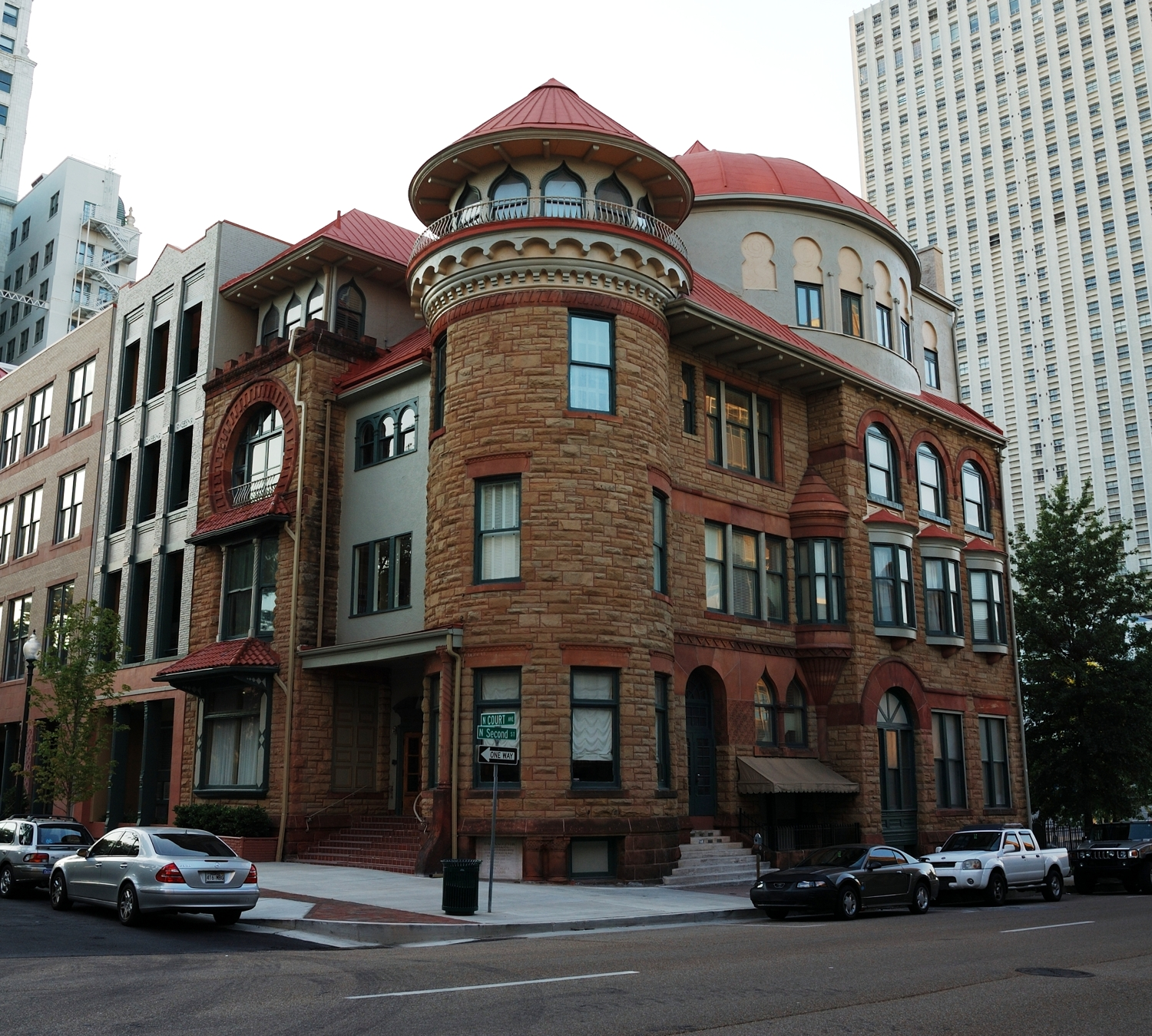
The Tennessee Club–Overall Goodbar Building in Memphis, Tennessee

Elah Terrell (1851–1920) was an American architect from Columbus, Ohio. Terrell designed important buildings under the company Elah T. Terrell & Co. in Ohio, notably in Sheffield, Lorain County, and Columbus. Terrell was a member of the Ohio chapter of the American Institute of Architects.

Terrell's office was in the Merchants and Manufacturers' National Bank building in Downtown Columbus, a building he designed.

Around 1888, Elah Terrell designed numerous structures in the Ohio State Fairgrounds. Several remain, including Power Hall, later known as Antiques and Collectibles, and an information booth or kiosk southeast of the Administration Building.

== Life ==
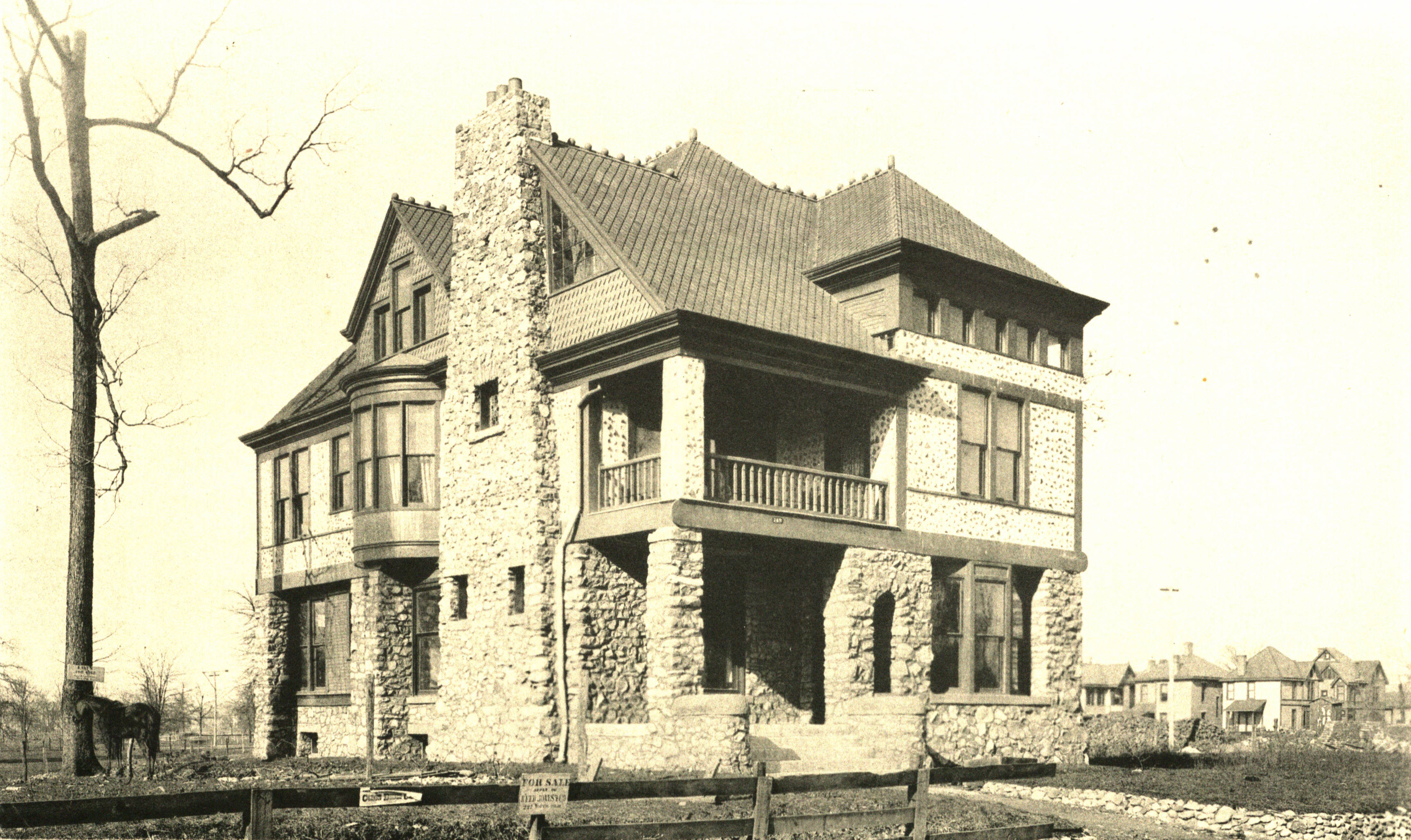
Terrell's house at 749 Dennison Avenue, c. 1889

Terrell was born in 1851, one of seven children of Jay and Etna Terrell.

Terrell married Isabel Gay, of Elyria, on January 2, 1884. They lived at a house in present-day Victorian Village in Columbus, Ohio. The house stood from 1888 to 1947, for most of its time beside the Peter Sells house facing Goodale Park. Terrell died on February 16, 1920.

== Notable works ==
- East Broad Street Presbyterian Church (Columbus, Ohio)
- Norwich Hotel (Columbus, Ohio)
- Merchants and Manufacturers' National Bank or National Bank of Commerce (Columbus, Ohio)
- Columbus Board of Trade Building (Columbus, Ohio)
- Clinton DeWeese Firestone mansion (Columbus, Ohio)
- Tennessee Club–Overall Goodbar Building (Memphis, Tennessee)
- Olde Towne Hall Theater (Ridgeville, Ohio)
- Elyria High School (Elyria, Ohio)
- Schools in Johnstown and Groveport, Ohio
- William Day House (Sheffield, Ohio)
- Sheffield Village Hall (Sheffield, Ohio)

== See also ==
- Architecture of Columbus, Ohio
