= Trinity Episcopal Church (Columbus, Ohio) =

Historic church in Ohio, United States

- U.S. National Register of Historic Places
- Columbus Register of Historic Properties
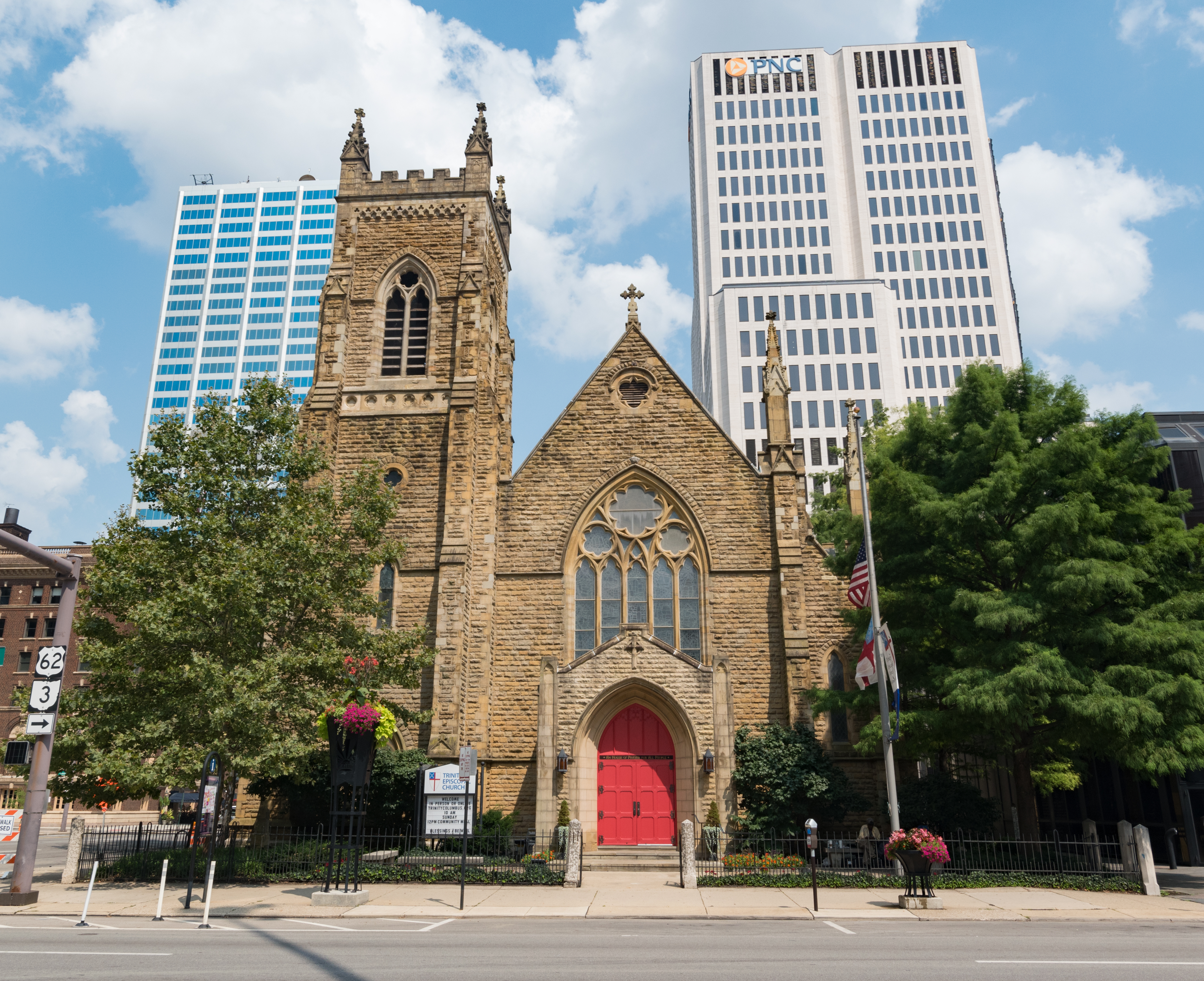
- Interactive map highlighting the church's location
- Location: 125 E. Broad St., Columbus, Ohio
- Coordinates: 39°57′44″N 82°59′51″W
- Area: less than one acre
- Built: 1866
- Architect: Gordon W. Lloyd; William Fish
- Architectural style: Gothic Revival
- NRHP reference No.: 76001427
- CRHP No.: CR-6

Significant dates
- Added to NRHP: November 13, 1976
- Designated CRHP: June 14, 1982

Trinity Episcopal Church is a historic church on Capitol Square in Downtown Columbus, Ohio. The church building was constructed in 1866 and added to the National Register of Historic Places in 1976. The congregation is part of the Episcopal Diocese of Southern Ohio.

In 2015, the church reported 349 members; in 2023, it reported 260 members. Plate and pledge financial support reported by the church in 2023 was $313,057. Average Sunday Attendance (ASA) reported in 2024 was 108 persons. This was a relative decrease on ASA of 185 in 2015.

The church features "The Church in the World", a stained glass window featuring Columbus landmarks and installed in 1965. Items depicted include a former Columbus flag, Ohio Stadium, the Ohio Statehouse, the LeVeque Tower, John Glenn Columbus International Airport, the Main Library and the statue of Christopher Columbus formerly at City Hall.

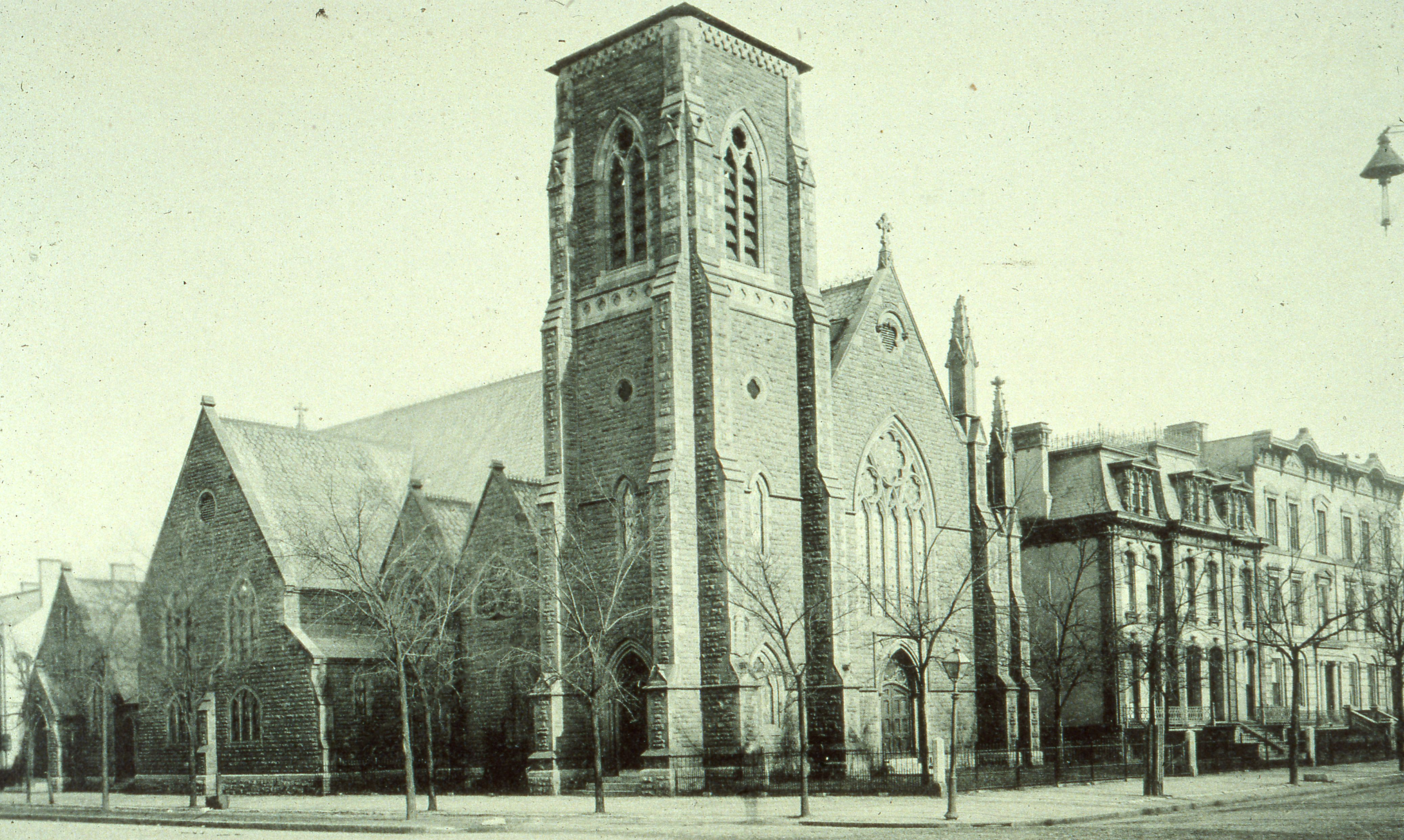
Trinity Episcopal Church as seen in 1889

The church's adjoining parish house was designed by Howell & Thomas and built in 1910. Another story was added to the parish house in 1976.

== See also ==
- National Register of Historic Places listings in Columbus, Ohio
