= St. Philip's Episcopal Church (Bradford Springs, South Carolina) =

Historic church in South Carolina, United States

- St. Philip's Episcopal Church, Bradford Springs
- U.S. National Register of Historic Places
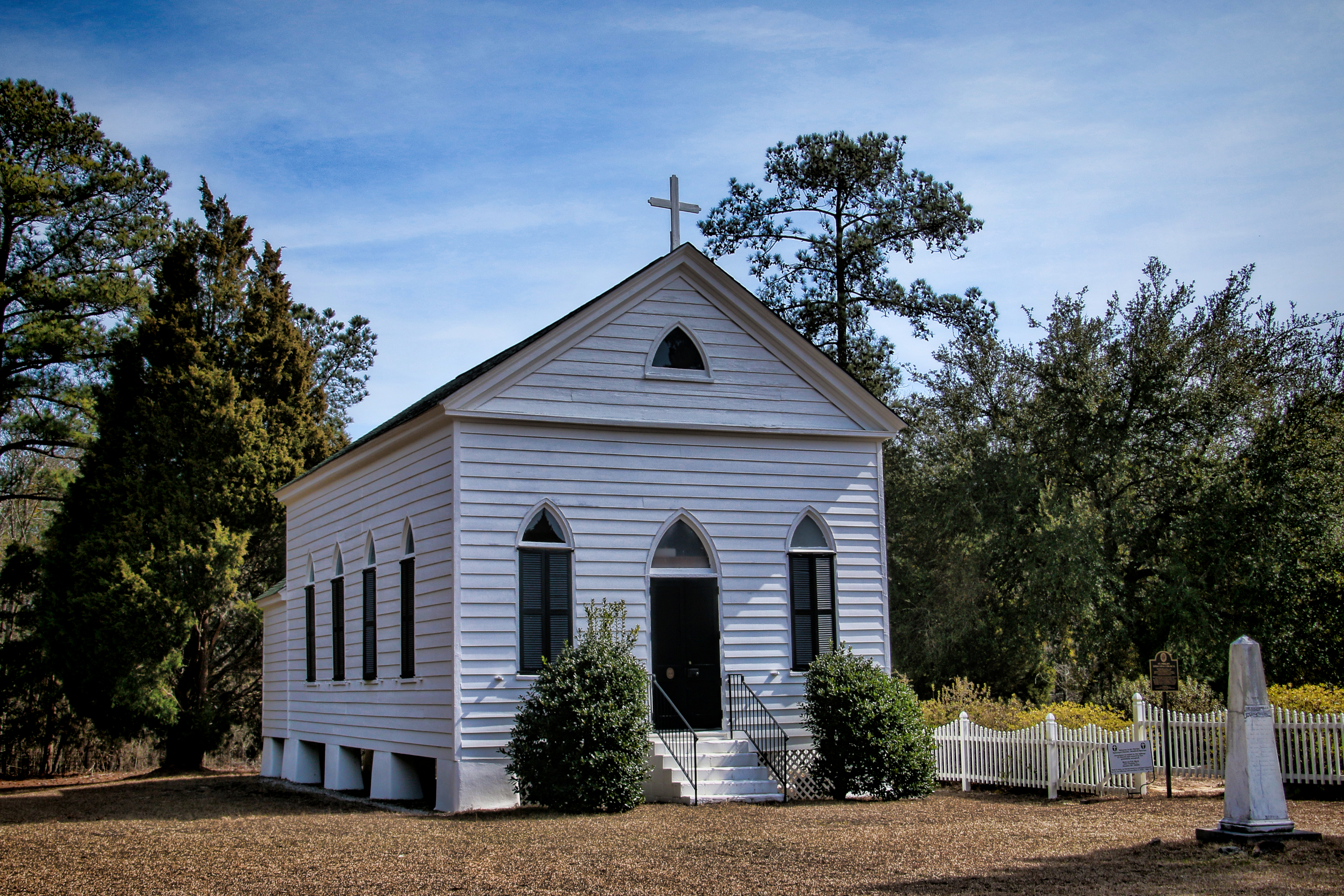

- Location within South Carolina Location within the United States
- Nearest city: Dalzell, South Carolina
- Coordinates: 34°6′13″N 80°25′33″W
- Area: 3.2 acres (1.3 ha)
- Built: 1840
- Architectural style: Gothic Revival
- NRHP reference No.: 96000406
- Added to NRHP: April 17, 1996

St. Philip's Episcopal Church is an historic Episcopal church located in the High Hills of Santee, in the antebellum summer resort community of Bradford Springs in Lee County, South Carolina, about six miles north of Dalzell.

It is no longer an active parish in the Episcopal Diocese of South Carolina, but the historic parish church is maintained by local descendants of the original members with assistance from the diocese.

== History ==
Built in 1840 in what was then part of Sumter County, it is an early example of the Carpenter Gothic style of architecture. It is unusual among such churches in featuring a pointed arch window in its front gable rather than the customary circular rose window. On April 17, 1996, it was added to the National Register of Historic Places.

== Cemetery ==
St. Philip's Cemetery is included in the historic place designation. Buried there is the Rev. Charles Pinckney Elliott, the first rector of the church.

== See also ==
- List of Registered Historic Places in South Carolina
- St. Philip's Episcopal Church
