= Giovanni Battista Contini =

Italian architect

- Born: 7 May 1641; Rome, Italy
- Died: 16 October 1723 (aged 82); Rome, Italy
- Occupation: Architect

Giovanni Battista Contini (7 May 1641 – 16 October 1723) was an Italian architect of the Baroque period.

He trained in Rome under Giovanni Lorenzo Bernini, but imbibed the influence of Francesco Borromini. He designed churches both in Lazio and the Marche. He designed two churches for the Oratorian order in Macerata and Cingoli.
