= Zanesville YWCA =

- U.S. National Register of Historic Places
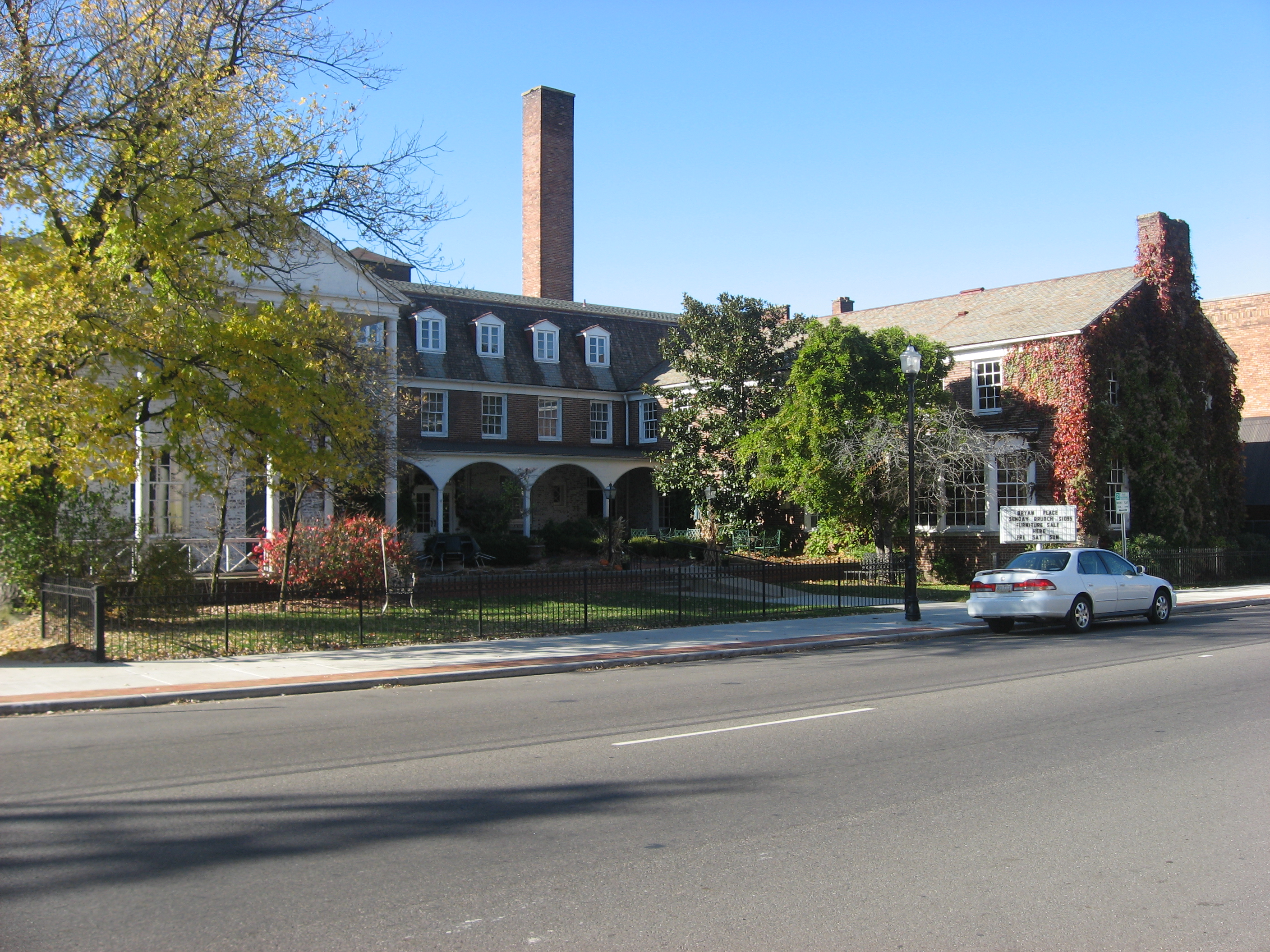
- Street view of the property

- Location within Ohio Location within the United States
- Location: 49 N. 6th St., Zanesville, Ohio
- Coordinates: 39°56′28″N 82°0′20″W
- Area: less than one acre
- Built: 1926
- Architect: Dunzweiler Const. Co.; Howell & Thomas
- NRHP reference No.: 78002168
- Added to NRHP: July 17, 1978

The former Zanesville YWCA, located at 49 North 6th Street in Zanesville, Ohio, United States, is an historic building built in 1926 for members of the Young Women's Christian Association. It was designed by Howell & Thomas. On July 17, 1978, it was added to the National Register of Historic Places. It is now Bryan Place.

== History and current use ==
The building was built in 1926 for members of the YWCA. Like many YWs of the time, the Zanesville YW provided rooms for single women to rent in addition to providing recreational and social activities for young women. The Zanesville YW closed in 1993 and the building is now Bryan Place.

== See also ==
- National Register of Historic Places listings in Muskingum County, Ohio
