= Columbus Board of Trade Building =

Former building in Columbus, Ohio

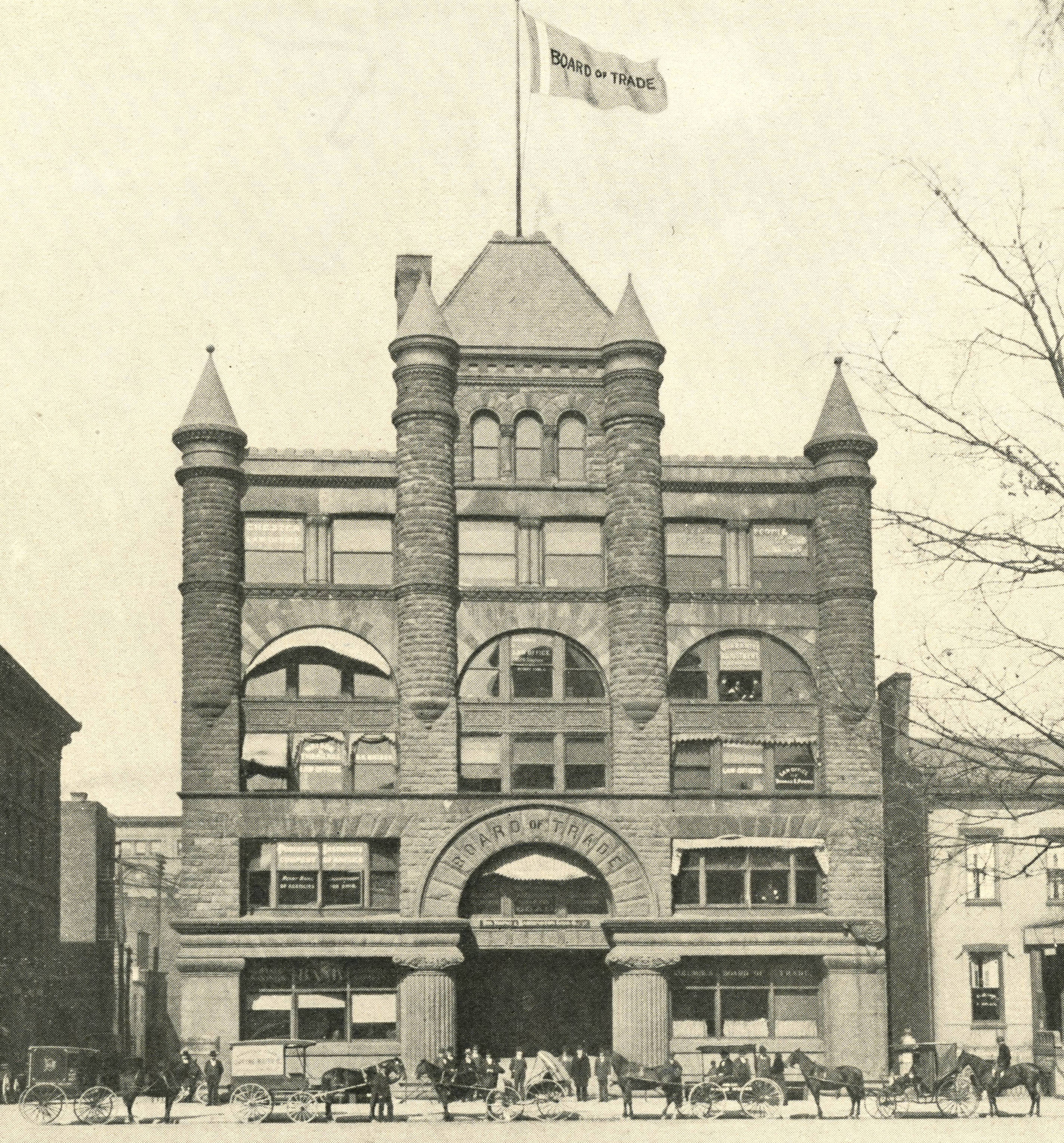
- Interactive map of the Columbus Board of Trade Building area

General information
- Architectural style: Richardsonian Romanesque, Gothic Revival
- Location: 30 E. Broad Street, Columbus, Ohio
- Coordinates: 39.96267°N 82.99966°W
- Groundbreaking: 1886
- Opened: July 23, 1889
- Closed: August 1964
- Demolished: December 1969

Technical details
- Floor count: 6

Design and construction
- Architects: Elah Terrell, Joseph W. Yost

The Columbus Board of Trade Building was a historic building on Capitol Square in Downtown Columbus, Ohio. The building was built in 1889 for the present-day Columbus Chamber of Commerce, and was designed by Elah Terrell and Joseph W. Yost. It became vacant in 1964 and was demolished five years later. The Rhodes State Office Tower sits on the site today.

== Attributes ==
The building was located on East Broad Street on the city's downtown Capitol Square, opposite the Ohio Statehouse. Its style has been described as Richardsonian Romanesque and Gothic Revival, with elements of both styles. The building's façade had three similarly-sized bays, with the central bay six stories tall, and side bays of five stories. Each bay was flanked with a column capped with a tall conical roof. The central bay featured a trio of round-arched windows separated by columns at its top level, capped with a steep hip roof. The main entranceway included two immense squat columns appearing to support a deep stone cornice as well as the large stone arch entrance. The exterior included smooth and rock-faced ashlar stone, used in combination on all floors of the building.

Early in the building's history, it was a prominent landmark on East Broad Street, and was built in a modern and fashionable style with weighty elements that reflected the permanence of both the Board of Trade and the city it represented. The building's arched windows and oversize entranceway gave an impression of importance and stateliness supporting the commercial role of the building.

== History ==
The building among others on Broad Street, 1965

The building housed the city's fourth and current organized chamber of commerce, which was established in 1884, initially headquartered at the old City Hall. In 1886, the group spent $45,000 to purchase a building known as the Buckeye House Hotel or Gardner House, built in 1837. Both its demolition and construction of the new building began that year. The total cost was about $165,000.

On May 3, 1888, workers removed scaffolding amid construction, unexpectedly collapsing a basement ceiling arch. Two people were killed and another worker was seriously injured. The event shocked the organization's members, who considered abandoning construction. Work nevertheless continued, and the building was opened on July 23, 1889.

The building had a 2,000-seat auditorium at the rear of the building, razed in 1932.

In 1964, the building became vacant as the chamber of commerce had moved to a location on North High Street. The Board of Trade Building was demolished in 1969, shortly after pieces of its façade fell to the street. The Rhodes State Office Tower sits on the site today.

== See also ==
- Ringside Café, formerly named the Board of Trade Saloon
