= Ringside Café =

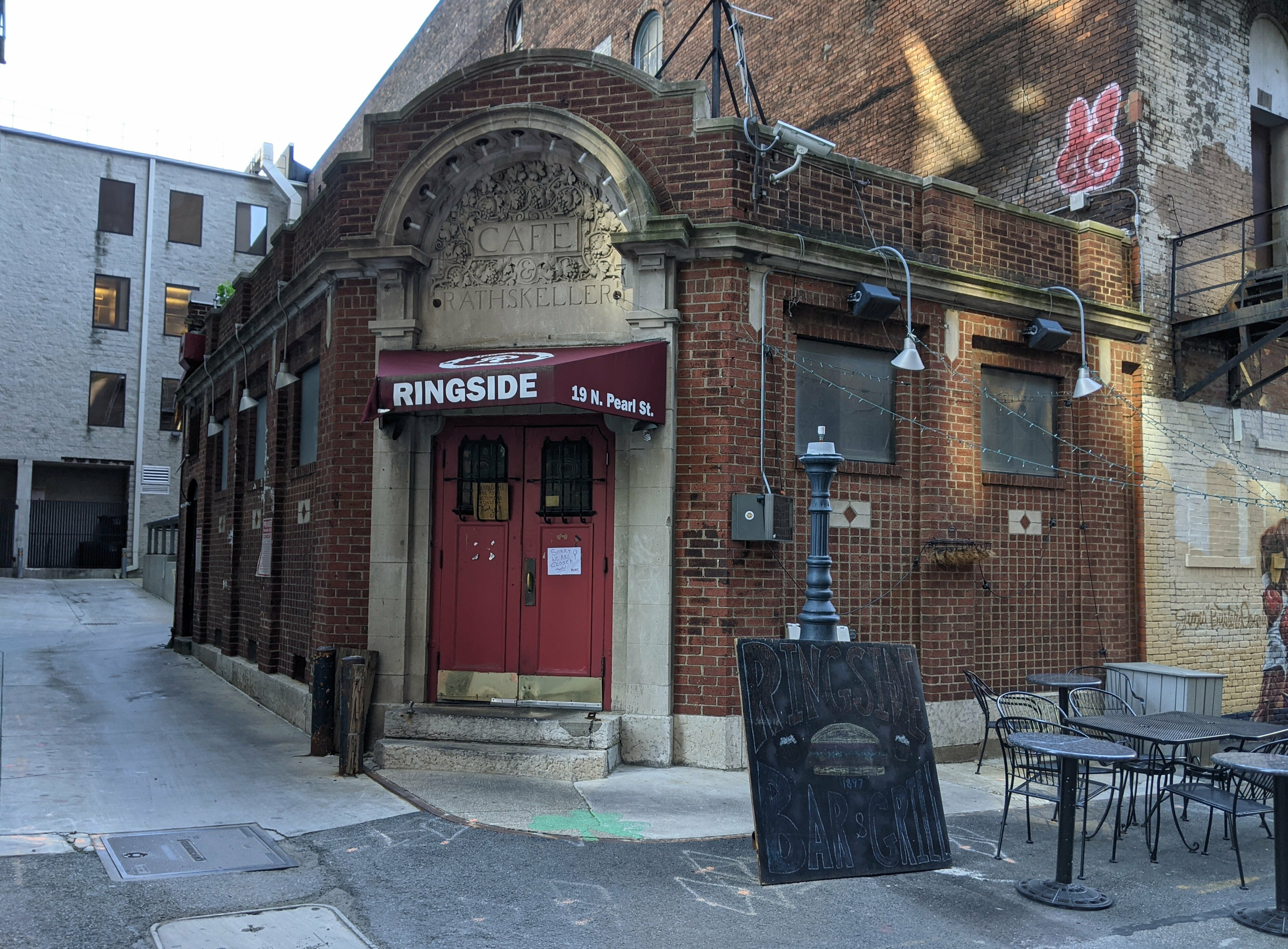
- During the COVID-19 shutdown

General information
- Architectural style: Arts and Crafts style
- Location: 19 North Pearl St., Columbus, Ohio
- Coordinates: 39.962890°N 82.999983°W
- Completed: 1910

Design and construction
- Architecture firm: Howell & Thomas
- Interactive map of Ringside Café

Restaurant information
- Established: 1897
- Owner: Adrian Rosu
- Previous owner: Clem Ambrose
- Website: ringsidecolumbus.com

Ringside Café is a restaurant and bar in Columbus, Ohio. The restaurant is considered the oldest bar or restaurant in downtown Columbus, having opened in 1897 and operated continuously since then. The restaurant has always been an attraction of politicians, lawyers, reporters, and lobbyists, given its proximity to the Ohio Statehouse, Columbus City Hall, and other government buildings.

== History ==
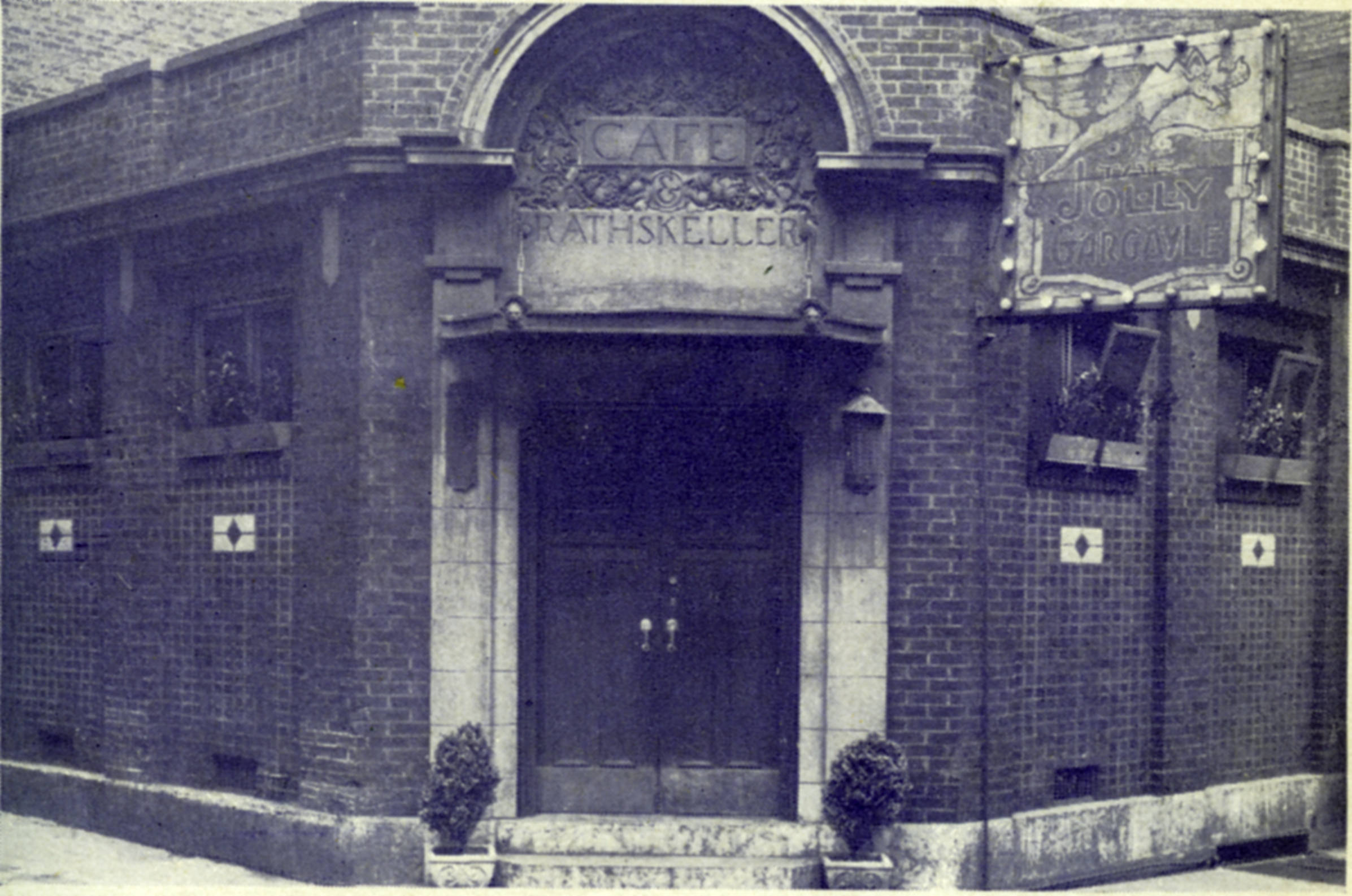
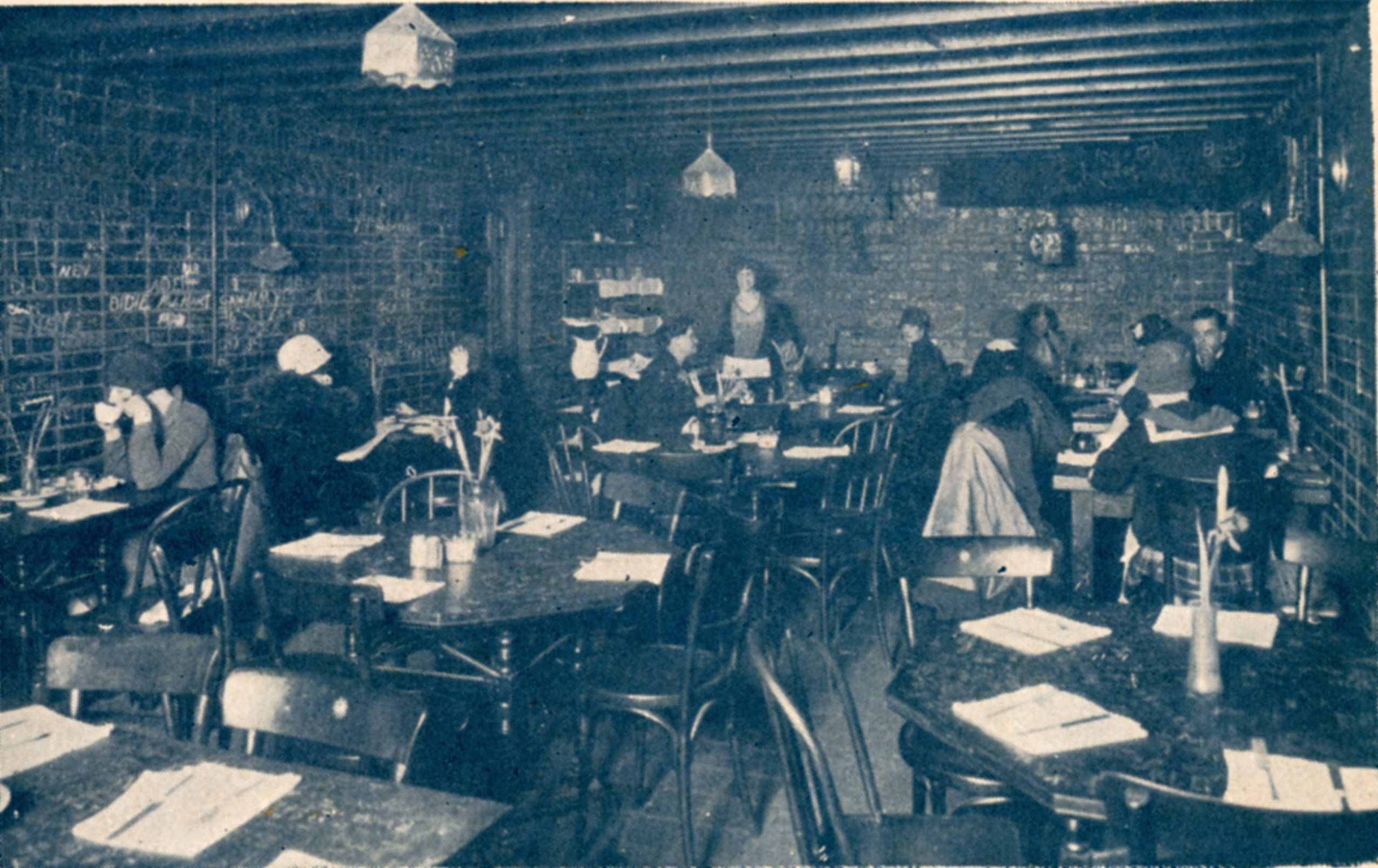
The Jolly Gargoyle exterior (1927) and interior (1929)

The bar first opened in 1897 as the Board of Trade Saloon, named for the nearby Columbus Board of Trade Building (no longer extant). The original building caught fire and was destroyed in 1909; the cause of the fire was unknown. In 1910, the owner E. Mithoff Nicholas rebuilt on the same site, hiring Carl Howell of Columbus-based firm Howell & Thomas. Howell was previously part of the prominent Yost & Packard firm, and had joined with James Thomas in 1908. The architectural design was unusual for the time, especially for such noted architects to design a bar. The new bar was named the Chamber of Commerce Cafe and Rathskeller, carved in stone above the doorway.

By May 1910, the Chamber of Commerce (the former Board of Trade) objected to its name associated with the bar. The offending top portion of bar's signage was then obscured, replaced with carved grapes and vines. The bar was replaced by the Jolly Gargoyle on March 6, 1920, serving as a tea house and antique shop while prohibition was a national law. Columbus reportedly did not take the alcohol ban too seriously, and beverages served there potentially had alcohol. One reporter claimed the tea house was named for stone gargoyles set over the doorway, which a truck knocked off the building. Jolly Gargoyle celebrated its ninth year of operation in March 1929.

The business was successful through prohibition, though it changed hands several times. In July 1933, Al Haft, a professional wrestling promoter, purchased the tavern with John McNamara and renamed it the Ringside. In the 1960s, Clem Amorose purchased the business. He appreciated the bar's atmosphere; it reminded him of a busy New York deli. He purchased a reproduction of a George Bellows painting depicting a gritty boxing match in New York; Bellows himself was Columbus-born and a New York City enthusiast. The Bellows reproduction still hangs inside above the main entrance. Amorose renamed it Clem's Ringside, and operated the business for about three decades.

The bar was sold and closed in January 1992 with Amorose in poor health; he died about a year later. It reopened that July with three new owners. The bar is currently owned by Adrian Rosu.

In 2012, the Columbus Landmarks Foundation released a book Historic Columbus Taverns: The Capital City’s Most Storied Saloons, which features Ringside Café. For several years around the release date, the authors gave tours of remaining taverns in the city, including Ringside.

During the COVID-19 pandemic in Columbus, Ohio, the bar closed, though it offered carryout and delivery services. Some of the business's rent payments were deferred. In May 2020, the business planned to reopen its outdoor patio with tables spaced seven feet apart, and using disposable menus and utensils, without requiring the use of masks. Ringside delayed the plan in late May, when the George Floyd protests had a violent beginning in downtown Columbus.

== Attributes ==
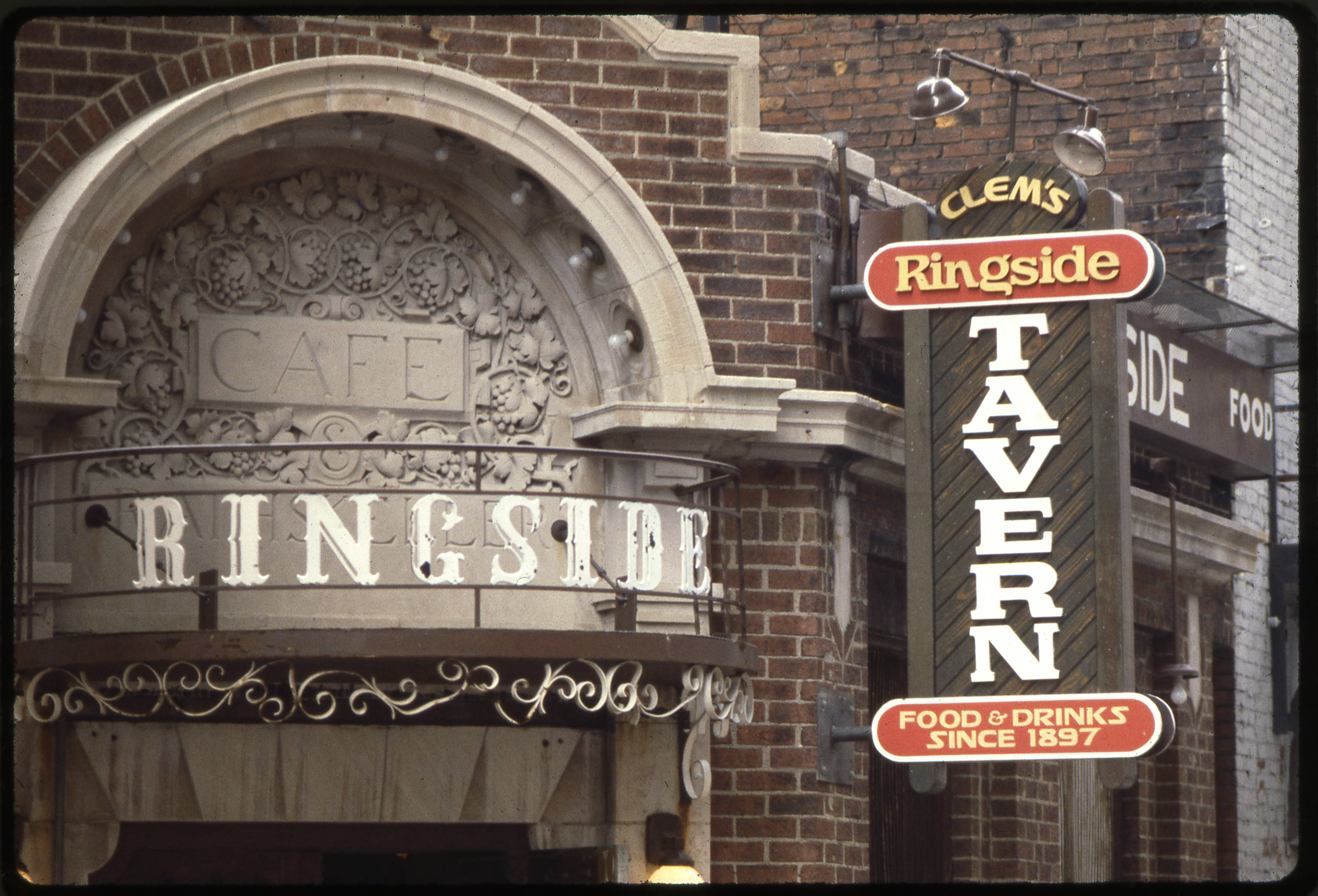
Bar signage c. 1970s

Ringside Café is situated on Pearl Alley in downtown Columbus. The alley and neighboring Lynn Street contain numerous restaurants and historic buildings amid skyscraper office buildings, near the Rhodes State Office Tower, the tallest building in Columbus, and behind the Hayden Building on Capitol Square. Ringside occupies one of the smallest buildings in downtown Columbus, measuring 25 by 37 feet (7.6 m × 11.3 m). It is scaled to the narrow alley it sits in, like other structures on Pearl Alley and the intersecting Lynn Street.

The one-story building has a limestone foundation and exterior walls of brick with recessed brick panels. The building's cornice sits above stone shield-shaped elements, appearing to support the cornice. Above the cornice is a brick parapet topped with a stone coping. The structure's entrance is made of stone and faces the alley at an angle, with double wooden doors with original stained glass below a narrow archway decorated with carved stone grapes and vines, as well as the etching "Cafe & Rathskeller", lit with electric bulbs. The building was designed in the Arts and Crafts style, popular at the time. It celebrated handmade works, and thus Ringside includes intricate tiled floors, some with mermaid depictions, storybook-style stained glass windows from Belgium, and dark wood carvings and features. The interior has an intimate scale and warm appearance, similar to an English pub.

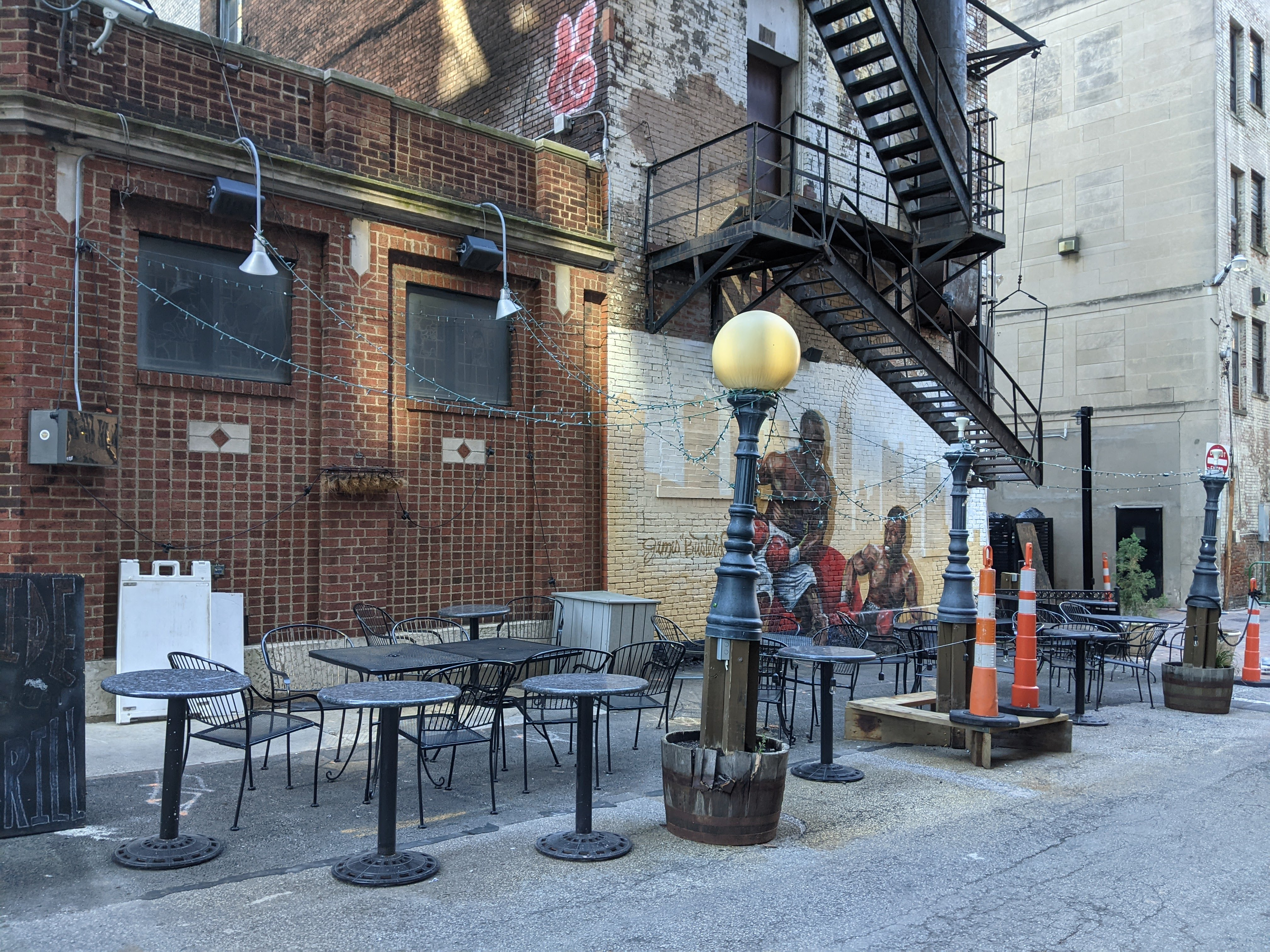
Outdoor seating

The building includes a first-floor bar and basement rathskeller. The first floor has numerous original features, including ten stools at the original bar with English oak, glass cabinet doors, carved ram heads, and floral designs. The room also has oak-paneled walls, a beamed ceiling made of tongue-and-groove hardwood, and three windows depicting a medieval feast. A fourth window, a double window added years later, has each half depicting a donkey and an elephant, symbols of the Democratic and Republican parties. Reportedly, a lit candle behind one of the windows would indicate if Republicans or Democrats were meeting there that evening. Another owner indicated previous owners would keep a light on one side or the other, depending on the party of the current governor. Despite many original features, changes have included electric lights replacing gas, a new basement fire escape, adding a dartboard and foosball table in the basement among its nine tables, and retiring the dumbwaiter after the grill was moved from the basement to the first floor. The basement also has "evidence of a door" that potentially led to a tunnel to the Ohio Statehouse. During renovations of Pearl and Lynn Streets in 2017, workers found underground vaults, or parts of basements which were not on drawings. The workers filled in the vaults as they were discovered.

A reproduced painting hangs over the main entrance inside the bar. The painting, called Stag at Sharkey's, by Columbus-born artist George Bellows, depicts boxer Jack Dempsey being thrown from the ring in a fight that he later won. Other elements added to the boxing theme have included a framed picture of Muhammad Ali, a punching bag handing from the ceiling, and the restaurant's burger names, all named for notable boxers.

Ringside Cafe was lauded in a 2019 article by 614 Magazine: "the burgers are juicy, the beers are cold, the lights are low, and the nostalgia runs deep." Ringside's burgers have also been positively reviewed by Columbus Navigator, and by celebrity chef Alton Brown.

The restaurant has always been an attraction of politicians, lawyers, reporters, and lobbyists, given its proximity to the Ohio Statehouse, Columbus City Hall, and other government buildings. It has drawn in entry-level staffers up to governors, including Ted Strickland and John Kasich, as well as Columbus mayor Michael Coleman. The business also sees a diverse crowd of office and maintenance workers downtown.
