= East Broad Street Presbyterian Church =

Historic church in Ohio, United States

- U.S. National Register of Historic Places
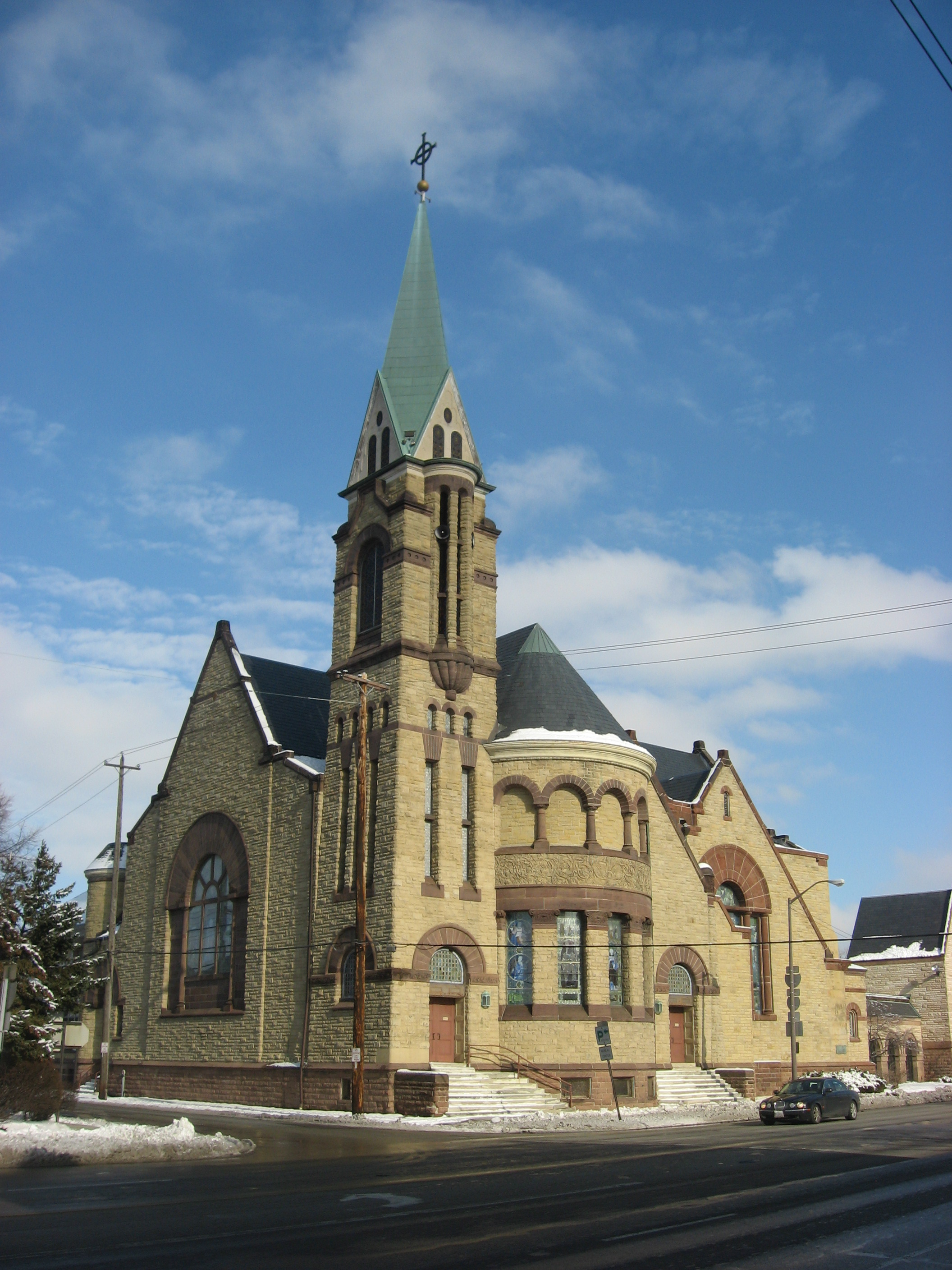
- View from the southwest
- Interactive map highlighting the church's location
- Location: 760 E. Broad St., Columbus, Ohio
- Coordinates: 39.964853°N 82.980288°W
- Area: less than one acre
- Built: 1887
- Architect: Elah Terrell; Frank Packard
- Architectural style: Richardsonian Romanesque
- MPS: East Broad Street MRA
- NRHP reference No.: 86003397
- Added to NRHP: March 17, 1987

East Broad Street Presbyterian Church is a historic church at 760 E. Broad Street in the King-Lincoln Bronzeville neighborhood of Columbus, Ohio. It was built in 1887 and added to the National Register of Historic Places in 1987.

The church was originally designed in the Richardsonian Romanesque style by architect Elah Terrell. In 1907-08 it was expanded to designs by Frank Packard.

The Rev. Amy Miracle is the pastor and head of staff of the church, the first woman to hold this title.

== See also ==
- National Register of Historic Places listings in Columbus, Ohio
