= Biblioteca Laudense =

Coordinates: 45°18′56″N 9°30′14″E

The Biblioteca Laudense is the main public library (Biblioteca Comunale) located on Via Solferino #72, in the town of Lodi, in the region of Lombardy, Italy. The library is in the Palazzo San Filippo, once housing the convent and chapel of the Oratorians. It now houses the library and a Civic Museum of Lodi.

== History ==
The Filippini had arrived in Lodi by 1622, and acquired this space by 1639. They began construction of the church of San Filippo in 1645. The structure, including the adjacent housing was rebuilt in 1740-1758, with completion of the large hall in the library with the ceiling frescoed by Carlo Innocenzo Carloni with the Glory of St Philip Neri. The Oratorians valued both devotion and knowledge and completed the large walnut cabinets for storing books. The structure was unfinished in 1791 when the French occupation led to the suppression of the order, and creation of a public library.

In its origins, the library had some 2000 volumes donated by the government. But with the suppression of the orders, the collection was added the 2000 books of the Filippini, 100 volumes and 40 manuscripts of the cloistered Augustinians, and 100 volumes from the Cappuccini di Casalpusterlengo. The library now includes 120 incunabula, including:

- Fr. Umbertus, De veris et falsis virtutibus, (1466).
- Macrobius Aurelius Theodosius, Expositio in Sermone Scipionis by MT Ciceronis (Cicero), (1472).
- Opus primae partis summae super totam theologiam, (1473).
- Da Bergamo fr. Petrus, Tabula super omnia opera. San Thomae. Bononiae (Bologna), Azoguidi, (1473).
- Biblia sacra. Venetiis, (1475).
- Comissarius Antonius, Contra omnes fere aegritudines. Brisciae (Brescia), per ff de Colonia, (1476).
- Augustinus Dati, Isagogicus libellus in eloquentiae praecepta. Mediolani (Milan), tipografia Lavagna, (1476).
- Albertus da Padua, Expositio Evangeliorum Dominicalium et festivalium. Venetiis (Venice), (1476).

It conserves antique manuscripts, including:

- Illuminated and engraved manuscripts and musical treatises by Franchino Gaffurio, (1496)
- Various manuscripts by Maffeo Vegio, including a De significatione verborum in jure civili published in 1477 in Venice.
- Liber jurìum civitatis Laudae, (1280).
- Statuta Laudensia, (1234).

The library contains ancient topographical maps of Lodi, six atlanti, six musical manuscripts, and autographed manuscripts of Antonio Magliabechi; Francesco Redi; Giovanni Mario Crescimbeni; Duchess Anna Farnese, Eleanor of Austria, Queen of Poland; and Christina, Queen of Sweden. The library has Letters from cardinals Decio Azzolini; Pietro Vidoni, Vincenzo Monti, and Lazzaro Spallanzani.

It has a collection of engravings, including a translation of Virgil, by frate Atanasio, and printed in 1473 on parchment.

An inventory from 1877 lists 18,000 volumes including editions of the Aenid by the Greek Atanasio, published in parchment in 1476 Vicenza by Ermanno Levilapide (Lichtenstein of Cologne); a De imitatione Christi (1488) published in Venice; 16th-century cartographical charts. The library also has many documents relating to Lodi history.

The library has a collection of 120,000 volumes including parchment books, manuscripts, codices, incunaboli, and engravings. The initial core of the collection was the 1810 acquisition by the commune of the Oratorian library. Added to this, were the collections of Carlo Mancini, a local nobleman. The library has a monument dedicated to cavaliere Carlo Mancini, a local nobleman, and one of its prime donors, and a stucco bust of Francesco de Lemene; as well as many portraits of famous Lodigiani.
