= St. Philip's Church =

St. Philip's Church may refer to:

== Australia ==
- St Philip's Anglican Church, Kingswood, New South Wales
- St Philip's Church, Sydney, New South Wales
- St Philip's Church, Culham, Western Australia

== United Kingdom ==
- St Philip's Church, Alderley Edge, Cheshire
- St Philip's Church, Avondale Square, Camberwell, London
- St Philip's Church, Hassall Green, Cheshire
- St Philip's Church, Hove, East Sussex
- St Philip's Church, Kelsall, Cheshire
- St. Philip's Church, Pennyfoot Street, Nottingham
- St Philip's Church, Salford, Greater Manchester
- St. Phillip's Anglican Church (British Virgin Islands)

== United States ==
- St. Philip Church (Norwalk, Connecticut)
- St. Philip AME Church, Savannah, Georgia, historic place in Chatham County, Georgia
- St. Philip's Church in the Highlands, Garrison, New York
- St. Philip's Church, Brunswick Town, North Carolina
- St. Philips Moravian Church, Winston-Salem, North Carolina
- St. Philip's Episcopal Church (disambiguation), multiple places

== See also ==
- St. Philip's Episcopal Church (disambiguation)
- St. Philip Neri's Church (disambiguation)
