= Tennessee Club–Overall Goodbar Building =

- U.S. National Register of Historic Places
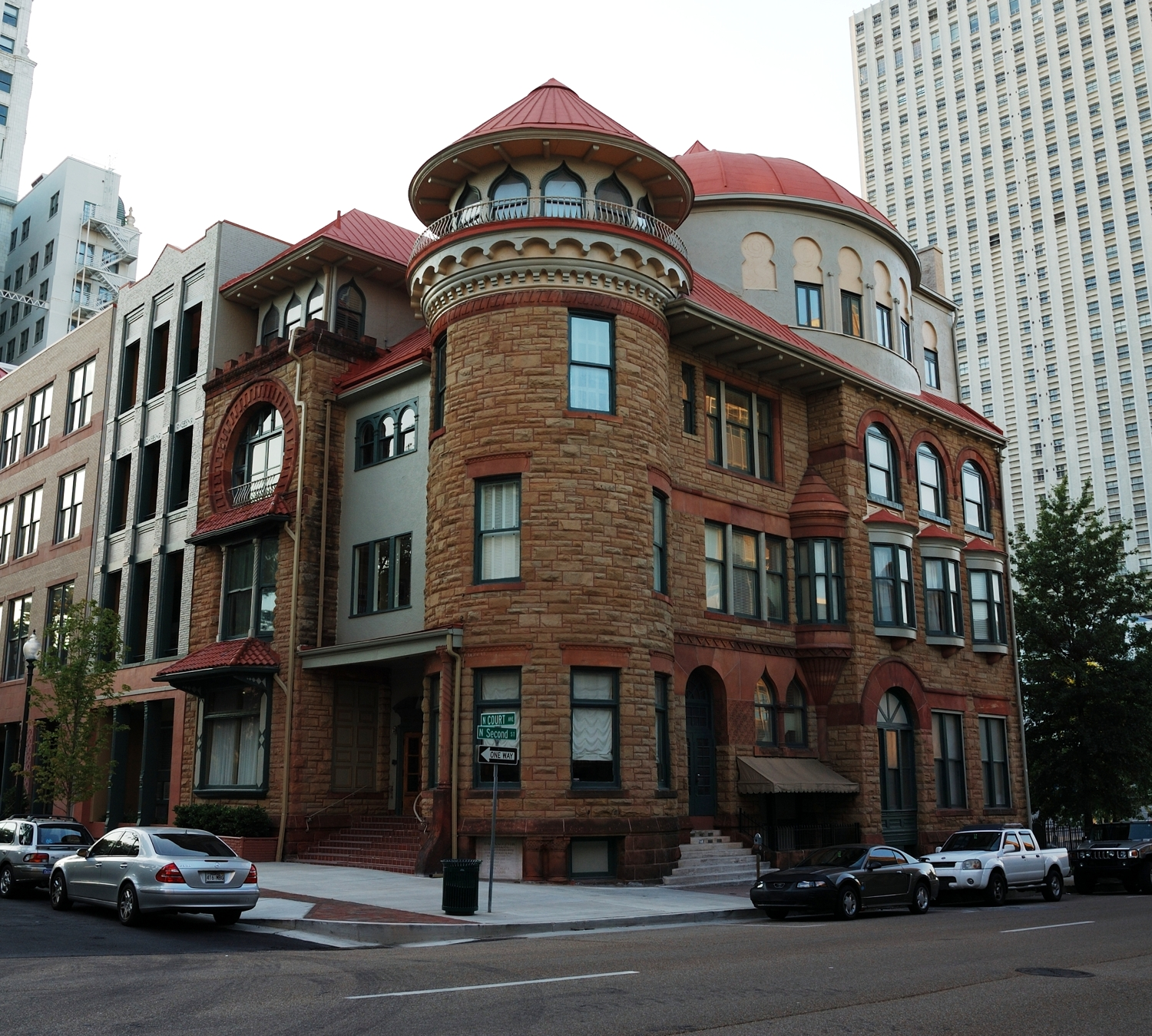
- The Tennessee Club in 2010

- Location within Tennessee Location within the United States
- Location: 128--130 Court Avenue, Memphis, Tennessee
- Coordinates: 35°8′47″N 90°3′4″W
- Area: less than one acre
- Built: 1888
- Architect: Elah Terrell
- Architectural style: Exotic Revival, Romanesque, Moorish
- NRHP reference No.: 82004056
- Added to NRHP: April 22, 1982

The Tennessee Club, also known as the Overall Goodbar Building, is a historic townhouse in Memphis, Tennessee, U.S.. Designed by architect Elah Terrell, it was built in 1888 for two doctors by the names of Overall and Peete. Colonel William F. Taylor, a veteran of the Confederate States Army who served under General Nathan Bedford Forrest during the American Civil War, also had an office in the building. By 1890, it became the home of the Tennessee Club, a social club founded in 1875. From 1907 to 1927, it was home to Overton and Overton, a real estate firm. It has been listed on the National Register of Historic Places since April 22, 1982.
