= St. Philip's College =

St. Philip's College may refer to:

- St. Philip's Christian College (New South Wales, Australia), an independent co-educational Christian school
- St. Philip's College (Northern Territory, Australia), a private, coeducational boarding school
- St. Philip's College (United States), a community college in San Antonio, Texas
