= San Filippo Neri, Casale Monferrato =

Roman Catholic church in Casale Monferrato, Italy

Coordinates: 45°08′15″N 8°27′17″E

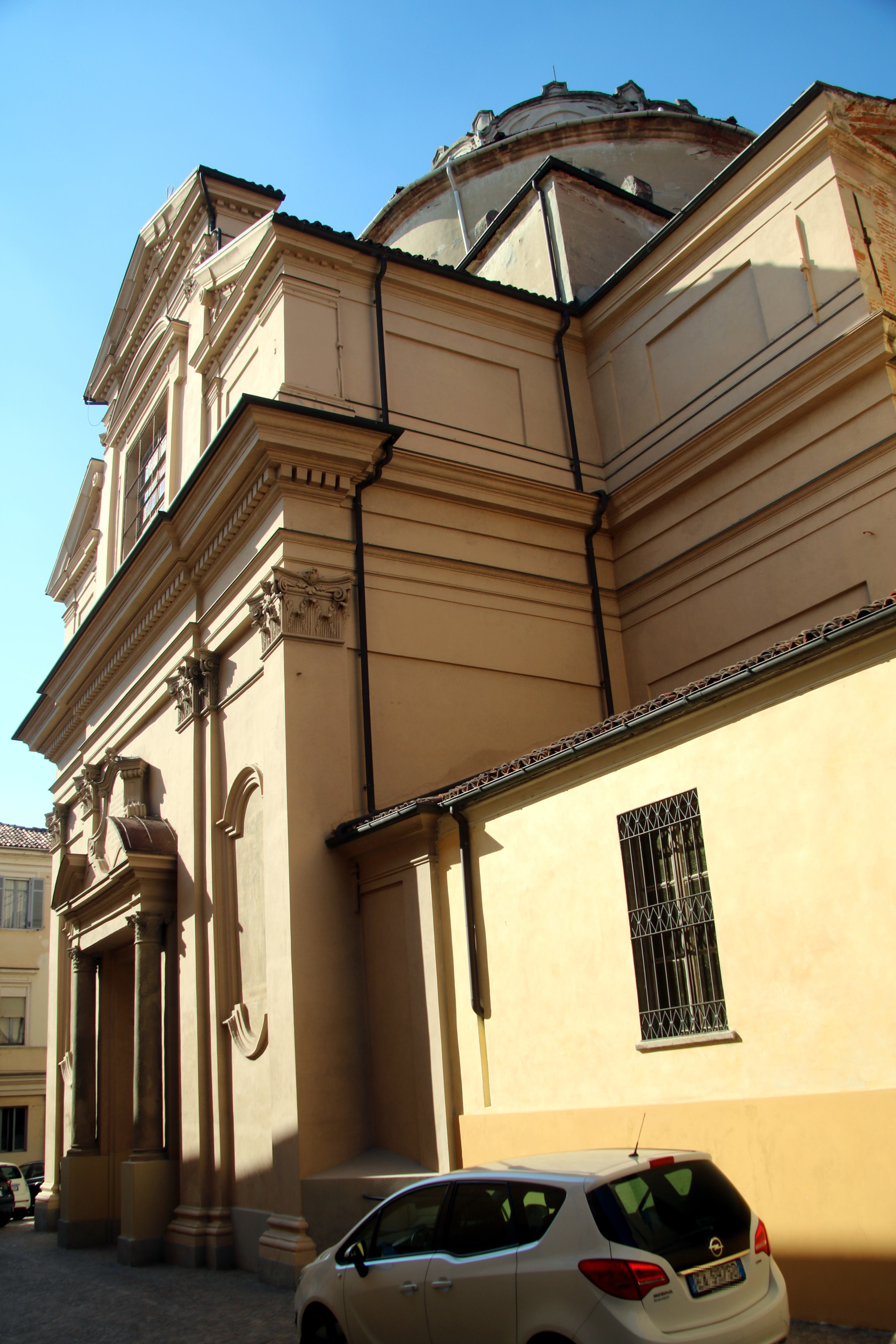

San Filippo Neri is a Baroque-style, Roman Catholic church located on Via della Biblioteca, in Casale Monferrato, Province of Alessandria, region of Piedmont, Italy.

== History ==
A church at the site was built in its present form in the 18th century for the Oratorians and consecrated in 1721. The initial design was by Pietro Negri, and completed by Andrea Felli, with help by the engineer Giovanni Battista Scapitta. The church has a central layout with two lateral altars. The ceilings, spandrels, and cupola were frescoed in the 19th century. The church houses canvases depicting the Guardian Angel and St Michael Archangel by Guglielmo Caccia.
