= St. Philip's Episcopal Church =

St. Philip's Episcopal Church, or variants, may refer to several buildings in the United States:

- St. Philip's Episcopal Church (Wrangell, Alaska), listed on the National Register of Historic Places (NRHP)
- St. Philip's in the Hills Episcopal Church, Tucson, Arizona, NRHP-listed
- St. Philip's Episcopal Church (Harrodsburg, Kentucky), NRHP-listed
- St. Philip's Episcopal Church (Boyce, Louisiana), NRHP-listed in Rapides Parish
- St. Philip's Episcopal Church (Trenton, Missouri), NRHP-listed
- St. Philip's Episcopal Church (Rosebud, Montana), NRHP-listed
- St. Philip's Episcopal Church (Manhattan), New York, NRHP-listed
- St. Philip's Episcopal Church (Brevard, North Carolina), NRHP-listed
- St. Philip's Church (Brunswick Town, North Carolina), NRHP-listed
- St. Philip's Episcopal Church (Durham, North Carolina)
- St. Philip's Episcopal Church (Germanton, North Carolina), NRHP-listed
- St. Philip's Episcopal Church (Circleville, Ohio), NRHP-listed
- St. Philip's Episcopal Church (Bradford Springs, South Carolina), NRHP-listed
- St. Philip's Church (Charleston, South Carolina), NRHP-listed
