= San Filippo Neri, Cortona =

Church in Cortona, Tuscany, Italy

Church of San Filippo Neri
- Chiesa di San Filippo Neri
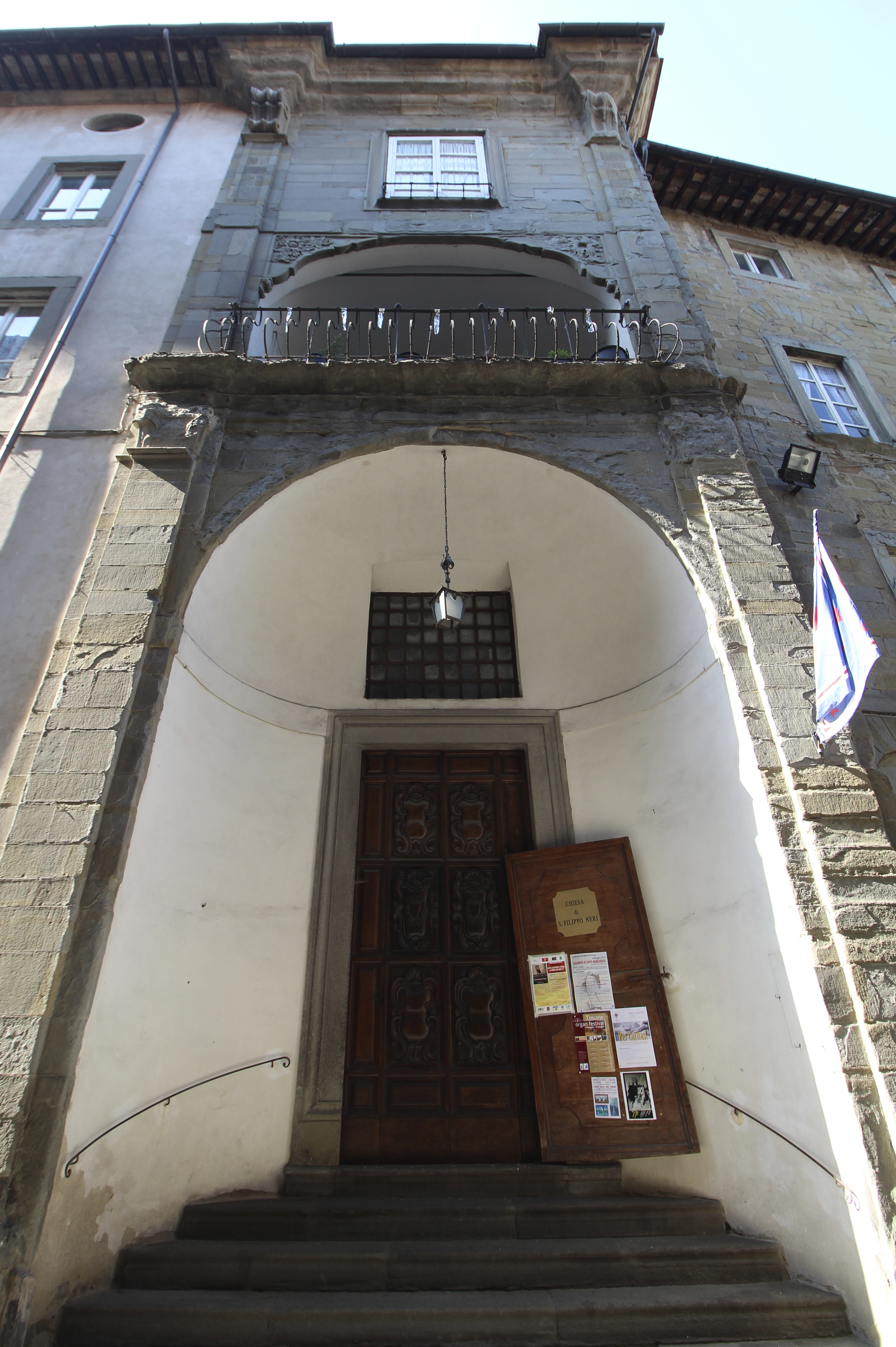

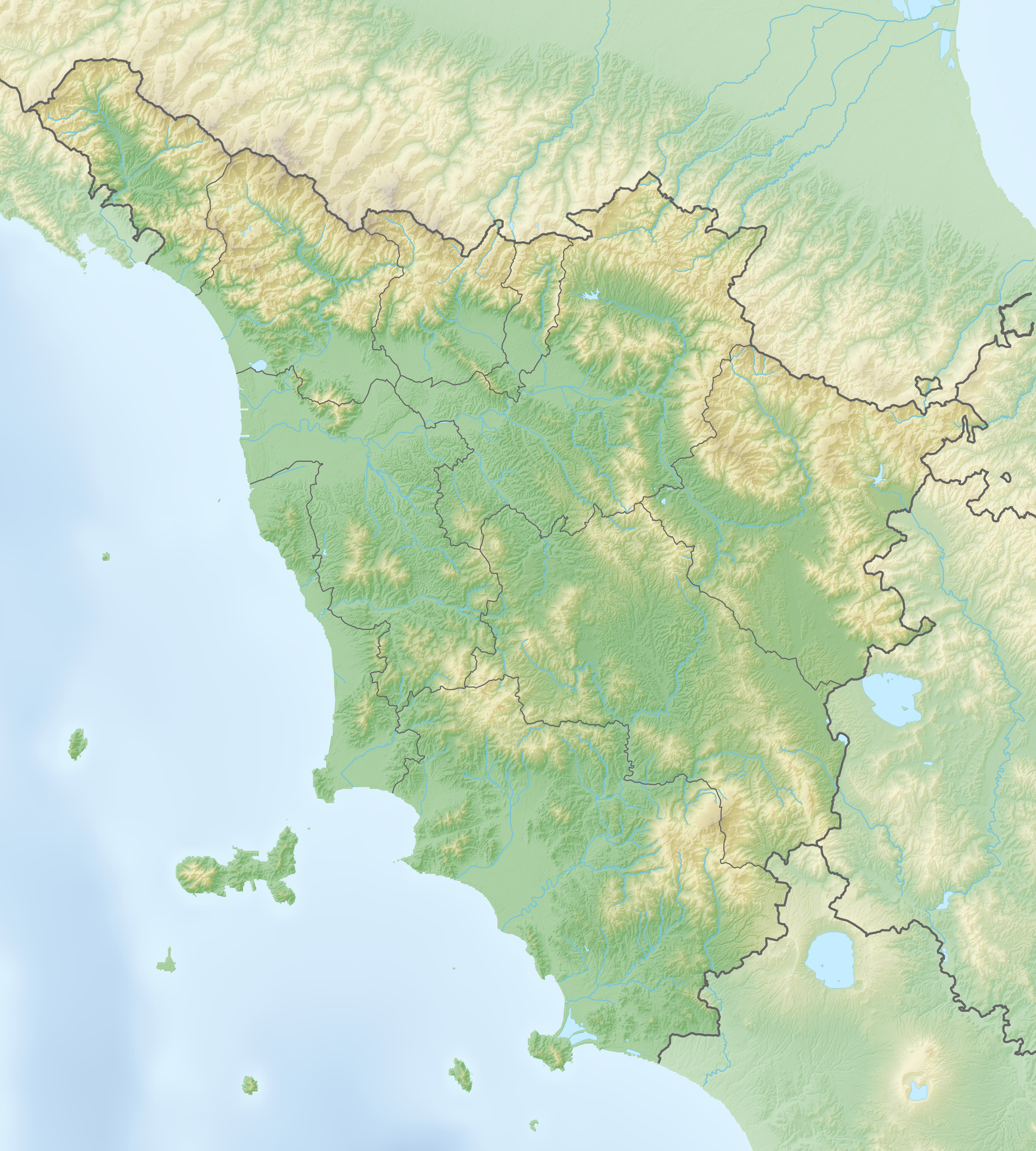
- Location within Tuscany Location within Italy
- 43°16′31″N 11°59′04″E
- Denomination: Roman Catholic

Architecture
- Groundbreaking: 1677
- Completed: 1738

San Filippo Neri is a 17th-century, Roman Catholic church located on Via Roma in the city of Cortona, Province of Arezzo, region of Tuscany, Italy.

== History ==
In 1669, a congregation of priests under the invocation of St Phillip bought the house of Niccolò Mancini on Via Santa Maria for 500 scudi, and built there an oratory. In 1677, they received the donation of the house of Maddalena Venuti, and bought a contiguous house, and began construction of a church. Construction soon paused until 1696, when a new design by the priest Antonio Linelli, and construction was complete by 1738. The main altar was designed by Francesco Fabbrucci. The main altarpiece (1745) depicting Santa Lucia was painted by Cammillo Sagrestani. In the sacristy, which was once the oratory, there were two paintings also attributed to Sagrestani. The canvas depicting Saints Andrew, John the Baptist, Joseph, and the Madonna was painted by Piazzetta. This painting once faced a St Phillip Neri exorcises the Possessed by Domenico Venuti. In the chancel is a Presentation of Jesus at the Temple by Ranieri Del Pace. The chapel on the left of the entrance once had a Guardian Angel (1718) by Giovanni Battista Grati.

There was a St Phillip before the Virgin and Jesus at Gesthemane (1675) attributed to Antonio Taddei called Il Ballerino.

At the altar near the pulpit there was a St Francis of Paola that miraculously levitates a man falling from a scaffold in a bridge (1740) painted by Francesco Cappella. Now there is a Madonna likely a copy of a work by Guido Reni.

In the first altar on the left of the main door, there is a small Tobias and the Angel by Chialli. Next to the front door is a plaque commemorating the poet Antonio Guadagnoli, who founded the Compagnia della Misericordia of Cortona.

The church was stuccoed in 1713 by brothers Passardi of Montepulciano. The paintings in the ovals of the cupola were executed by Taddeo Mazzi. The ovals of the nave are the work of Francesco Fabbrucci.
