= San Filippo Neri, Lodi =

Church in Lodi, Italy

Coordinates: 45.315667°N 9.503878°E

San Filippo Neri is a late Baroque-style Roman Catholic church located on Corso Umberto in central Lodi, region of Lombardy, Italy.

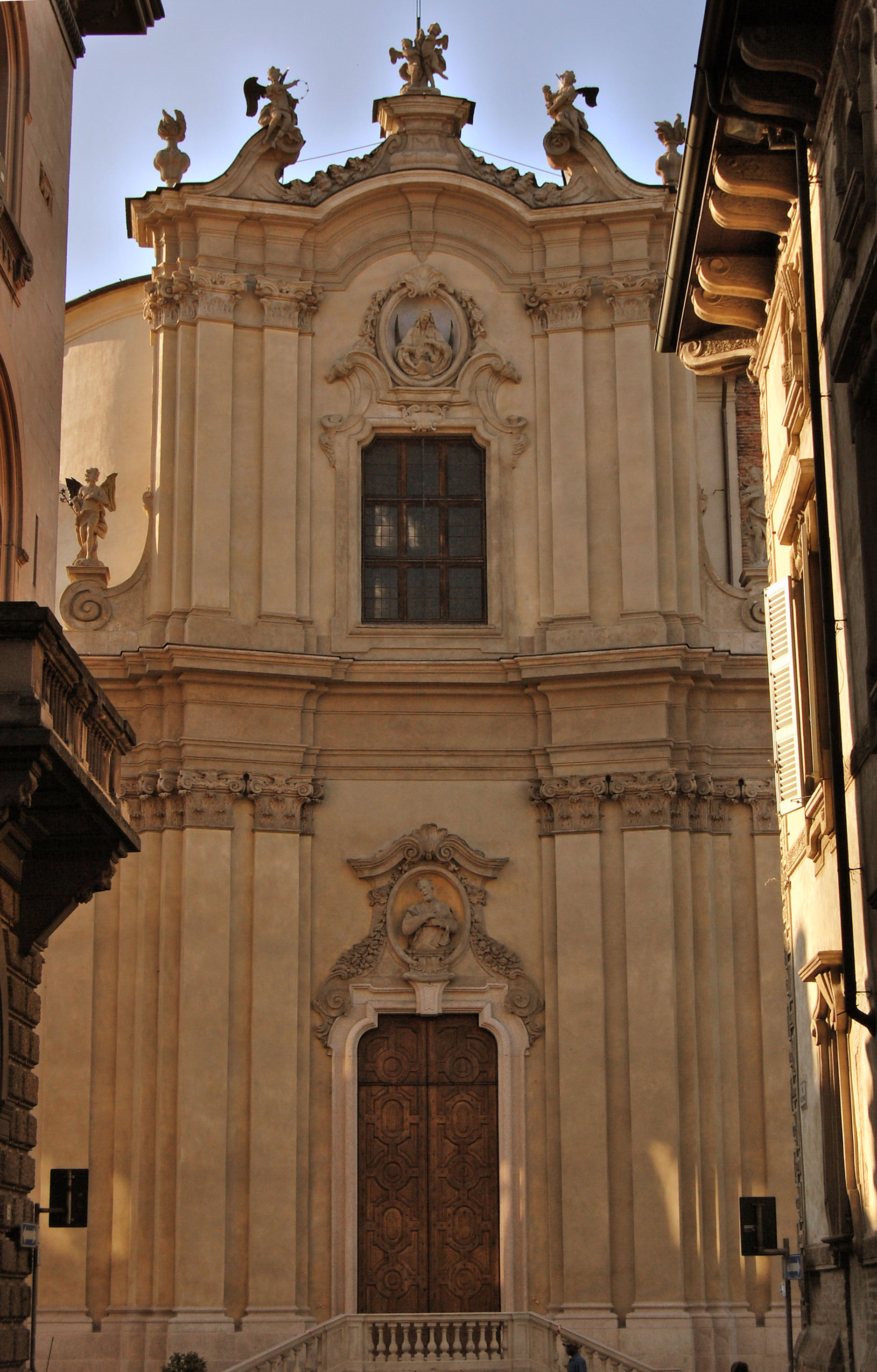
Facade of San Filippo

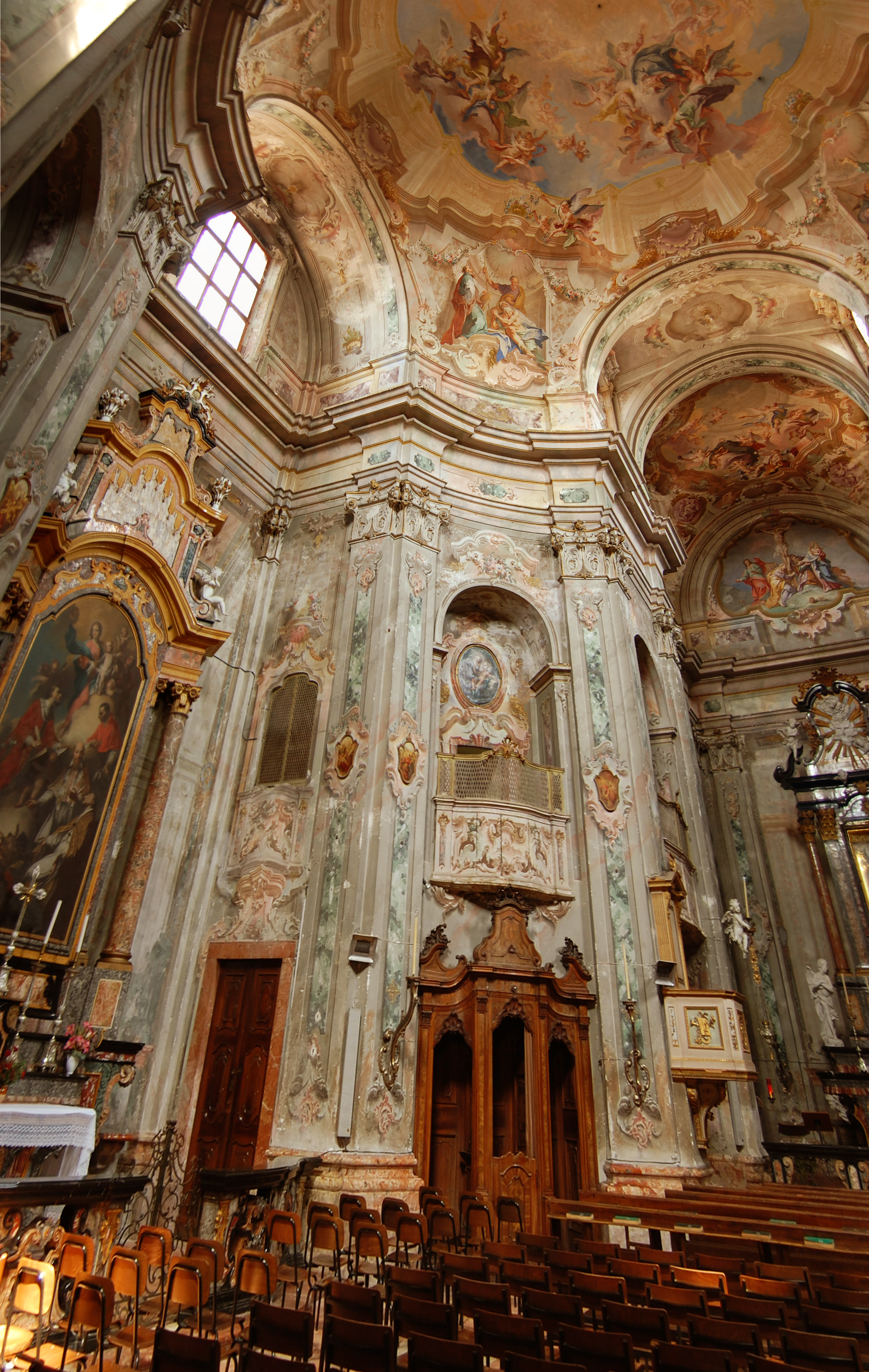
Interior with frescoed walls and ceiling.

== History ==
The church, dedicated to St Phillip Neri, was designed by the brothers Pietro Giacomo, Michele, and Domenico Sartorio and built during 1740-1745. The Sartori also completed some of the statuary. The interior is extravagantly decorated, with frescoed surfaces and polychrome altars. The nave ceiling and walls were frescoed (1756) by Carlo Innocenzo Carloni and his studio. The scenes depict the Glory of St Phillip, a Holy Trinity, and the Crucifixion at the apse. The cupola is frescoed with the Assumption of the Virgin and the spandrels with the Evangelists. The wooden choir above the entrance was painted by Federico Ferrari. The organ (1779) was built by the Serassi brothers of Bergamo. Other works are by Giorgio Federico Fochezer and Giovanni Battista Trotti.

The Rococo facade, designed by Antonio Veneroni, is narrow but adventurously scenographic: it rises at the end of a street, convex, with a bust of St Phillip inside an oval niche above the portal, and an Immaculate Conception in an oval supported by scrolls above the upper central window. Two stories of echoing pilasters with corinthian capitals at the sides. The tympanum is interrupted and sports a roofline of playful cherubim and angels, along with flaming vases. The decorative entrance door is preceded by a balustrade and flanking staircases. The layout is that of a Greek Cross.

== Civic Museum and Biblioteca Communale Laudense ==
Alongside is the former convent, now converted in the Civic Museum and Biblioteca Laudense, built by the Fillipini, and open to the public in 1792.
