= San Filippo Neri, Cingoli =

Church in Cingoli

Coordinates: 43°22′28″N 13°13′03″E

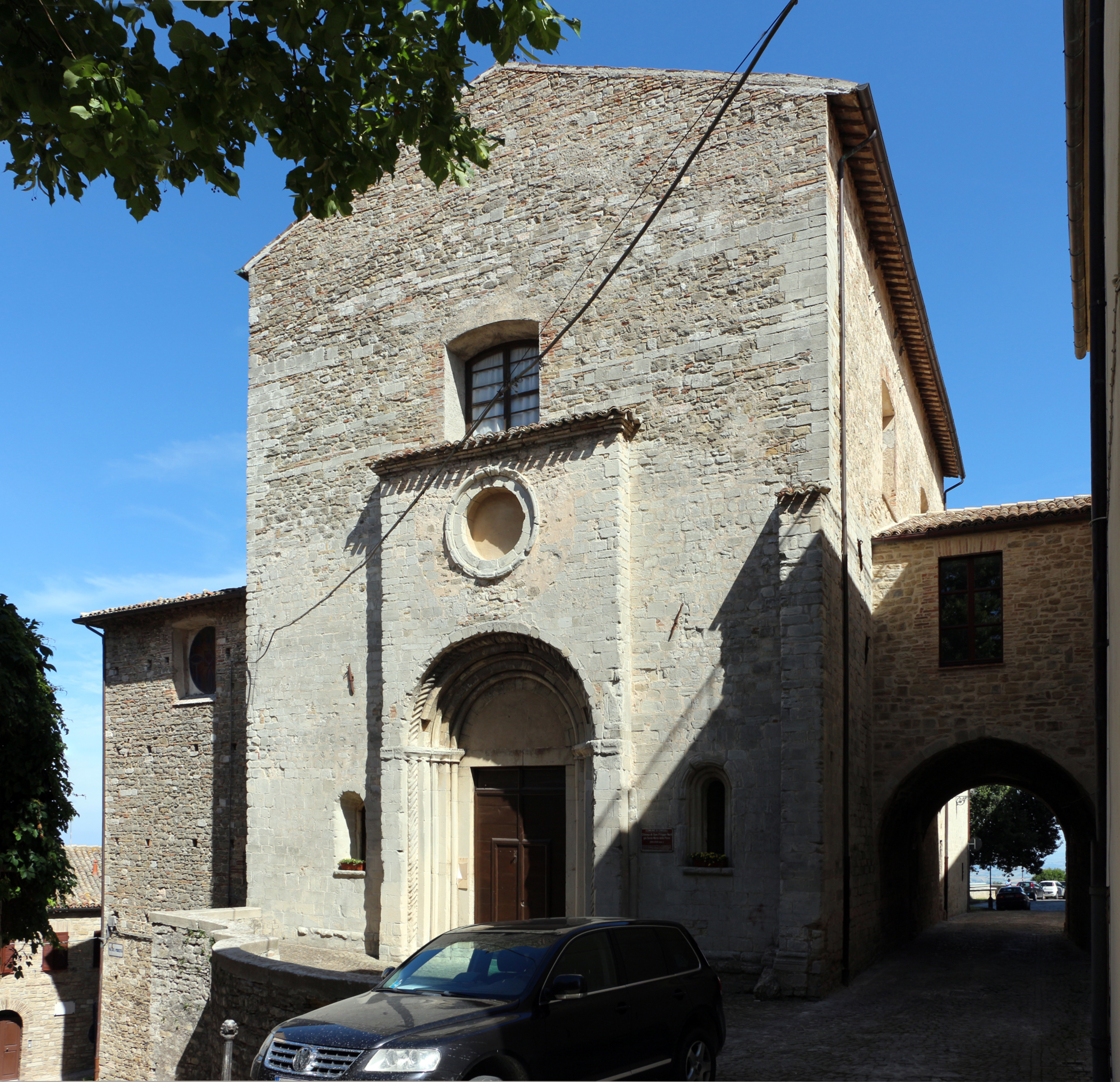
San Filippo Neri (Cingoli)

San Filippo is a Baroque-style, Roman Catholic church located on via San Filippo in the town of Cingoli, Macerata, Marche, Italy.

== History ==
A parish church which was probably dedicated to the Virgin was present at the site before it was elevated to the status of a collegiate church in 1530. It was assigned to the Oratory of St Phillip in 1664. This medieval church was razed to allow the construction of this Baroque edifice in 1671 under the direction of Giovanni Battista Contini, who had trained in Rome. The façade dates to the earlier building. The interior has an elliptical layout, recalling some of Borromini's projects in Rome. The sacristy also has a centralized octagonal plan. Instead of chapels, there are two side altars. The ceiling is frescoed with two medallions depicting scenes from the life of the titular saint: a St Philip in Adoration of the Virgin and a Glory of St Philip. The nave also has allegorical depictions of the Theological Virtues, and depictions of the Doctors of the Church and Evangelists. Paolo Marini painted Old Testament Stories, and the Fathers of the church. He also painted the altarpiece depicting the Madonna, the Trinity and the Guardian Angel on the first altar on the right. The altarpiece of the Ecstasy of Saint Teresa of Avila (1688) was painted by Carlo Cignani.
