= San Filippo Neri, Macerata =

Church in Macerata, Marche, Italy

Coordinates: 43°17′58″N 13°27′08″E

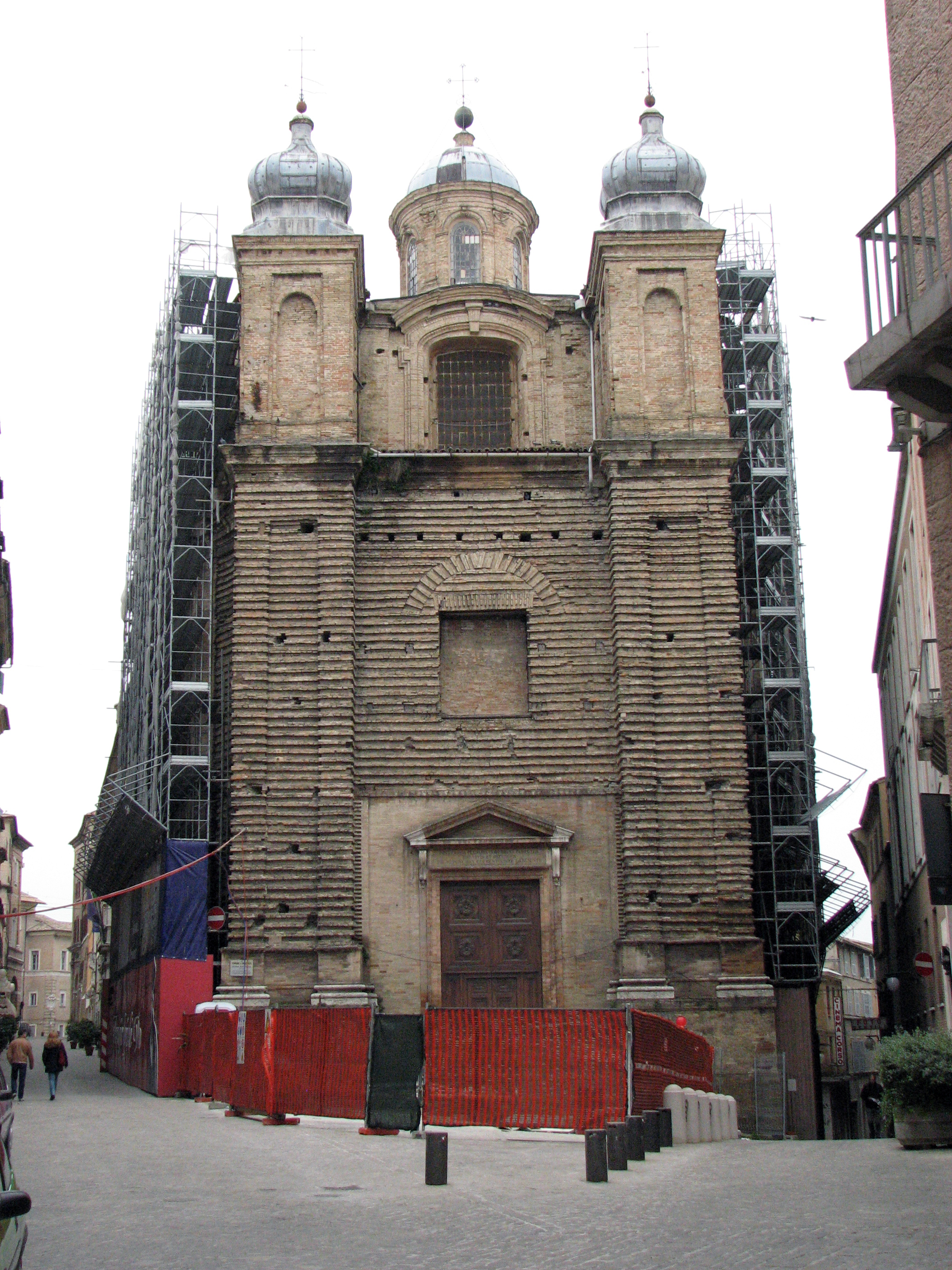
San Filippo Neri

San Filippo Neri is a baroque-style, Roman Catholic church located on the intersection of Corso della Republica and via Santa Maria della Porta, in central Macerata, region of Marche, Italy.

== History ==
This church was built by 1611, 2 years after the canonization of San Filippo Neri. It was enlarged and reconsecrated in 1647. A redesign of the layout, hedged as it was in a narrow lot, was commissioned in 1689 by the architect was Giovanni Battista Contini, and completed between 1707 and 1730. The sacristy was completed between 1774 and 1785, but the facade remains unfinished in brick. The oratory was complete by 1718 and by 1742, the convent, now housing the offices of the provincial government.

The layout recalls the influence of Borromini and Bernini, specifically the latter's and Carlo Rainaldi's plan for Santa Maria di Montesanto, with an oval main nave surrounded by four shallow chapels with the far end opening to a deeper presbytery. The interior is richly decorated with colored marbles.

The first altar on the right houses an altarpiece depicting the Birth of the Virgin attributed to Girolamo Donnini. The second altar on the right houses an altarpiece depicting the Madonna and Child with Saints Joseph and Anthony of Padua (1755) by Marco Benefial. The first altar on the left houses an altarpiece depicting the Madonna and St Cajetan adore the Child Jesus (1634) by Ludovico Trasi. The second altar on the left houses an altarpiece depicting the Crucifixion (1737) by Francesco Mancini (1679-1758). Mancini also painted the main altarpiece depicting the Madonna and Child with St Phillip in Glory.

The main altar (1764-1770) was completed in polychrome marble by Giovanni Bonessi.
