= San Filippo Neri, Spoleto =

Church building in Spoleto, Italy

Coordinates: 42.440831°N 12.44112°E

San Filippo Neri is a baroque-style, Roman Catholic church located in the town of Spoleto, in the province of Perugia, region of Umbria, Italy.

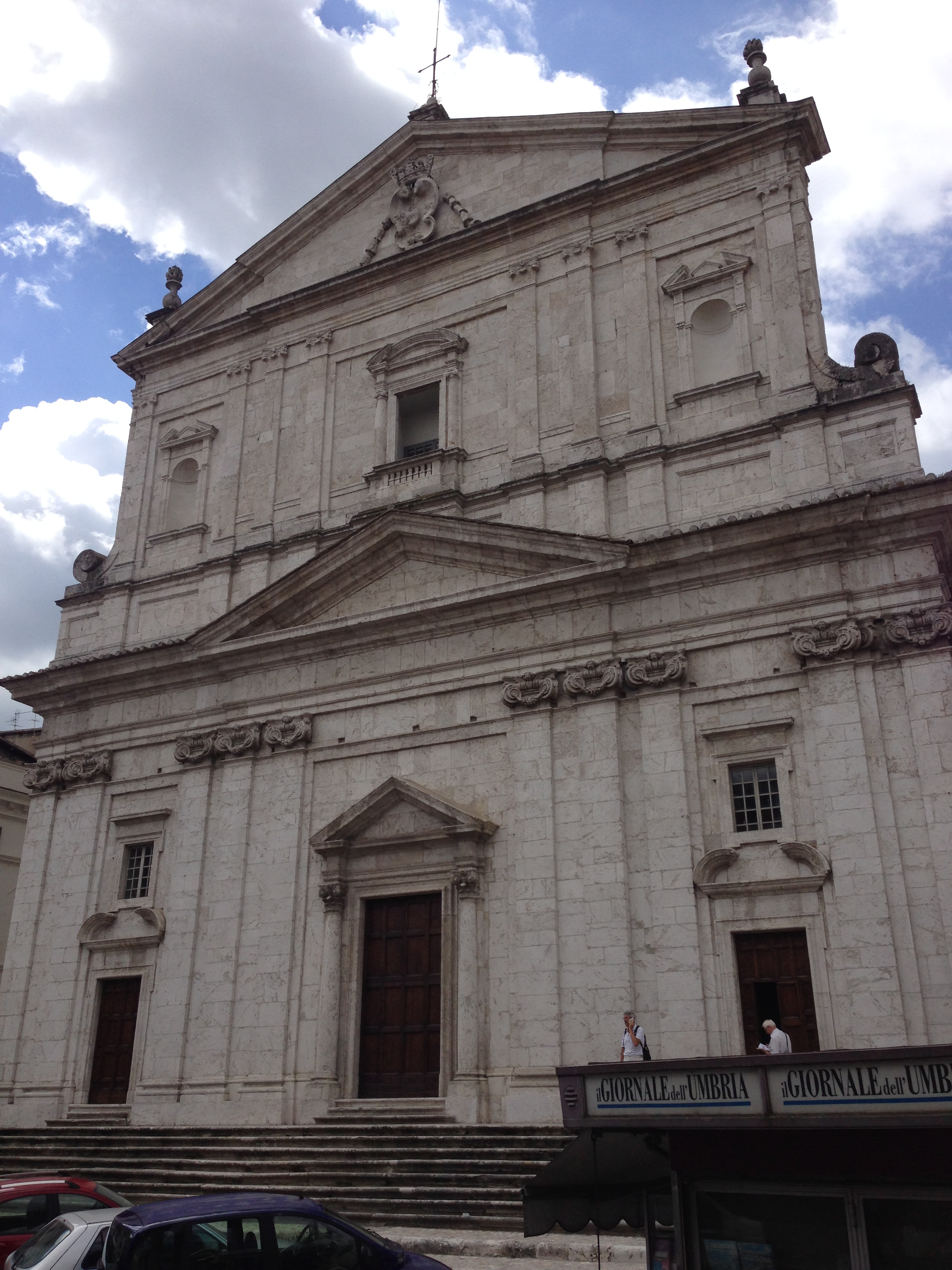
Facade of San Filippo Neri

== History ==
The church was begun in 1640, using designs by Loreto Scelli, and consecrated only in 1724. The stone façade has varied tympani over the doors and windows, and the verticality is accentuated by corinthian pilasters. The interior has paintings by Gaetano Lapis, Sebastiano Conca, Pietro Labruzzi and Francesco Refini.
