= San Filippo Neri in Via Giulia =

Church of Saint Philip Neri
- Chiesa di San Filippo Neri (in Italian)
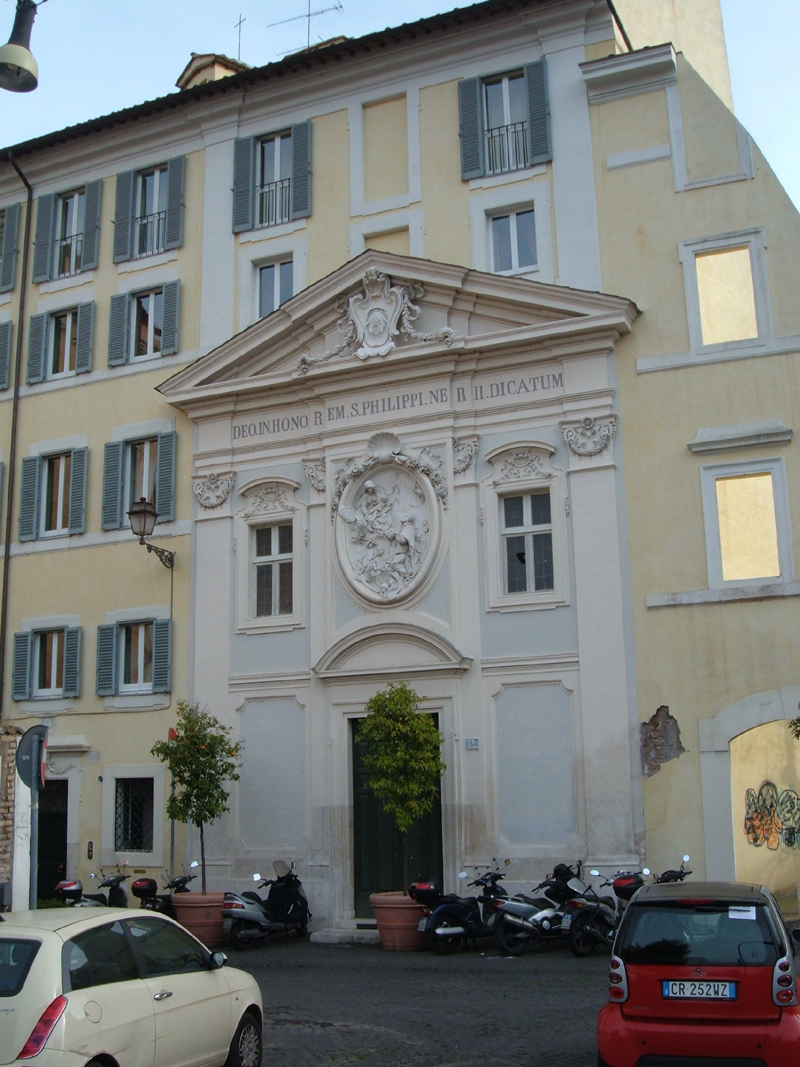
- The facade of the building along Via Giulia
- Click on the map for a fullscreen view
- 41°53′49.8″N 12°28′2.8″E
- Location: Rome
- Country: Italy
- Denomination: Roman Catholic
- Tradition: Roman Rite

History
- Status: Association Church
- Dedication: Saint Trophimus; Philip Neri
- Consecrated: 1623

Architecture
- Functional status: Deconsecrated in 1938
- Architect: Filippo Raguzzini
- Architectural type: Church
- Style: Baroque
- Groundbreaking: 1623
- Completed: 1768
- Construction cost: 500 scudi (renovation in 1728)

Specifications
- Materials: Stone, Brickwork

San Filippo Neri is a deconsecrated church in Rome, important for historical and artistic reasons. The church, facing the Via Giulia, was built during the Baroque age. San Filippo was supposed to be demolished together with the surrounding neighborhood in the late 1930s, but due to the onset of WWII the demolition was halted. Abandoned and desecrated after the war, it has been restored in 2000, but maintains a secular usage and is not accessible.

== Location ==
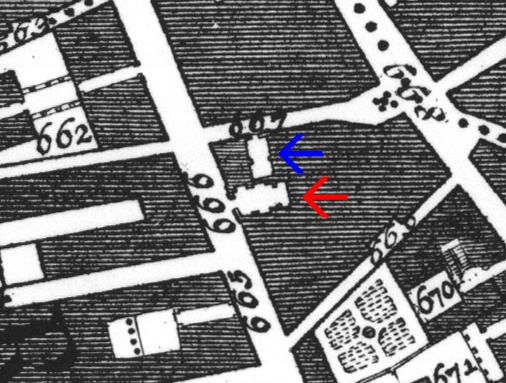
San Filippo Neri (red arrow) and its Oratory (blue arrow) in their original context in the map of Rome of Giambattista Nolli (1748)

The church is located in Rome's Regola rione, about halfway down Via Giulia (at the n. 134B), its facade facing west-southwest, in a neighborhood still devastated by the demolitions started in 1938 for the construction of a road between ponte Mazzini bridge and Corso Vittorio Emanuele, never built because of the war.

== Denominations ==
The church, originally dedicated to Saint Trophimus, was then dedicated to Philip Neri and, because of its tiny area, nicknamed by the Roman populace San Filippino ('Little Saint Philip').

== History ==
The church was erected in 1623 (or, according to another source, in 1603) along via Giulia. The building's client was Rutilio Brandi, a Tuscan glove maker native of San Gimignano. Brandi was penitente of Philip Neri and Governatore of the Compagnia delle Santissime Piaghe di Gesù ("Company of the most holy wounds of Jesus"), an institute founded in 1617 and whose members were Florentines living in Rome. Since he was ill with gout, Brandi had the church dedicated to Saint Trophimus, the protector of those with gout. Moreover, in the building which embeds the church Brandi founded two charitable works: a little hospital for priests, and an institute for poor girls, dedicated to Philip Neri. Because of that, the shrine's dedication changed with time to San Filippo Neri, the "apostle of Rome".

In 1728 the church was restored by Filippo Raguzzini on behalf of Pope Benedict XIII (r. 1724-1730); the main work was the new facade, erected between May and October 1728 with a total expense of 500 scudi. The church facade was demolished again and rebuilt between 1767 and 1768 according to a project of Giovanni Francesco Fiori, in an eclectic style between Baroque and Neoclassic.

In 1797, when the French because of the treaty of Tolentino pretended a large amount of money from the Pope, San Filippo was the only church in Rome to keep its silver reliquary, since the rector of the church refused to give it to Pius VI (r. 1775-1799).

Since it is only about 100 metres from the Tiber, the church was severely damaged during a flood in 1853, and due to that was restored under Pope Pius IX (r. 1846-1878) in the same year.

As part of the demolition works ordered by Benito Mussolini in 1938 for the construction of a wide avenue between Ponte Mazzini and the Chiesa Nuova, almost all the buildings around the church were demolished, and the church itself, desecrated, was spared only because of the project stop due to the beginning of WWII. After that, the works of art disappeared into hitherto unknown hands or are completely lost. The building then fell into disrepair: it served as a wood storage and as a deposit for the fruit and vegetables street market of nearby vicolo della Moretta. In the 1960s all the windows were smashed, the façade deteriorated and the portal was walled up; this condition lasted several decades. In 2000, the year of the Jubilee, the church was restored, but it remains deconsecrated and is not accessible.

== Description ==
=== Architecture ===
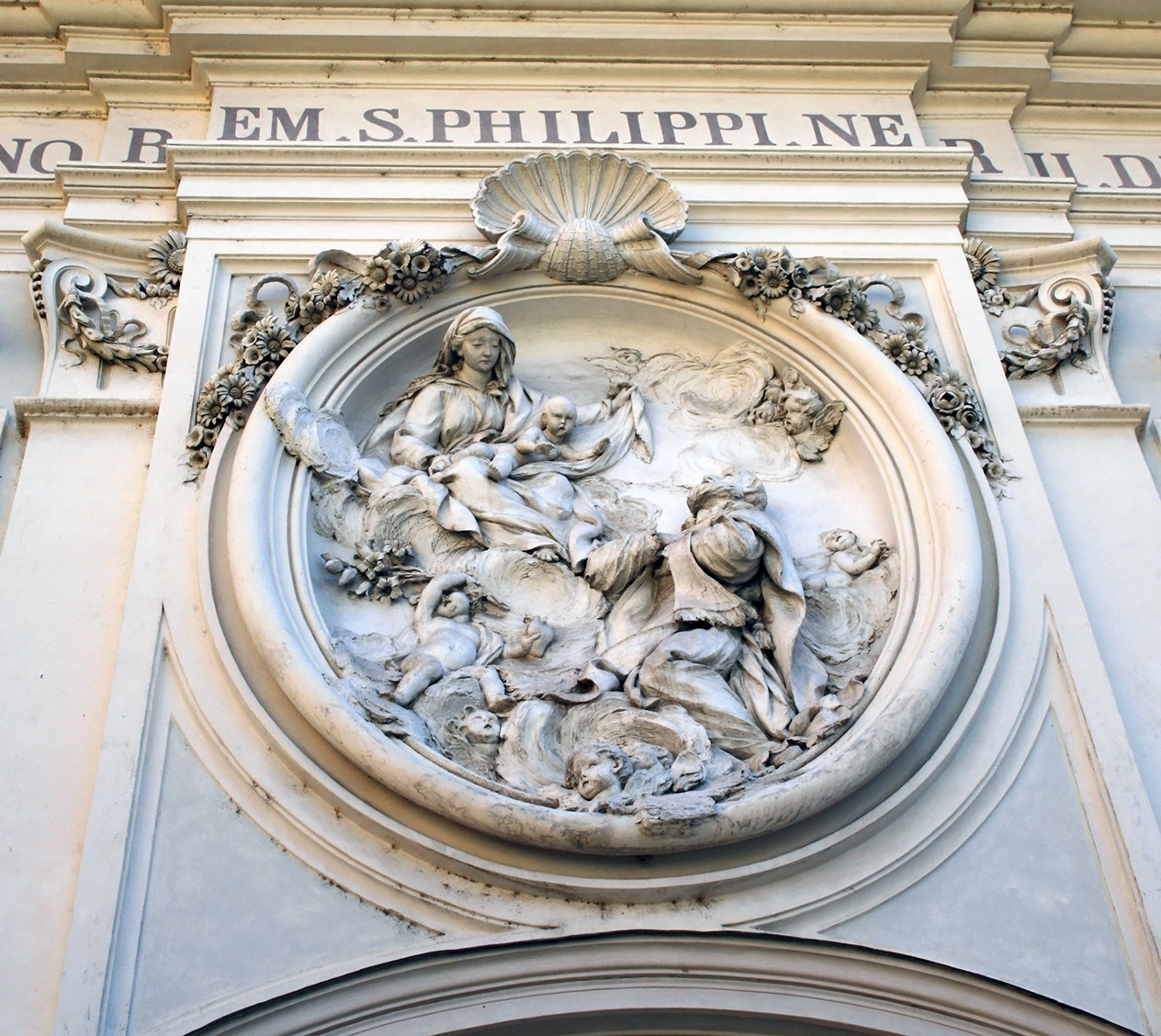
The stucco medallion on the facade

The facade of Fiori is a three-axis and two-storey construction. The three axes are formed by giant order lesenes of a variant of the ionic order. Between the volutes of the capitals are festoons. The portal is vaulted by a continuous segmented arch tympanum, the bays of the side axes are simply segmented. On the first floor, the central axis juts out similarly to an avant-corps, and the element thus created contains a high-oval stucco medallion representing Saint Philip welcomed into heaven by the Madonna and Child, with a glory of cherubs, sided by windows decorated by stucco figures. The side windows are surmounted by protruding segmented arched tympani.

The architrave protruding above the architectonic elements is adorned with the dedication inscription DEO.IN.HONOREM.S.PHILIPPI.NERII.DICATUM. Above it, there is a triangular protruding tympanum in a cartouche (from which garlands run down on both sides) containing the coat of arms of the compagnia.

On the facade facing Via Giulia, on the building is embedded a marble property table with the motto of the compagnia: Plagis plaga curatur ("The plagues of the soul are cured with the calamities").

=== Interior ===
The interior dimensions of the small church are 14 meters in length and 8.40 meters in width. The interior of the building has a single nave and three bays. A peculiarity is that the central axis is not, as expected, at right angles to the façade, but bends about 20 degrees to the south, which is due to the difficult spatial conditions at the time of construction. There are three very narrow chapels on each side. The vaulting consists of transverse and staggered barrel vaults, which thus decrease in height towards the choir room. The transversal arches between the barrels are supported by pilasters of Tuscan order.

The church had three altars: the side altars were consecrated by Pope Benedict XIII in 1728. The right was adorned with a medieval relief originally in the Vatican grotto representing the crucifixion, while the left one was surmounted by a painting by Filippo Zucchetti representing Saint Trophimus healing those with gout. On the main altar lay originally a copy of a painting by Guido Reni representing Saint Philip (the original is at the Chiesa Nuova). In 1853 this was substituted with a painting by Albert Christoph Dies from a drawing by Tommaso Minardi representing Saint Philip brought to the Heaven by the angels.

== Oratory ==
Along the nearby vicolo del malpasso, adjoining the north side of the church, lay the small oratory – now demolished – of the Compagnia delle Santissime Piaghe di Gesù, which was also in a dilapidated state. It hosted a painting attributed to Federico Zuccari, with subject Christ on the mount of Olives.

== Sources ==
- Mariano Armellini (1891). Le chiese di Roma dal secolo IV al XIX (in Italian).
- Pietrangeli, Carlo (1979). Guide rionali di Roma (in Italian). Vol. Regola (III) (2 ed.). Roma: Fratelli Palombi Editori.
- Walter Buchowiecki (1967). Handbuch der Kirchen Roms (in German). Vol. 1. Wien: Verlag Brüder Hollinek.
- Sergio Delli (1988). Le strade di Roma (in Italian). Roma: Newton & Compton.
- Mazzotta, Bartolomeo (2014). AA. VV. (ed.). Dall'archivio Cederna: le chiese distrutte a Roma durante il ventennio fascista (1922-1943) (in Italian). Roma: Gangemi. ISBN 978-88-492-2958-5.
