= San Filippo Neri, Camerino =

Catholic church in Italy

Coordinates: 43.13457°N 13.06479°E

San Filippo Neri is a Baroque style Roman Catholic church in Camerino, in the province of Macerata, region of Marche, Italy.

The church was commissioned by the Oratorians and erected in 1733 by the architects Pietro Loni and Domenico Cipriani. The oval interior layout has three chapels. The second chapel to the right of the main altar once housed a Madonna in Glory with St Phillip (circa 1740), by Giovanni Battista Tiepolo, now move to Diocesan Museum. The church also houses a Crucifixion (1454) and Annunciation by Girolamo di Giovanni.
