= San Filippo Neri, Castelfranco Piandiscò =

Church building in Castelfranco di Sopra, Italy

Coordinates: 43.6209°N 11.5537°E

San Filippo Neri is a baroque-style, Roman Catholic church located in the frazione of Castelfranco di Sopra of the town of Castelfranco Piandiscò, in the Valdarno of the region of Tuscany, Italy.

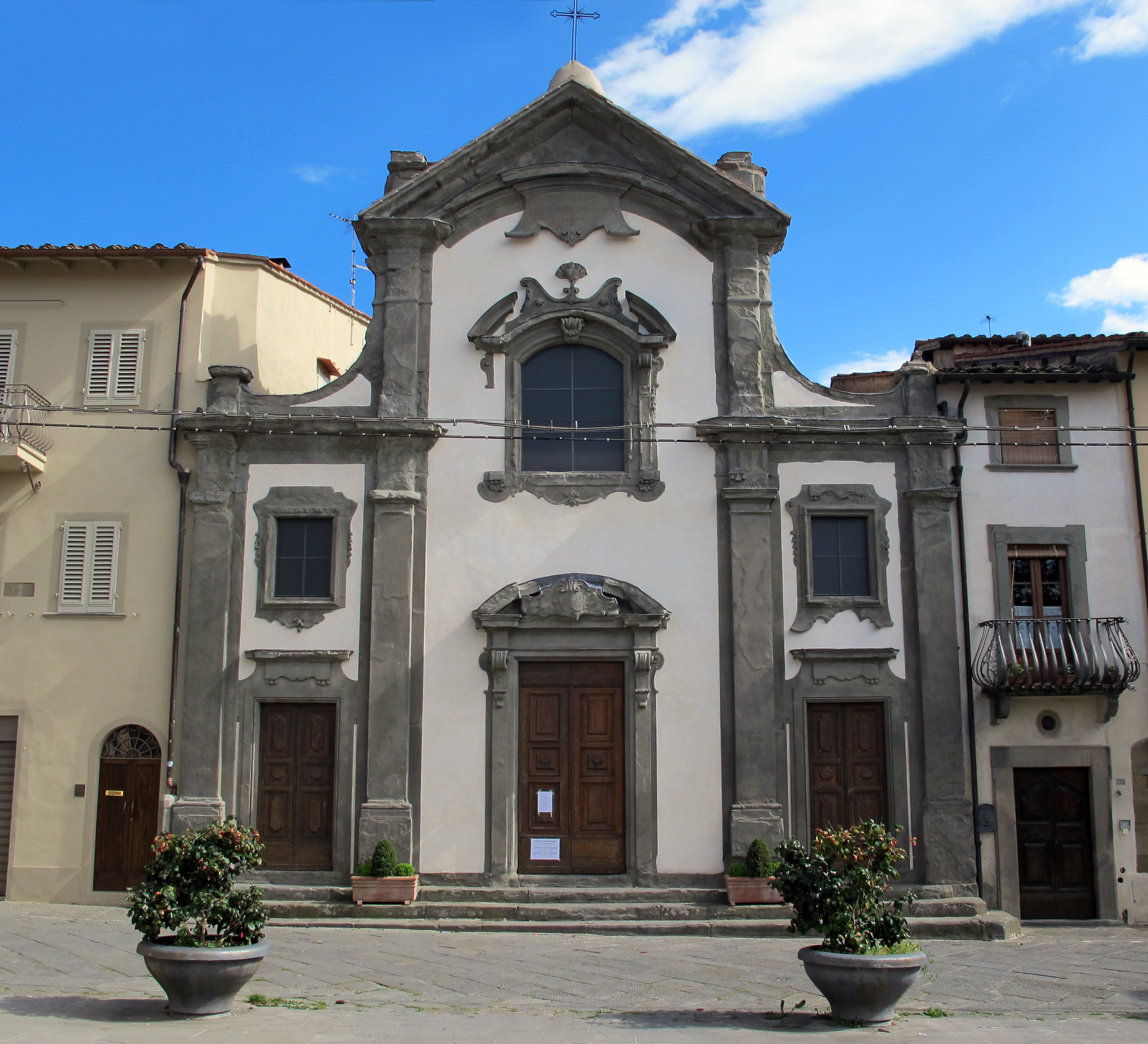
Facade

== History ==
This church was erected in 1631. It was later enlarged to add two naves to the side. The facade pilasters, frames, and roofline were made of pietra serena, a grey local sandstone. The weathering of the elements creates an illusion of melted stone. While baroque in epoch, the asymmetries caused by the weathering, and the stylized frames align the church with mannerist design prevalent in Tuscany.

The interior houses works by the studio of Andrea del Sarto. The ceiling is frescoed by Matteo Rosselli, who painted an Ecstasy of Phillip Neri.The titular saint spent time in the area as a child, and he was adopted as patron of the town.
