= San Filippo Neri, Ragusa =

Italian church

Coordinates: 36°55′32″N 14°44′09″E

San Filippo Neri is a Baroque-style, Roman Catholic church located in the city of Ragusa, in southern Sicily, Italy.

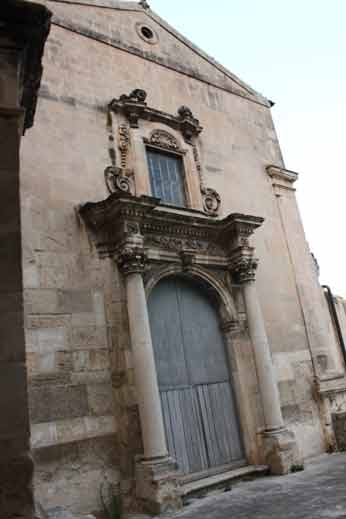
San Filippo Neri façade.

== History ==
A church was erected here in 1636 (390 years ago) and dedicated to Phillip Neri, the newly canonized founder of the Oratorian order, and patronized by the Schininà family. It survived the 1693 earthquake, and was enlarged between 1738 and 1740, and again remodeled in 1761. The interiors were refurbished in the 19th century. The lateral chapel has a canvas depicting Mary at the Temple from the 17th century in an altar with scagliola.
