= St. Philip's Episcopal Church (Circleville, Ohio) =

Historic church in Ohio, United States

- Saint Philip's Episcopal Church
- U.S. National Register of Historic Places
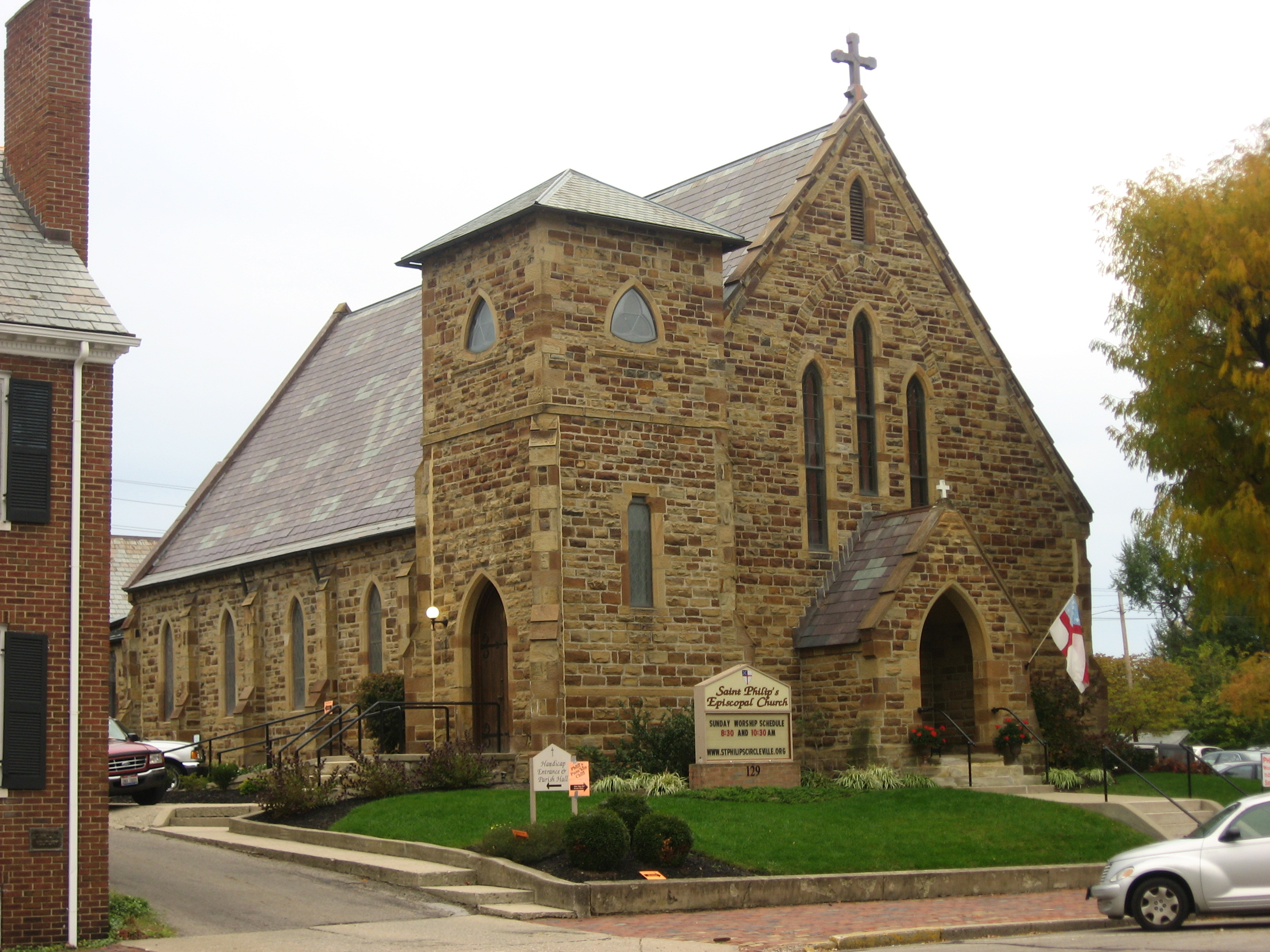
- Front of the church

- Location within Ohio Location within the United States
- Location: 129 W. Mound St. Circleville, Ohio
- Coordinates: 39°35′59″N 82°56′50″W
- Built: 1866
- Architect: William Tinsley
- Architectural style: Gothic, Tudor Revival
- NRHP reference No.: 86001064
- Added to NRHP: May 15, 1986

St. Philip's Episcopal Church is an historic Episcopal church located at 129 West Mound Street in Circleville, Ohio. St. Philip's is a parish in the Episcopal Diocese of Southern Ohio. The Rev. Canon David E. Getreu is the 43rd rector.

In 2019, the church reported 118 members; in 2023, it reported 129 members. Plate and pledge financial support reported by the church in 2023 was $129,001. Average Sunday Attendance (ASA) reported in 2024 was 59 persons. This was a relative decrease on ASA of 65 in 2016.

== History ==
The first Episcopal service in Circleville was held on May 26, 1817, by the Rev. Philander Chase, who in 1819 became the first bishop of the Episcopal Diocese of Ohio. The stone church building was built in 1866 in a mixed Gothic and Tudor Revival style and was consecrated in 1868. Besides its actual name, the church has been known as the "Little Church on the Mound," because it sits on the base of what was formerly one of Circleville's numerous Native American mounds that was historically known as "Mount Gilboa."

In 1918, the church was modified by the construction of a Tudor Revival structure that has since been used as a parish hall. Despite this addition, the church's historic integrity was not damaged, as both its Gothic Revival style and the addition's Tudor Revival style are meant to resemble older English structures. In recognition of its well-preserved historic architecture, St. Philip's was listed on the National Register of Historic Places in 1986.
