= Percent for art =

Percent for art is a policy that requires a share of the cost of development or construction projects, usually around one percent, to be spent on commissioning and installing public art in or around the new buildings. The details vary between programs: they may take the form of municipal ordinances or national guidelines, and may apply to public buildings and infrastructure.

Such programs exist in several European countries, including France, Germany, Finland and Ireland, as well as in many US states and cities and at the US federal level. Similar schemes also exist in Canada and Australia.

== History ==
=== Europe ===
In 1965, the government of Czechoslovakia adopted a resolution which ordered that 1–4% of the budget of the entire building be dedicated to its artistic beautification in the form of permanent placement of works of art. Buildings with a lower budget had to set aside up to 4.2% for art; buildings with a budget over 200,000 Czechoslovak crowns only 0.6%. However, this figure was not fixed – the overall calculation of how much to allocate to art was subject to a more complex calculation that considered, for example, coefficients of social importance or the architectural complexity of the building. From 1972 to 1989, this system secured over 16,500 works placed in architecture.

In Finland, the percent for art principle was first introduced as an official government policy in connection with the construction of the Parliament building in the early 1930s, though it was not implemented until 1939. In 1956 the government extended the principle to all public buildings, and during the 1960s individual municipalities also drew up their own schemes. In 1981 the Association of Finnish Local and Regional Authorities, an advocate for all Finnish municipalities and regions, recommended extending the principle to all aspects of the urban environment. In 1991 the City of Helsinki became the first city to adopt the policy for all building projects, which increased provision of urban art, including in suburban areas. In 2015 the Finnish Ministry of Education and Culture funded a handbook for commissioners of public artworks under the title "The Handbook of the Percent For Art Principle in Finland", which is also published in English.

In France, the 1% artistique ("1% for art") has required since 1951 that one percent of the cost of public construction be allocated to commissioning a work of art. The procedure, now governed by decree no. 2002-677 of 29 April 2002, applies to the State, its public establishments and local authorities. Since 1951 it has funded more than 12,400 projects involving more than 4,000 artists.

Germany has guidelines for "Kunst am Bau" (art on buildings) which oblige the federal government, as the building owner, to spend a share of construction costs – originally at least one percent, later two percent – on works of art, where the purpose and significance of the project justify it. The obligation dates back to a resolution passed by the Bundestag on 25 January 1950; the rules later became section K 7 of the RBBau building regulations and were subsequently adopted for public buildings by states and municipalities.

In Ireland, one percent of the cost of all public works can be allocated to commissioning a work of art. The scheme was introduced in 1978, and extended to all government departments in 1997. Percent for Art is also promoted for construction and infrastructure projects in Northern Ireland.

=== United States ===
From 1934 to 1943, the Section of Painting and Sculpture in the United States Department of the Treasury followed a policy requiring one percent of the cost of federal buildings to be applied toward art and decoration. In 1959, Philadelphia adopted the first such municipal ordinance in the United States. Other jurisdictions followed suit, including Baltimore in 1964, San Francisco and Hawaii in 1967, and Seattle in 1973.

By 1984 there were more than 200 such ordinances across the country. According to the National Assembly of State Arts Agencies, percent-for-art programs are active in 27 states and territories. At the federal level, the General Services Administration established the Art in Architecture Program in the early 1960s, which reserves 0.5% of the estimated construction cost of each new federal building or modernization for an art commission; the program was cancelled in 1966 and re-established in 1973.

=== Canada and Australia ===
In Toronto, the Percent for Public Art Program secures public-art contributions from private-sector developments through the planning process: the Official Plan encourages public art in all significant private developments, and the artwork must be clearly visible from publicly accessible areas. Developers may commission work on site or pay into a Public Art Reserve Fund for city-commissioned works elsewhere. In Western Australia, the state government's Percent for Art Scheme, started in 1989, requires up to one percent of the construction budget for new public works over $2 million, such as schools, police stations and hospitals, to be spent on commissioned artwork.

== Debate ==
A 1982 survey of percentage-for-art schemes in Western countries noted recurring criticisms: over-involvement of architects in artist selection, nepotism, complex bureaucratic procedures causing delays, erosion of fixed allocations by inflation, vandalism of installed works, and unresolved questions over future maintenance and copyright ownership.

== See also ==
- Arts council
