= Brubaker/Brandt =

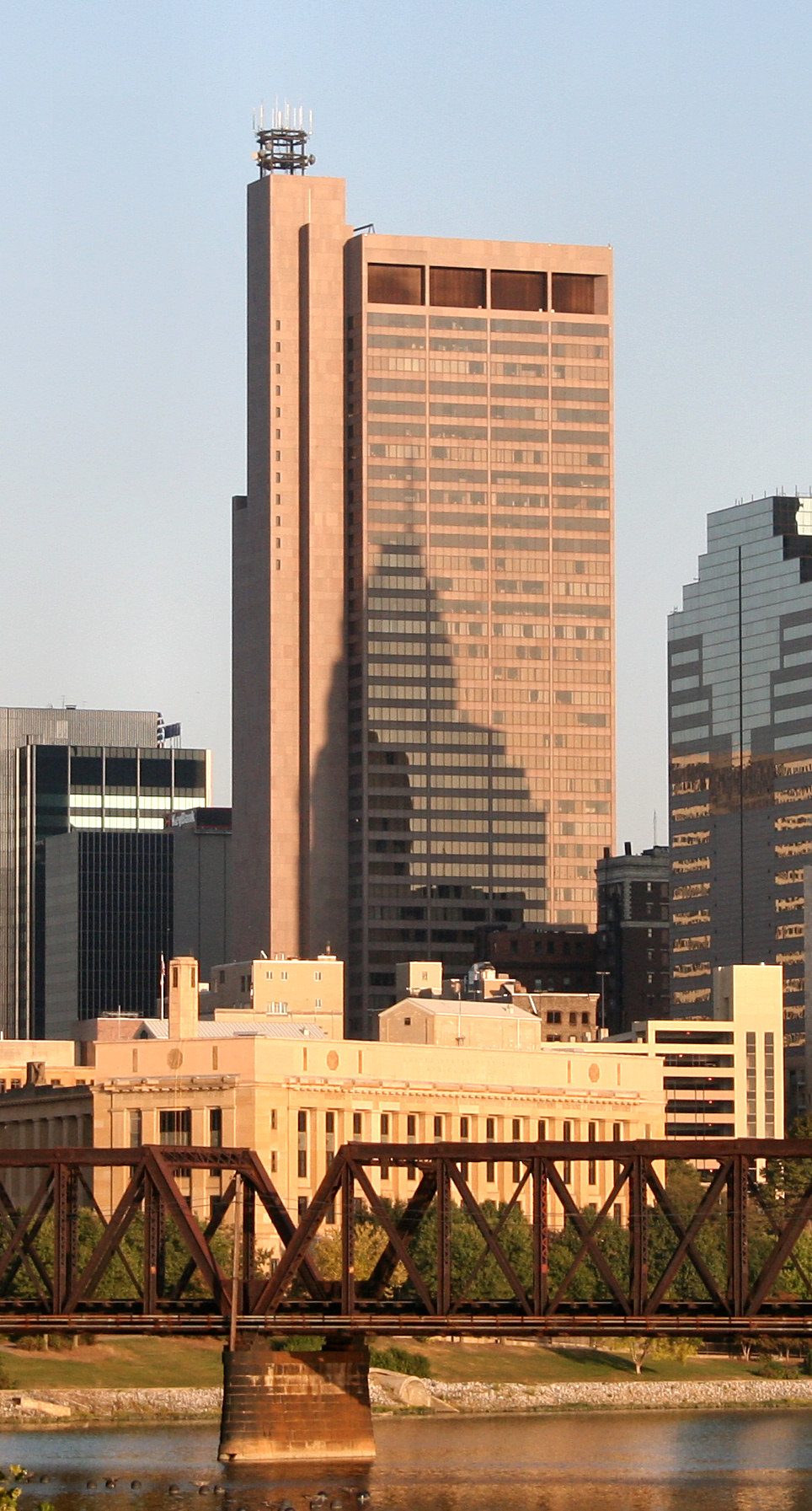
The Rhodes State Office Tower in Columbus, Ohio

Brubaker/Brandt was an architecture firm based in Columbus, Ohio. The firm completed some of the tallest buildings affecting the city's skyline including the 42-story Rhodes State Office Tower and the Continental Center, along with other notable buildings throughout the Columbus area.

== History ==
The architectural firm Brubaker/Brandt was founded by Leland F. Brubaker (1924–2011) and Kent Brandt (1927–2010). Brubaker and Brandt both attended the Ohio State University and graduated with a degree in architecture in 1949 and 1951, respectively, after serving in the military. The firm employed architects, interior designers, and planners.

=== Work ===
In 1971, Motorists Mutual Insurance Group hired Brubaker/Brandt to begin feasibility studies on expansion or relocation to the suburbs. The firm found that while residents were moving to the suburbs businesses were staying in downtown but were shifting from High Street to Broad Street, catalyzing their decision to remain in the business center. The building designed by the firm met the insurance company's long term needs for growth and attract new businesses to the area while providing conference facilities, parking, and dining for employees. Ground was broken in May 1971, and completed in 1973. The 21-story tower's (now the Encova Building) facade uses bronze-tinted solar glass and one of the first buildings in Columbus to use non-asbestos fireproofing and handicap accessibility.

Designed by Brubaker/Brandt and completed in 1975, the James A. Rhodes State Office Tower contrasts with the nearby Ohio Statehouse through its vertical orientation and red granite facade. The Ohio Supreme Court's chamber was originally on the second floor and is emphasized in the building's design.

In 1977, Brubaker/Brandt led the planning, design and construction of an extensive expansion of the John Glenn Columbus International Airport. The expansion included a 590-car parking garage, largening the terminal from 139,304 square feet to 494,169 square feet, and reconfigured utilities. During construction, the firm worked to minimize interruption for passengers and residents in the surrounding area. The project was completed in 1982 and cost $55 million.

The OCLC headquarters was completed in 1981 in Dublin, Ohio and housed a computer network for library records that freed up time and space at local libraries. The bomb-proof and fire-proof was highly technologically advanced for the time, utilizing electronic key passes and temperature controlled spaces. The building features a large atrium and is reminiscent of the Columbus Hyatt.

On June 5, 1989, Columbus City Council approved Brubaker/Brandt as the architect for city buildings, waiving any competitive bidding process from other firms. They were later awarded the Columbus Division of Police Headquarters project. Designed to be twice as large as the previous building, it was intended to reflect City Hall's design and has a two-story main entrance and a 275-seat auditorium. The Police Headquarters building was completed in 1991, but was plagued by controversy and mechanical problems with elements missing from the architect's drawings The mechanical problems of the building were identified to be caused from change orders during construction, rushing construction for the grand opening, and poor design.

== Notable projects ==
Projects by Brubaker/Brandt included:

- Bricker Federal Building
- Chemical Abstracts Service Headquarters
- Columbus Division of Police Headquarters
- Continental Center
- Encova Building
- James A. Rhodes State Office Tower
- John Glenn Columbus International Airport original expansion
- OCLC Headquarters
- Ohio University Arena and Convocation Center

== See also ==
- Architecture of Columbus, Ohio
