= Continental Center =

Continental Center may refer to:

- Continental Center (Columbus, Ohio)
- Continental Center (New York City)

== See also ==
- 1600 Smith Street, previously named Continental Center I
- Metropolitan Tower (Chicago), previously named Continental Center I
