= Correlation: Two White Line Diagonals and Two Arcs with a Sixteen-Foot Radius =

Public artwork in Columbus, Ohio, U.S.

- Part of the sculpture in 2009
- Artist: Robert Mangold
- Year: 1977–1978
- Location: Columbus, Ohio, United States
- 39°57′59.6″N 83°0′4.9″W

Correlation: Two White Line Diagonals and Two Arcs with a Sixteen-Foot Radius, also known as Correlations, is a 1977–1978 by Robert Mangold, installed on the exterior of the Bricker Federal Building in Downtown Columbus, Ohio, United States.

== Description ==
The abstract artwork features ten orange porcelain enamel panels arranged on the building's facade. Each panel measures approximately 8 ft. x 4 ft. x 2 in. A nearby plaque reads: "Robert Mangold / Correlation: Two White / Line Diagonals And Two / Arcs With A 16 Foot Radius / 1977 / Commissioned Under The / Art-In-Architecture Program / General Services Administration / United States Of America."

== History ==
Correlation cost $70,000 and was commissioned by the General Services Administration's Art-in-Architecture Program. The artwork was surveyed by the Smithsonian Institution's "Save Outdoor Sculpture!" program in 1994.
