= To Honor the Immigrants =

Sculpture in Columbus, Ohio, U.S.

- The sculpture in 2018
- Artist: Gary Ross
- Year: 1991–1992
- Medium: Bronze sculpture
- Location: Columbus, Ohio, United States
- 39°57′48.91″N 83°0′20.42″W

To Honor the Immigrants (also known as Immigrants: Strength of Our Nation or simply Immigrants) is an outdoor 1991–1992 bronze sculpture by Gary Ross, installed at Columbus, Ohio's Battelle Riverfront Park, in the United States.

Gary Ross, a longtime Columbus resident, also sculpted Governor James A. Rhodes, a work depicting former Ohio Governor Jim Rhodes, today situated in front of the Rhodes State Office Tower.

== Description and history ==
The artwork depicts an immigrant couple; the man carries a trunk and the woman holds an infant. It measures approximately 7 feet (2.1 m) x 4 feet (1.2 m), 5.75 inches (14.6 cm) x 3 feet (0.91 m), 6.5 inches (17 cm), and rests on a stone base measuring approximately 5 feet (1.5 m) x 64 inches (160 cm) x 4 feet (1.2 m), 4 inches (10 cm). Inscriptions on the base include the artist's name, "To Honor the Immigrants / The Strength of Our Nation / A Gift to the City of Columbus / From / United Italian Americans / For 1992", and a list of names associated with the Columbus Italian Club.

The sculpture was modeled in 1991 and dedicated on May 29, 1992. It was conceived by Mary Lou Casanta, who founded the United Italian Americans (UIA) more than three years before the statue's dedication. 21 organizations affiliated with UIA contributed $70,000 to the project. Ground broke in December 1991, and the work's dedication coincided with the 500th anniversary of Christopher Columbus' landing. It was surveyed by the Smithsonian Institution's "Save Outdoor Sculpture!" program in 1992.

== See also ==
- 1992 in art
