= Encova Building =

Skyscraper in Columbus, Ohio

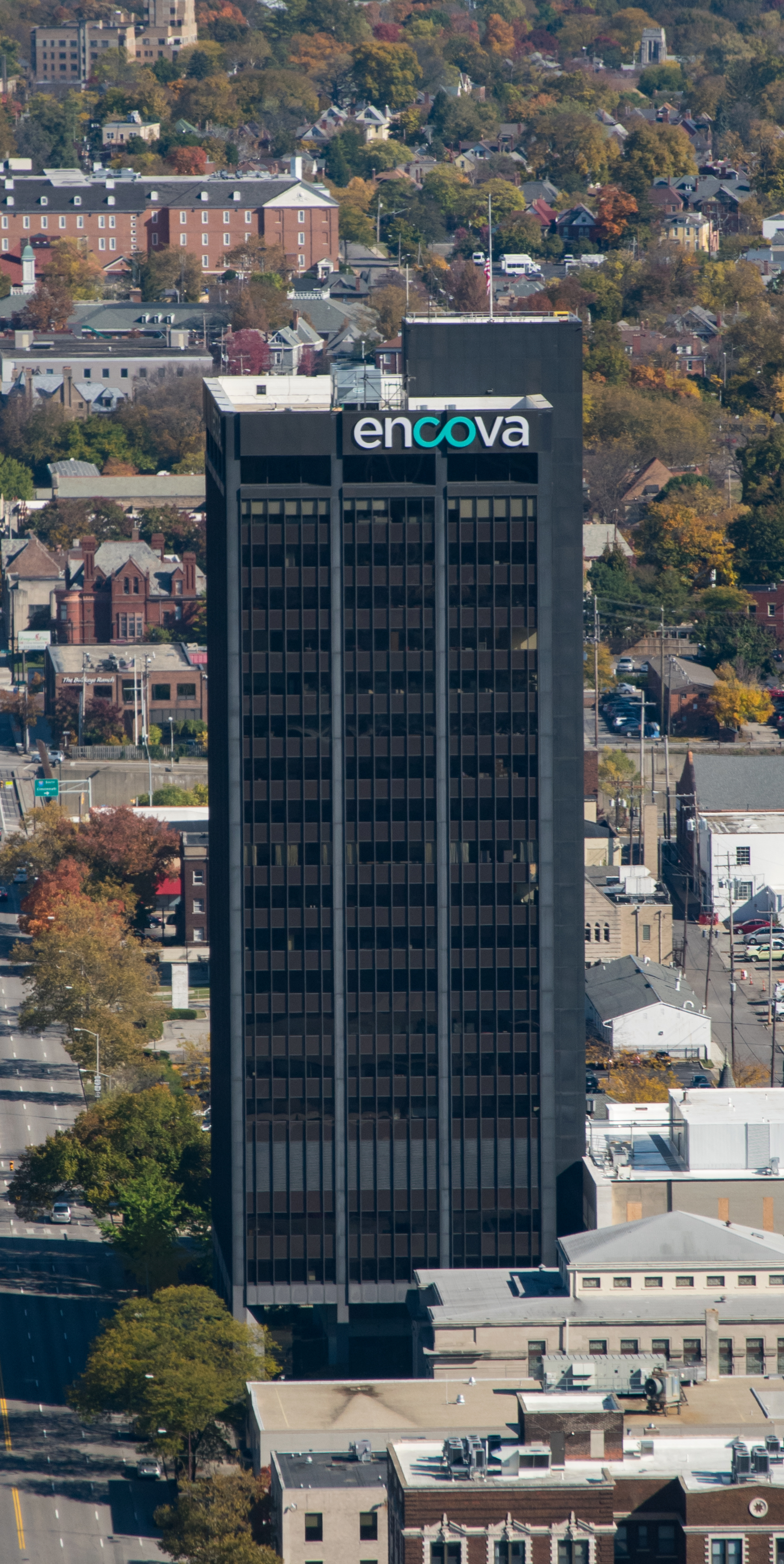
- Interactive map of the Encova Building area

General information
- Type: Office
- Location: 471 East Broad Street, Columbus, Ohio
- Coordinates: 39°57′48″N 82°59′16″W
- Construction started: 1970
- Completed: 1973

Height
- Roof: 286 ft (87 m)

Technical details
- Floor count: 21

Design and construction
- Architect: Maddox NBD inc.

The Encova Building (formerly known as the Motorists Mutual Building) is a 286 ft (87m) tall skyscraper located at 471 East Broad Street Columbus, Ohio. It was completed in 1973 and was designed by Brubaker/Brandt and Maddox NBD. It is the 18th tallest building in Columbus, has 21 floors, and 6 elevators. The building initially served as the headquarters for the Motorists Mutual Insurance Group, a subsidiary of the larger insurance group BrickStreet; in 2019, BrickStreet changed its name to Encova, and as "an effort to integrate all of the company’s operations and names under one brand," the Motorists Mutual Building was renamed to the Encova Building, and its exterior signage changed to match.

The building follows the modern and international architectural styles and has a curtain wall facade system. The building overlooks Topiary Park, located 2 blocks south of the building. The park has a three-dimensional topiary model of the scene in George Seurat's painting Sunday Afternoon on the Island of Grand Jatte. The garden was also sponsored by Motorists Mutual.

== History ==
In 1971, Motorists Mutual Insurance Group hired Brubaker/Brandt to begin feasibility studies on expansion or relocation to the suburbs. The firm found that while residents were moving to the suburbs businesses were staying in downtown but were shifting from High Street to Broad Street, catalyzing their decision to remain in the business center. The building designed by the firm met the insurance company's long term needs for growth and attract new businesses to the area while providing conference facilities, parking, and dining for employees. Ground was broken in May 1971, and completed in 1973. The tower's facade uses bronze-tinted solar glass and one of the first buildings in Columbus to use non-asbestos fireproofing and handicap accessibility.

== See also ==
- List of tallest buildings in Columbus
