= Columbus Division of Police Headquarters =

Building in Columbus, Ohio

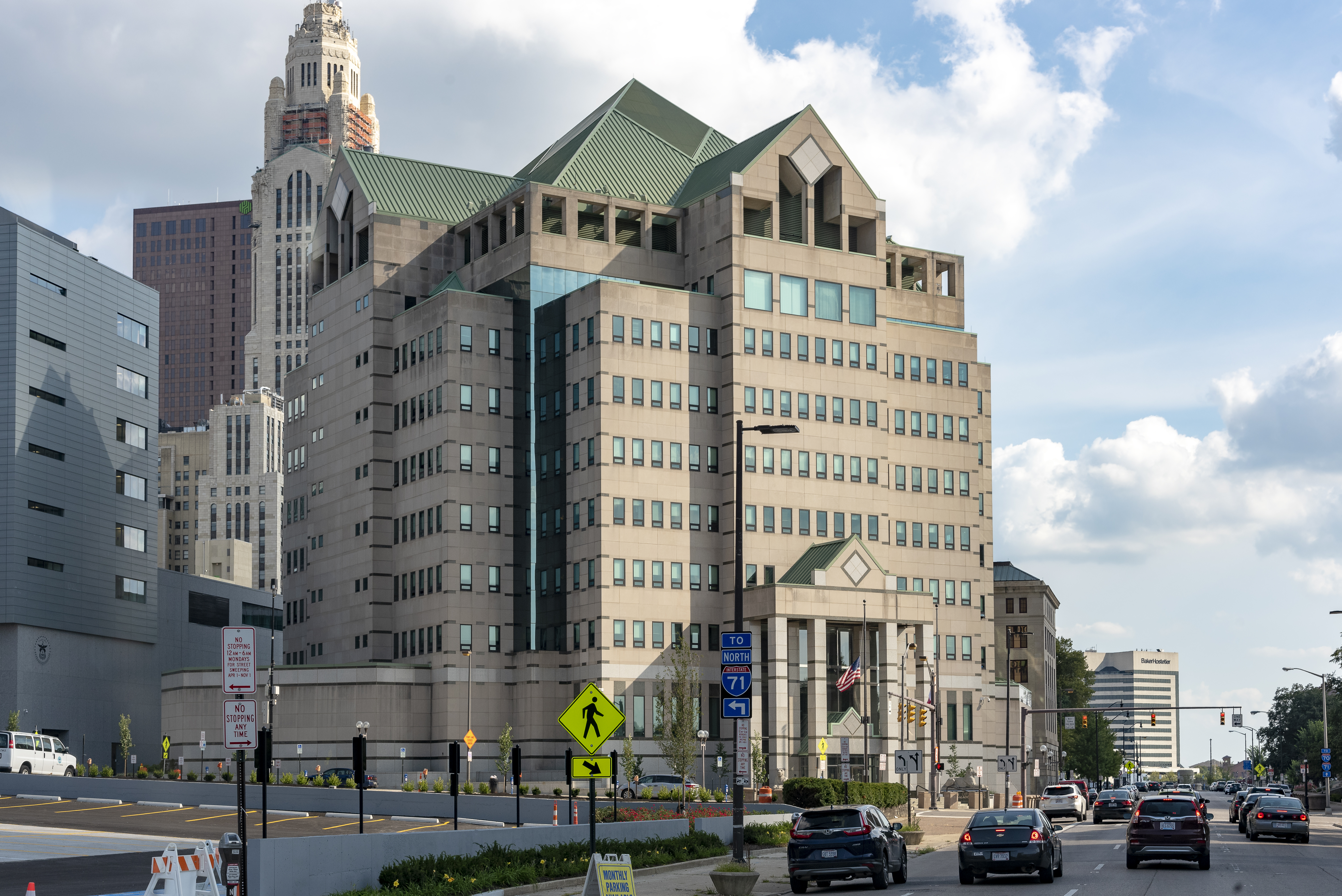
- Main facade facing Marconi Blvd. and Long St.
- Interactive map of the Columbus Division of Police Headquarters area

General information
- Architectural style: Postmodern
- Location: 120 Marconi Boulevard, Columbus, Ohio, United States
- Coordinates: 39.964213°N 83.004114°W
- Groundbreaking: April 3, 1990
- Inaugurated: November 13, 1991
- Cost: $31 million
- Owner: City of Columbus

Technical details
- Floor count: 8

Design and construction
- Architecture firm: Brubaker/Brandt

Other information
- Parking: Municipal garage

The Columbus Division of Police Headquarters is the central office of the Columbus Division of Police, of Columbus, Ohio. The building is located in the city's downtown Civic Center. It is the fifth headquarters for the Columbus police department. The eight-story building was designed by Brubaker/Brandt in the postmodern style, and reflects elements of City Hall's design.

The building was constructed from 1990 to 1991 on the site of former municipal buildings. It replaced the department's Central Police Station, built in 1930. The new headquarters was lauded at its opening, though it was built over-budget, it had seen issues before opening, and was plagued with problems during its operation, especially insulation problems, for the first several decades of its use.

== Attributes ==
The eight-story building was designed by architectural firm Brubaker/Brandt in the postmodern style.

The building was constructed to the immediate north of the department's previous headquarters, and more than doubled the amount of space. It was intended to reflect City Hall's design, including with granite and limestone facades. The interior includes an open two-story lobby with a central information desk, glass display cases, and a small museum area. Also within the building are a cafeteria and a 275-seat auditorium, both open to the public.

== History ==
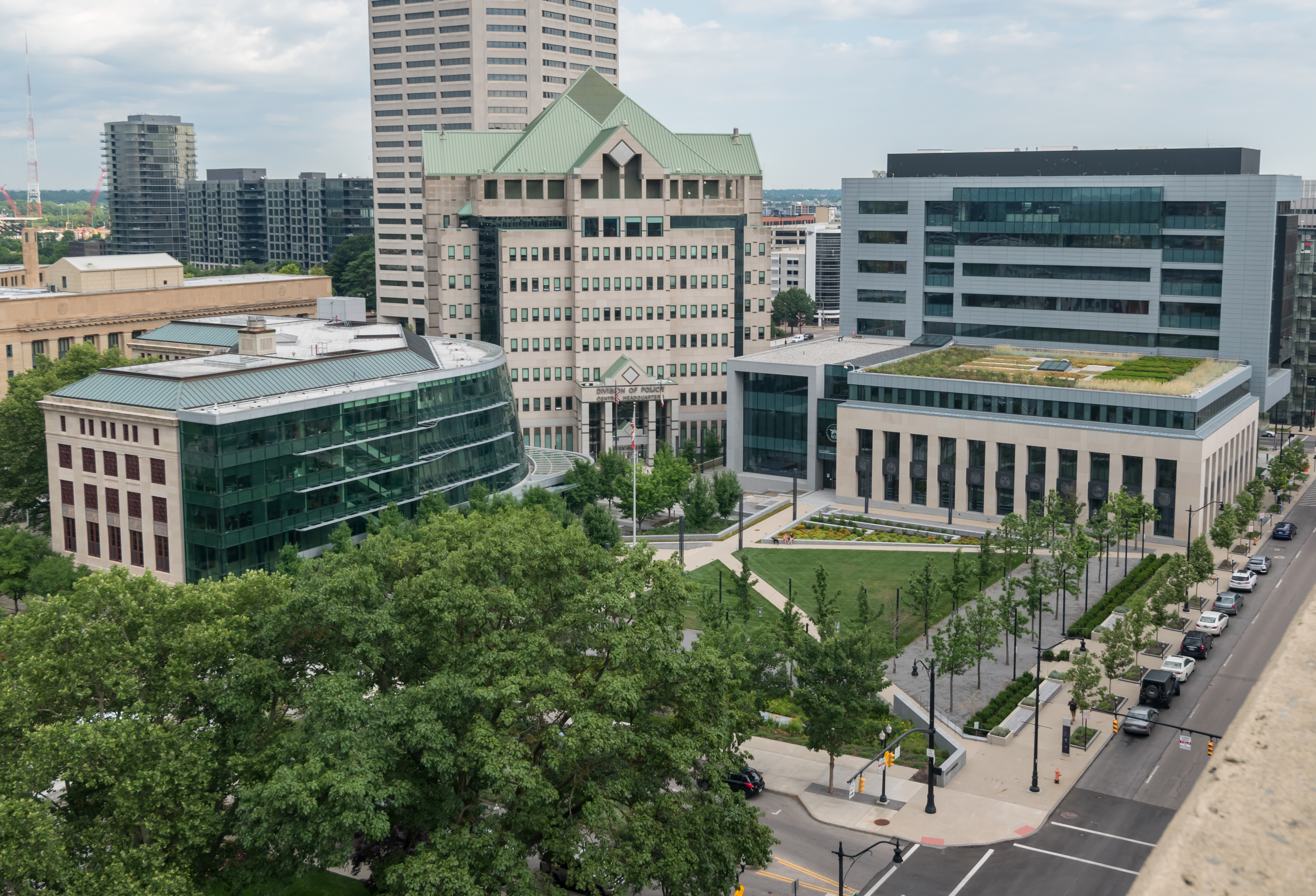
The building (center), among other municipal offices and the City Commons park

Space for the new headquarters was cleared beginning on March 7, 1990. A six-story city office building and police garage on the site were razed by S.G. Loewendick and Sons.

Ground for the new building was broken on April 3, 1990. The former headquarters, 77 North Front Street, were too small and cramped for the department. The new, eight-story building, would increase space from 80,000 square feet to 200,000, and have an estimated cost of $27 million. This was a budget approved by voters in a 1988 bond issue, though by 1990, the department estimated costs of $31 million to fully furnish the building and two separate facilities originally intended to be in the building. Two weeks before its opening, the building began to have a rat problem, with several rat nests and rodents found in and around the building, likely finding the largely-vacant building a warm and dry place to live.

The building was dedicated on November 13, 1991, though public visitations, ceremonies, and tours were delayed to further days. The building was lauded at its opening, including being named by "Access: Franklin County" as the most accessible government building during its 1990 awards. Despite this, the main entrance lacked an accessible entrance, and no signage was posted to direct people to the accessible entrance on a side street until the Columbus Dispatch raised the issue in 1992.

The building was designed by architectural firm Brubaker/Brandt. The firm had been approved by Columbus City Council as the architect for city buildings on June 5, 1989, waiving any competitive bidding process from other firms. They were later awarded the police headquarters project. The Police Headquarters building was completed in 1991, but was plagued by controversy and mechanical problems; the most serious was missing insulation in the architect's drawings, affecting heating and cooling throughout the building. The mechanical problems of the building were identified to be caused from change orders during construction, rushing construction for the grand opening, as well as by poor design.

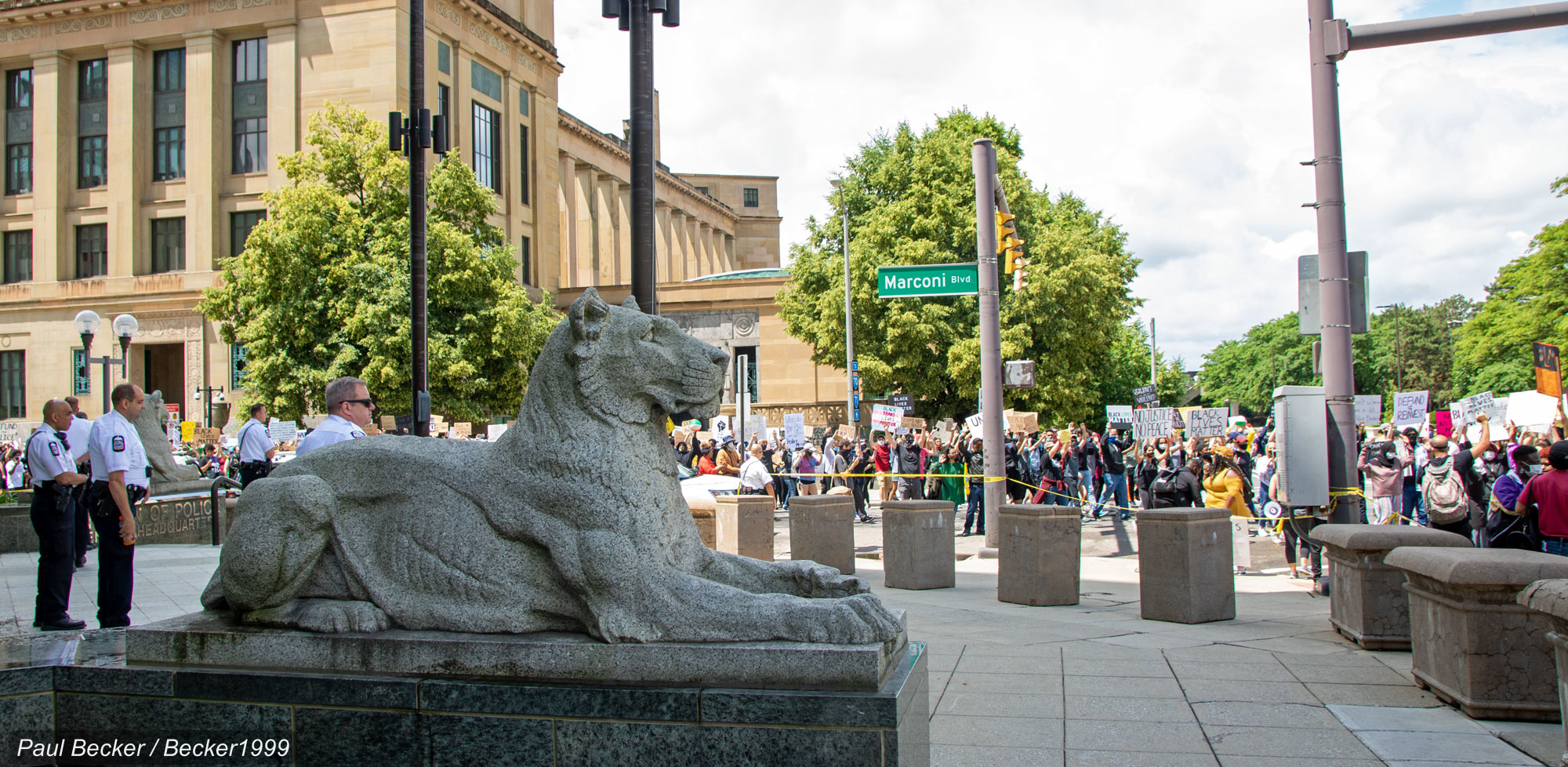
Protesting crowds outside the building during the George Floyd protests in 2020

By 1995, the problems were to have been addressed, though contractors were found to only have insulated parts of the lobby, missing a space between the second and third floors, causing sprinklers to freeze and burst. In 2013, the department again hired contractors to fix insulation problems, including removing all of its exterior walls to install a proper thermal wrap. By this time, the original architects, contractors, and consultants all had been sold or closed.

During the George Floyd protests taking place in the city, several peaceful protests were led outside the building's main entrance in 2020. The protests continued into 2021; one event that year led the police to spray several protesters in the building with mace. Police and protesters disagreed over further details of the conflict.

== Lion sculptures ==
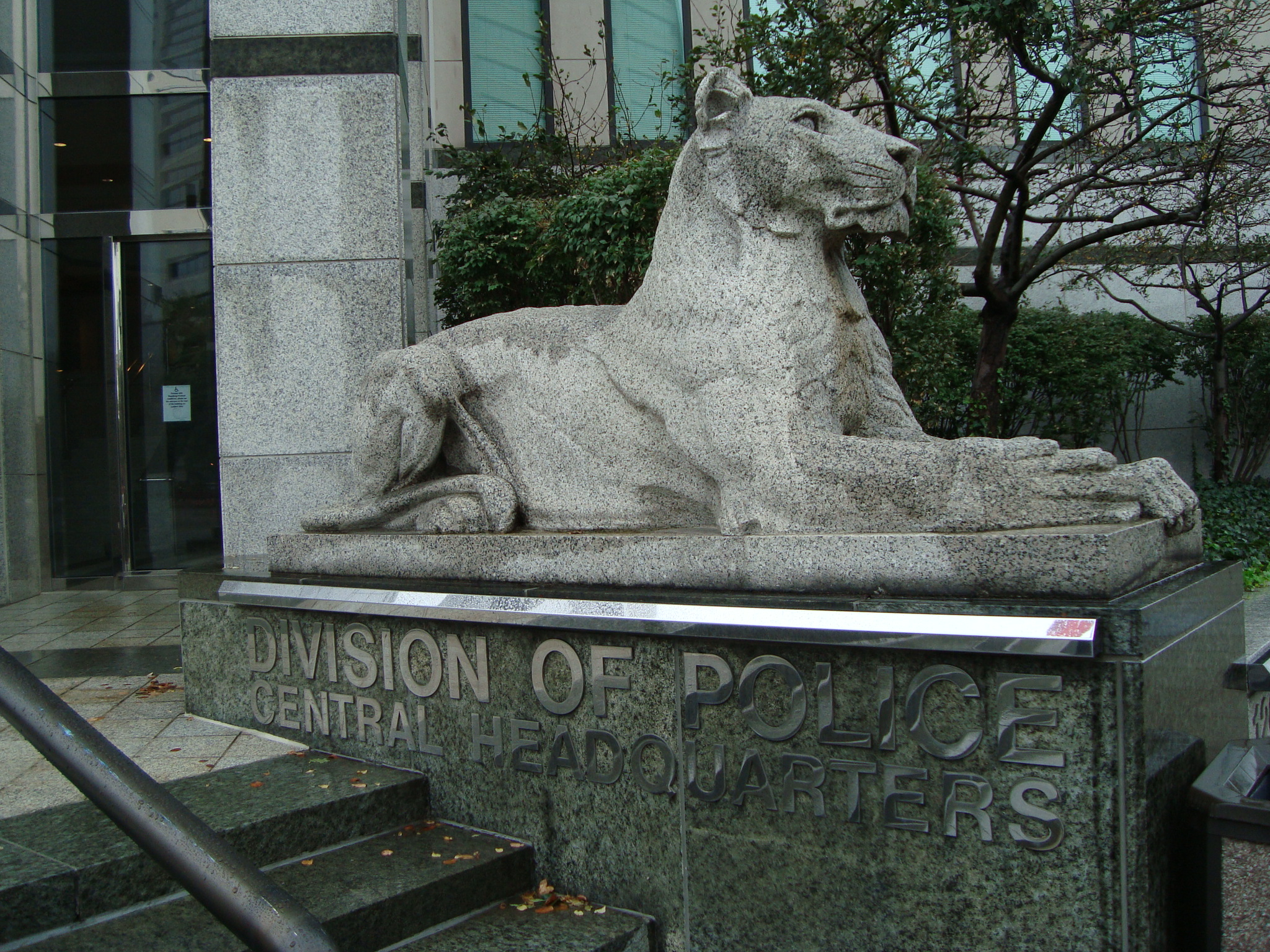
One of the two lion sculptures

The building is decorated with two stone lion sculptures, nicknamed Patience and Perseverance, first installed at the earlier station's front entrance. The 9,000 lb (4,100 kg) lions have been moved three times – in 1991 to the new police headquarters at 120 Marconi Boulevard, in 2012 back to the original building, and in 2017 back to the new headquarters. The first move was prompted by the police offices moving, while the second was part of improving 77 North Front Street during its restoration and expansion. Columbus police were upset with the move, even though the new building was supposed to gain new sculptures. The police union backed the officers, and secured a donation from contractors to move the lion sculptures back to the new headquarters in 2017, where they remain today.

== See also ==
- Government of Columbus, Ohio
