= Bricker Federal Building =

Federal office building in Columbus, Ohio

- Photograph by Carol Highsmith
- Interactive map of the Bricker Federal Building area

General information
- Architectural style: Brutalist
- Location: 200 N. High Street, Columbus, Ohio
- Coordinates: 39.966688°N 83.001001°W
- Completed: 1977

Technical details
- Floor count: 7
- Floor area: 229,242 sq ft (21,297.3 m^{2})

Design and construction
- Architecture firm: Brubaker/Brandt

Other information
- Parking: Connected garage

Website
- www.gsa.gov/brickerfb

The John W. Bricker Federal Building is a federal office building in Downtown Columbus, Ohio. The structure was designed in the Brutalist architecture style and was built in 1977 to house federal offices. It has seven stories, and is part of a 454,000 sq ft (42,200 m^{2}) facility, including an eight-story parking garage.

The building is named for John W. Bricker, an Ohio governor and U.S. senator who lived in Columbus.

== Attributes ==
The John W. Bricker Federal Building has offices for U.S. Senator Sherrod Brown as well as for the Internal Revenue Service, the Social Security Administration, and the Departments of Housing & Urban Development and Agriculture. It also has a USPS post office and a cafeteria.

The building's exterior features Correlation: Two White Line Diagonals and Two Arcs with a Sixteen-Foot Radius, a work by Robert Mangold, made of porcelain-enamel and steel.

== History ==
Architects Brubaker/Brandt began designing the seven-story building and attached parking garage in 1974. It was designed with walkways on the second floor that were intended to eventually connect to the Greater Columbus Convention Center as part of the city's pedestrian movement plan. The building was completed in 1977. Following its completion, the former federal office (the U.S. Post Office and Courthouse) was vacated.

In the 1980s, U.S. Senator John Glenn and Representatives John Kasich and Chalmers P. Wylie had their offices in the building, along with branch offices of the IRS and Social Security Administration.

In 1988, a bill passed naming the building for John W. Bricker, an Ohio governor and U.S. senator from Columbus. A similar bill passed the U.S. House in 1986 but failed to pass the Senate.

In 2011, the USPS considered closing its small post office in the building, as part of a nationwide closure for small post offices.

The Bankruptcy Court and U.S. Marshals Service in Columbus announced in December 2020 that they were moving from leased space into the building. The relocation was expected to occur by mid 2026 when construction was completed. In 2025, the GSA released a list of federal office buildings slated for disposal. The Bricker Federal Building along with the attached parking garage was placed on the list pending disposal.
