= Janet E. Jackson =

American judge

Janet E. Jackson is a former American judge, United Way of Central Ohio president, and Columbus Civilian Police Review Board chair.

== Education ==
Jackson graduated from Wittenberg University and George Washington University Law School.

== Career ==
Jackson was the first woman to serve as Franklin County Municipal Court judge and the first woman and first African-American as Columbus city attorney. She was president of United Way of Central Ohio. She chaired the Columbus Civilian Police Review Board.
