= Continental Center (Columbus, Ohio) =

Skyscraper in Columbus, Ohio

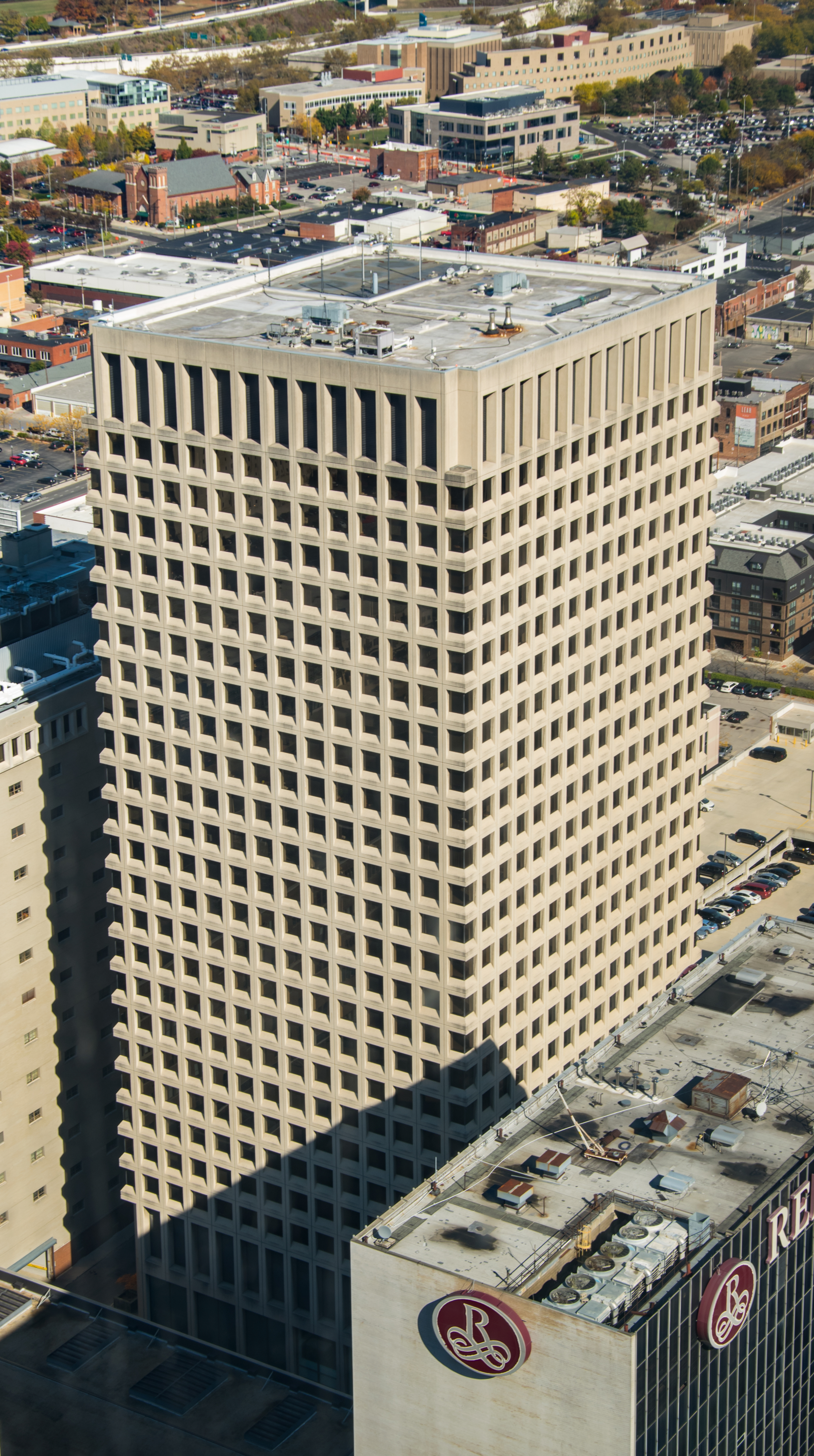
- View from Rhodes State Office Tower
- Interactive map of the Continental Center area

General information
- Type: Office
- Location: 150 East Gay Street, Columbus, Ohio
- Coordinates: 39.964445°N 82.997136°W
- Completed: 1973

Height
- Roof: 348 ft (106 m)

Technical details
- Floor count: 26
- Floor area: 479,995 sq ft (44,593.0 m^{2})

Design and construction
- Architect: Brubaker/Brandt

U.S. National Register of Historic Places
- Designated: December 20, 2021
- Reference no.: 100007231

Continental Center is a 26-story, 348 ft (106 m) skyscraper in Downtown Columbus, Ohio. It is the 14th tallest building in Columbus. It was completed in 1973 and designed by architectural firm Brubaker/Brandt. The building follows a modernist architectural style and has been known as the Ohio Bell Building and the Ameritech Building. The building was added to the National Register of Historic Places in 2021.

== History ==
Designed by Brubaker/Brandt for the Ohio Bell Telephone Company, the building was constructed from 1970 to 1973, with an approximate cost of $20 million.

The building was sold in 2021 for $12 million. In 2022, the new owners began making plans to convert its office spaces into 330 apartment units.

== See also ==
- List of tallest buildings in Columbus, Ohio
- National Register of Historic Places listings in Columbus, Ohio
