= Statue of Jim Rhodes =

Statue in Columbus, Ohio, U.S.

Governor James A. Rhodes
- Artist: Gary Ross
- Year: 1982
- Medium: Bronze statue
- Subject: Jim Rhodes
- Dimensions: 2.0 m (6.5 ft)
- Location: East Broad Street, Columbus, Ohio, United States; 39°57′45.4″N 82°59′56.9″W

Governor James A. Rhodes is a 1982 bronze statue depicting Ohio governor Jim Rhodes by Gary Ross, installed along East Broad Street in front of the Rhodes State Office Tower in Columbus, Ohio, United States.

== Description ==
The work is 12 feet (3.7 m) tall and almost 6 tons in weight, including a 6.5-foot (2.0 m) bronze statue weighing 700 lbs. and a granite base weighing more than 11,000 lbs. The granite is from New Hampshire, and is similar in color to the granite used in the Rhodes State Office Tower. The bronze portion is hollow, with metal a quarter-inch thick. The figure is welded to a four-inch plinth, which is bolted to the pedestal, increasing the work's stability over traditional securement methods.

The work depicts James A. Rhodes (the longest-serving governor of Ohio and the namesake for the Rhodes State Office Tower) as he looked in 1963. The statue sits on a small plaza outside the Rhodes Tower, facing East Broad Street. The statue depicts Rhodes wearing a business suit, striding forward, and carrying a briefcase in his right hand. The appearance was described in 1982 as a "Rhodes trademark", used in his campaign literature since 1962, and seen in photographs published in news media.

The work was sculpted by longtime Columbus resident Gary Ross, who also sculpted To Honor the Immigrants, located in Battelle Riverfront Park.

An inscription on the base reads:

JAMES A. RHODES / HE SERVED AS GOVERNOR / FOR 16 YEARS–– / LONGER THAN ANY OTHER / STATE GOVERNOR IN THE / HISTORY OF THE UNION / GOVERNOR OF THE STATE OF OHIO / 1975–1983 / 1962–1971 / AUDITOR OF THE STATE OF OHIO / 1953–1963 / MAYOR OF THE CITY OF COLUMBUS / 1944–1953 / AUDITOR OF THE CITY OF COLUMBUS / 1940–1944 / MEMBER OF THE COLUMBUS BOARD / OF EDUCATION / 1938–1940 / DEDICATED: DECEMBER 5, 1982.

Plaster castings of the statue are stored by the Ohio History Connection, the organization authorized by the state assembly to oversee the project.

After Rhodes' death in 2001, the statue's manufacturer, Studio Foundry, revealed that the inside of the statue has a hidden engraved message, a tribute to the four students killed at Kent State University during the Kent State shootings in 1970. As governor, Rhodes had ordered the Ohio National Guard to the university to face the student protests.

== History ==
The statue cost $67,500 and was commissioned by several companies, including the American Financial Corporation, Dale Property Company, L. M. Berry and Company, and the Western-Southern Life Insurance Company. The work was created after artist Gary Ross held a one two-hour sitting with Jim Rhodes and created a clay model. The bronze work was manufactured by Studio Foundry in Downtown Cleveland, created in seven parts, welded together, with the welds chased out to create a seamless piece.

Dedicated on December 5, 1982, it was originally installed on the northeast corner of the Ohio Statehouse grounds. The statue was hit by a car and vandalized in 1983. It was moved by crane to its current location on September 7, 1991, intended only to stay there for a year amid the extensive renovation of the statehouse. Jim Rhodes was among those who preferred it at the Statehouse, though those in charge of the renovations were in support of its current placement; it remains at the foot of the tower today.

The artwork was surveyed by the Smithsonian Institution's "Save Outdoor Sculpture!" program in 1993.

Identical statues were created for other areas of Ohio. In 2005, a replica was installed in Toledo. In 2013, one was installed outside the Jackson County Courthouse in Jackson, Ohio.

== See also ==
- 1982 in art
