= Art in Architecture =

Program of the General Services Administration

Art in Architecture, (sometimes styled Art-in-Architecture) a program of the General Services Administration, oversees the creation of art in American federal buildings that launched in 1962. The art commissioned and selected is funded through the reserving of half a percent of the projected construction costs. As of 1982, the program had funded 250 works at a cost of US$8,600,000 (equivalent to $28,021,172 in 2024).

Artists eligible to be selected for these commissions must be part of GSA's National Artist Registry, which is open to all American artists who are citizens or permanent residents. Once the piece is created and installed, it becomes part of the GSA's Fine Arts program who are responsible in part for maintaining the piece.

Richard Serra's Tilted Arc was a controversial installation under this program, whose guidelines sometimes change between Presidential administrations.

In 2020, the Trump administration enacted a rule for works commissioned through the program. The controversial rule required works to depict "historically significant Americans or events" or illustrate ideals that the country was founded upon. The order also required works to use lifelike representations of people, not abstract or modernist representations. The rule was reversed by President Biden in 2022.
