= Columbus Division of Police =

Law enforcement agency in Columbus, Ohio

- Common name: Columbus Police
- Abbreviation: CPD
- Motto: Professionalism, Respect, Integrity, Discipline, Enthusiasm

Agency overview
- Formed: 1816
- Employees: 2,156 (2024)
- Annual budget: $382 million (2024)

Jurisdictional structure
- Operations jurisdiction: Columbus, Ohio, USA
- Area: 223.11 sq mi (577.9 km^{2}) (2013)
- Population: 933,263 (2024)
- General nature: Local civilian police

Operational structure
- Headquarters: Columbus Division of Police Headquarters
- Police Officers: 1,811 (2024)
- Civilians: 345 (2024)
- Agency executives: Elaine Bryant, Chief of Police; Lashanna Potts, Assistant Chief of Police; Gregory Bodker, Assistant Chief of Police; Nicholas Konves, Assistant Chief of Police
- Subdivisions: List: Patrol; Public Accountability; Criminal Investigations; Community & Wellness; Support Services; Special Operations

Facilities
- Precincts: 20
- Airbases: 1
- Marked Cruisers: 452
- Motorcycles: 25
- Police Boats: 4
- Helicopters: 5
- Canines: 11
- Horses: 11

Website
- Columbus Police Website

The Columbus Division of Police (CPD) is the primary law enforcement agency for the city of Columbus, Ohio. It is the largest police department in the State of Ohio, and among the twenty-five largest in the United States. Uniformed Patrol Officers staff twenty precincts and six mid-watch units throughout the city on five 8 hour, or four 10 hour shifts. Detective's provide investigative support for major crimes such as Homicides, Sexual Assaults, Robberies, Burglaries, Auto Thefts, Firearm Violations, Missing Persons, Narcotics and Crimes against Minors. Additional units provide specific resources to the division. These teams include: Helicopter Unit, Canine Unit, Mounted Unit, Community Response Teams, Counter Terrorism Unit, Marine Park Unit & Special Weapons and Tactics Team (SWAT) .

Chief Elaine Bryant was named Chief of Police in 2021. As of 2024, the Division was staffed with 1,811 sworn police officers and 345 civilian staff with an estimated budget of $382,581,292. In comparison, in 2016 the staffing was reported as 1,848 sworn officers and 416 civilian staff with an estimated budget of $310,100,000.

== History ==
The department was founded in 1816, when town marshals patrolled the city streets. In 1860, the marshals began operating out of the Central Market, sharing offices with city officials. In April 1873, the city organized the Metropolitan Police. Its first captain, Alexis Keeler, served for one year, and oversaw 19 night officers and six day officers. In 1879, the department opened its second headquarters, a station at the Columbus City Prison. The department and prisoners moved to the city workhouse in Franklinton in 1920. This building was severely damaged by a tornado in May 1929 causing walls to collapse on 162 jail cells, killing two prisoners. In 1930, the department opened the Central Police Station, a new larger building. Finding the space too small by the 1980s, the department opened the current Columbus Division of Police Headquarters in 1991.

As with any large city the division has lost a number of sworn personnel to violence & vehicle crashes. Since its founding in 1816 the division has lost Fifty Six Patrolman, Officers, Sergeants, Lieutenants & a Chief of Police In The Line of Duty. The first officer to fall was Patrolman Cyrus Beebe who was killed on April 27, 1854 during a gunfight with a wanted burglary suspect in downtown. The most recent to fall was Officer Steven M. Smith who was killed on April 12, 2016 by a barricaded arsonist in the Clintonville area.

== Training & Outreach ==
The James G. Jackson Police Training Academy serves at the divisions primary training and education facility. Police recruits are trained for six months before becoming sworn officers. This basic training is followed by 15 weeks of coaching with Field Training Officers. A probation period of one year rounds out the basic training cycle. All members of the division attend additional training yearly at the academy as well.

While the academy primarily serves Columbus police it also trains officers of other police departments in Ohio and across the county. This training includes basic and advanced training offered to law enforcement agencies. Standards and testing for Ohio Peace Officers are established by the Ohio Peace Officer Training Academy.

The Division has partnered with Central Ohio Crime Stoppers for decades to solicit tips on major crime investigations. In recent years the Division launched a YouTube Channel to spotlight unsolved crimes and to highlight other investigations (see external links). The Division also publishes a PodCast called 'The Fifth Floor' (see external links). This audio program focuses on unsolved homicides and the lasting trauma of survivors. Facebook, Instagram and X channels also are routinely updated with content.

=== Budget and Retirements ===
The City of Columbus spent $359 million on the department in 2020, including $332 million in personnel costs. This is contrasted by Cleveland at $218 million and Cincinnati at $151 million. The city has spent about $300 million each year on the department. 2019 costs include $345 million for police, $266 million for fire, $40 million in development (planning, housing, administration, etc.) $24 million for the health department, $5 million for the neighborhoods department, $40 million for recreation and parks, $31 million for trash collection, and about $31 million on its municipal court.

The department operates four aircraft, including four helicopters. The fleet costs $6.55 million a year. The cost of the fleet equals the base salaries for 70 police officers at the top of the nine-year union step schedule of $92,934 a year. Along with the commander of the helicopter unit, there are 20 pilots. In 2021, the unit stirred controversy when one of its helicopters spelled CPD in flight, as viewed in a flight-tracker.

In 2010 media reports indicated that some officers were becoming millionaires in retirement. Sworn Officers retirements are managed by a state agency, Ohio Police & Fire Retirement Fund (OP&F). Police Officers and Firefighters have the ability to enroll in the Deferred Retirement Option Plan (DROP). The program allows members to enter the retirement process while still employed by their municipalities. Retirement funds are deferred for up to eight years. After leaving full time employment members have access to these funds. Members living to age 78 may be eligible to collect an estimated $3.25 million through the program, with only $74,000 contributed from the officer.

The Deferred Retirement Option Plan (DROP) was requested by the Ohio Chief of Police and Ohio Fire Chiefs (associations) as a means to retain trained and seasoned employees. This optional benefit allows members who are eligible to retire to stay on duty serving their communities for up to eight years. Although different opinions exist concerning the DROP program it has allowed for retention of firefighters and police officers that would have otherwise not been replaced due to budgetary concerns. The program is administered by the Police & Fire Retirement Fund (OP&F) and is managed as a budget neutral option and periodically reviewed for renewal by the board.

OP&F was created in 1965 in an effort to consolidate 454 local public safety pension funds across Ohio. Currently OP&F serves approximately 27,000 active members and more than 30,000 retirees and their beneficiaries. The fund receives monies from active member and their employers. Those funds are invested and proceeds are distributed as benefits to retirees and other beneficiaries. The OP&F Board of Directors consist of Active & Retired police officers and firefighters as well as appointed members representing the State of Ohio.

In 2024, Officer Adam Banks was determined to be Columbus’ top paid employee with an earnings total of $349,699.44 of which $204,143.15 was overtime.

=== Allegations of Misconduct ===
On October 21, 1999, the US Department of Justice filed a lawsuit against the city based on its findings that "CPD officers are engaged in a pattern or practice of using excessive force, making false arrests and lodging false charges, and conducting improper searches and seizures in violation of the Fourth and Fourteenth Amendments to the Constitution." A year later, the DOJ also found that the department engaged in racial profiling. An effort to have the Division sign a Consent Decree failed, in part because the FOP Lodge was permitted to join the lawsuit as an involved party. In 2002, a federal judge dismissed the lawsuit after the city made changes on the use of force and the handling of complaints against officers.

The Department of Public and its Director's report to the Mayor’s Office. Past Public Safety Director’s have been criticized for the rehiring of police officers previously fired for misconduct. In 2016, Officer Eric Moore was fired for overtime fraud but later rehired. In that same year Office Chad Knode was fired for profiting off the sale of city-owned property. An investigation was centered on the misappropriation of items transferred to the Division from the US Department of Defense. He was rehired but his partner in the episode, Officer Steven Dean, was eventually jailed on unrelated charges. In 2017, Officer Zachary Rosen was fired for kicking a handcuffed man in the head. He was rehired after an Arbitrator ruled his firing was not inline with past practice.

In June 2018, officers of the Division's Vice Unit improperly arrested Adult Performer Stormy Daniels at a strip club. The prosecution was declined by the Columbus City Attorney Office. Stormy Daniels has claimed that she had an affair with Donald Trump before he was elected U.S. president. Later in the year a supervisor who had been recommended for firing by the Chief of Police due to discrimination charges was reinstated by the Safety Director.

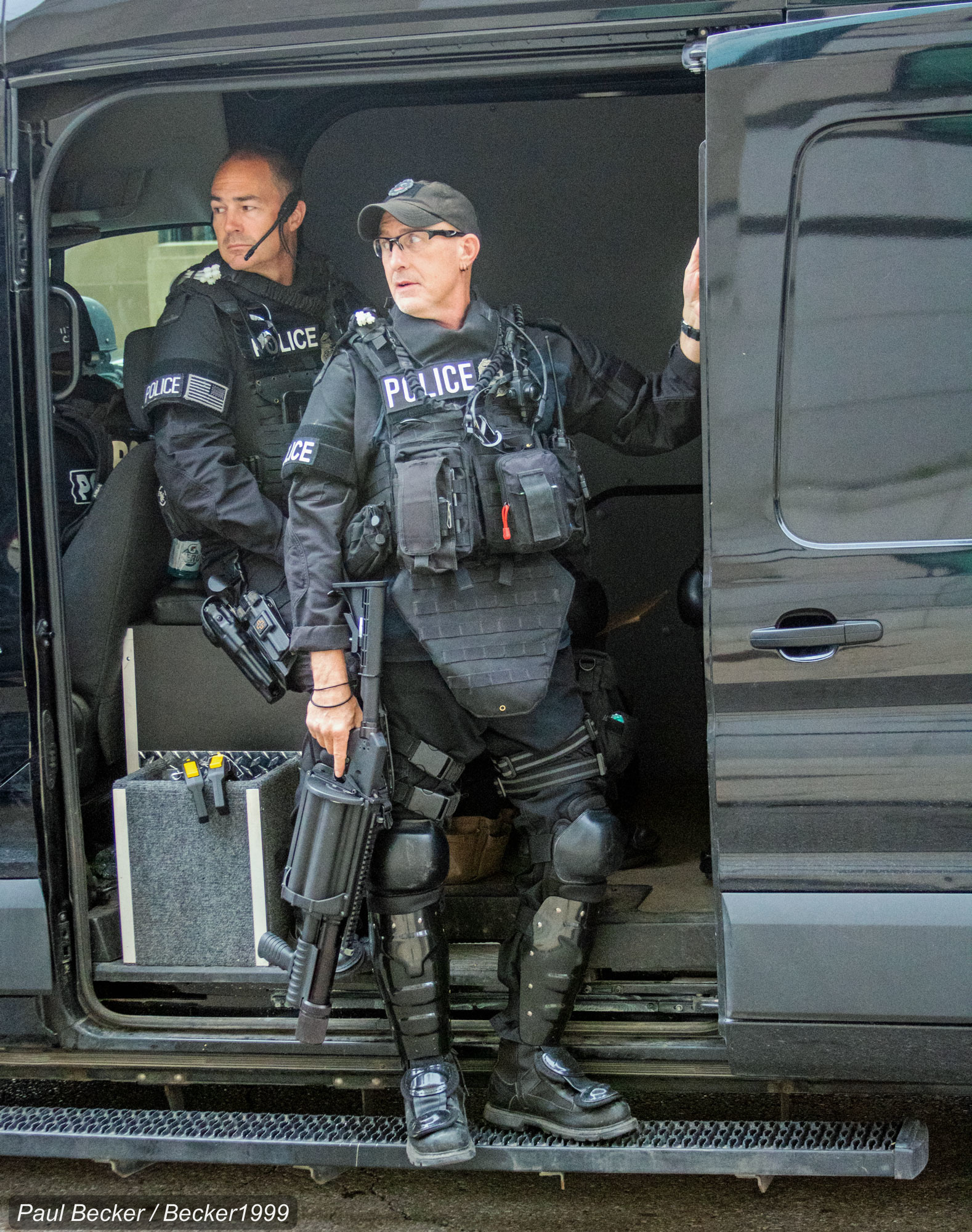
Riot police in downtown Columbus during the 2020 George Floyd protests

In March 2019. Officer Andrew Mitchell, a thirty-one-year veteran of the force, was charged by the United States District Attorney with kidnapping under the color of authority (law). He is accused of raping women that he had arrested in exchange for their freedom. The Franklin County Prosecutor's Office later acquired state level indictments against Officer Mitchell that involved a shooting and death of a female. The ten-officer, three-supervisor VICE unit that he was a member has since been disbanded. The abolishment of this unit came after a month's long 'stand down' and unit review. The action to disband the unit had been anticipated for some time.

The Columbus Division of Police has been criticized for its aggressive handling of the George Floyd protests happening in Columbus. On May 31, seven cases of excessive police force during the protests were reported by the local news site Columbus Navigator. They include instances of police using pepper spray on protesters walking away or leaving protests and removing a protester's mask in order to spray them. On the following day, Mayor Andrew Ginther and Columbus City Council denounced the police chief and his officers for their aggressive tactics. Ginther created an independent review board for police actions: he asks protesters to report instances of excessive force by police during the protests, to be reviewed by a civilian from the Department of Public Safety's Equal Employment Opportunity Compliance Office. Janet E. Jackson was the first chair of the Columbus Civilian Police Review Board. In 2021, a federal judge imposed an injunction on the CPD's use of tear gas and rubber bullets on protestors. The judge found that the department had used violence "random and indiscriminately" against peaceful protestors.

In December 2020, an unarmed man, Andre Hill was killed by Officer Adam Coy. The officer, a seventeen-year veteran of the department was arrested and charged with murder, felonious assault and dereliction of duty. Police officers at the scene had not turned their body cameras on and did not give first aid to the dying man. The trial has been repeatedly postponed as of April, 2024.

On August 30, 2022, Officer Ricky Anderson shot and killed Donovan Lewis while serving a warrant in the early hours of the morning. Lewis was unarmed and laying in his bed. In response, Chief Elaine Bryant barred officers from executing arrest warrants at private homes for minor offenses between the hours of 11 p.m. and 6 a.m. unless approved by a lieutenant or higher officer.

=== Rank & Division Structure ===
Current rankings are as follows: (generally as of 2021)

RANK	INSIGNIA	EPAULET	COAT SLEEVE
Chief of police			
Assistant Chief			
Deputy Chief			
Commander			
Lieutenant			
Sergeant		None	None
Police Officer	No Insignia	None	None

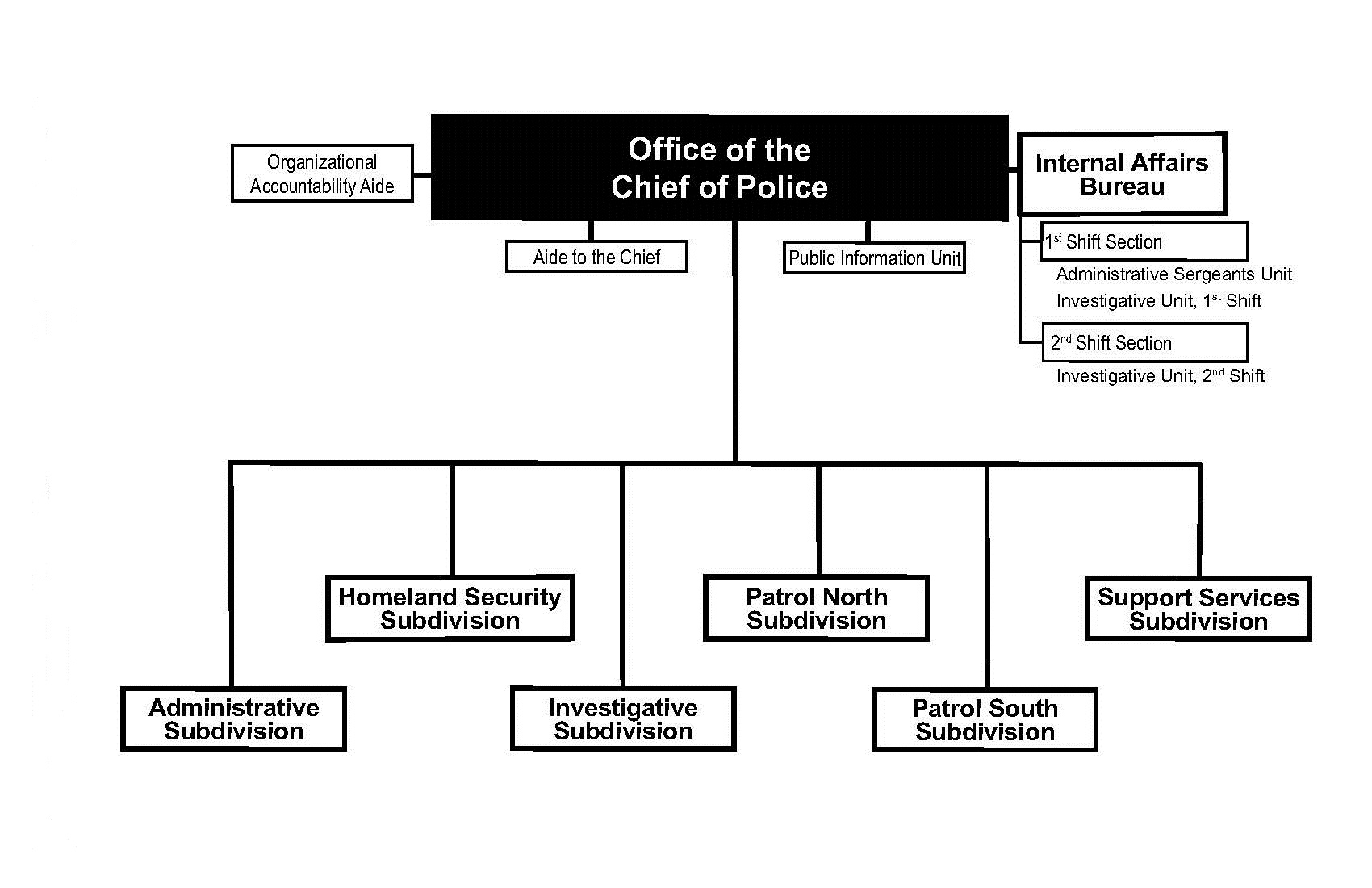
CPD 2015 Organization Chart

== Equipment ==
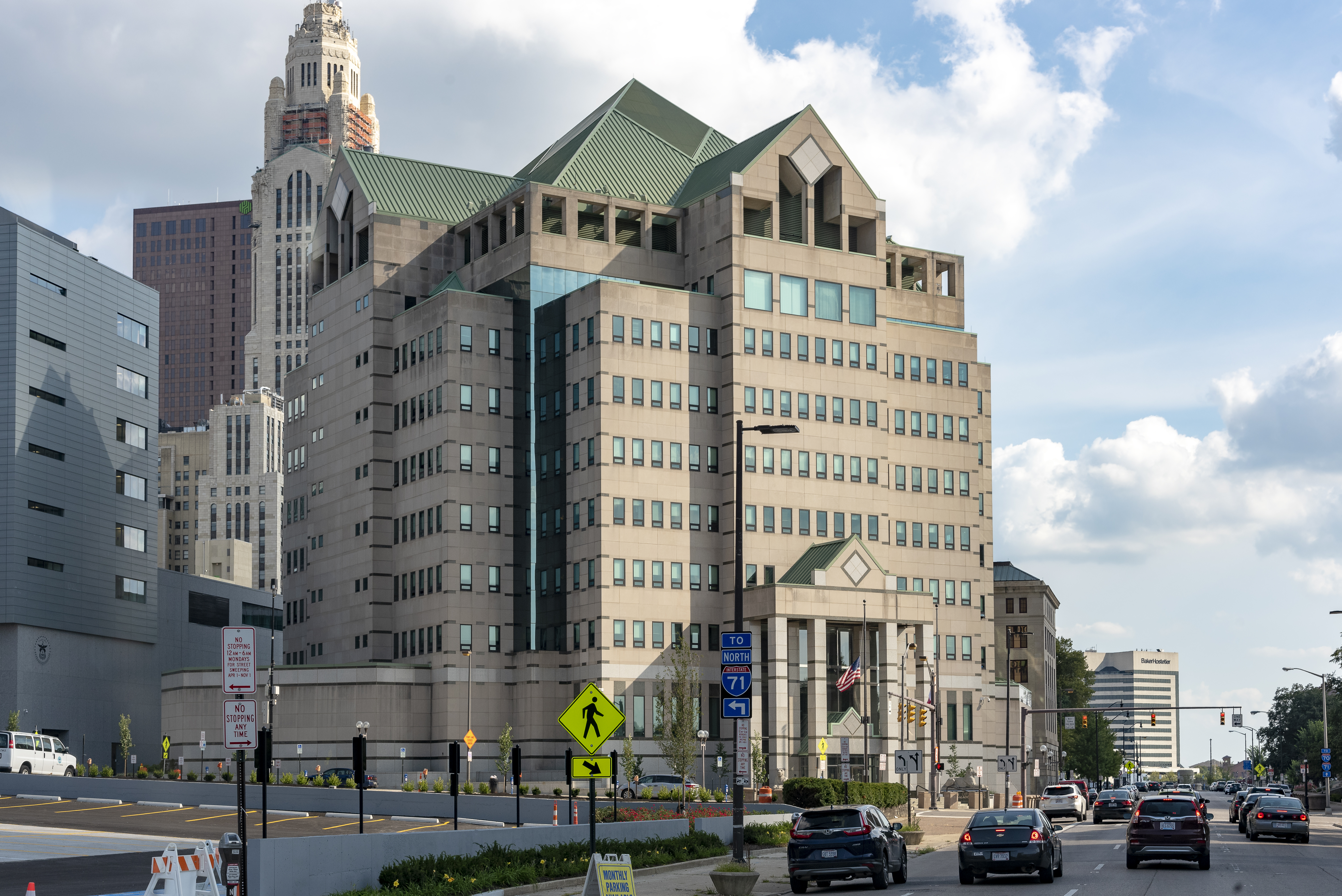
Columbus Division of Police Headquarters, in the city's downtown Civic Center

As of 2024, the Division had 452 marked patrol vehicles, 260 unmarked vehicles, 25 motorcycles, 300 bicycles, five boats, eleven horses, eleven police dogs, and four helicopters.

=== Patrol Subdivision ===
Deputy Chief is Smith Weir supervises uniformed patrol officers and supervisors. There are six Patrol Zones that cover the geographical limits of the city. These zones are further divided into twenty precincts. This Subdivision is the largest by staffing within the Division. Uniformed Patrol Officers handle 911 emergency calls & calls for service from residents. In past years this position held the title of 'Chief of Patrol'.

=== Community & Wellness Subdivision ===
Deputy Chief Elrico Alli leads this subdivision with a mission focused on community outreach & interaction through Community Liaison Officers, Special Events, and the Event Management Unit. This segment of the division also houses the Therapy Dog Unit, Mounted Unit, Wellness Center & Court Liaison who assist Franklin County Court System.

=== Public Accountability Subdivision ===
Deputy Chief Mark Denner supervises this subdivision which includes the Training Bureau, Professional Standards Bureau, Internal Affairs Bureau, Fiscal Management, and Human Resources. Background Investigations for police recruits falls within this subdivision as well.

=== Criminal Investigations Subdivision ===
Deputy Chief Justin Coleman leads Detectives responsible for felony investigations. The Criminal Investigations Subdivision includes Homicide Bureau, Major Crimes Bureau, Special Victims Bureau, and Property Crimes Bureau. Homicide, Robbery, Gun Crimes, Sexual Assault and Missing Persons are only some of the investigative units assigned to this subdivision. In past years this position held the title of 'Chief of Detectives'.

=== Support Services Subdivision ===
Deputy Chief Timothy Myers leads this Subdivision, which includes Forensics, Records Management, Support Operations and Wellness. These bureaus include units such as the Crime Lab, Fleet, Records, Identification, Evidence room & Impound lot.

=== Special Operations Subdivision ===
Deputy Chief Robert Sagle leads Special Operations Subdivision. This subdivision includes the Special Services Bureau and Organized Crime Bureau. The bureaus include specialized units such as SWAT, Canine, Aviation, Counter-Terrorism, Marine Park, Traffic Operations, Narcotics Investigations, Nuisance, Criminal Gang Intelligence, and Task Force Operations.

=== Chief of Police ===
The division's current Chief of Police is Elaine Bryant. Chief Bryant was previously with the Detroit Police Department.

Previous Chiefs of Police include: Interim Chief Michael Woods - appointed 2021, Chief Thomas Quinlan - appointed 2019, Chief Kimberley Jacobs - appointed 2012, Interim Chief Gammill - appointed 2012, Chief Walter Distelzweig - appointed 2009, Chief James G. Jackson - appointed 1990, Chief D. Joseph - appointed 1983, Chief Burden - appointed 1972, and Chief W. Joseph appointed 1970.

Chief of Police Frederick F. Kundts was killed In The Line of Duty in 1936. Chief Kundts was assisting the Ohio Highway Patrol in surveying flood damage in southwest Ohio when the vehicle he was driving was struck by a suspected drunk driver.

=== Labor Representation ===
Police officers employed by the city are represented by their local union, Fraternal Order of Police Capital City Lodge No. 9. The union represents law enforcement professionals in 28 departments in the central Ohio region. Public workers gained the right to engage in Collective Bargaining in 1984.

== See also ==
- Government of Columbus, Ohio
- Killing of Andre Hill
- Killing of Ma'Khia Bryant
- List of law enforcement agencies in Ohio
