= Columbus Civic Center (Ohio) =

Civic center in downtown Columbus, Ohio

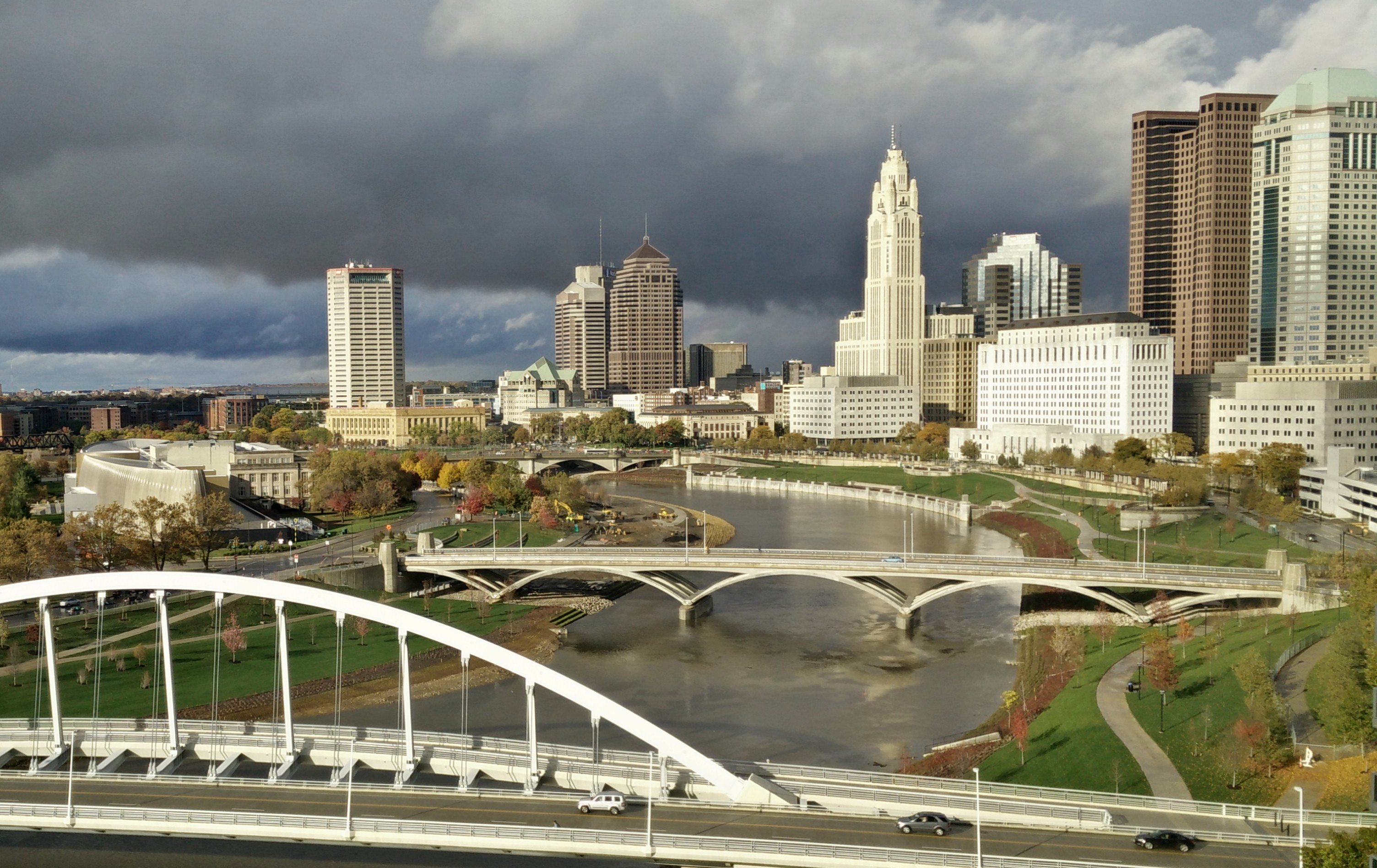
The Columbus Civic Center features government buildings lining the Scioto Mile and River

Interactive map of district;
1988-proposed boundaries and properties marked in red; see also
map of riverfront parks

The Columbus Civic Center is a civic center, a collection of government buildings, museums, and open park space in Downtown Columbus, Ohio. The site is located along the Scioto Mile recreation area and historically was directly on the banks of the Scioto River.

The civic center includes Columbus City Hall, the Ohio Judicial Center, Central High School (now the COSI science museum), the Joseph P. Kinneary United States Courthouse, and the former Central Police Station. It also included the Scioto River Bridge Group. Also sometimes included in the civic center are the LeVeque Tower and newer government office additions to the area, including the Front Street office buildings, the since-demolished Franklin County Veterans Memorial and Columbus Public Health office in Franklinton, as well as the newer Michael B. Coleman Government Center and current Columbus Division of Police Headquarters.

Following a local version of the City Beautiful movement, the Columbus Plan first envisioned a riverfront civic center in 1908. The Great Flood of 1913 destroyed many riverfront structures, allowing the opportunity to redevelop according to the 1908 plan. Columbus's most prominent architect, Frank Packard, spearheaded the project until his unexpected death in 1923. The Neoclassical, Renaissance Revival, and Art Deco buildings, bridges, and retaining wall were built from 1917 to 1934. In 1988, the area was nominated to the National Register of Historic Places as the Columbus Civic Center Historic District.

== Historic district ==
The Columbus Civic Center Historic District is a historic district comprising most of the civic center. It includes Central High School (NRHP-listed, 1924), Columbus City Hall (built 1928), the former Central Police Station (1930), the Ohio Judicial Center (NRHP-listed, 1933), and the Joseph P. Kinneary United States Courthouse (NRHP-listed, 1934). It also includes the riverfront retaining wall, spanning from Broad to Town Streets. The c. 1921 Scioto River Bridge Group (comprising the Broad Street, Town Street, and Main Street Bridges) was listed, though the bridges were replaced in recent decades by the Discovery Bridge, the Rich Street Bridge, and a new Main Street Bridge. The Front Street office buildings were included as non-contributing buildings.

The historic district's nomination to the National Register of Historic Places was prepared in the late 1980s by the City of Columbus's Economic Development Division. The district was determined to be eligible for the National Register on September 14, 1988, due to its association with community planning, engineering, government, and transportation in the city, and for its Art Deco, Neoclassical, and Renaissance Revival architecture. Even though its suitability was confirmed, the district was never listed.

== History ==
When Columbus was founded, the only planned green spaces downtown were around the Ohio Statehouse and in front of the Carnegie Library. The 1908 Columbus Plan recommended more green spaces, public promenades, and beautification. The plan urged the removal of the numerous factories, coal yards, boarding houses, and tenements stretching along the riverfront downtown. The city's prison, storage facilities, and a junk shop were also located on the riverfront there. Overall, about two dozen buildings deposited untreated sewage directly into the Scioto and Olentangy rivers between Clintonville and the South Side. The cleanup was urged to present a positive view of the city for travelers on the National Road entering Columbus from the west.

Following a local version of the City Beautiful movement, the Columbus Plan first envisioned a riverfront civic center in 1908. The plan aimed to visually unite both banks of the river along with the nearby Capitol Square, and build classically inspired yet simple buildings, surrounded by open spaces, parks, and parkways. Development was slow, though the Great Flood of 1913 in Columbus dramatically affected the area, destroying many riverfront buildings and both of its bridges. It gave the city the opportunity to redevelop the riverfront into its planned civic center, though with added flood control - a retaining wall and low head dam. The civic center layout was expanded to two to three times its original size. From 1917 to 1922, the Broad Street and Town Street Bridges, parallel Neoclassical structures, were built, along with the still-intact retaining wall between the bridges. In the early 1920s, the plan included a Masonic temple at the current site of the federal courthouse, and a park for World War I veterans at the site of the Judicial Center.

The old Columbus City Hall was destroyed in a fire in 1921, allowing a new city hall to be built within the new civic center. In 1923, architect Frank Packard began a new civic center plan. He was Columbus's most prominent architect at the time, and organized the Allied Architects Association of Columbus to work on the civic center plan. Packard died later that year while working on the plan, before any of its buildings were built. The bridges, and other riverfront structures were already under construction or complete, but it led to the city planning its police station there, as well as an office building for state departments, and later the federal government moving its post office and courthouse from its former Capitol Square location to the new civic center. In 1924, Central High School opened, the first building built along the river since the 1908 plan was published. The school was designed following the plan, and its stone facade and scale acted as a link between the planned government buildings on the east bank with the school on the west. The site's government buildings were built next, between 1926 and 1934. Other government buildings, offices, and museums have been built in the civic center in years since.

== Gallery ==
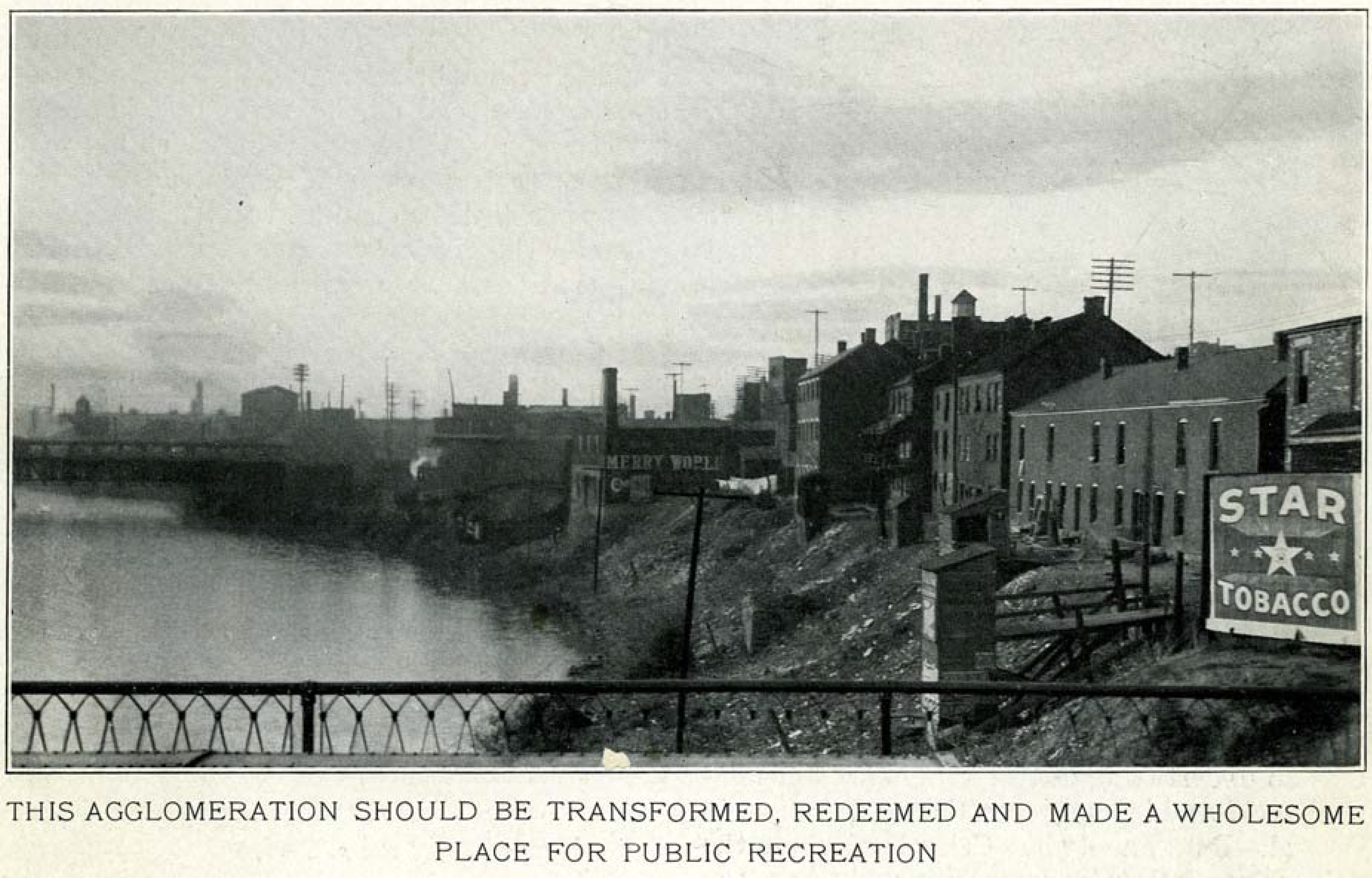
Riverside condition in 1908

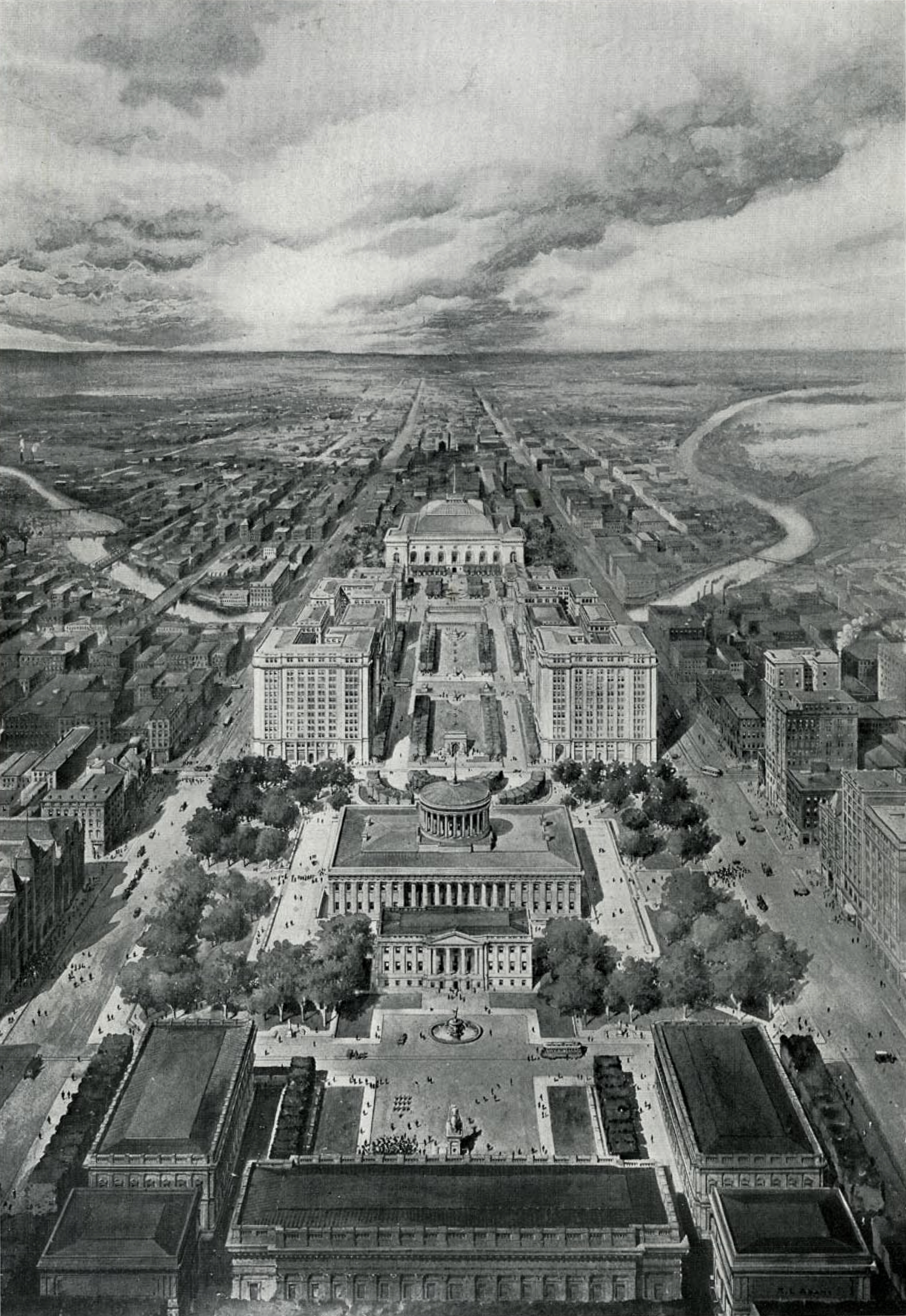
Illustration of the 1908 civic center proposal

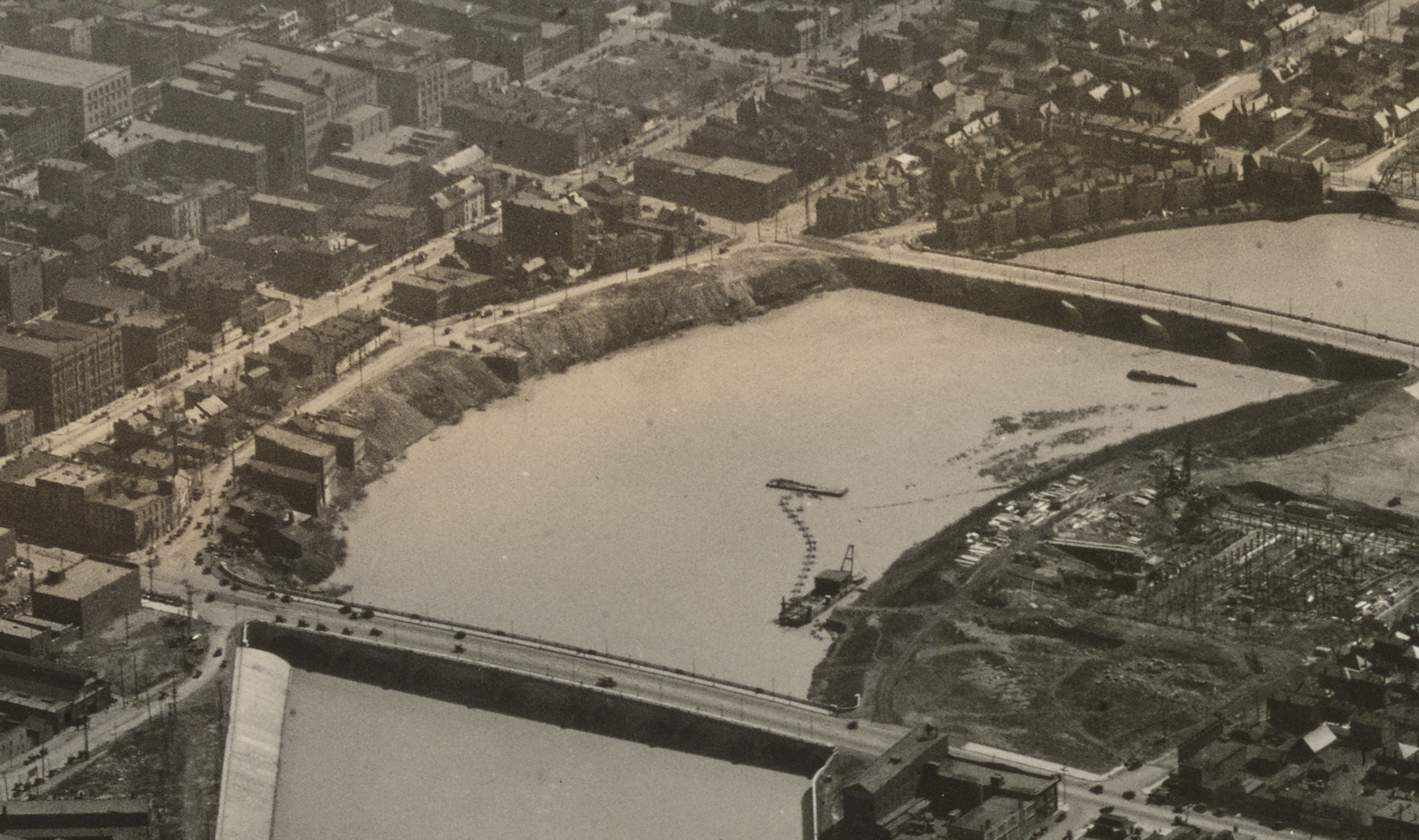
C. 1923, as the riverfront cleanup began

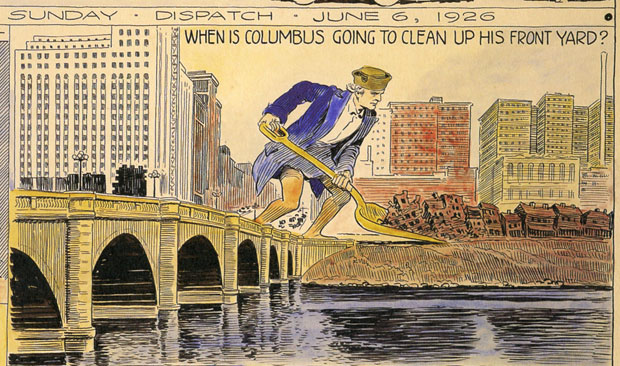
Billy Ireland cartoon for the Columbus Dispatch in 1926, urging more prompt redevelopment

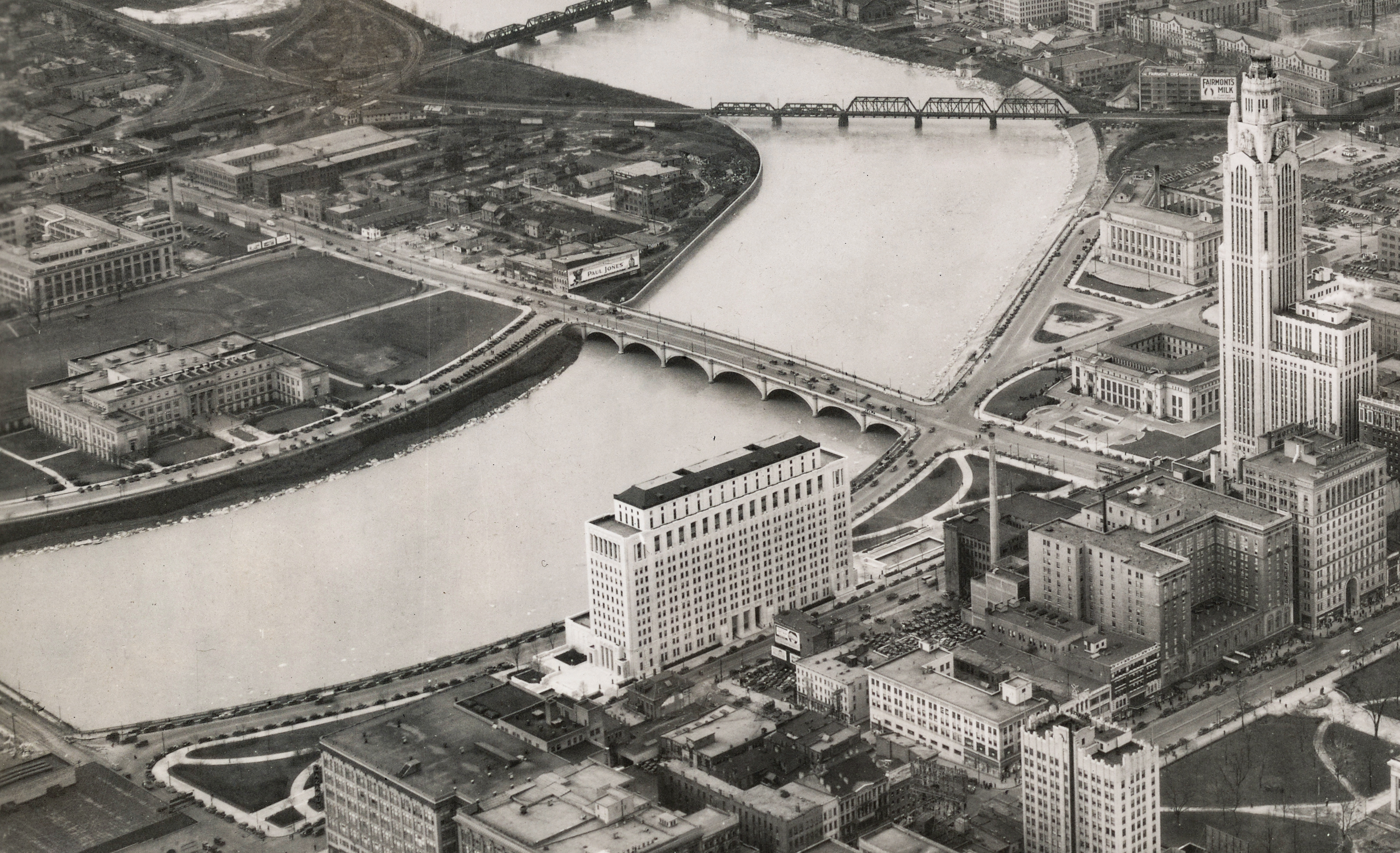
The completed civic center, 1936

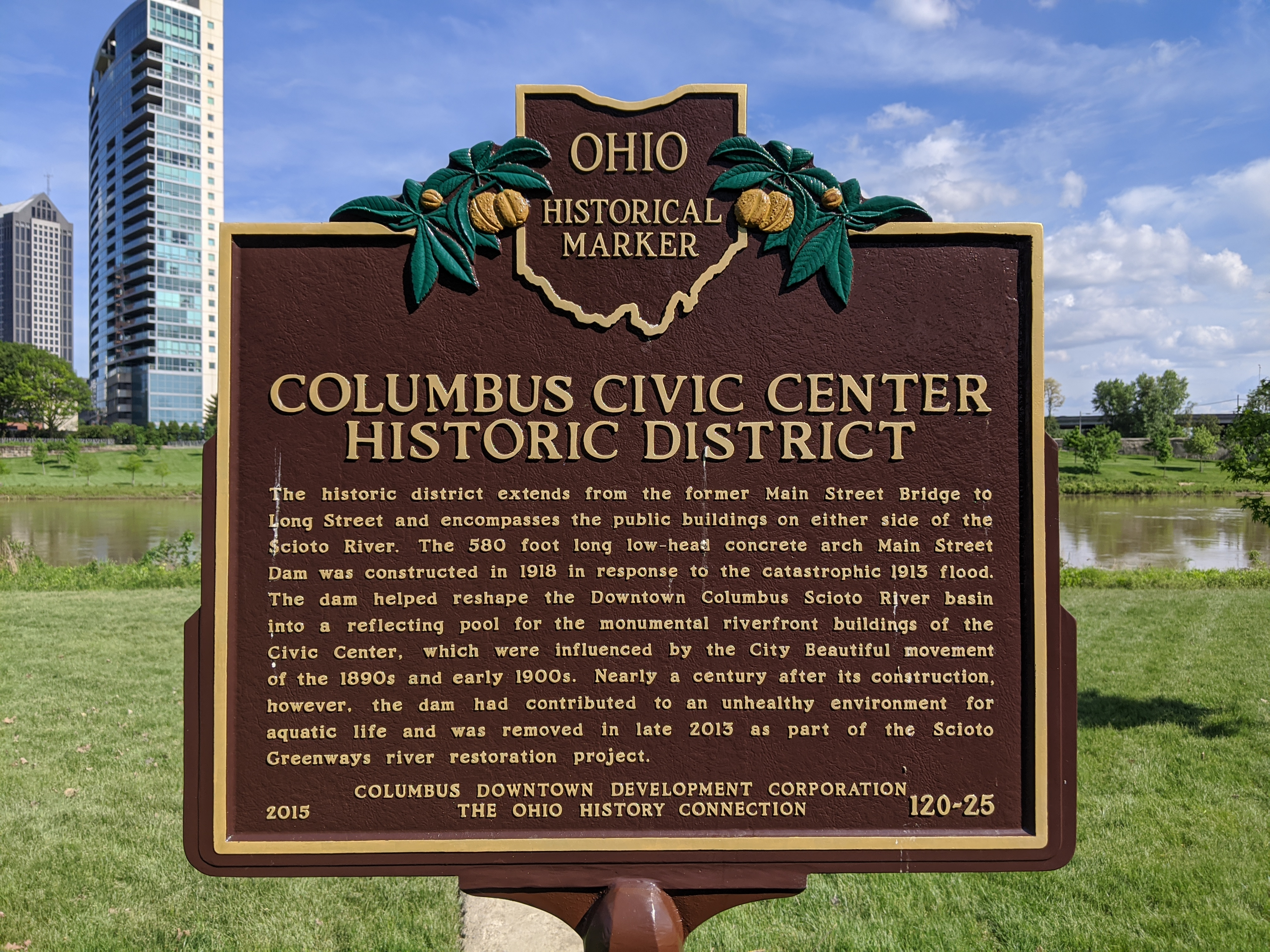
Historical marker

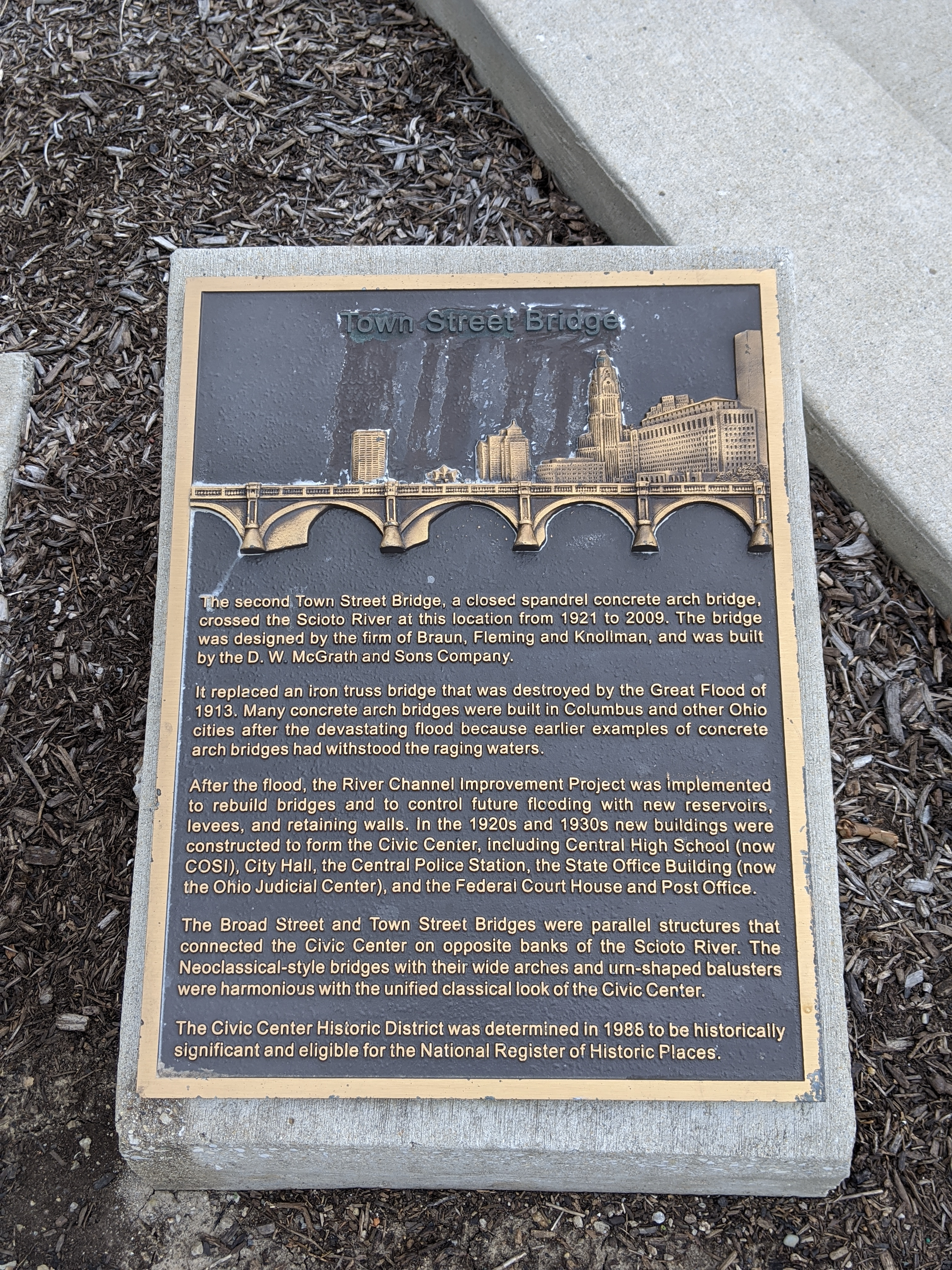
Plaque commemorating the civic center, bridges, and related riverfront improvements
