= Rich Street Bridge =

Overpass in Columbus, Ohio

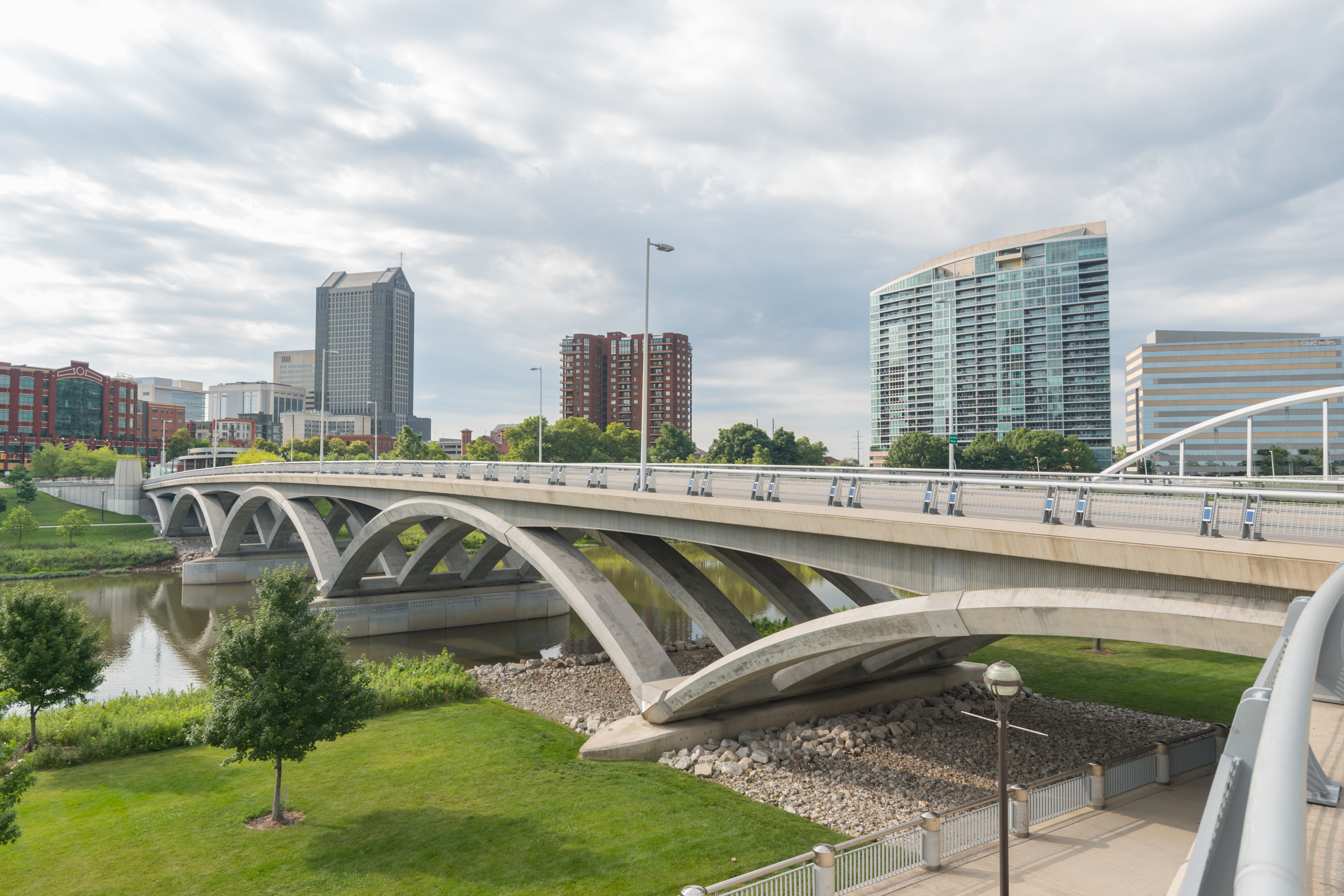
- Coordinates: 39°57′26.8″N 83°0′18.3″W
- Carries: US 62 / SR 3 (Rich Street)
- Crosses: Scioto River
- Locale: Columbus, Ohio
- Maintained by: Ohio Department of Transportation

Location
- Interactive map pinpointing the Rich Street Bridge

The Rich Street Bridge is a bridge in Columbus, Ohio, United States, spanning the Scioto River and connecting downtown's Rich Street to Franklinton's Town Street. It carries U.S. Route 62 (US 62) and Ohio State Route 3 (SR 3). The bridge was completed in 2012.

The bridge replaced the Town Street Bridge (1917-2009). The original eastern anchor remains, reutilized as the Prow, an observation platform in the Scioto Mile Promenade park. The site features stone benches, lanterns, and a grove of birch trees. The 1917 bridge was part of the Scioto River Bridge Group, listed on the Columbus Register of Historic Properties in 1983 and proposed as part of the Columbus Civic Center Historic District, nominated to the National Register of Historic Places in 1988.

== Gallery ==
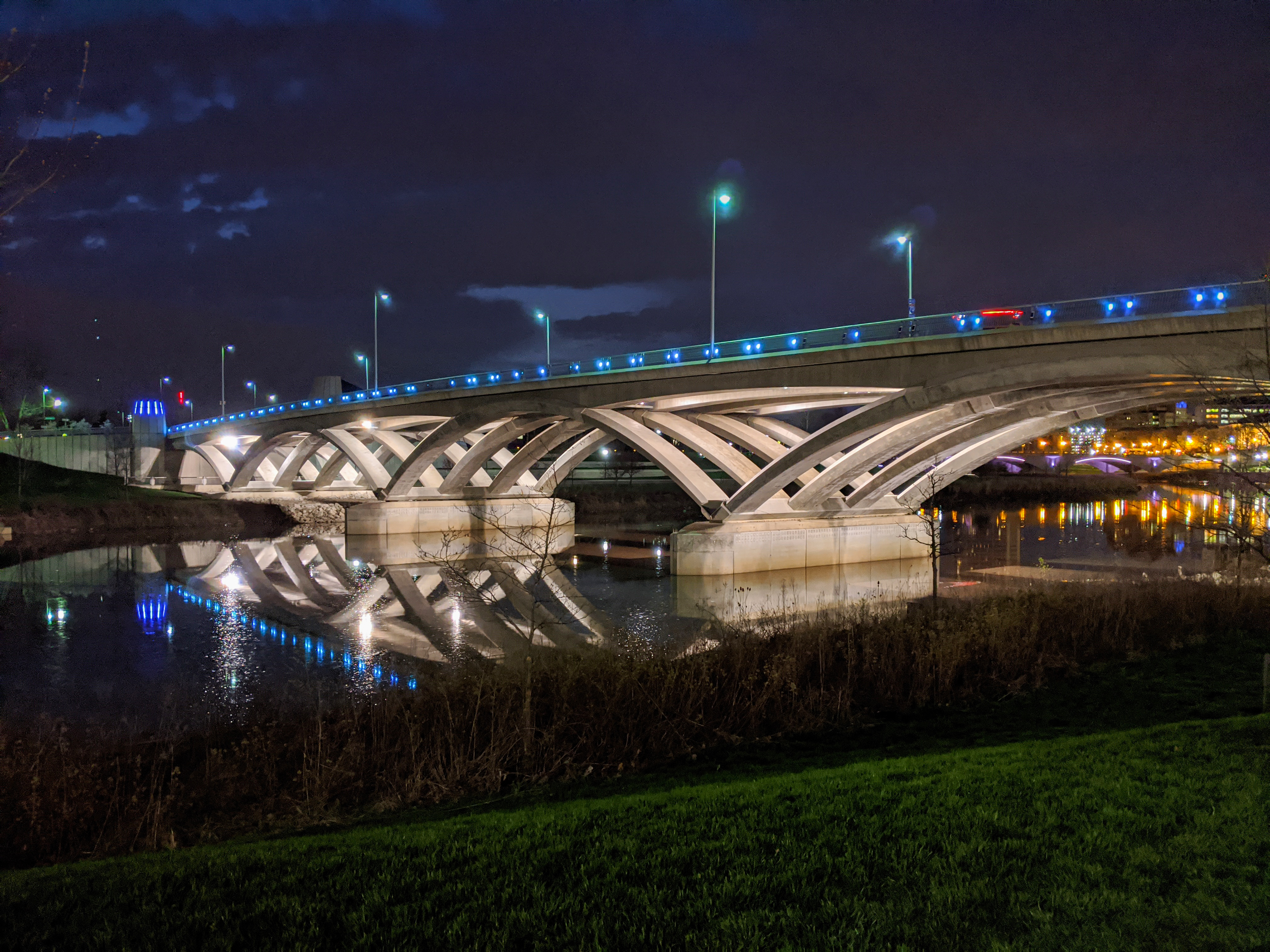
Night lighting

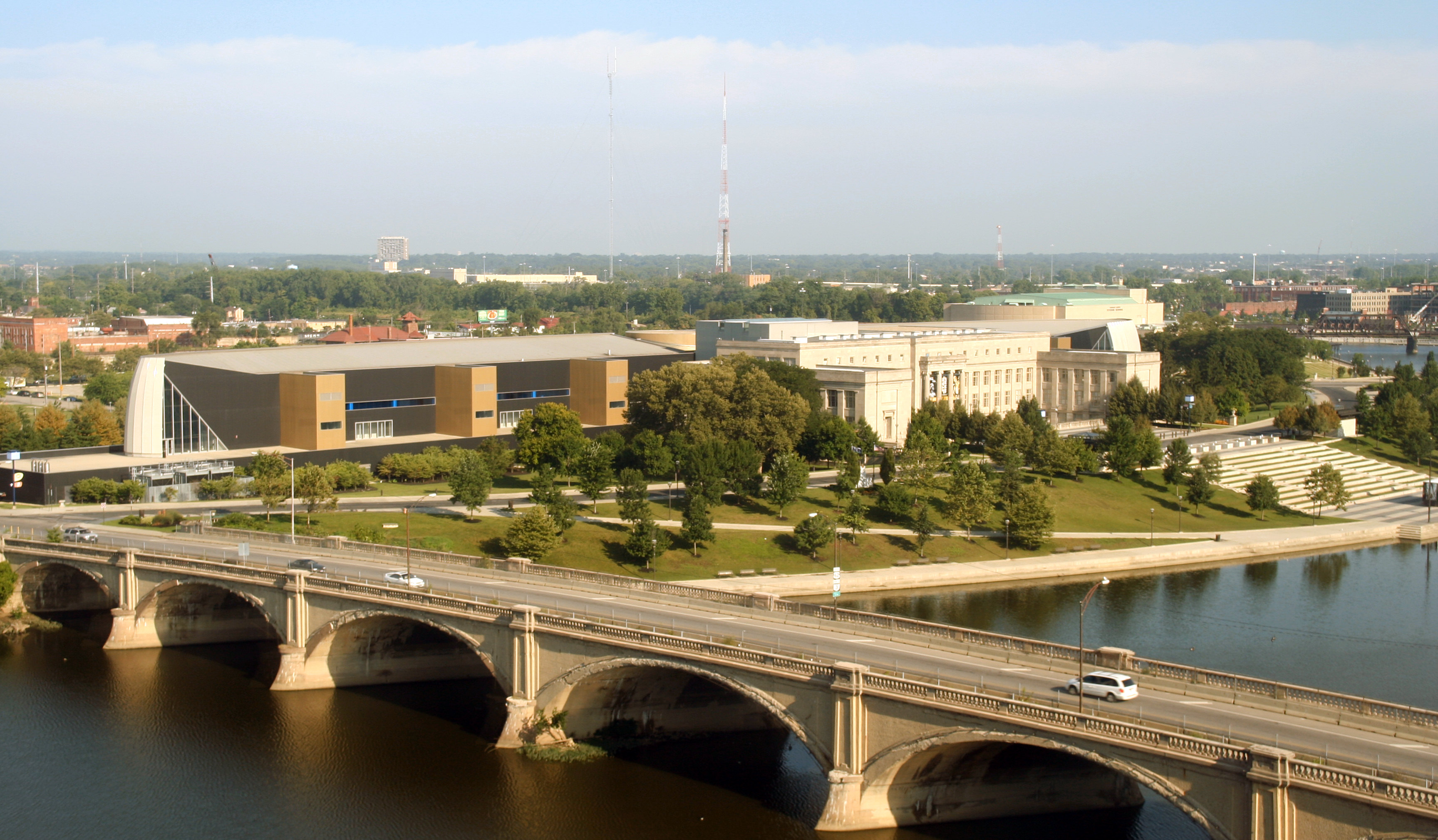
The prior bridge in 2006

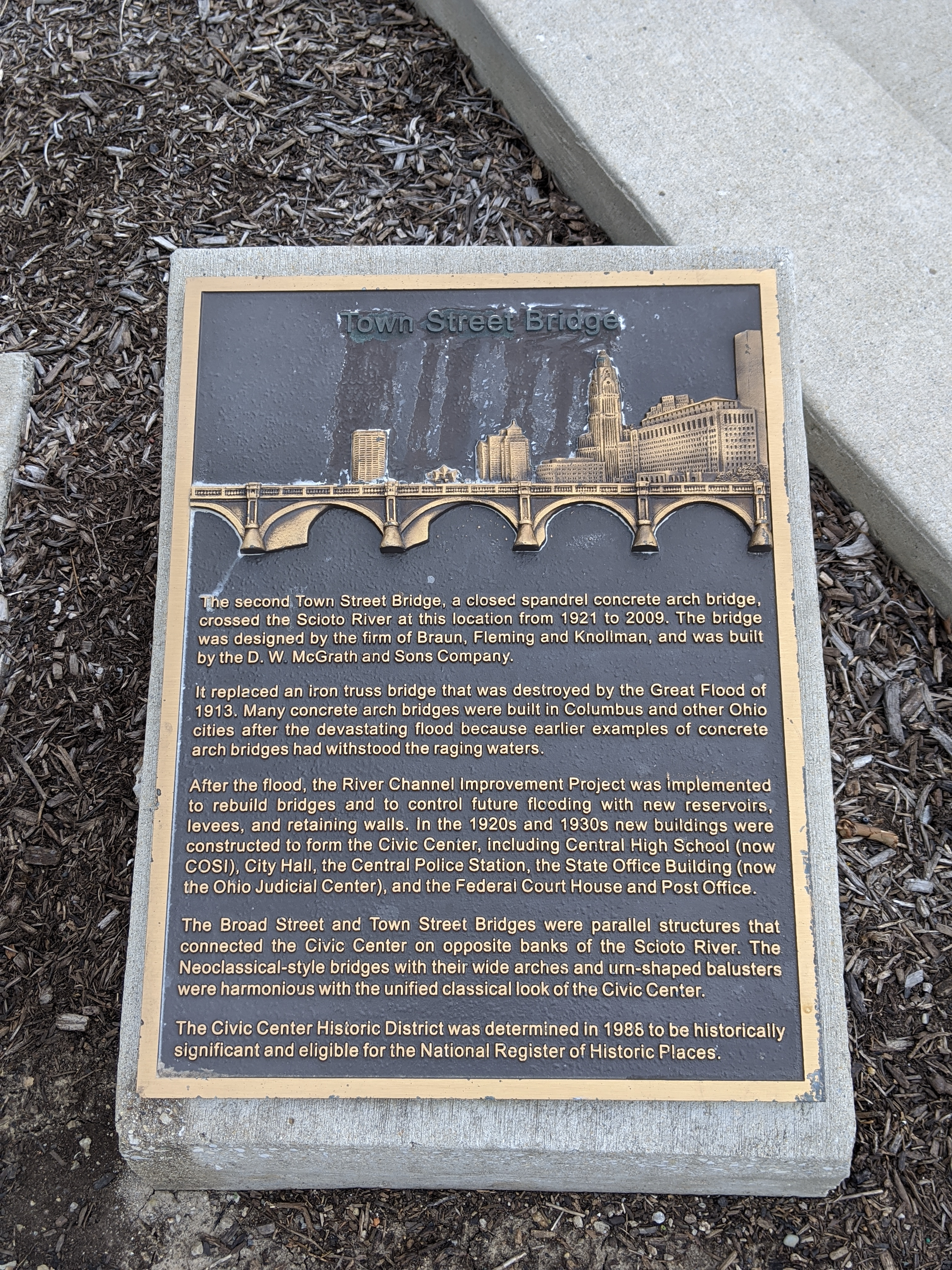
Plaque commemorating prior bridges

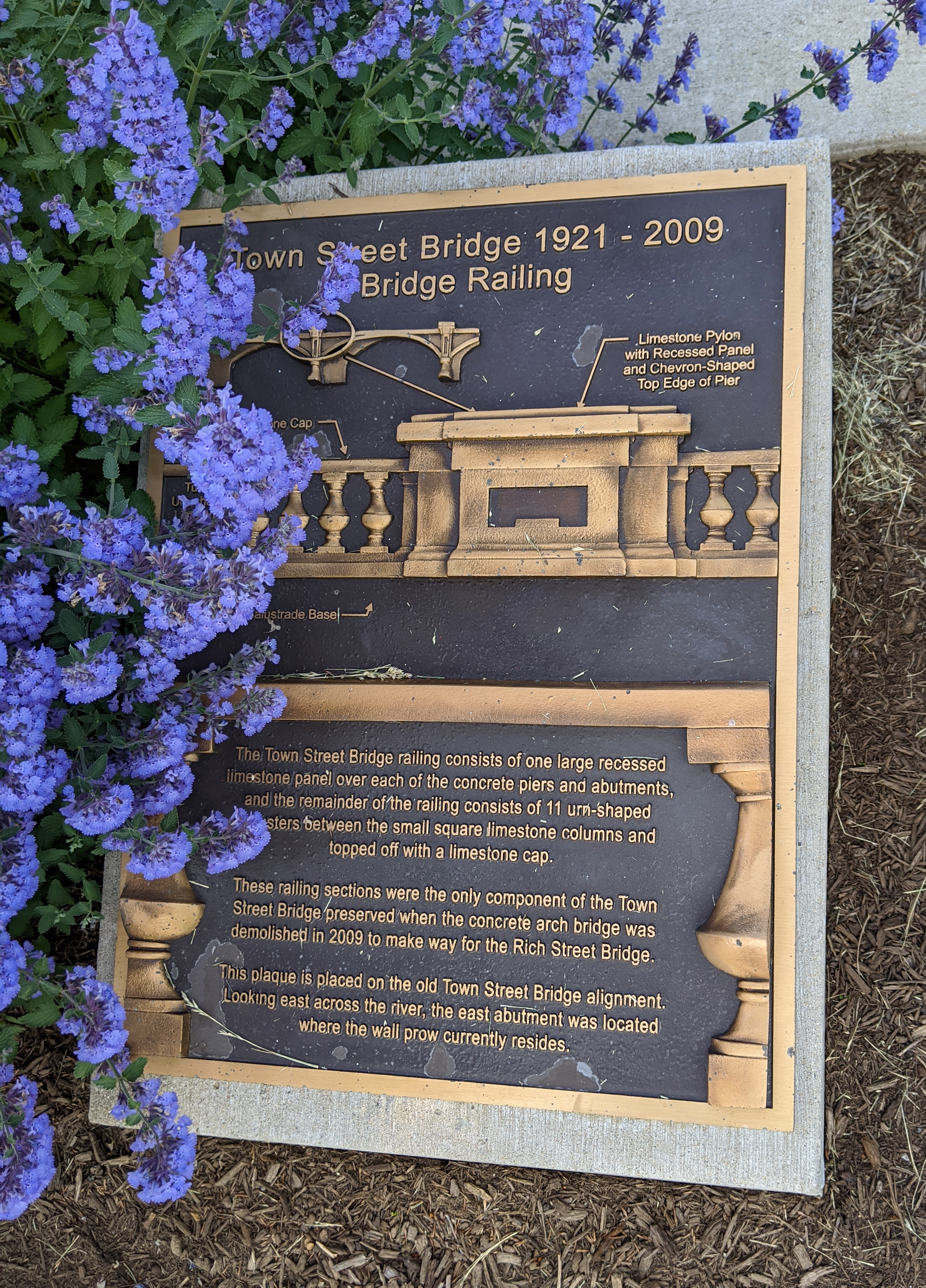
Town Street Bridge plaque

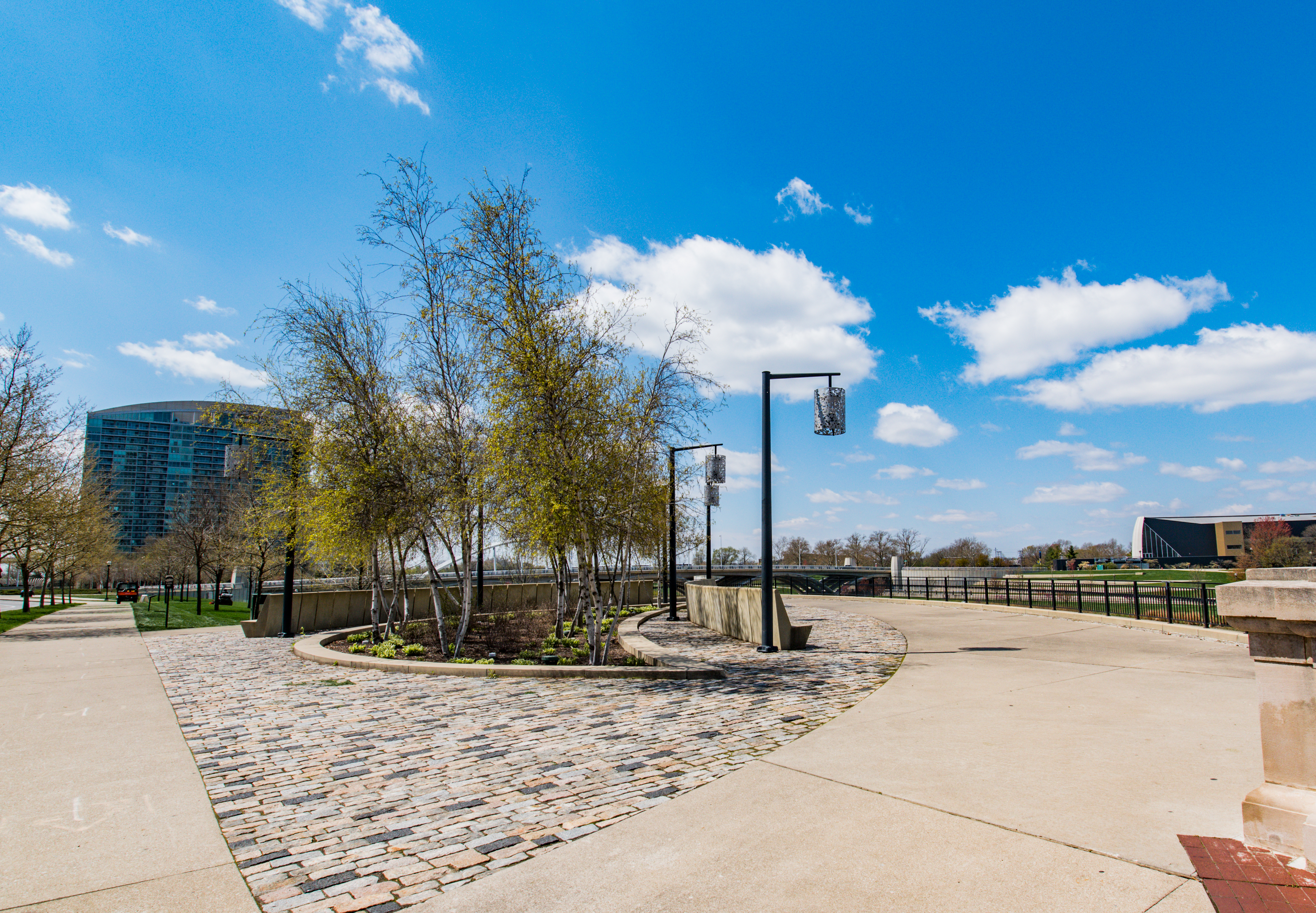
The Prow, formerly an anchor to the Town Street Bridge

== See also ==
- Scioto Lounge
