= Main Street Bridge (Columbus, Ohio) =

Overpass on the Scioto River

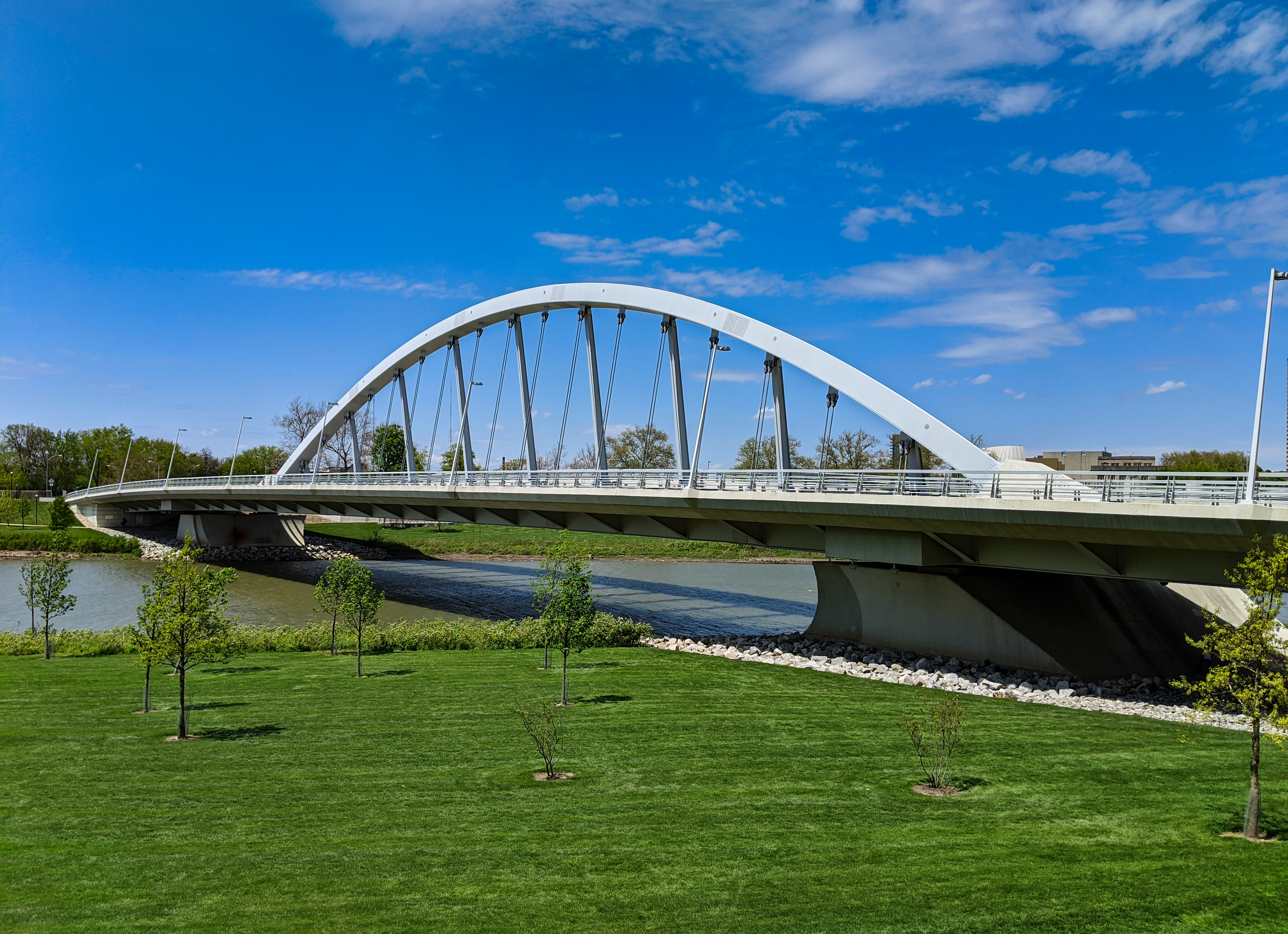
- Coordinates: 39°57′22″N 83°00′24″W
- Carries: US 62 / SR 3 (Main Street); 3, 6, 9
- Crosses: Scioto River
- Locale: Columbus, Ohio
- Maintained by: Ohio Department of Transportation
- ID number: 2503220

Characteristics
- Design: inclined arch
- Total length: 700 feet (210 m)
- Width: about 65 feet (20 m)
- Longest span: 400 feet (120 m)
- No. of lanes: 2 eastbound, 1 westbound, 1 pedestrian

History
- Construction start: 2006
- Construction end: July 2010
- Opened: July 30, 2010

The Main Street Bridge in Columbus, Ohio is a 700 ft (210 m), three-span, inclined tied arch bridge over the Scioto River. The bridge is the first in North America and the fifth in the world to use an inclined single-rib-tied arch superstructure. The final cost for the bridge was $60.1 million. It carries Main Street (U.S. Route 62 and Ohio State Route 3) northwest from Downtown Columbus into Franklinton, splitting into Rich and Starling Streets just west of the bridge.

== History ==
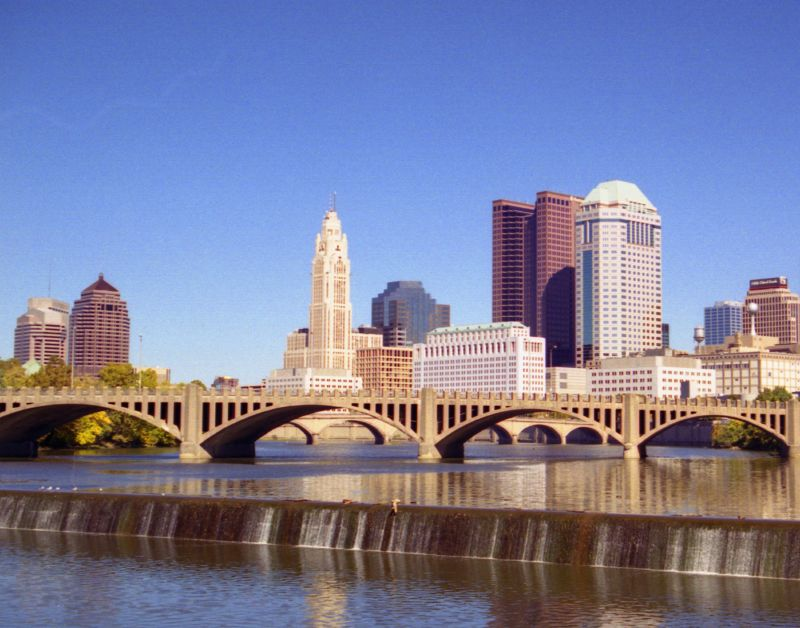
1937 bridge in foreground

The original Main Street bridge was a Whipple through truss bridge built in 1890 over the Scioto River. It was lengthened in 1917 using two spans salvaged from a railroad bridge a short distance downstream of the bridge. In the 1930s, it was replaced with a multiple-span, art-deco open-spandrel concrete deck arch bridge, built in 1937. After years of degradation due to weather and traffic, the bridge was deemed unfit for use and closed in 2002. The 1937 bridge was part of the Scioto River Bridge Group, listed on the Columbus Register of Historic Properties in 1983 and proposed as part of the Columbus Civic Center Historic District, nominated to the National Register of Historic Places in 1988.

Wanting an iconic structure to replace the old bridge, the city of Columbus contracted Dr. Spiro Pollalis, professor of design technology and management at the Harvard University Graduate School of Design to design the bridge. His design, altered slightly for budget reasons, opened for traffic on July 30, 2010.

When the former bridge closed, engineers estimated that a replacement would cost approximately $19.5 million. However, by 2004, estimates climbed $29.5 million. When planners received construction bids in 2006, the lowest was $44.1 million. Cost overruns, design changes and inspections added another $10 million to the structure's final cost.

== Design ==
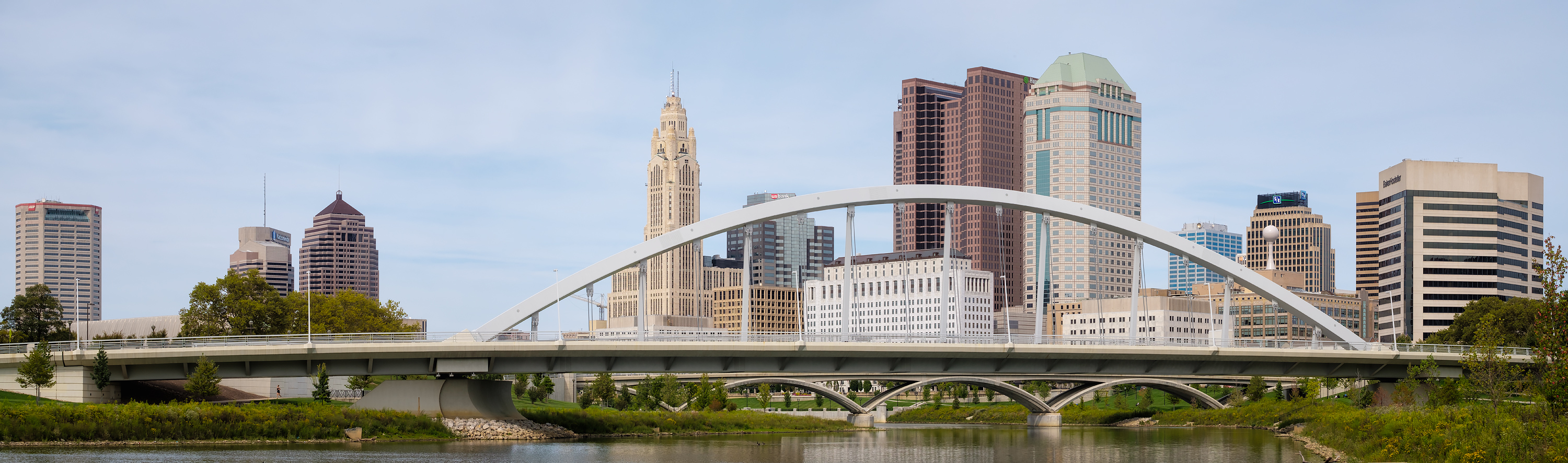
Side view of the bridge looking toward Columbus

=== Arch ===
The original concept of the Main Street bridge was far more complex and costly than the final design. Initially, the bridge called for a very shallow 10:1 span-to-rise ratio for the main arch, creating significant axial and bending forces. To accommodate the excess forces, the design called for expensive, high-strength concrete and steel to support the bridge. Because of the high cost of materials and construction of such a span, the design of the arch was revised to a 6.6:1 span-to-rise ratio, making the main arch taller and decreasing its length from 480 ft (150 m) to 400 ft (120 m). This design change was expected to allow for cheaper materials and save over 60,000 pounds (27,000 kg) of steel while keeping the ten-degree incline that makes the bridge unique.

=== Bridge deck ===
The bridge surface is composed of two separate decks, a 35 ft (11 m) wide vehicular deck carrying two lanes of eastbound traffic, one lane of westbound traffic, and a 18 ft (5.5 m) wide pedestrian deck on the opposite side of the arch from the vehicular deck and slightly elevated. While the redesign of the original concept altered the deck supports, the actual construction of the decks changed only slightly to accommodate the new design.

=== L-struts ===
The Main Street bridge also calls for thirteen L-struts, which would attach the arch to the bridge deck. Their original design used tapering geometries which were different for each strut. Creating, designing and testing thirteen distinct struts would have been cost-prohibitive, so engineers simplified the designs to reduce costs. While the aesthetics of the original design changed because of the more uniform strut design, they are similarly appealing and reduce the components' weight by over 400,000 lb (180,000 kg).

=== Piers ===
The final redesign of the Main street bridge was of the piers. The original design called for two 'V-piers', formed by the convergence of the main arch and the secondary arches on either side. This design proved to be nearly impossible to make structurally sound forcing engineers to simplify the piers. To do so they created a 'crescent pier' shape, which removes the two smaller arches on either end and creates a larger pier to provide better support.

== Gallery ==
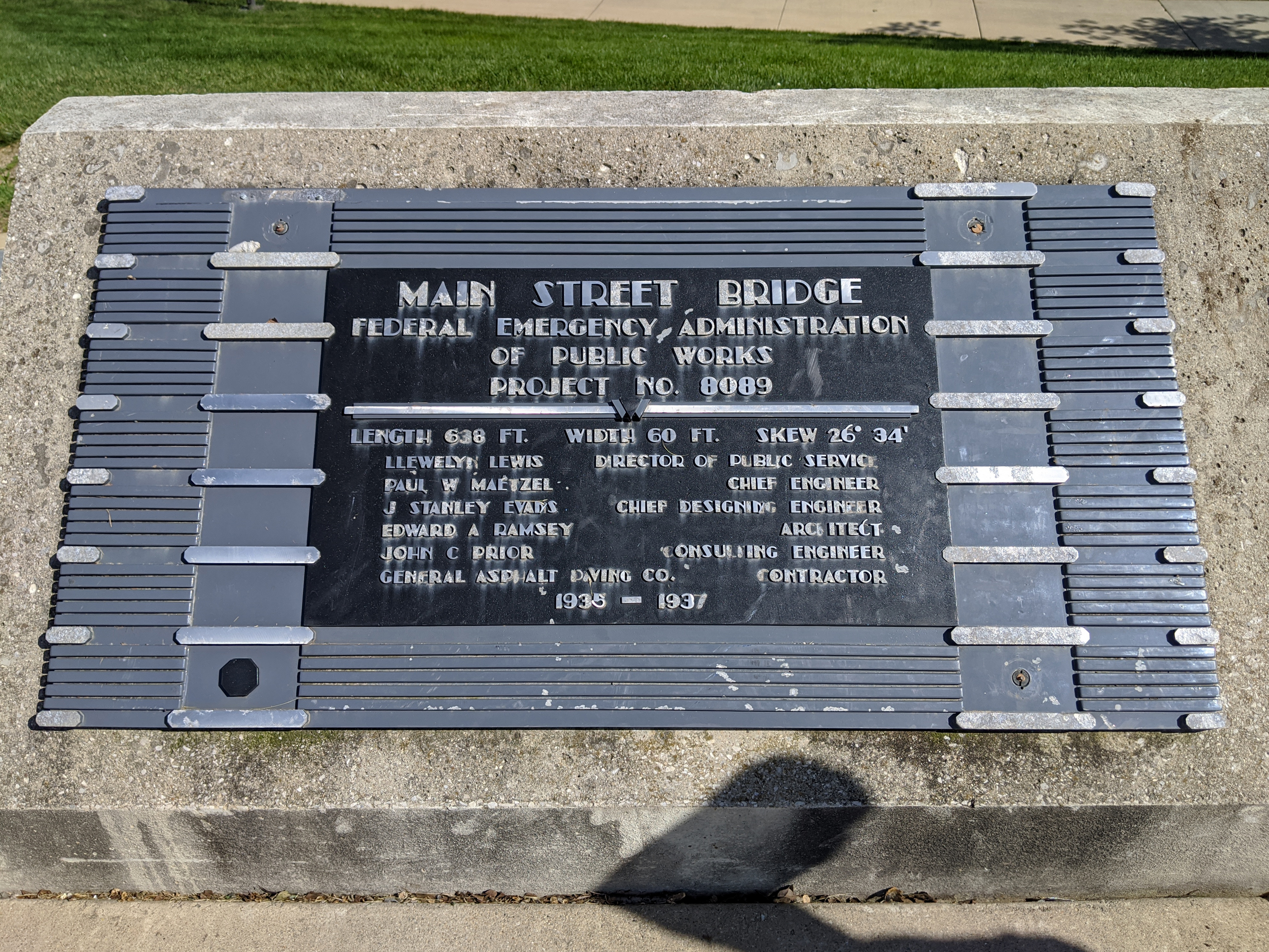
1937 bridge specifications plaque

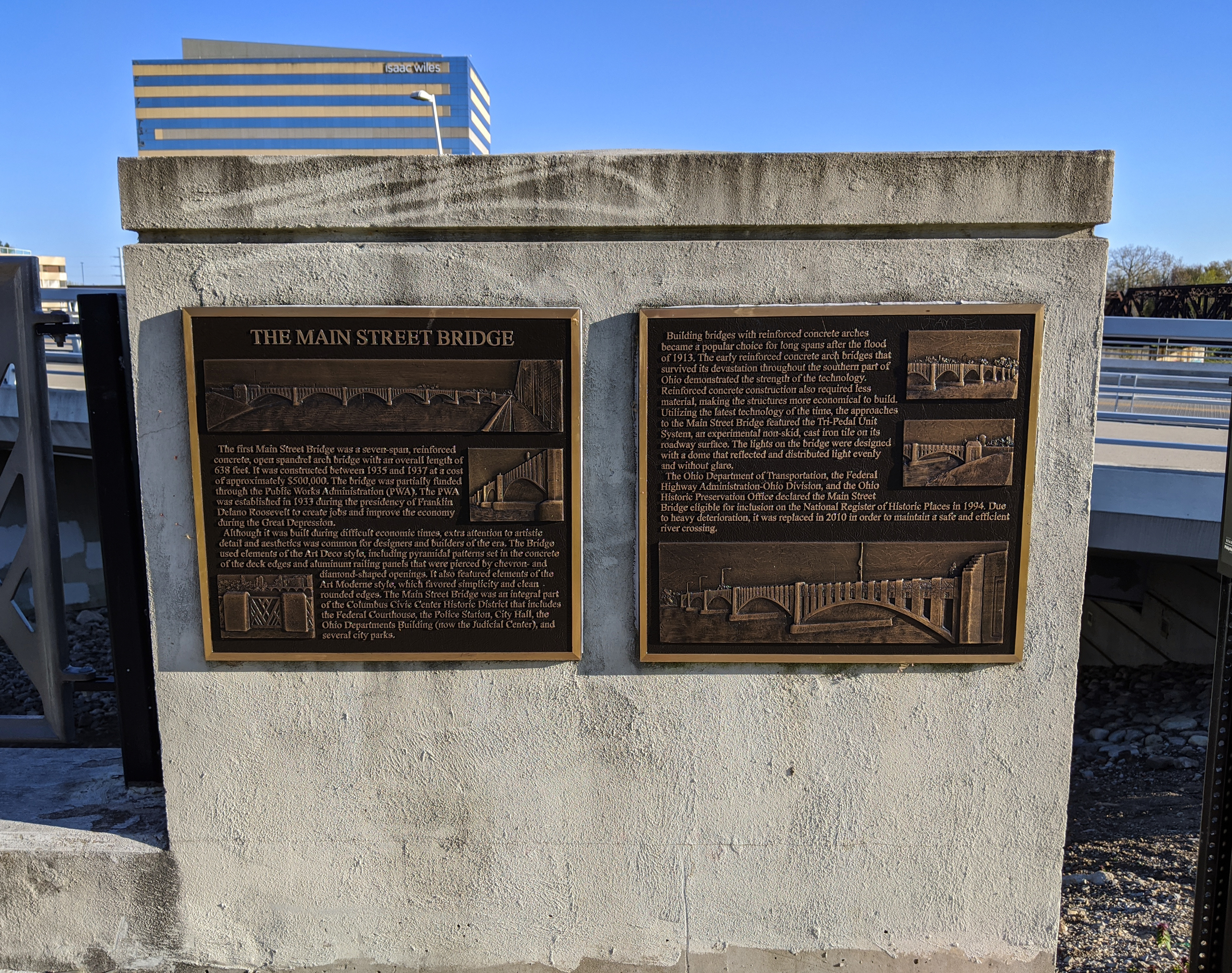
Historical plaques

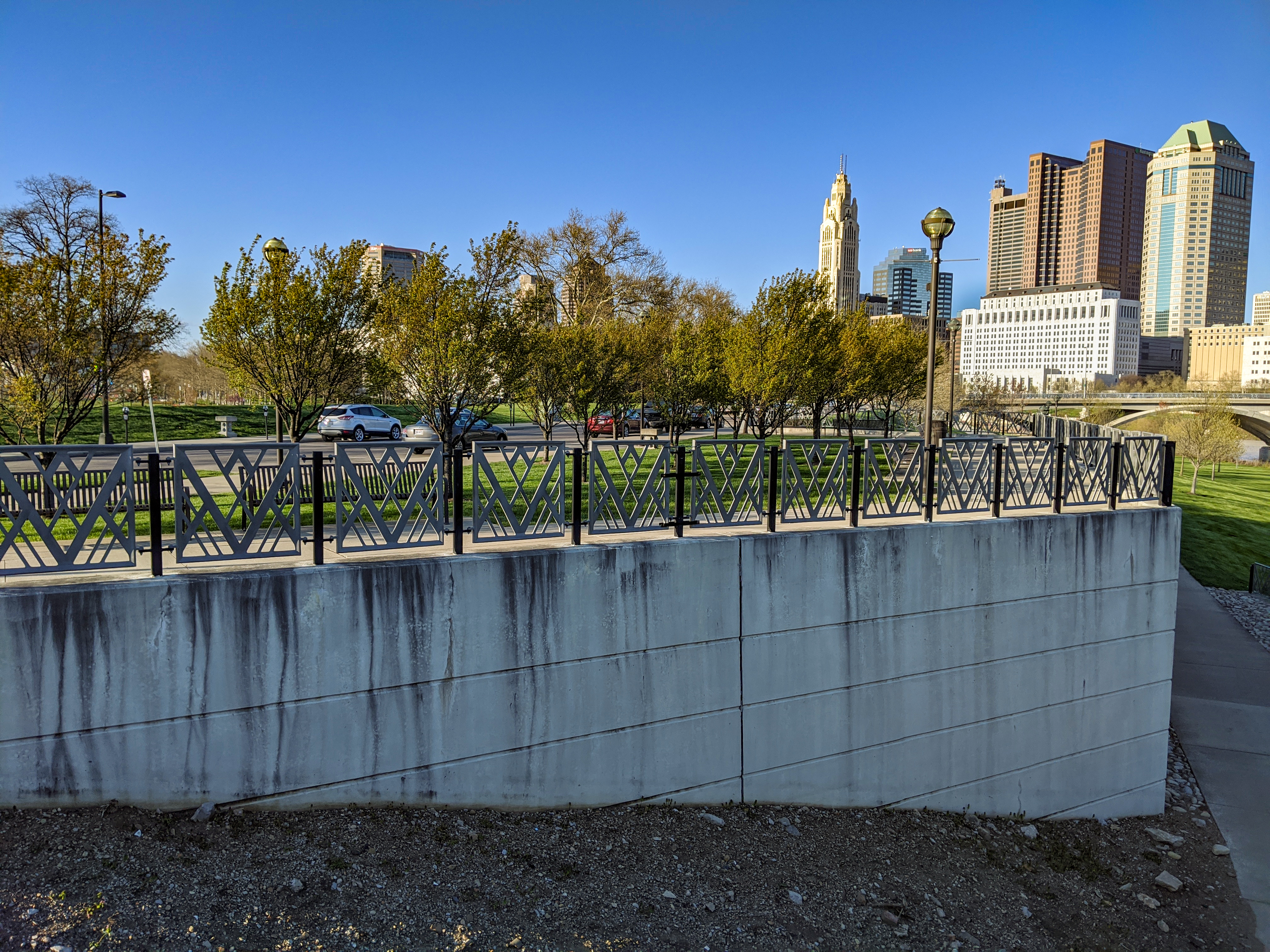
Railing from the original bridge

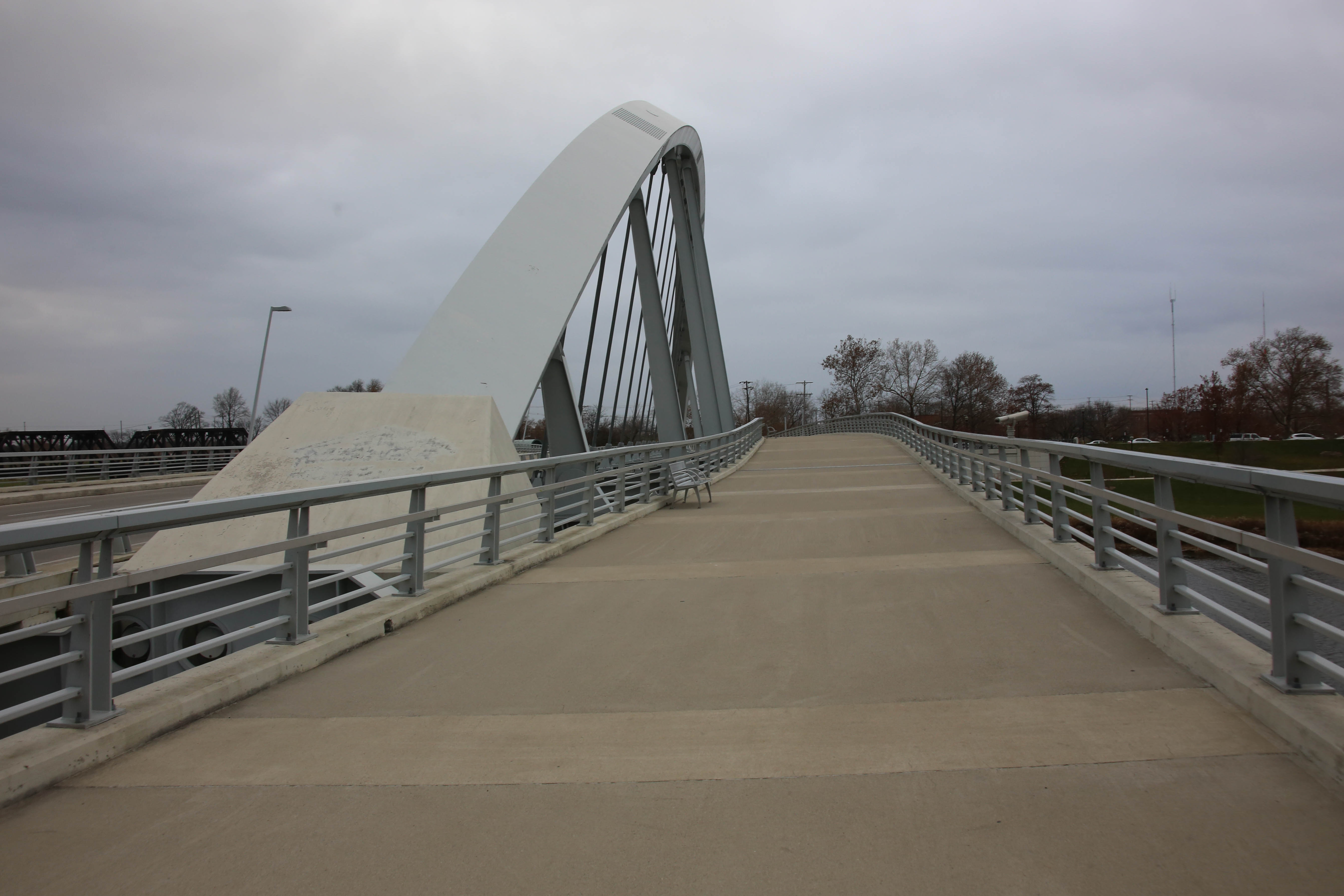
Pedestrian walkway

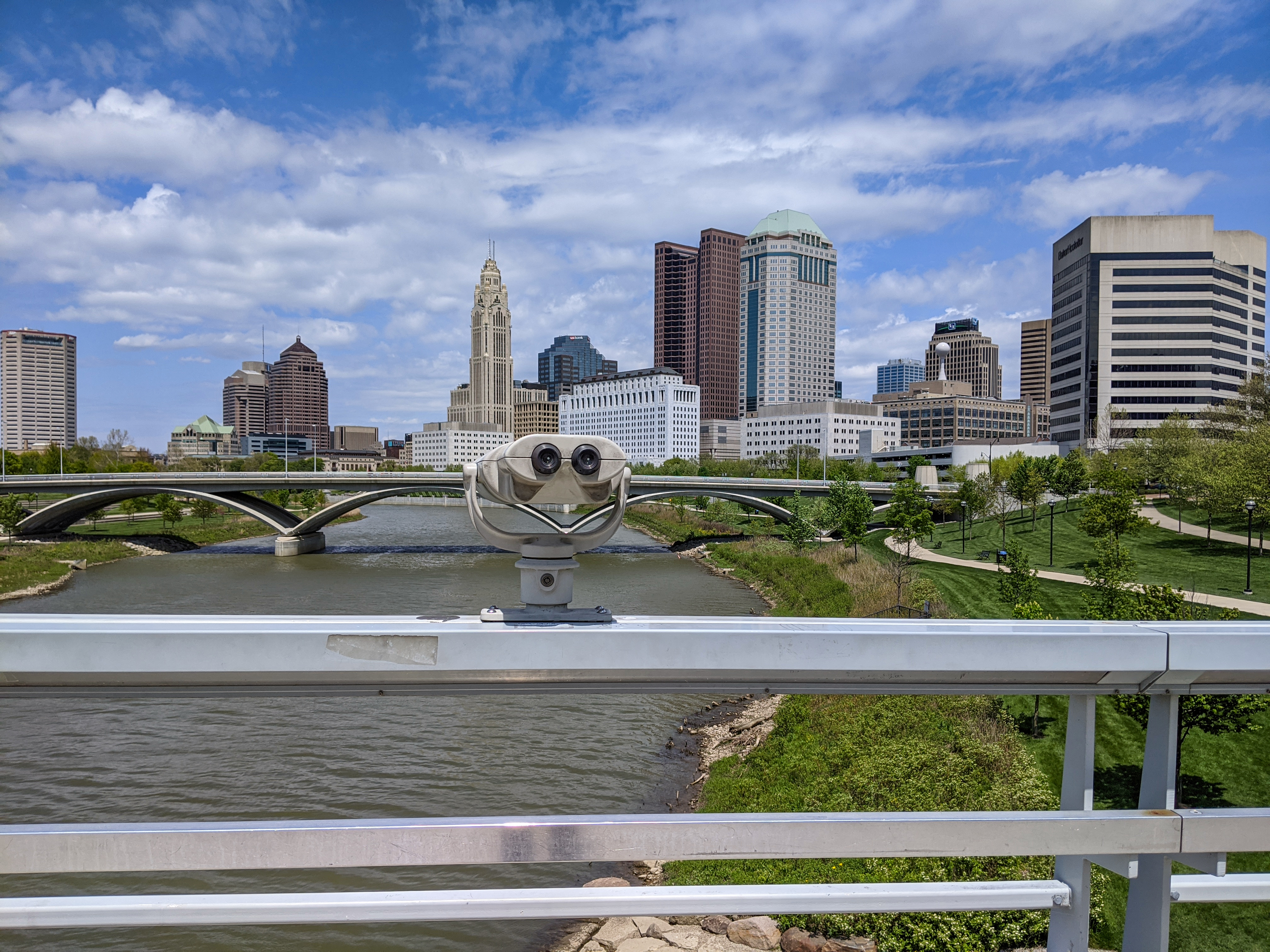
Binoculars for city viewing

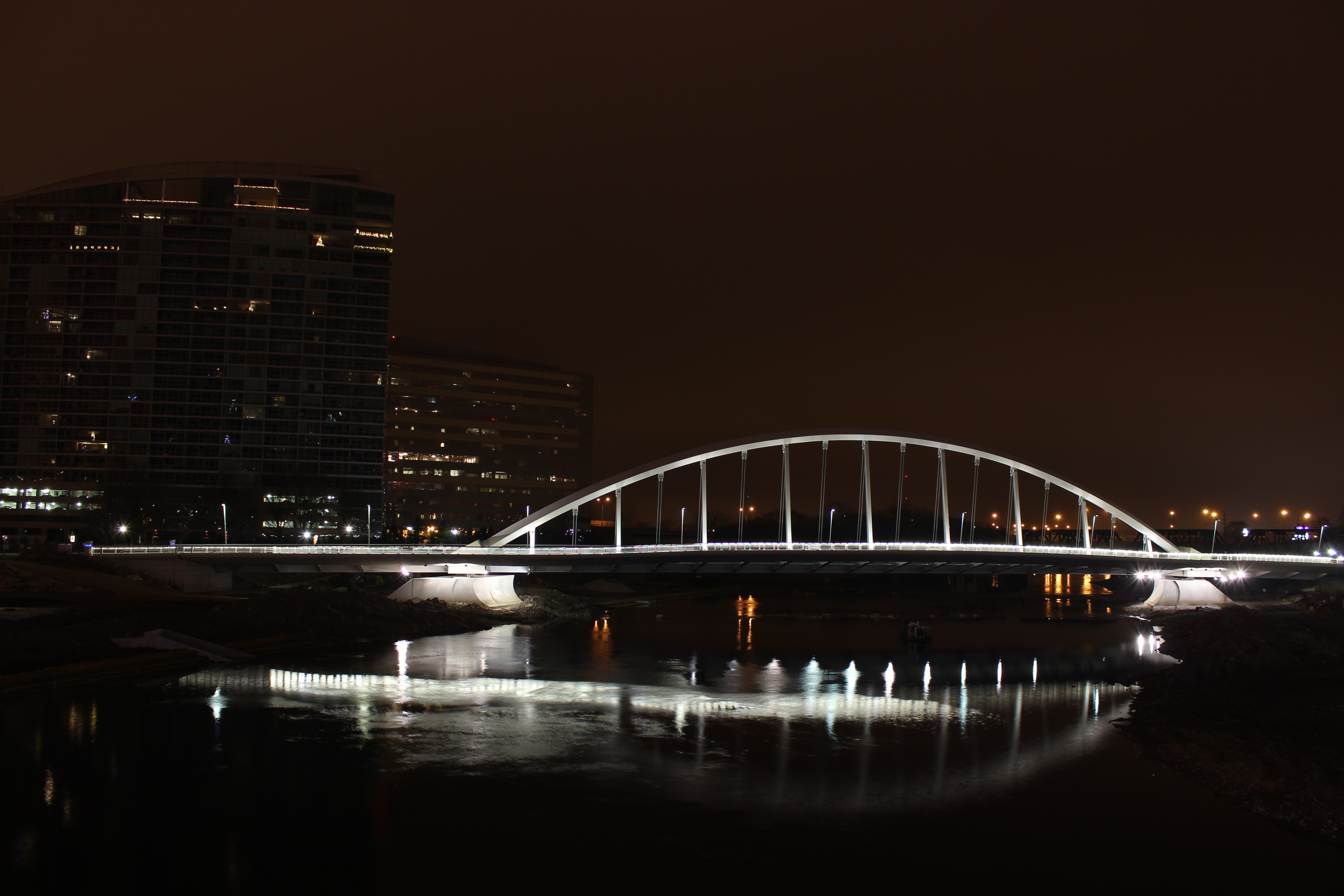
Nighttime lighting
