= Front Street office buildings =

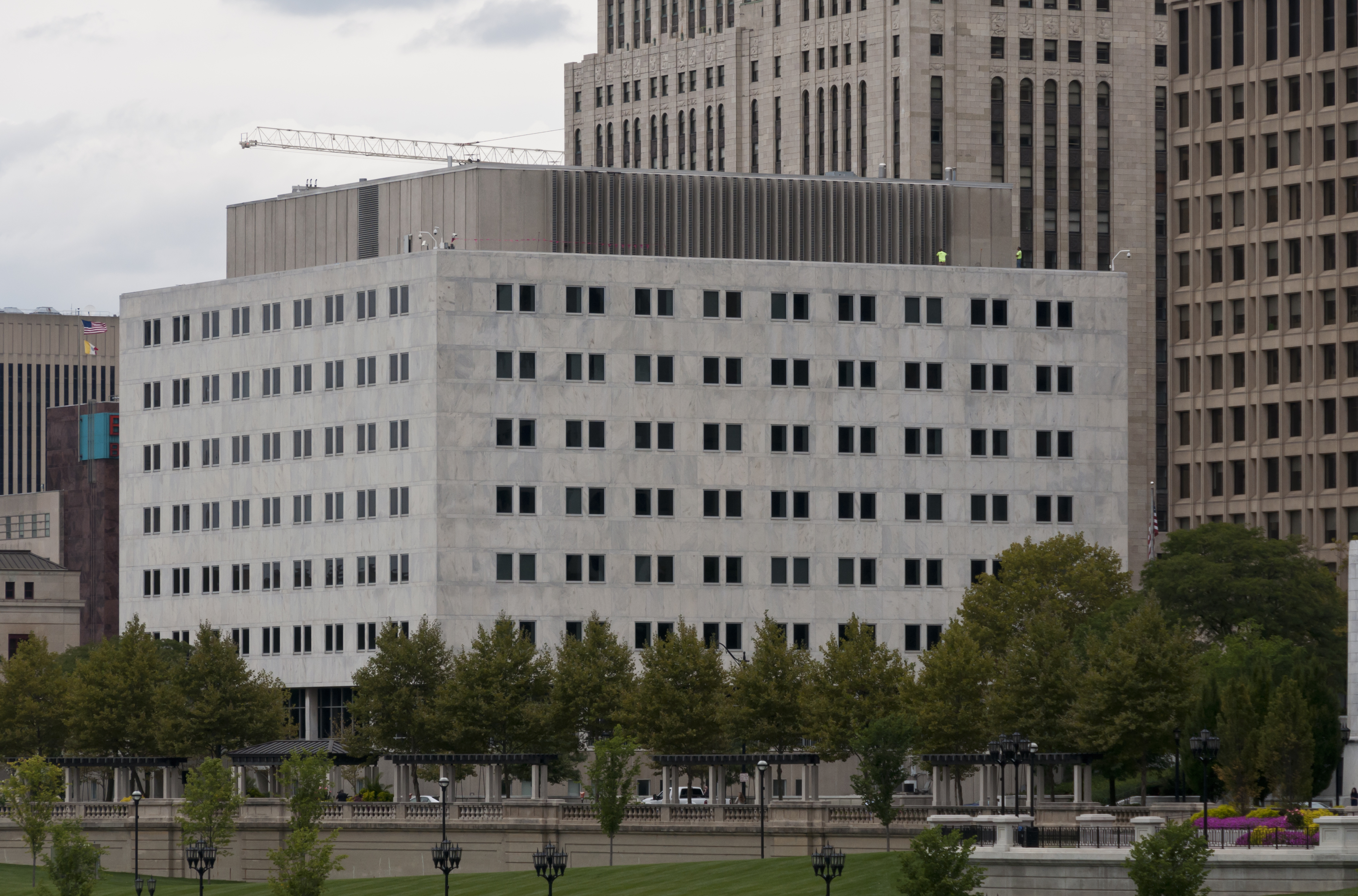
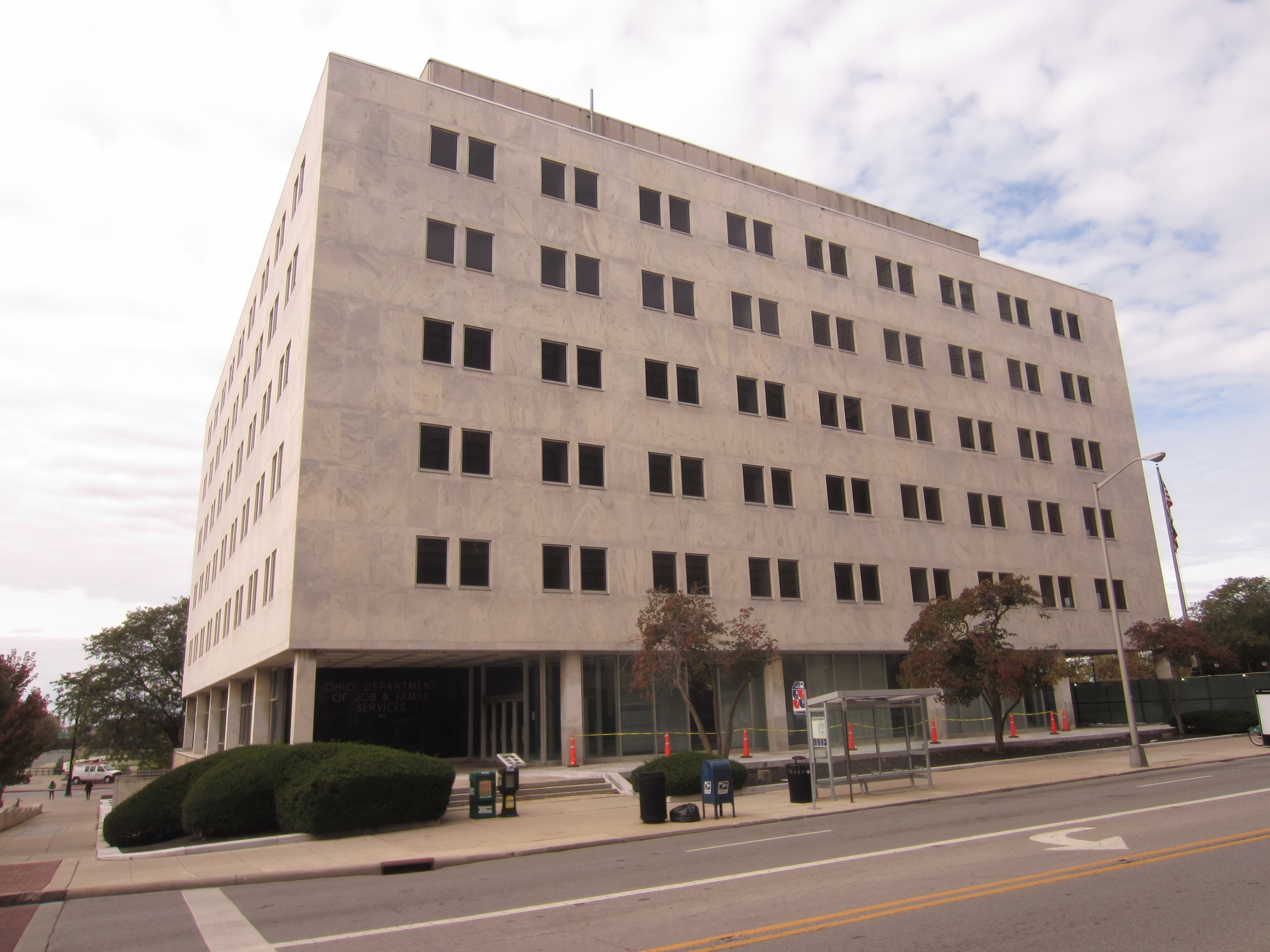
- 25 and 145 South Front Street
- Interactive map of the Front Street office buildings area

General information
- Location: 25 S. Front Street, 145 S. Front Street, Columbus, Ohio
- Coordinates: 39.961546°N 83.002843°W, 39.958903°N 83.002339°W
- Construction started: 1962
- Completed: 1964

25 South Front Street and 145 South Front Street are a pair of office buildings in Downtown Columbus, Ohio. The structures, built for state offices in the 1960s, are situated immediately north and south of the Ohio Judicial Center. The Ohio Department of Education occupies 25 South Front. 145 South Front Street has been vacant since 2006, though plans to create a mixed-use development in the building were announced in 2022.

== Attributes ==
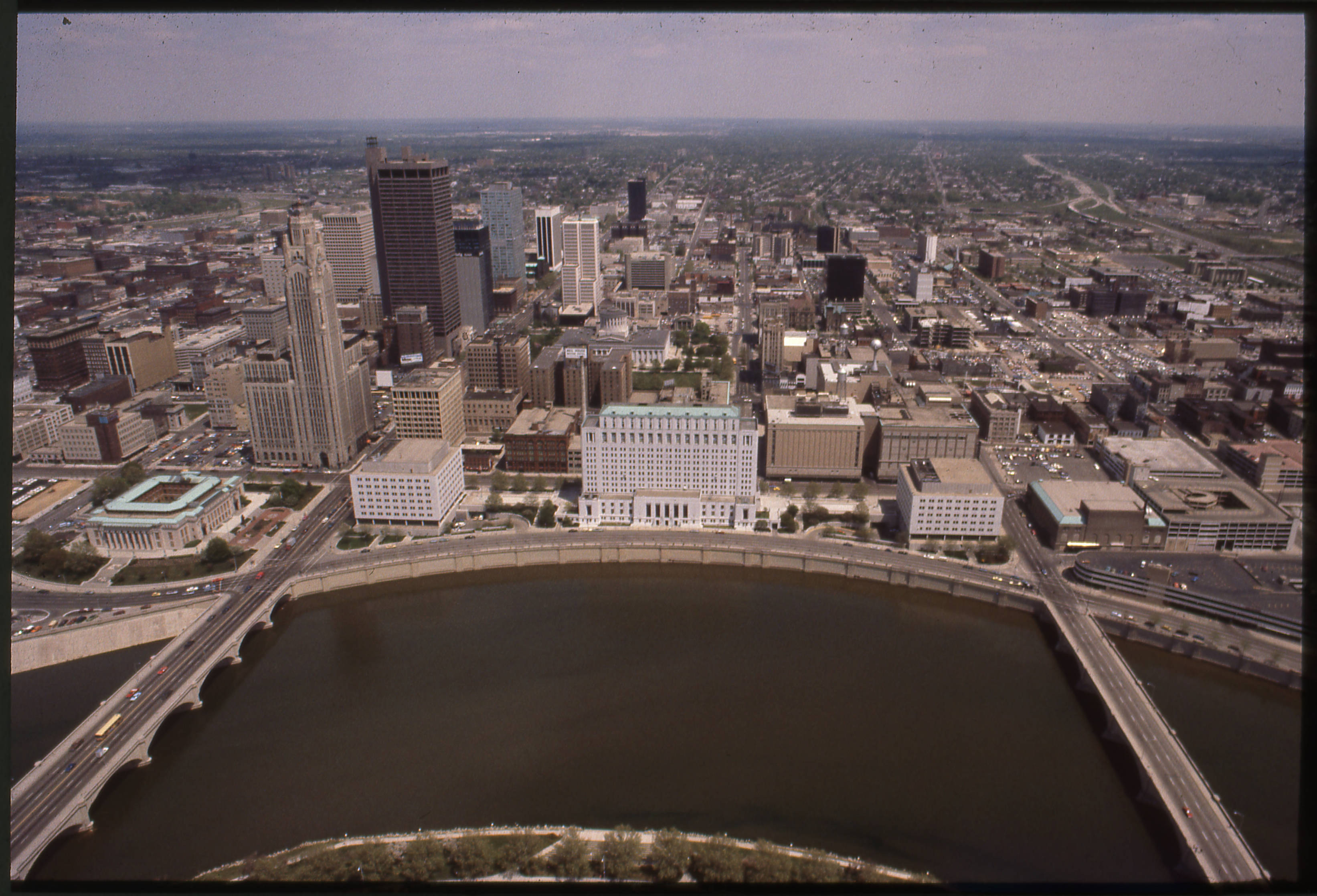
The pair of buildings in 1980

The two Front Street buildings were designed to look nearly identical, both with white Georgia marble facades, matching the marble exterior of the Ohio Judicial Center. The exteriors at the Front Street level and below have precast exposed aggregate concrete panels. Mechanical penthouses on the roofs contain air conditioning equipment. The center of the buildings house four elevators, stairs, restrooms, and service areas. The three buildings were built with connections via a pedestrian tunnel, and situated to retain landscaping between the three buildings, including flagpoles and reflecting pools.

145 South Front Street has six floors and 210,000 square feet (20,000 m^{2}). It was to be 154 feet square with underground parking for 50 cars. Architects for the building were Bellman, Gillett & Richards; Potter, Tyler, Martin & Roth; and Tully & Hobbs. At its opening, the building's amenities were noted, including air conditioning, steam-heated sidewalks, two cafeterias, a striking lobby of black granite, and a vivid exterior with bright white marble contrasting black limestone.

== History ==
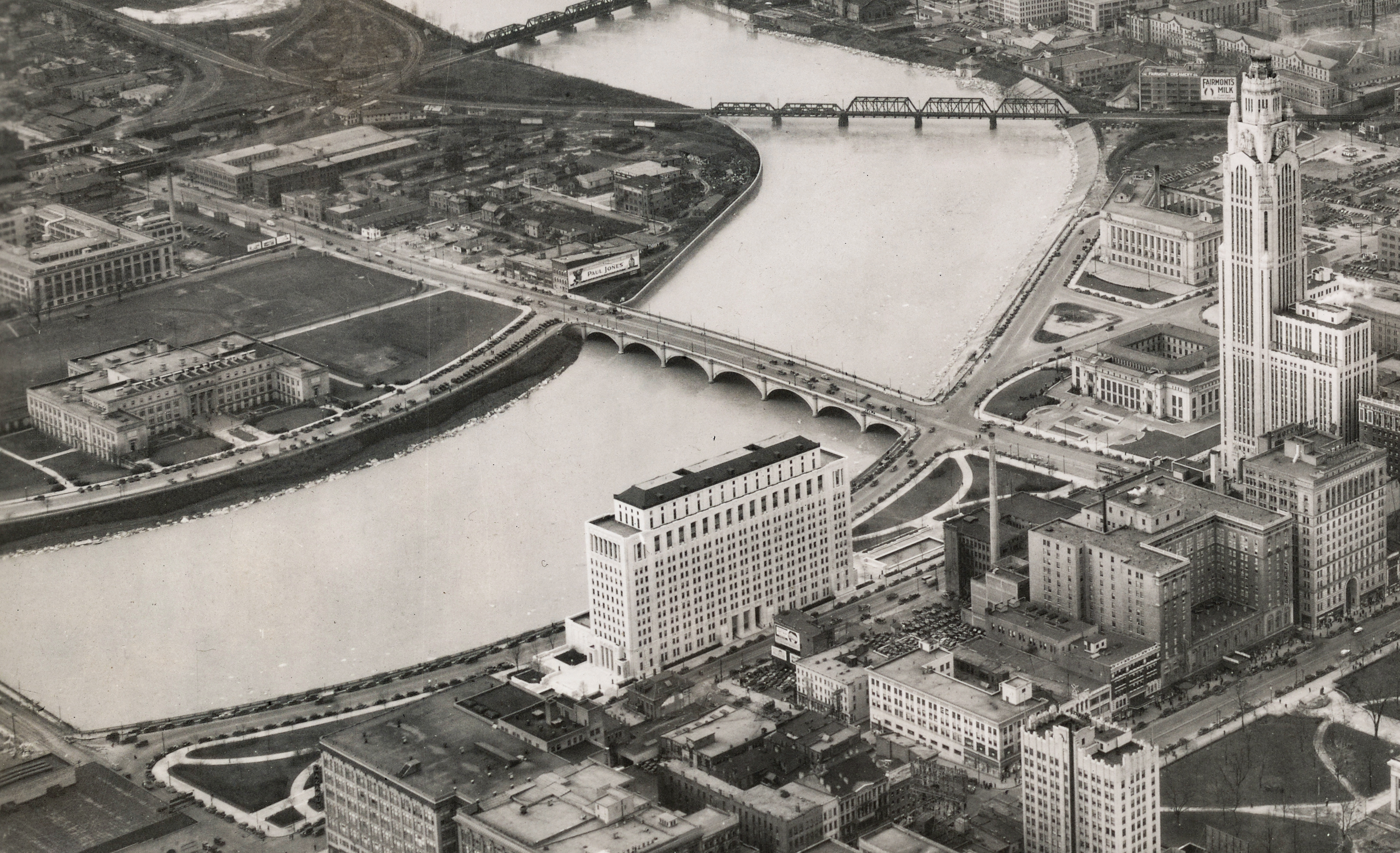
The site before construction, 1936

The land for the buildings was acquired by the State of Ohio in 1930. Construction on the Bureau of Unemployment Compensation (BUC) Building was to span from July 1962 to fall 1963, with work on the Department of Highways Building to begin three months later. The BUC Building officially opened in July 1964, while the Highway Building opened in November of that year.

During the highway building's construction, in July 1963, the department had deemed the space already inadequate to house all of its administrative personnel, and planned to occupy multiple buildings instead.

The buildings were included in the 1988 Columbus Civic Center Historic District, as noncontributing portions of the proposed historic district.

The Ohio Department of Highways, by then known as the Ohio Department of Transportation, moved out of 25 South Front Street in February 1998. By April of that year, the Ohio Department of Education was looking for a new headquarters, and eventually chose the building, which it still occupies today.

145 South Front Street later housed the Ohio Bureau of Employment Services, followed by the Ohio Department of Job and Family Services (ODJFS), until 2006. At that time, the department vacated the building to allow for a complete renovation, fixing multiple maintenance problems. The state expected the renovation would save tens of millions of dollars over any alternatives. The work however was halted in 2008, after $2.8 million was spent on design, demolition, and asbestos abatement; ODJFS blamed the overall cost, the federally-restricted use requirements, and found the economic downturn increased costs.

The 145 South Front Street building has laid vacant since 2006. It was first put up for sale in 2015. In 2019, the Columbus Partnership entered an agreement to purchase the building for $3 million. Renovation plans were announced in August 2022, to create a mixed-use project called The Civic (named for its governmental use and institutional design). The project would add 94 apartment units, 47,000 square feet of office space, a 4,000-square-foot café on the first floor, and a pool above an entrance to underground parking. The café is proposed to span from Front Street to Civic Center Drive, helping to activate the latter to pedestrians. In 2023, the project earned state historic preservation tax credits toward redevelopment.
