= Scioto River Bridge Group =

Historic bridges in Columbus, Ohio

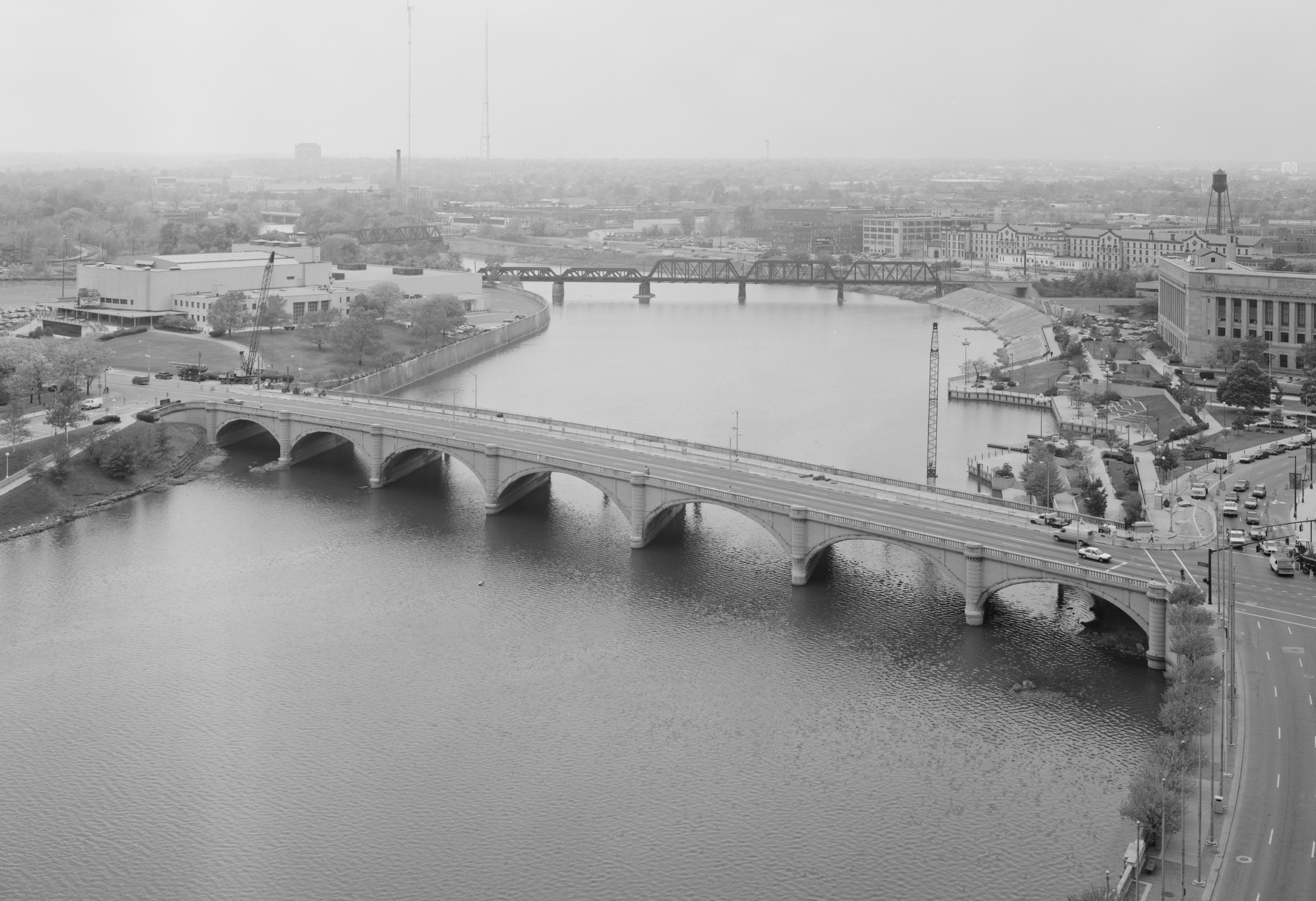
- Location: Columbus, Ohio

Columbus Register of Historic Properties
- Designated: October 10, 1983
- Reference no.: CR-22

The Scioto River Bridge Group was a set of historic bridges in Columbus, Ohio. The bridges were:

- The Broad Street Bridge, replaced by the Discovery Bridge
- The Main Street Bridge (1937-2002), replaced by the Main Street Bridge (2010–present)
- The Town Street Bridge, replaced by the Rich Street Bridge

The set of bridges was listed on the Columbus Register of Historic Properties in 1983. The bridges are also part of the Columbus Civic Center Historic District, deemed to be eligible for the National Register of Historic Places. The buildings were noted for their classical and Art Deco designs, and as part of the remade riverfront after the Great Flood of 1913.

== See also ==
- Scioto Mile
