= Scioto River =

Waterway in Ohio

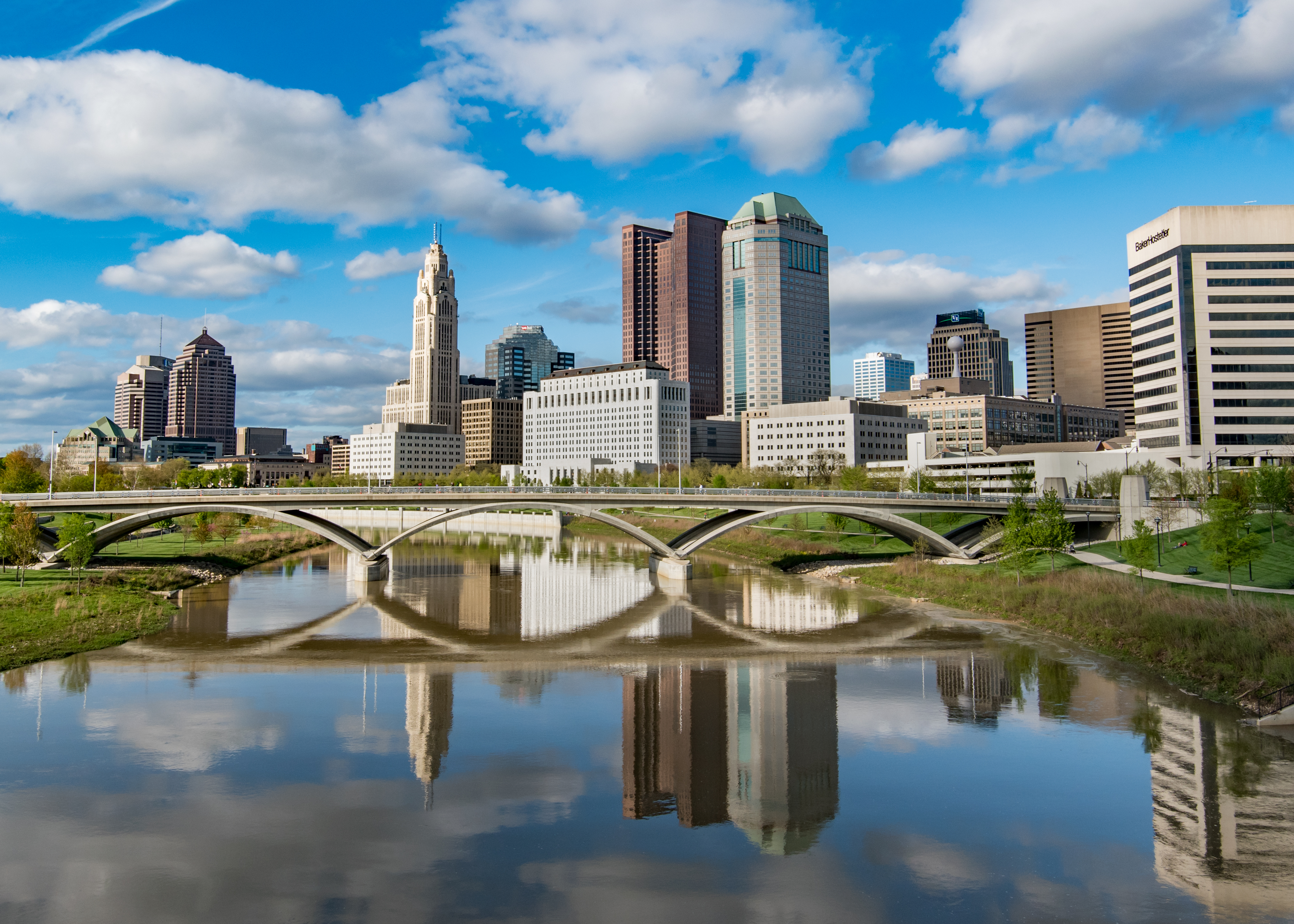
- The Scioto River in downtown Columbus

Location
- Country: United States
- State: Ohio
- Counties: Hardin, Marion, Delaware, Franklin, Pickaway, Ross, Pike, Scioto

Physical characteristics
- Source
  - location: Near Roundhead, Ohio
  - coordinates: 40°36′32″N 83°52′37″W
- Mouth
  - location: Ohio River near Portsmouth
  - coordinates: 38°43′50″N 83°00′46″W
  - elevation: 486 ft (148 m)
- Length: 231 mi (372 km)
- Basin size: 6,517 mi^{2} (16,880 km^{2})
- Discharge
  - average: 6,674 cu ft/s (189.0 m^{3}/s)

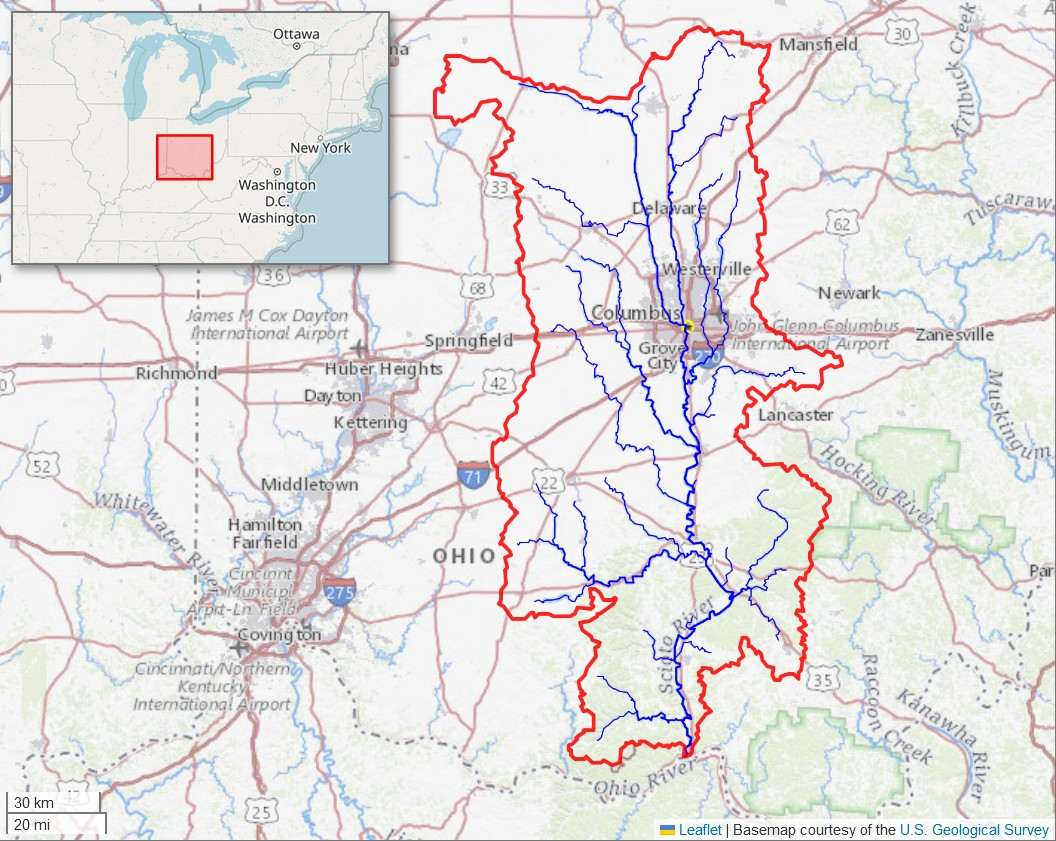
Map of the Scioto River watershed

The Scioto River (/saɪˈoʊtə/ sy-OH-tə) is a river in central and southern Ohio more than 231 miles (372 km) in length. It rises in Hardin County just north of Roundhead, flows through Columbus, where it collects its largest tributary, the Olentangy River, flows south into Appalachian Ohio, and meets the Ohio River at Portsmouth. Early settlers and Native Americans used the river for shipping, but it is too small for modern commercial craft. The primary economic importance for the river now is for recreation and drinking water. It is the longest river that is entirely within Ohio.

The Scioto River is represented on the Ohio state seal and coat of arms.

== Geography and geology ==
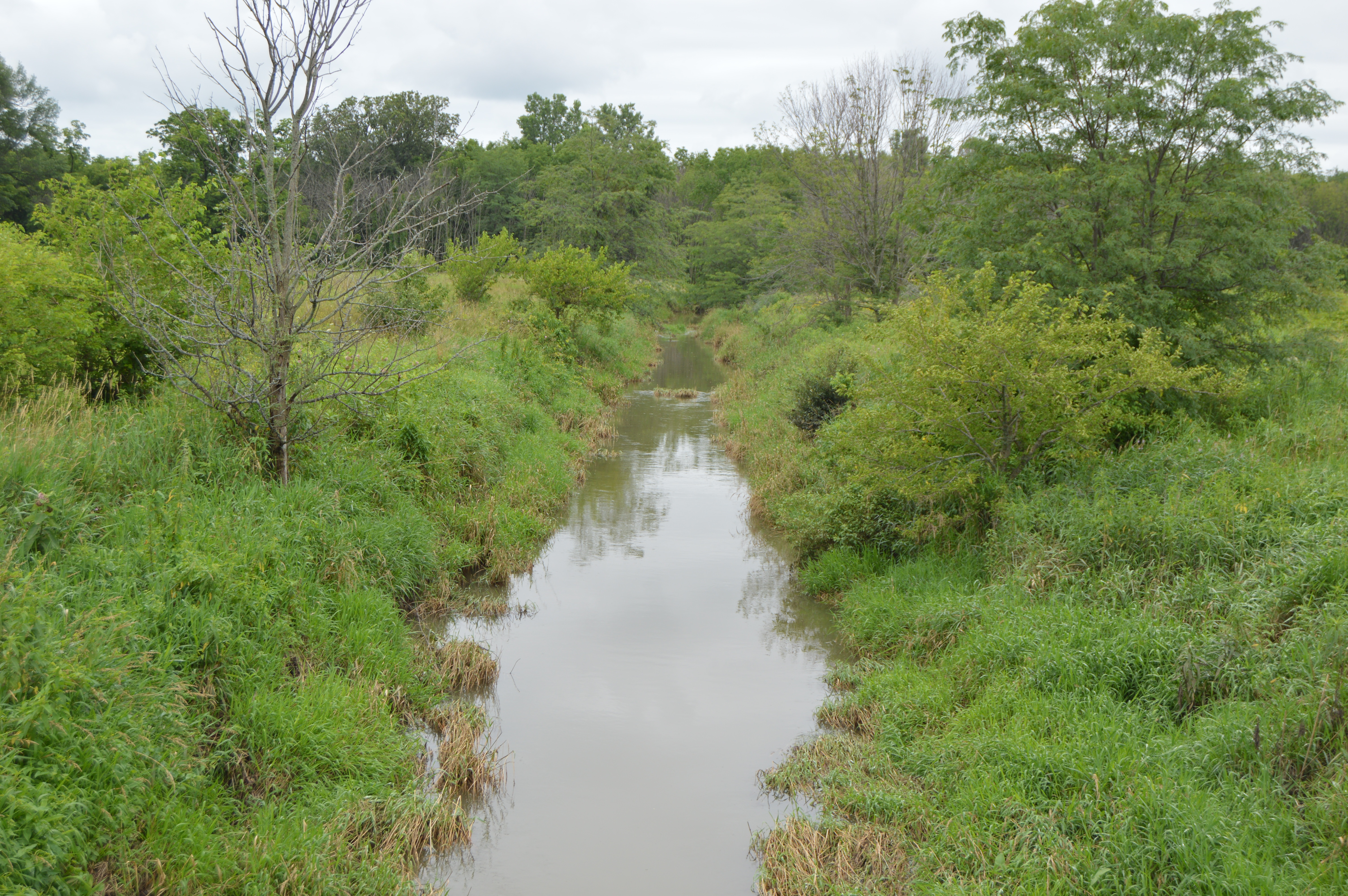
In western Hardin County, within one mile (1.6 km) of its source

The lower Scioto River valley is large compared to the width of the river and is extensively farmed. Meltwaters from retreating glaciers carved the valley exceptionally wide. Valley bottoms are smooth, and flood deposits created during and since the most recent Glacial period cause floodplain soils to be very productive. As a result, farms line much of the lower Scioto where it flows through low, rolling hills covered in hardwood trees.

The geologic history of the Scioto River is tied to the destruction of the Teays River network during the Ice Ages and consequent creation of the Ohio River. The north flowing Teays River was dammed by glaciers, and damming of other rivers led to a series of floods as lakes overflowed into adjacent valleys. Glacial Lake Tight is estimated to have been two-thirds the size of modern Lake Erie. Valleys beyond the reach of glaciers were reorganized to create the Ohio River, and the Scioto River replaced the Teays River. The Scioto River flows through segments of the Teays River valley but opposite the direction the Teays River flowed. In the cities of Columbus and Dublin, the river has cut a gorge in fossil-bearing Devonian limestone, and many tributary streams have waterfalls, such as Hayden Falls.

== History ==
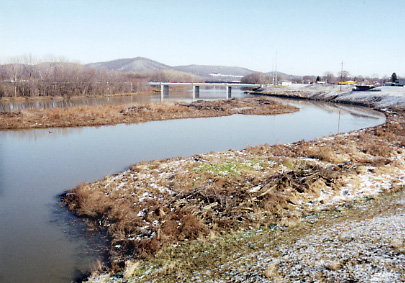
The Scioto River at Chillicothe

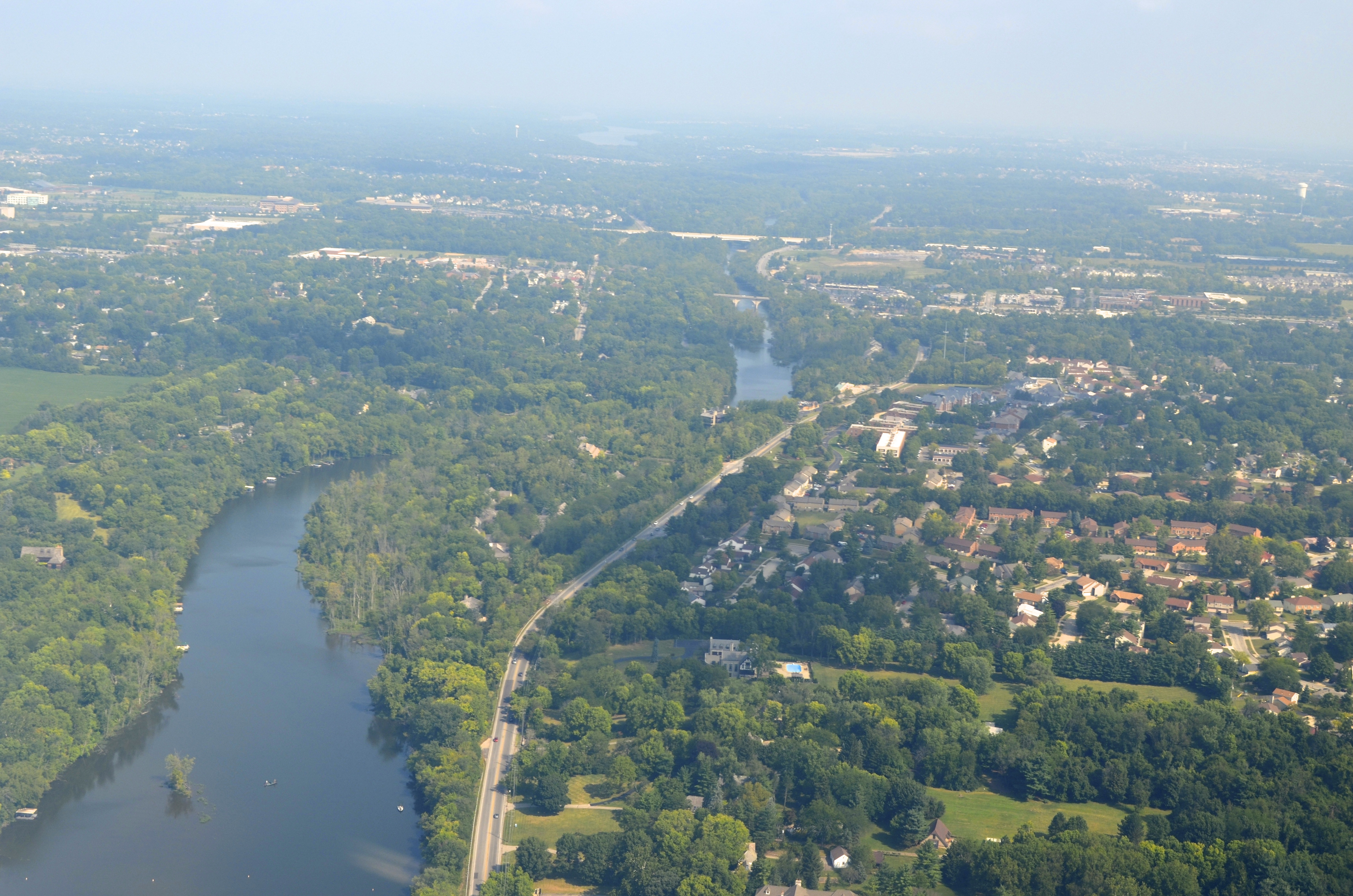
Scioto River in Columbus looking north toward Dublin

The Scioto River valley was home to many Native American cultures. The best known groups are the Mound Builders of the Hopewell tradition 2,000 years ago, the Adena tradition 3,000 years ago, and the later Fort Ancient culture about 1,000 years ago. Numerous Hopewell earthworks can be seen near Chillicothe at Hopewell Culture National Historic Park. The former strength of these cultures is demonstrated in settler accounts from as far east as Virginia. The name Scioto is derived from the Wyandot word skɛnǫ·tǫ’ 'deer' (compare Shenandoah, derived from the word for deer in another Iroquoian language).

During the antebellum years, the Scioto River provided a route to freedom for many slaves escaping from the South, as they continued north after crossing the Ohio River. Towns such as Chillicothe became important stops on the Underground Railroad.

A traditional fiddle tune in the Appalachian repertoire, "Big Scioty", takes its name from the river. The melody is attributed to the Hammons family of West Virginia.

In 2012, the river dropped to record- or near-record-low water levels as a result of the acute effects of the 2012 North American drought in Ohio.

== Dams and reservoirs ==
There are two major dams on the river. Griggs Dam in Columbus was built in 1904–1908 to impound a water supply for the city. Farther upstream, at Shawnee Hills, the O'Shaughnessy Dam was built in 1922–1925 creating a larger reservoir which was billed at the time as "the finest inland waterway in the United States". Both dams are operated by the city of Columbus.

The removal of the Main Street Dam in downtown Columbus, which was built in 1921, began in November 2013. The $35.5 million removal project was initially proposed in the 2010 Strategic Plan for downtown Columbus and was funded by a coalition of public and private entities. Prior to its demolition, the Main Street Dam impounded roughly 2.3 miles (3.7 km) of the Scioto River, artificially enlarging its width to an average of 500 feet (150 m) in downtown Columbus. Once completed, the Scioto Greenways project will reduce in width by nearly half, and expose 33 acres (13 ha) of land which will be reclaimed as parkland by the city. Riffles and pools will be restored to the river channel, returning it to its natural riparian state. Experts believe the restoration project will result in a healthier river and better habitat for native plant, fish, and mussel species.

== Cities and towns along the Scioto River ==
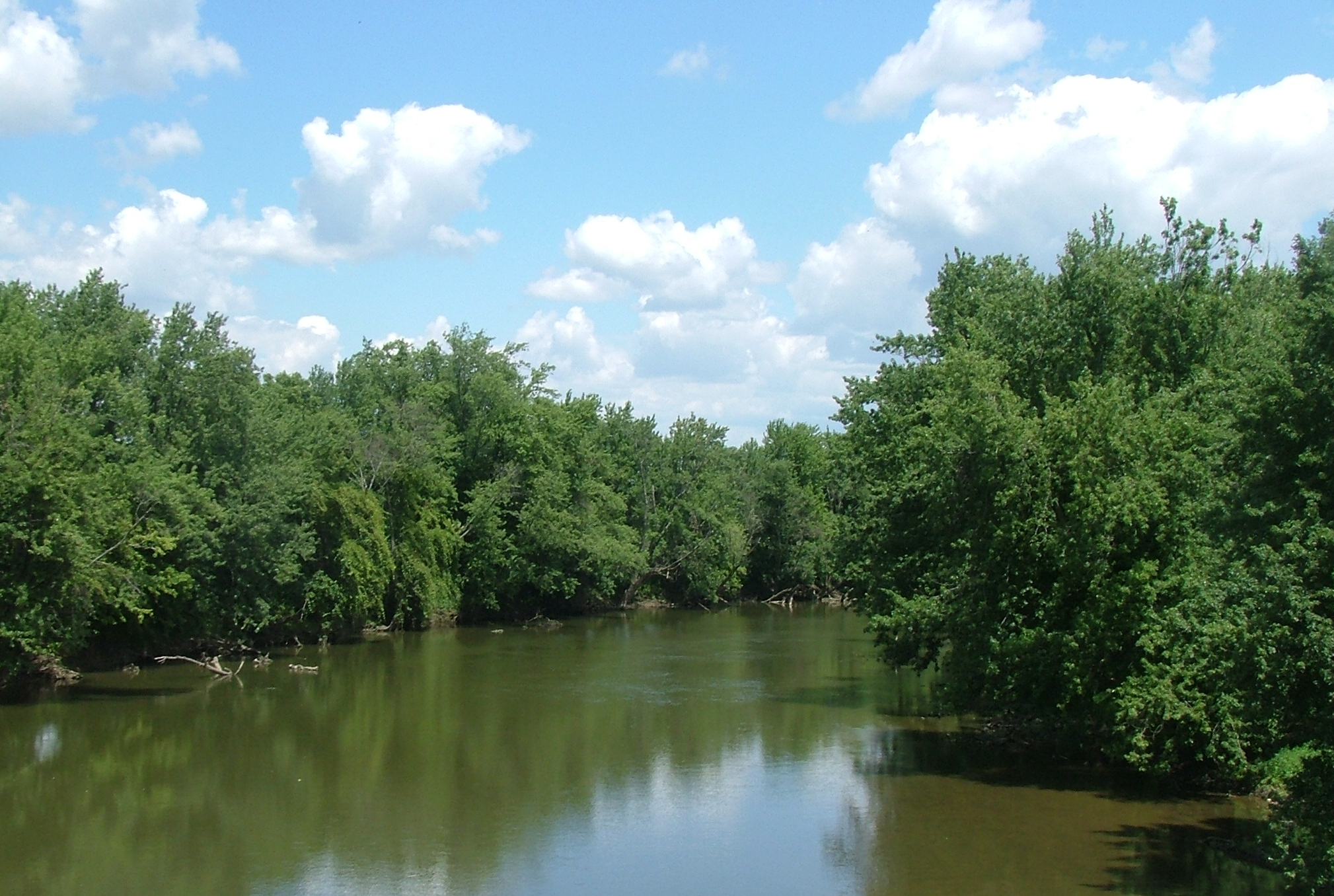
The Scioto River near South Bloomfield

Cities and towns, listed from upstream to downstream:

- Roundhead
- McGuffey
- Kenton
- Hepburn
- LaRue
- Green Camp
- Prospect
- Shawnee Hills
- Dublin
- Upper Arlington
- Grandview Heights
- Columbus
- South Bloomfield
- Circleville
- Chillicothe
- Waverly
- Piketon
- Lucasville
- Rosemount
- West Portsmouth
- Portsmouth

== Notable crossings ==
- Main Street Bridge
- Rich Street Bridge
- Discovery Bridge
- Dublin Link

== Variant names ==
According to the Geographic Names Information System, the Scioto River has also been known as:

- Big Sciota River
- Big Scioto River
- Chianotho River
- Great Siota River
- Menkwi Siipunk
- Riviere Chianouske
- Sci-ou-to
- Sciodoe Creek
- Sciota River
- Seeyotah River
- Sinhioto River
- Siothai River
- Sioto River

== See also ==
- List of rivers of Ohio
- Little Scioto River
