= Government of Columbus, Ohio =

City government

Government of the City of Columbus
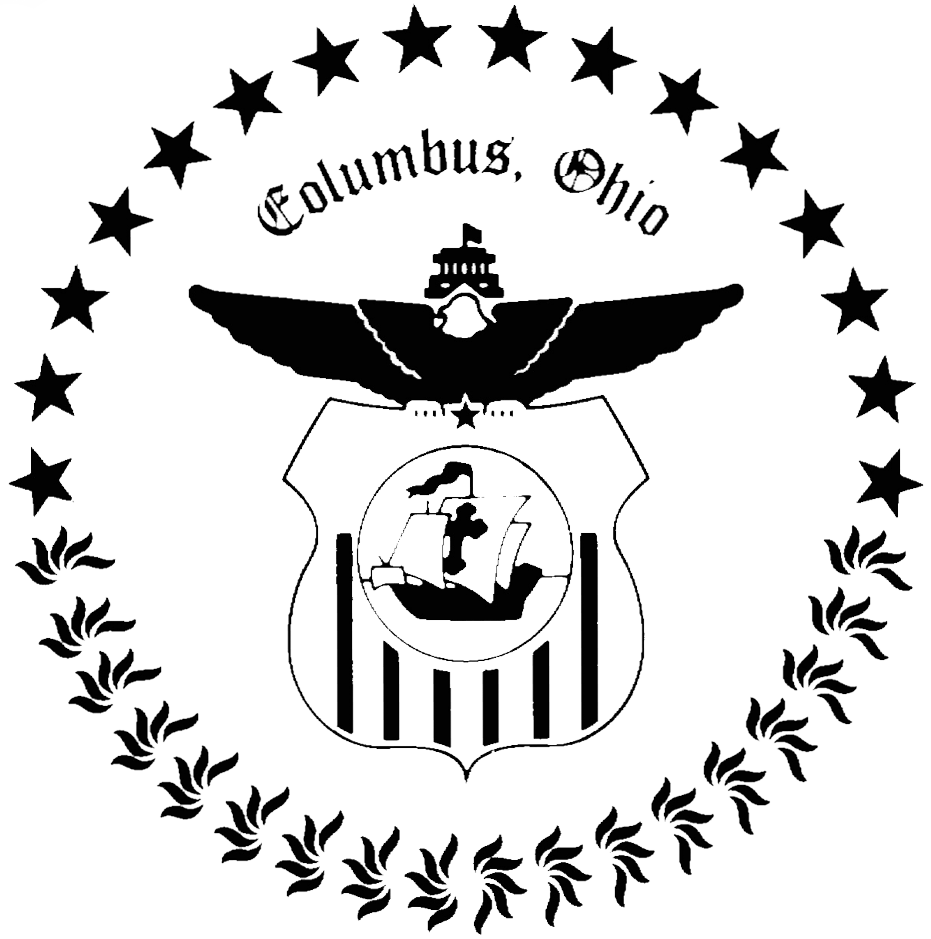
- Seal of Columbus, Ohio
- Formation: 1812; 213 years ago
- City charter: Columbus City Charter
- Website: www.columbus.gov

Legislative branch
- Legislature: Columbus City Council
- Meeting place: Columbus City Hall

Executive branch
- Mayor: Andrew Ginther (List of mayors)
- Appointed by: Election
- Headquarters: Columbus City Hall

The government of Columbus, Ohio, headquartered at Columbus City Hall in Downtown Columbus, is organized into a mayor-council system. The mayor is responsible for the administration of city government. The Columbus City Council is a unicameral body consisting of nine members elected or appointed at-large. The city has numerous government agencies, responsible for public education, health, and safety; emergency services; recreational facilities; sanitation; water supply; and welfare services.

The city government operates a campus of facilities at the downtown Columbus Civic Center, including the Michael B. Coleman Government Center, its 77 North Front St. offices, the Columbus Division of Police Headquarters, a city park, and a municipal parking garage.

== Mayor and city council ==
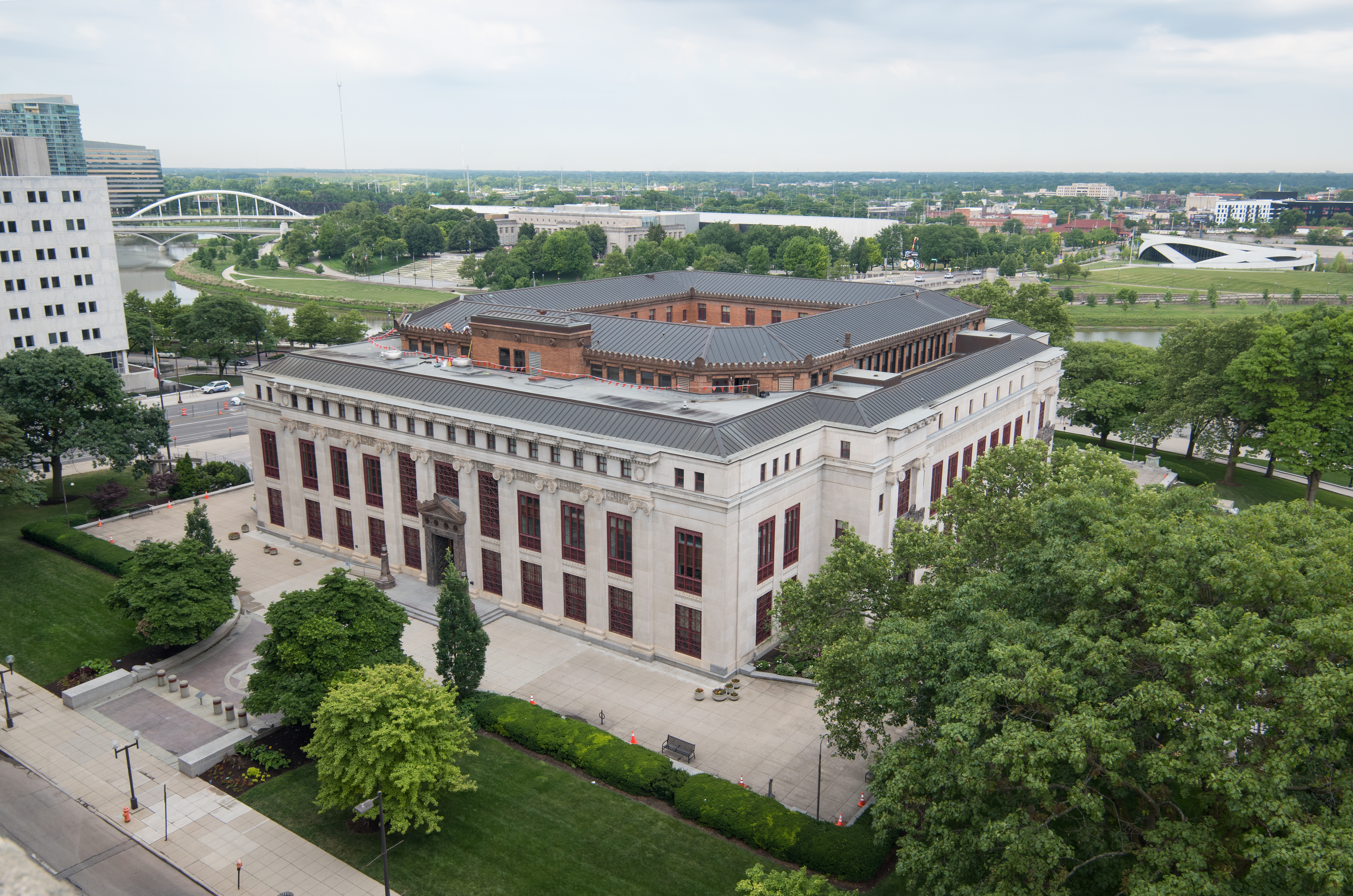
Columbus City Hall

The city is administered by a mayor and a nine-member unicameral council elected in two classes every two years to four-year terms at large. Columbus is the largest city in the United States that elects its city council at large as opposed to districts.

The village of Columbus was organized in 1816, four years after the city's founding, with a nine-member council and its first mayor, Jarvis Pike. Columbus became a city in 1834, and it was divided into three wards, each with four councilmembers. The current seven-member council was established in 1914; several proposals were rejected in subsequent decades to increase the number of seats as the city grew. Ward systems were proposed in 1968, 1975, 2012, and 2016. In 2018, city residents approved a new nine-member council, still voted in at-large, though with each councilmember representing a city ward. As of 2021, a districting commission is creating council districts for city representation.

The mayor appoints the director of safety and the director of public service. The people elect the auditor, municipal court clerk, municipal court judges, and city attorney. A charter commission, elected in 1913, submitted, in May 1914, a new charter offering a modified Federal form, with a number of progressive features, such as nonpartisan ballot, preferential voting, recall of elected officials, the referendum, and a small council elected at large. The charter was adopted, effective January 1, 1916. Andrew Ginther has been the mayor of Columbus since 2016.

== Government offices ==
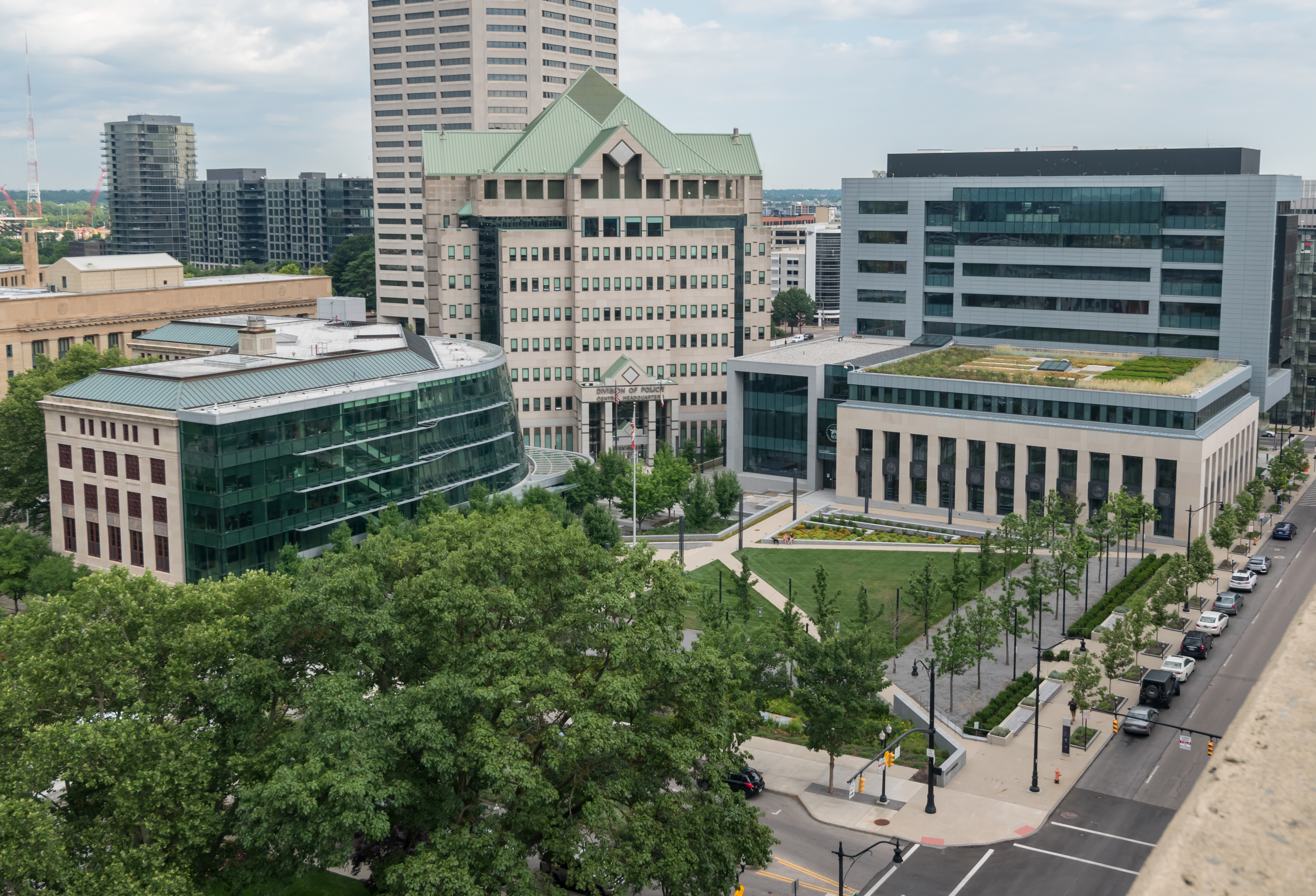
L-R: 77 N. Front St., CPD Headquarters, and the Coleman Government Center around the City Commons park

Columbus City Hall holds the offices and meeting spaces for the mayor and city council. The building was first completed in 1928, replacing the old City Hall on Capitol Square that stood as city hall from 1872 to 1921. Before 1872, the city government was based out of Central Market, a downtown market house and office building. The mayor and city council first met there in 1850; before then there was no official meeting space for the city government. The state constitution, rewritten in 1850, created more power and duties for city mayors, also creating a need for a more formal space. Lorenzo English was the first mayor to take on these duties and operate from this new City Hall.

City Hall makes up part of the Columbus Civic Center. The civic center also includes the Michael B. Coleman Government Center holds offices for the departments of building & zoning services, public service, development, and public utilities. Also nearby is 77 North Front St., which holds Columbus's city attorney office, income-tax division, public safety, human resources, civil service, and purchasing departments. The structure, built in 1930, was the police headquarters until 1991, and was then dormant until it was given a $34 million renovation from 2011 to 2013.

The civic center also includes the Columbus Division of Police Headquarters, a municipal parking structure, the City Commons park, and the Beacon Building, a former city office building now vacant and for sale. The civic center historic district also includes state and federal offices and courthouses.

== Emergency services ==
Municipal police duties are performed by the Columbus Division of Police, while fire protection and Emergency Medical Services is through the Columbus Division of Fire.

== Government departments and agencies ==
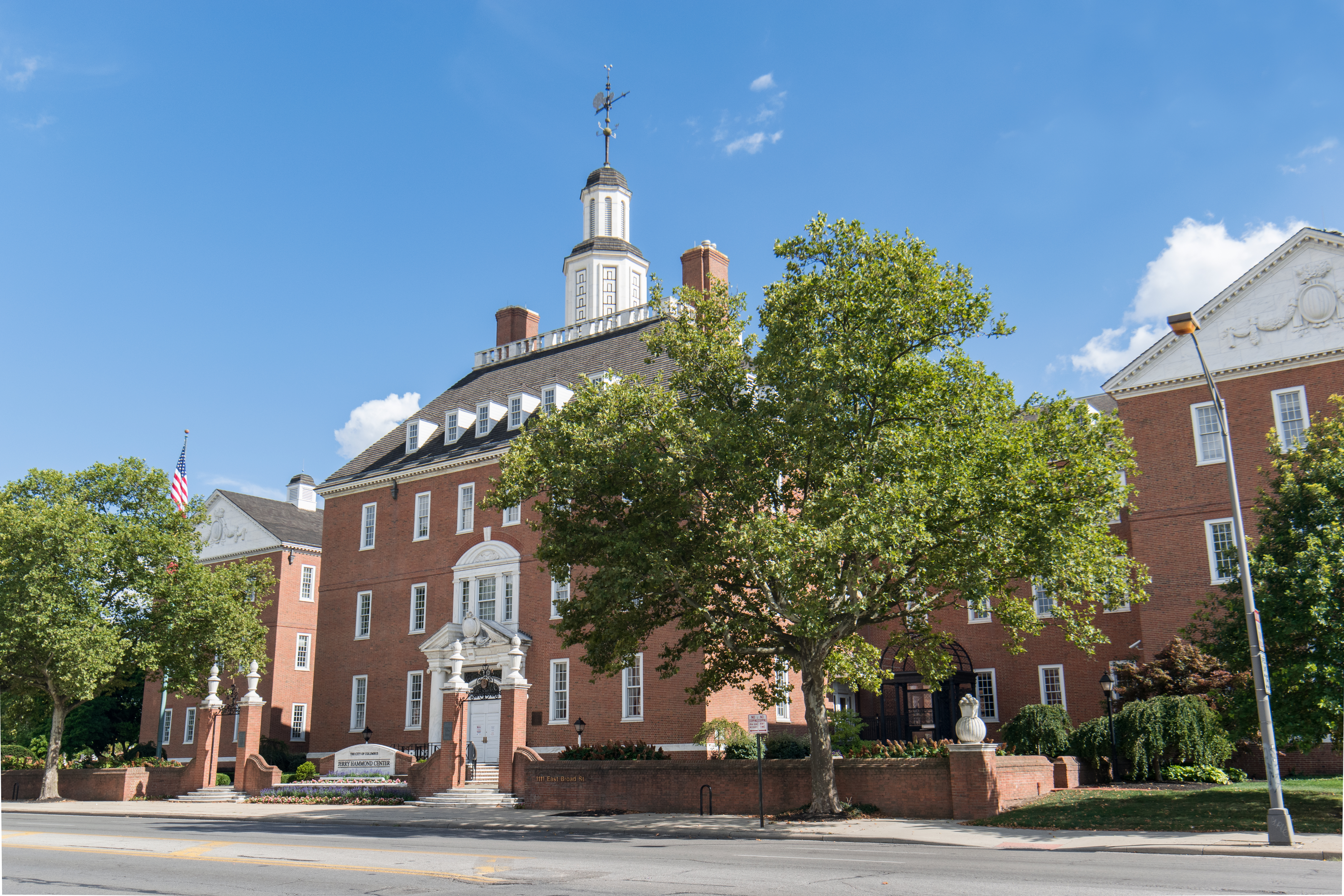
The Jerry Hammond Center, home to Columbus Recreation and Parks, the 311 call center, and the OhioMeansJobs Center

Departments include:

- Columbus Civil Service Commission
- Columbus Department of Building and Zoning Services
- Columbus Department of Development
- Columbus Department of Education
- Columbus Department of Finance and Management
- Columbus Department of Human Resources
- Columbus Department of Neighborhoods
- Columbus Department of Public Safety
- Columbus Department of Public Service
- Columbus Department of Public Utilities
- Columbus Department of Technology
- Columbus Division of Fire
- Columbus Division of Police
- Columbus Office of Diversity and Inclusion
- Columbus Public Health
- Columbus Recreation and Parks

City government agencies:

- Smart Columbus
- Greater Columbus Infant Mortality Task Force (Celebrate One)

Governmental agencies related to the city government, but operating independently, include:

- Central Ohio Transit Authority
- Columbus and Franklin County Metro Parks
- Columbus Metropolitan Library
- Solid Waste Authority of Central Ohio
