= 77 North Front Street =

City office building in Columbus, Ohio

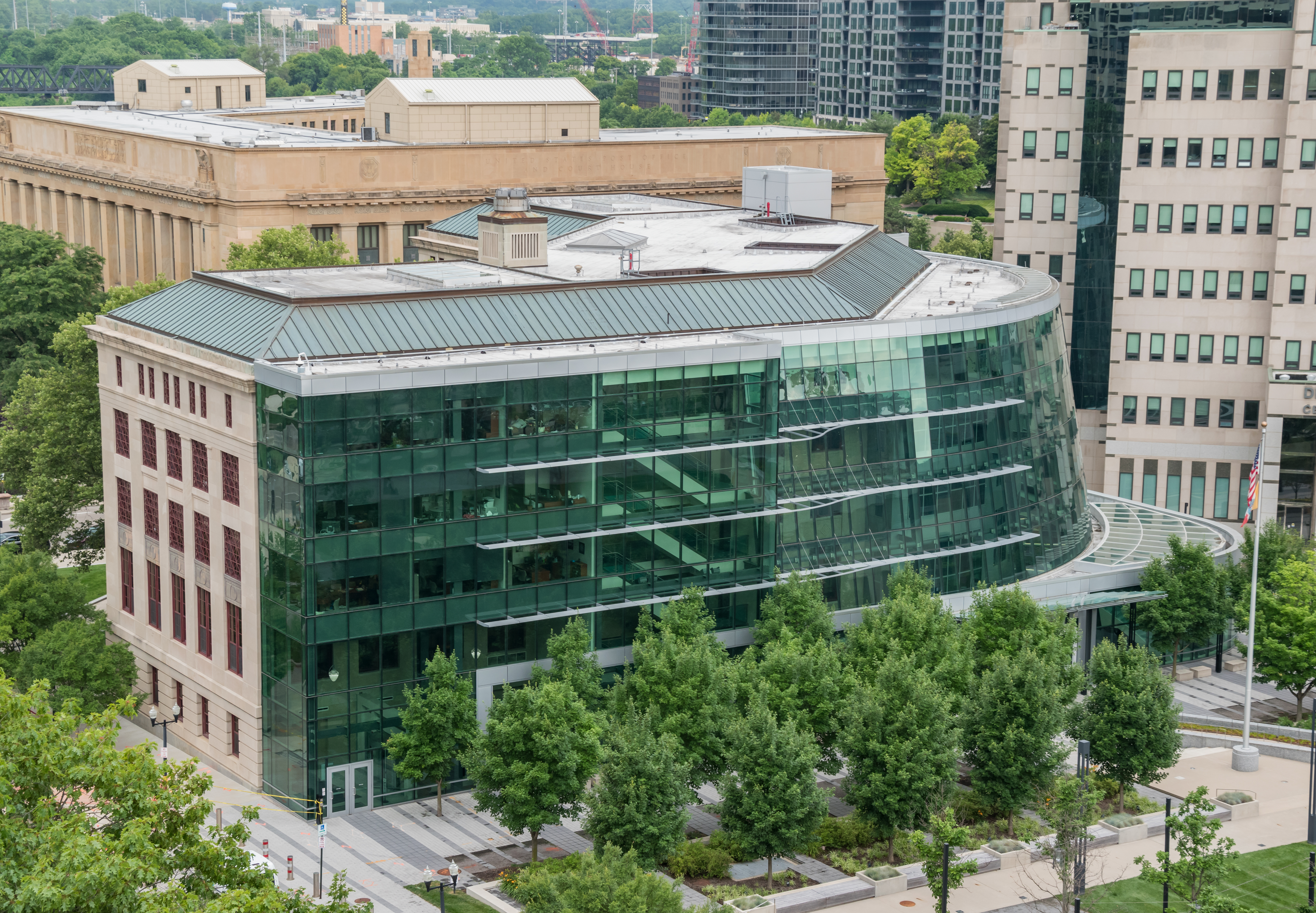
- Aerial view of the east and south facades
- Former names: Central Police Station, 120 West Gay Street

General information
- Architectural style: Second Renaissance Revival
- Location: 77 N. Front Street, Columbus, Ohio, United States
- Coordinates: 39.963702°N 83.003925°W
- Completed: 1930
- Renovated: 2011
- Owner: City of Columbus

Technical details
- Floor count: 5

Design and construction
- Architect: Allied Architects Association of Columbus

Other information
- Parking: Municipal garage

77 North Front Street is a municipal office building of Columbus, Ohio, in the city's downtown Civic Center. The building, originally built as the Central Police Station (of the current-day Columbus Division of Police) in 1930, operated in that function until 1991. After about two decades of vacancy, the structure was renovated for city agency use in 2011.

The building was included in the Columbus Civic Center Historic District, nominated to the National Register of Historic Places in 1988.

== Attributes ==
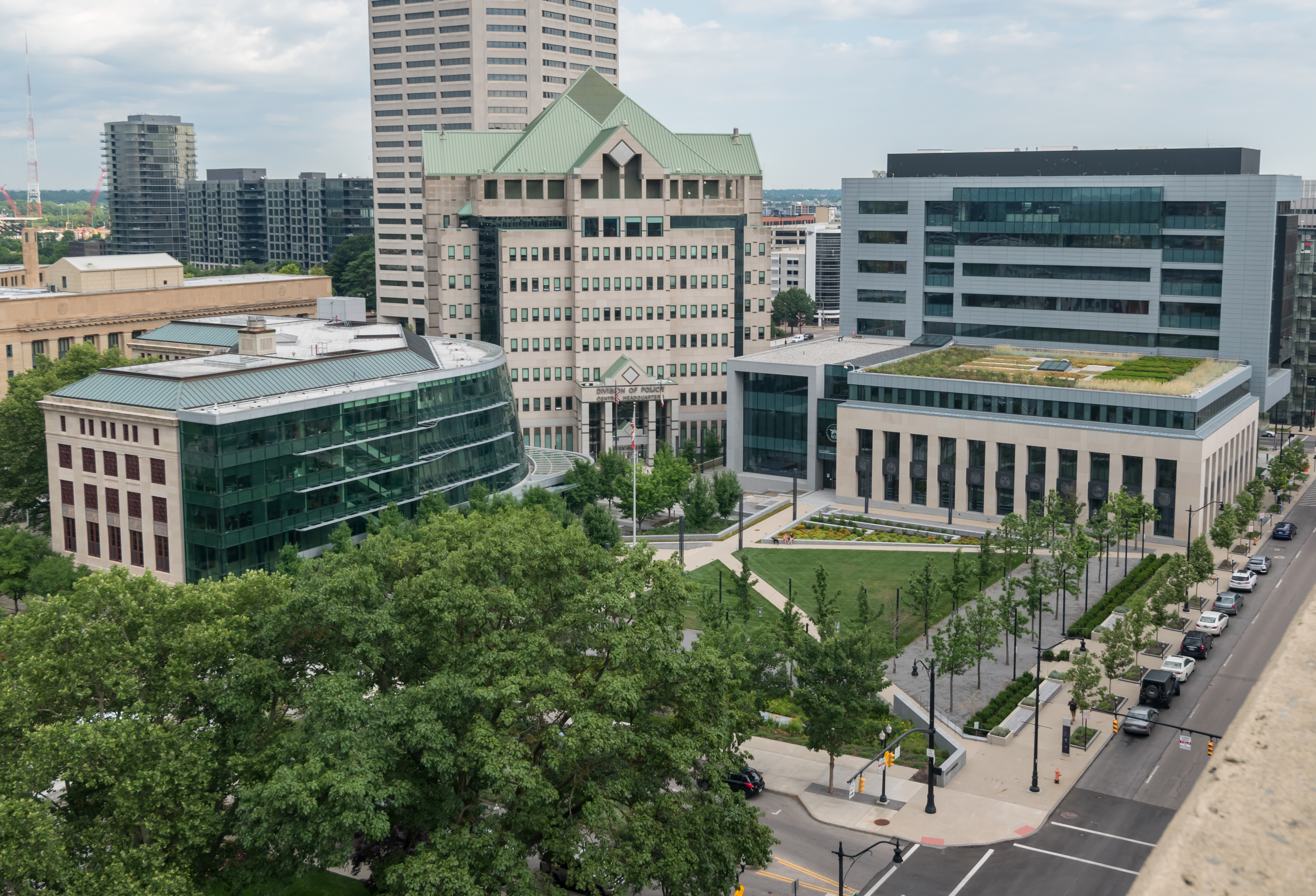
77 N. Front (left), among other municipal offices and the City Commons park

The original building was designed by the Allied Architects Association of Columbus in the Second Renaissance Revival style. In accordance with that style, the building has a rusticated first floor facade, a projecting cornice above the fifth floor, and unadorned floors between. The overall style was intended to match the neighboring Columbus City Hall and Joseph P. Kinneary United States Courthouse. It features a fine-grained limestone exterior with entrance steps of grey granite.

The L-shaped building has an original main entrance as a large central bay facing the southwest. The entranceway includes three sets of windows above the first-floor doorway. These windows are inset behind and flanked by smooth columns, themselves flanked by square pilasters. The entablature above includes a frieze reading "Dedicated to justice for all in the firm belief that obedience to law is freedom".

The building has been certified LEED Gold since 2013, following its 2011 renovation.

=== Interior ===
The building's interior has seen many uses. In 1979, police uses included a lost property room in the basement; the first floor held the general information room, patrol bureau office, traffic bureau, and accident investigation office. The second floor held the Franklin County Municipal Clerk of Courts office and the records office. The juvenile bureau was located on the fourth floor.

The interior features a large mural, painted in 1966 by patrolman William Needles. It is located in the building's first floor hallway, and measures 16 ft × 4 ft (4.9 m × 1.2 m). It depicts the police department's history, including portraits of notable chiefs.

=== Lion sculptures ===
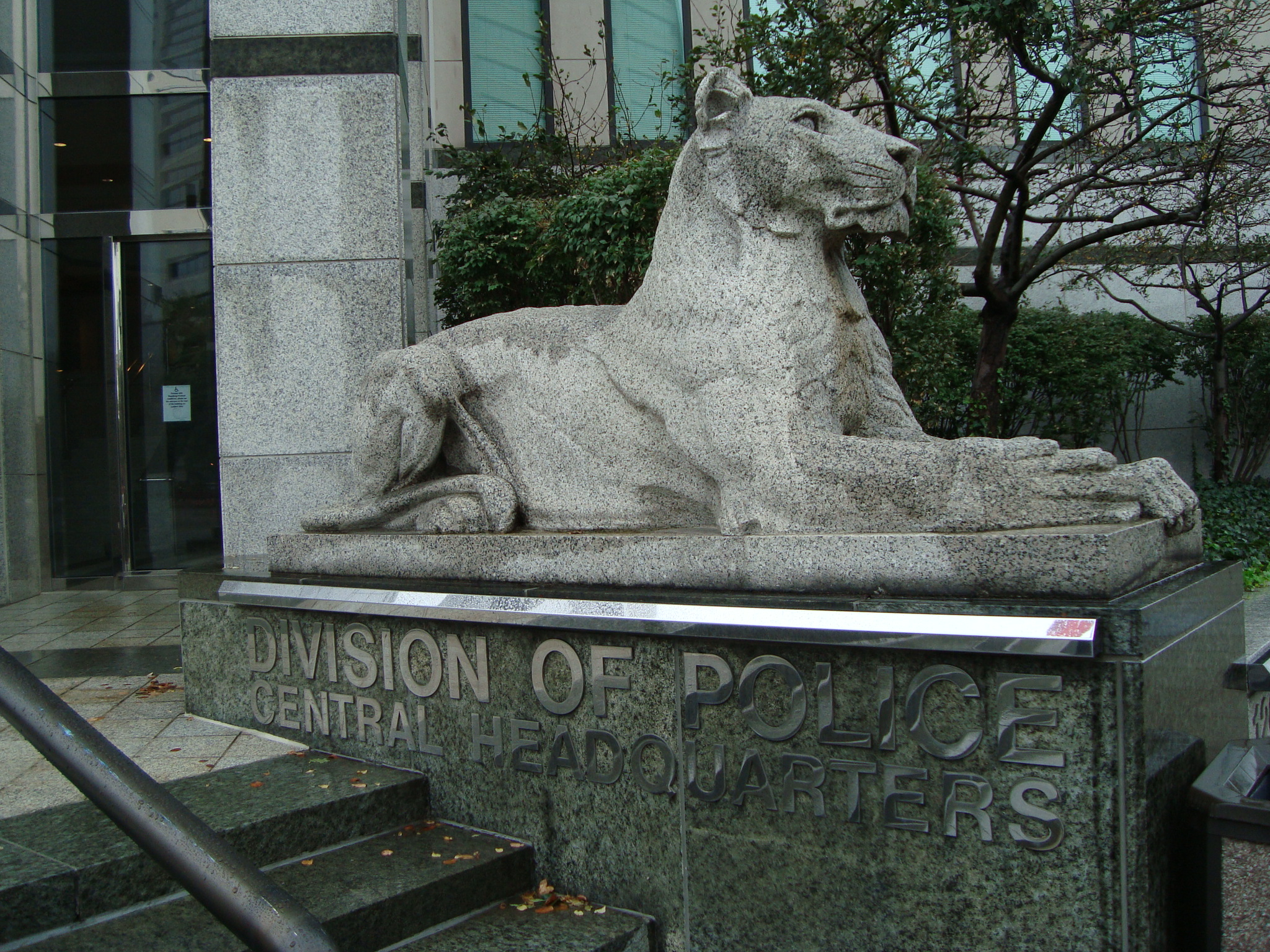
One of the two lion sculptures

The building was constructed with two stone lion sculptures, nicknamed Patience and Perseverance, first installed at the original front entrance. The 9,000 lb (4,100 kg) lions have been moved three times – in 1991 to the new police headquarters at 120 Marconi Boulevard, in 2012 back to the original building, and in 2017 back to the new headquarters. The first move was prompted by the police offices moving, while the second was part of improving 77 North Front Street during its restoration and expansion. Columbus police were upset with the move, even though the new building was supposed to gain new sculptures. The police union backed the officers, and secured a donation from contractors to move the lion sculptures back to the new headquarters in 2017, where they remain today.

== History ==
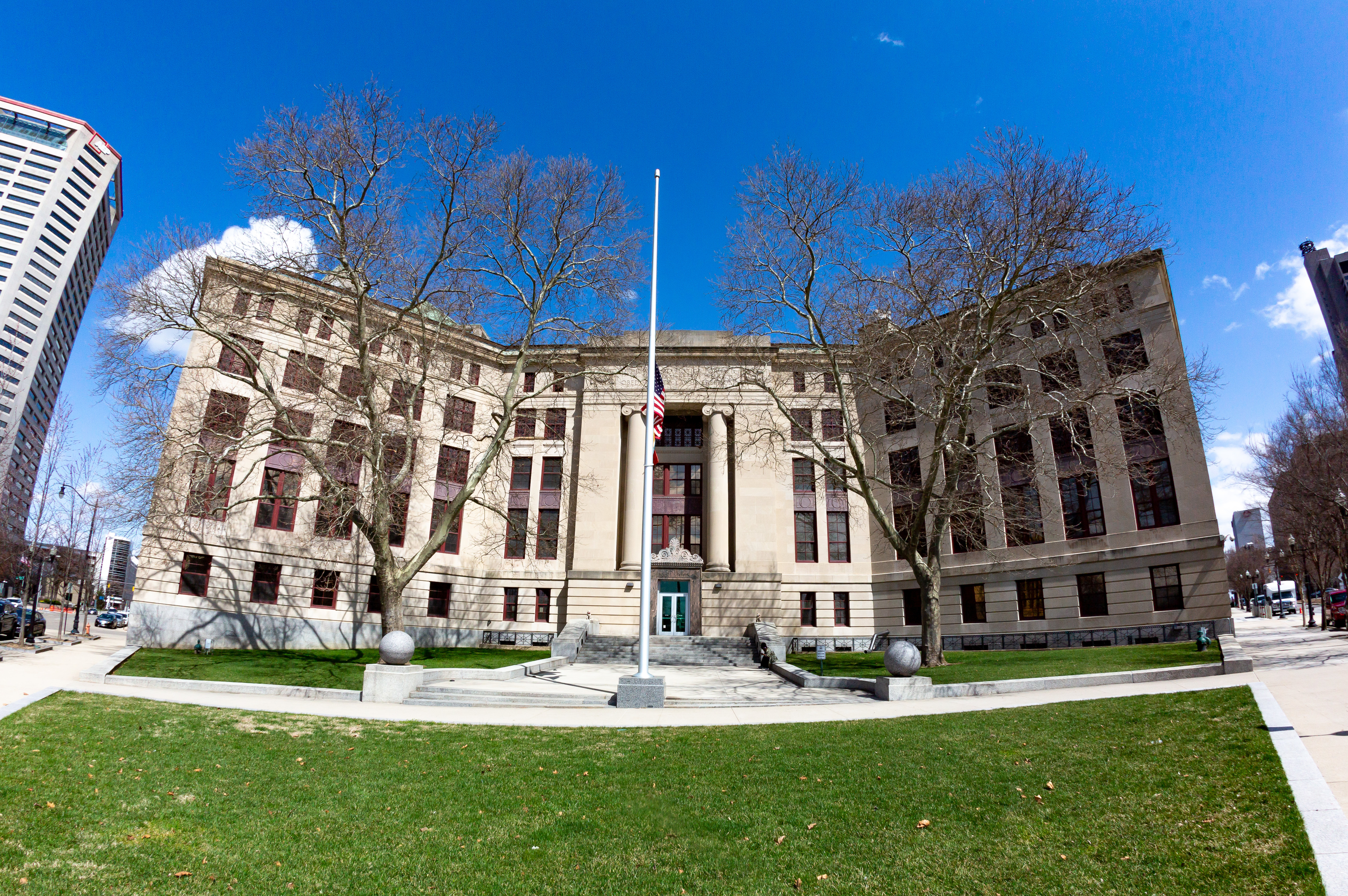
Former main entrance, looking northeast

The building was built to house the Columbus police headquarters and jail, as the fourth headquarters for the department. It was completed in 1930; with a planned opening in March 1930. Referred to in plans as the Safety Building, it was named the Central Police Station during construction in 1928, with an address of 120 West Gay Street.

In 1933, mayor Henry Worley announced a plan to consolidate city offices, all to be within either City Hall or the Central Police Station. The moves would cut expenses during the Great Depression, moving the municipal court into the police building. In the following year, the Columbus Fire Department also announced it was moving its headquarters into the police station building. The county relief commission was moving out of the first floor space, where fire department records and office space would replace them. Mechanical equipment, including fire engines, would remain at Engine House No. 1 at Front and Elm streets.

In 1988, the building was included as a contributing property to the Columbus Civic Center Historic District, nominated to the National Register of Historic Places. The nomination was prepared in the late 1980s by the City of Columbus's Economic Development Division. The district was determined to be eligible for the National Register on September 14, 1988, due to its association with community planning, engineering, government, and transportation in the city, and for its Art Deco, Neoclassical, and Renaissance Revival architecture. Even though its suitability was confirmed, the district was never listed.

By the late 1980s, the building was determined to be too small to serve as the police headquarters, and to have deteriorating plumbing. The department expanded from about 350 officers in 1930 to 1,376 in 1990. The Division of Police moved to a new headquarters building with over twice the space, located at 120 Marconi Boulevard just to the north, in 1991. Subsequently, the building remained vacant. Beginning in 2000, the building's windows and roof were replaced with modern, energy-efficient materials while preserving their original external appearances. Asbestos removal was one of the other projects at the time; the total repair cost was $4 million.

In July 2011, the building received a more extensive renovation, at a cost of $33.7 million. The most visible portion of the renovation included construction of a five-story curtain wall wrapping from its east to north sides, adding a new 30,000 sq ft (2,800 m^{2}) space. The building also gained air conditioning and communication systems, functions that were previously missing from the structure. An underground tunnel to the basement of Columbus City Hall, included in the original 1920s plan to facilitate the movement of prisoners to and from the municipal courtroom located there, was rebuilt for the use of city employees. Employees of the city attorney's office, the income-tax division, and the public safety, human resources, civil service, and purchasing departments relocated from the Beacon Building and the now-demolished 109 N. Front St. into the renovated building beginning in the spring of 2013.

== See also ==
- Government of Columbus, Ohio
