= Shannon Hardin =

American politician

President of the Columbus City Council
- Incumbent
- Assumed office January 2, 2018
- Preceded by: Zach Klein

Member of the Columbus City Council from the 9th district
- Incumbent
- Assumed office October 7, 2014
- Preceded by: Troy Miller

Personal details
- Born: April 7, 1987 (age 39) Columbus, Ohio, U.S.
- Party: Democratic
- Education: Morehouse College (BA)
- Website: Campaign website

Shannon G. Hardin (born April 7, 1987) is an American Democratic politician who has served as the President of the Columbus, Ohio City Council since January 2018.

Hardin is a Columbus native, and attended Columbus Africentric K-8 and Columbus Alternative High School before attending Morehouse College in Atlanta. After college, Hardin served as the External Affairs Manager, LGBTQ liaison, and was on the Religious Advisory Commission for the Office of then-Columbus Mayor Michael B. Coleman. Hardin was appointed to Columbus City Council on October 7, 2014 to fill the vacancy created by the resignation of Troy Miller. On November 3, 2015, he won election to fill the remainder of the unexpired term.

Since January 2018, Hardin has served as President of Columbus City Council. In that capacity, he serves as the head of the legislative branch of the City of Columbus. Additionally, Hardin serves as the Chair of Rules Committee and the Housing, Homelessness, and Building Committee.

Hardin championed the Columbus Promise program starting in 2011 which provides Columbus City School students tuition-free access to Columbus State Community College.

Hardin helped develop the LinkUS plan for bus rapid transit, which voters approved in November 2024 as a levy for the Central Ohio Transit Authority. For his work on LinkUS, Hardin was awarded the American Public Transportation Association's "Distinguished Service Award" in 2024 given to one elected official in the US each year.

Hardin is openly gay; a first for a Columbus City Council president. He lives on the far east side with his son Noah and two pets, Teddy and Bella.

== Electoral history ==
Election Results
Year	Office	Election	Votes for Hardin	%	Opponent	Party	Votes	%
2015	Columbus City Council	General	81,945	70.07%	Ashley Wnek	Republican	33,551	28.69
2017	Columbus City Council	General	60,165 (2nd)*	23.46%				
2021	Columbus City Council	General	65,230	29.00%				
2023	Columbus City Council	General	141,205	100.00%				
