= 2023 Columbus, Ohio City Council Election =

2023 Columbus City Council election
- November 7, 2023

9 seats on the Columbus City Council 5 seats needed for a majority
	Majority party
Party	Democratic
Last election	7
Seats won	9
Seat change	▲2 (Note: The total number of seats was increased from 7 to 9 for this election.)
President before election
Shannon Hardin
Democratic
Elected President
Shannon Hardin
Democratic

The 2023 Columbus City Council election was held on November 7, 2023, to elect the nine members of the Columbus City Council. Primary elections were scheduled for May 2, 2023, but were cancelled as no more than two candidates were placed on the ballot for any ward (the top two candidates in each ward would have advanced to the general election).

== Background ==
This was the first municipal election to held under the new hybrid at-large council structure approved by Columbus voters in a 2018 referendum. Following this election, the total number of councillors was increased from seven to nine, each representing a single ward (as opposed to the at-large representation of previous councils). However, voters are able to select their preferred candidate in all nine wards, rather than only the ward in which they are registered to vote.

2018 Columbus city charter amendment
Choice	Votes	%
For	64,285	75.06
Against	21,358	24.94
Total	85,643	100.00

To ensure that council terms remain staggered, councillors elected in 2023 will draw lots at the beginning of the 2024 council session, with five members serving a four-year term and four members serving a two-year term (increasing to four years after the 2025 municipal election).

Notably, with the addition of two new seats (and incumbent council member Mitchell Brown not running for re-election), this was the first time since 2015 that non-incumbent candidates were elected.

== Results ==
Note: Columbus City Council is officially non-partisan and all candidates appear on the ballot without a party affiliation. Affiliations listed here are according to the candidates themselves and party endorsement lists.

=== District 1 ===
Party	Candidate	Votes	%
Democratic	Chris Wyche	143,059	100.0
Total votes		143,059	100.0

=== District 2 ===
Party	Candidate	Votes	%
Democratic	Nancy Day-Achauer	122,930	71.6
Republican	Luis Gil	48,746	28.4
Total votes		171,676	100.0

=== District 3 ===
Party	Candidate	Votes	%
Democratic	Rob Dorans (incumbent)	142,045	100.0
Total votes		142,045	100.0

=== District 4 ===
Party	Candidate	Votes	%
Democratic	Emmanuel Remy (incumbent)	102,069	59.5
Democratic	Adrienne Hood	69,576	40.5
Total votes		171,645	100.0

=== District 5 ===
Party	Candidate	Votes	%
Democratic	Nick Bankston (incumbent)	120,634	69.8
Independent	Farxaan Jeyte	52,265	30.3
Total votes		172,899	100.0

=== District 6 ===
Party	Candidate	Votes	%
Democratic	Melissa Green	144,327	100.0
Total votes		144,327	100.0

=== District 7 ===
Party	Candidate	Votes	%
Democratic	Shayla Favor (incumbent)	145,504	100.0
Total votes		145,504	100.0

=== District 8 ===
Party	Candidate	Votes	%
Democratic	Lourdes Barroso De Padilla (incumbent)	141,637	100.0
Total votes		141,637	100.0

=== District 9 ===
Party	Candidate	Votes	%
Democratic	Shannon Hardin (incumbent)	141,205	100.0
Total votes		141,205	100.0
