= Beacon Building =

Office building in Columbus, Ohio

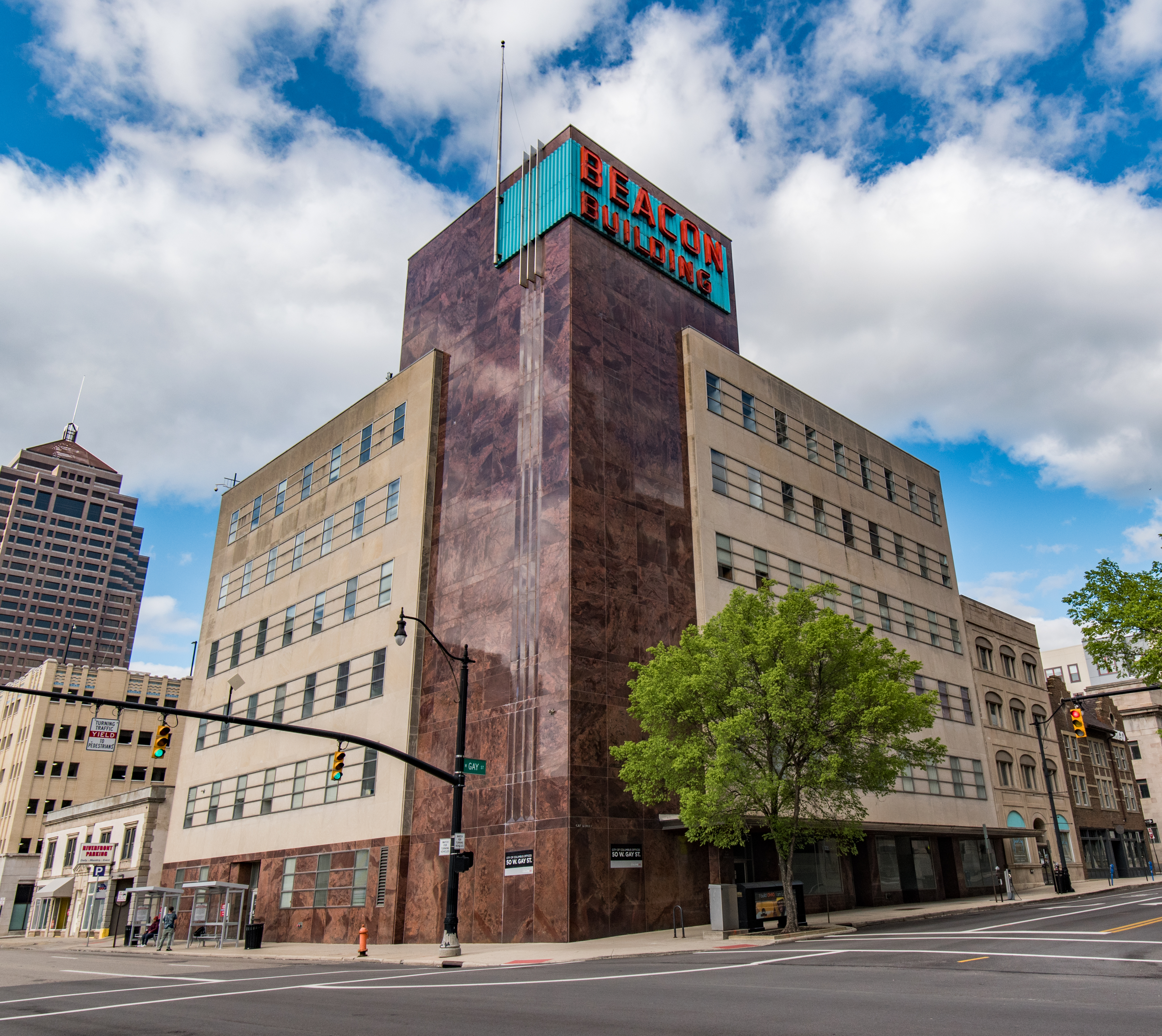
- Interactive map of the Beacon Building area
- Alternative names: Beacon Mutual Indemnity Co. building

General information
- Type: Office
- Architectural style: Mid-century modern
- Location: 50 W. Gay Street, Columbus, Ohio
- Coordinates: 39.96371°N 83.00242°W
- Year built: c. 1955–1957
- Owner: City of Columbus

Technical details
- Floor count: 6
- Floor area: 70,500 sq ft (6,550 m^{2})

Design and construction
- Architects: Benham, Richards and Armstrong

The Beacon Building is an office building in Downtown Columbus, Ohio. It is located in the Columbus Civic Center area, diagonal to Columbus City Hall. The mid-century modern building was designed by Benham, Richards and Armstrong and completed in 1957. It was first owned by the Beacon Mutual Indemnity Co., and was sold in 1978 to the City of Columbus, which used it for government offices until 2018.

== History ==
Construction began around 1955, with an expected opening on May 1, 1957. The building was completed in 1957. It was purchased by the city in 1978 for just over $2 million. At this time, the city extensively renovated it, and it became home to five city agencies: the Departments of Community Services and Public Utilities, the Divisions of Electricity and Traffic Engineering, and the Civil Service Commission. The city tried selling it five years later for $2 million, though there were no buyers. It later became home to only the city's public service department. By mid-2018, the department moved to the new Michael B. Coleman Government Center, and the city was looking to sell the Beacon Building to a developer.

In 2014, most of the building's three decorative fins were removed. The aluminum fins were removed following a faulty bolt breaking in the wind. The removal work included a full exterior inspection, which found other deteriorated bolts, though no other damage.

== Design ==
The Beacon Building was designed by Benham, Richards and Armstrong, a Columbus architecture firm. It has six stories and 70,500 sq ft (6,550 m^{2}). The building was a notable entry in a Columbus Landmarks-hosted mid-century modern architecture survey in 2011–12.

The building features numerous midcentury modern materials: a red granite tower and storefront base, Indiana limestone curtain walls, and three decorative aluminum fins. The fins originally stretched parallel to each other from the first story to the sixth, in 5-foot sections, though most of the sections were removed in 2014. The building's exterior features a large red neon sign on a corrugated teal backdrop, reading "BEACON BUILDING". All six floors have punched windows, connected by aluminum in a grid-like fashion. The building has narrow hallways and ramps with unusual turns and corners, leading some offices to be large and others remarkably small.
