= Columbus City Council =

City council; lawmaking body of the City of Columbus, Ohio

Coordinates: 39°57′45″N 83°00′12″W

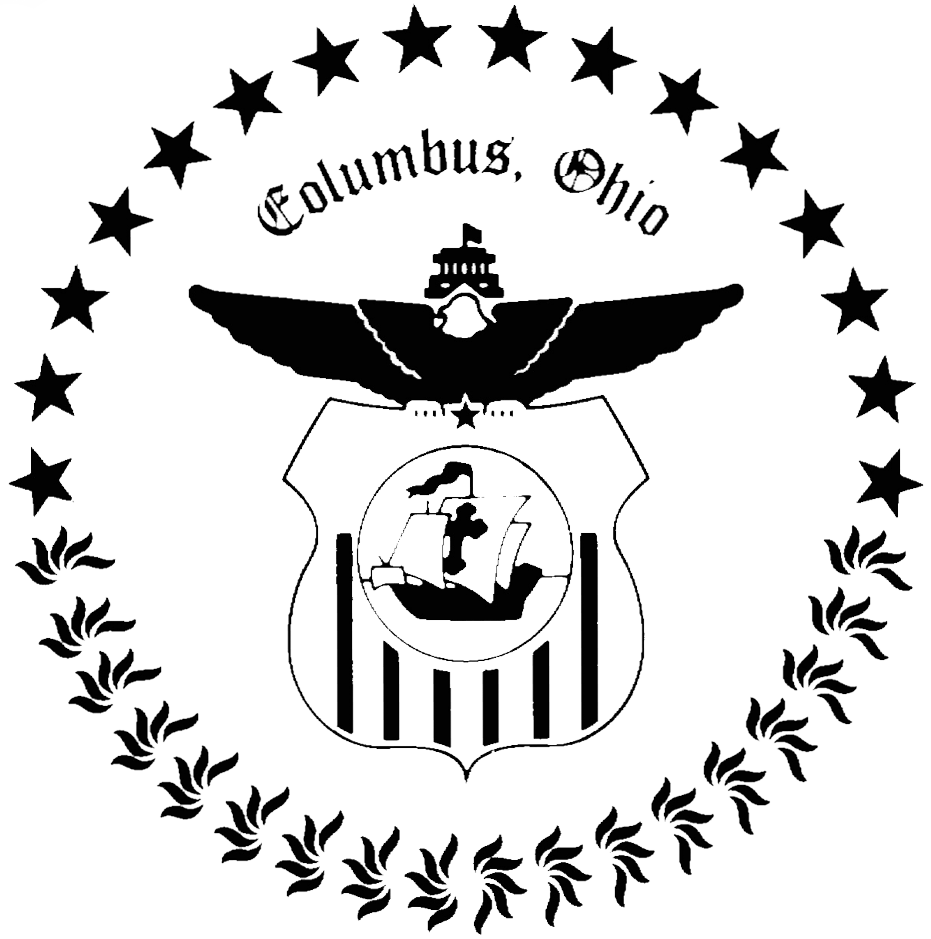

Type
- Type: Unicameral

Leadership
- President: Shannon Hardin, Democratic since January 2018
- President pro tem: Rob Dorans, Democratic since January 2023

Structure
- Seats: 9
- Political groups: Democratic (9)

Elections
- Voting system: At-large
- Last election: November 7, 2023
- Next election: November 11, 2025

Meeting place
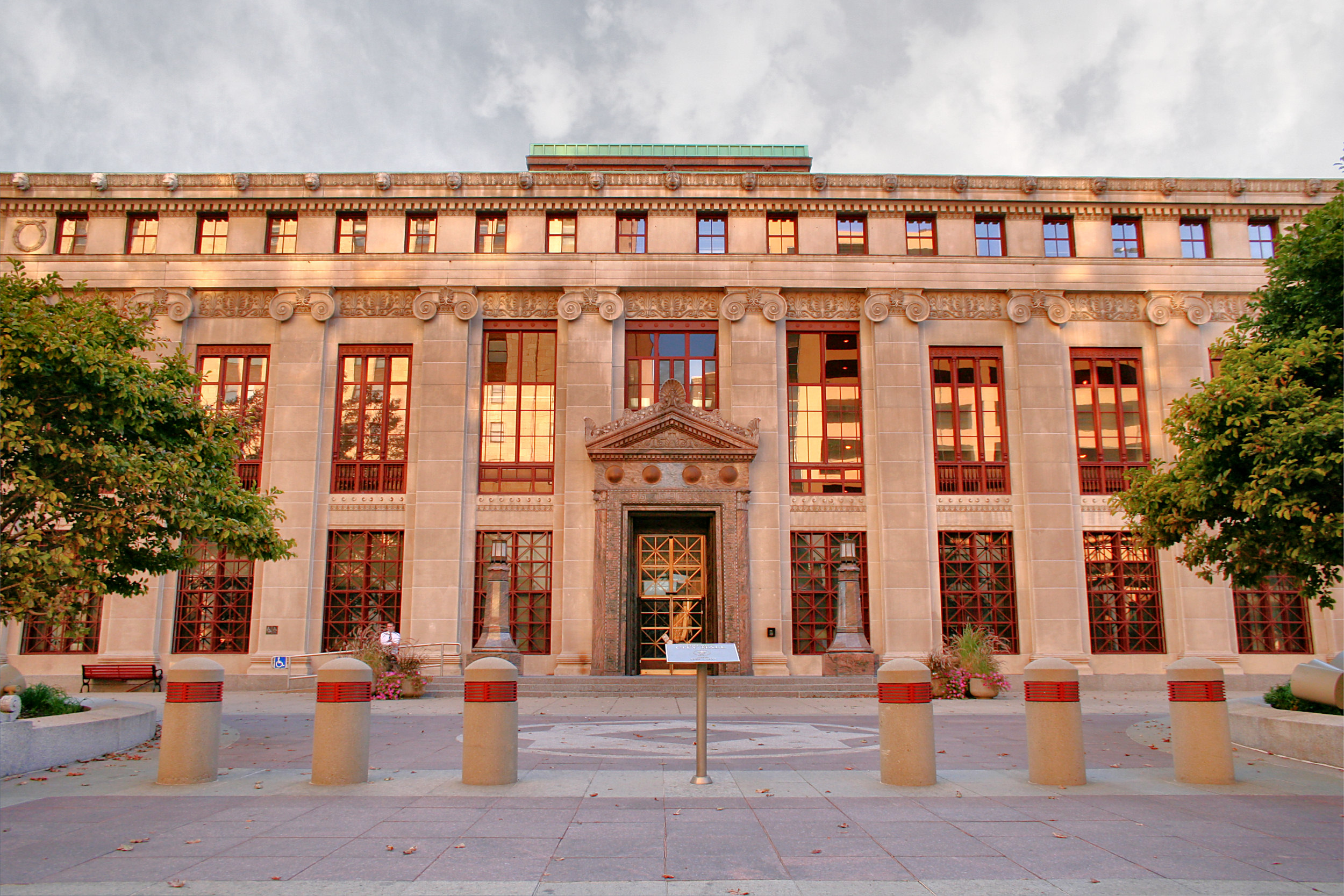
- City Hall, Columbus, Ohio

Website
- columbus.gov/council

The Columbus City Council is the lawmaking body of Columbus, Ohio. It meets in the City Council Chambers located on the second floor of Columbus City Hall. Following the 2023 election, the City Council expanded from seven to nine members. Council members are elected at-large in a single election but are separated into nine districts.

Members of council are elected to four year terms. Prior to the 2025 election, all members were elected simultaneously. Following the 2023 election, which saw the size of council grow from seven to nine members, council was divided into two groups that would serve staggered terms through a drawing of lots. One group of four members (Lot B) was to serve a two year term, while the other group of five members (Lot A) was to serve a four year term. Following the 2025 election, all councillors going forward would be elected to four year terms.

== Columbus City Council members ==
The members of Columbus City Council are:

- District 1: Chris Wyche
- District 2: Nancy Day-Achauer
- District 3: Rob Dorans
- District 4: Emmanuel Remy
- District 5: Nick Bankston
- District 6: Melissa Green
- District 7: Tiara Ross
- District 8: Lourdes Barroso de Padilla
- District 9: Shannon Hardin (Council President)

== See also ==
- Government of Columbus, Ohio
