= Michael B. Coleman Government Center =

City office building in Columbus, Ohio

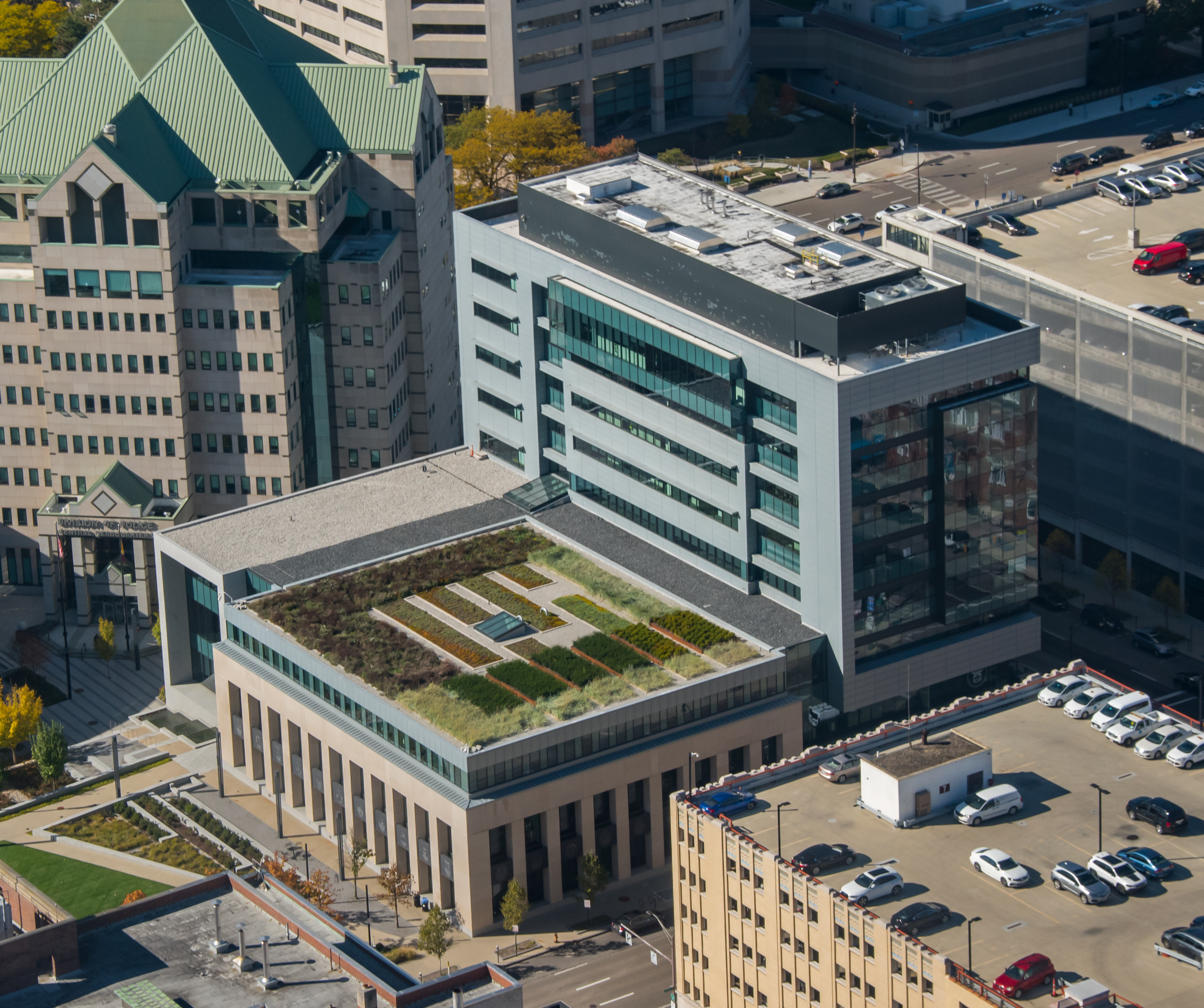
- Interactive map of the Michael B. Coleman Government Center area

General information
- Location: 111 N. Front Street, Columbus, Ohio, United States
- Coordinates: 39°57′51″N 83°00′12″W
- Completed: February 12, 2018
- Owner: City of Columbus

Technical details
- Floor count: 8
- Floor area: 196,000 square feet (18,200 m^{2})

Design and construction
- Architecture firm: Schooley Caldwell, DesignGroup

Other information
- Parking: Municipal garage

The Michael B. Coleman Government Center is a municipal office building of Columbus, Ohio, in the city's downtown Civic Center. The building, completed in 2018, is named for former mayor Michael Coleman.

== Attributes ==
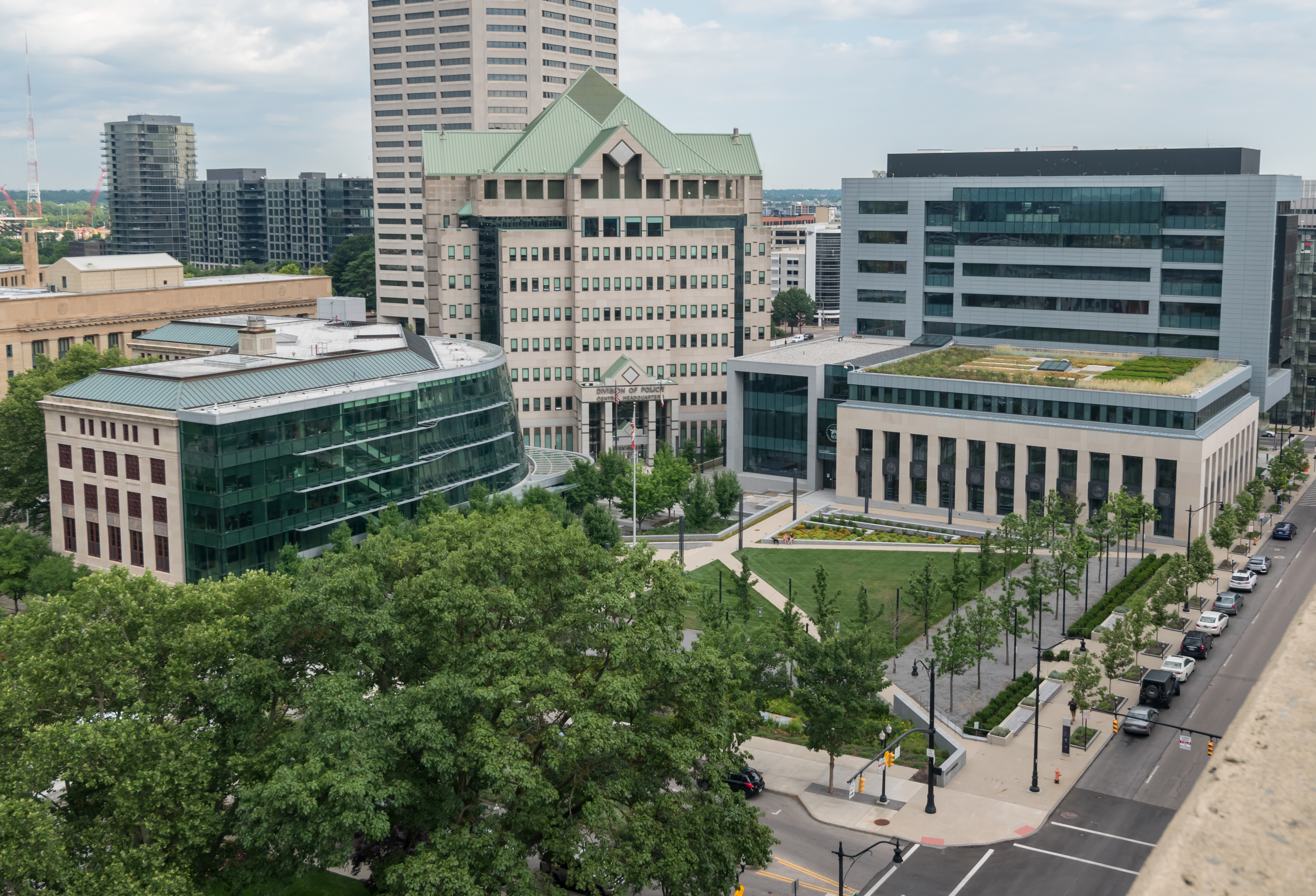
The Coleman Center (right), among other municipal offices and the City Commons park

The Michael B. Coleman Government Center is an eight-story, 196,000-square-foot (18,200 m^{2}) municipal office building. The building is named for former mayor Michael B. Coleman in recognition of his 16 years as mayor and numerous accomplishments. The Government Center houses the departments of Building & Zoning Services, Public Service, Development, and Public Utilities. Its first floor is for public access to obtain building permits, ask zoning questions, and have access to other municipal services. The second floor has a public hearing room. It was built to house 538 city employees, most of whom were previously working in the nearby Beacon Building.

The building was designed by local architects Schooley Caldwell and DesignGroup, with MKSK designing its landscape architecture. It was built with two distinct sections: its three-story portion is designed with tall windows surrounded by limestone pilasters, resembling the nearby Columbus City Hall, and including a green roof. The other portion of the building is eight stories, with facades of glass and zinc panels. The building is LEED Silver certified. Local artists worked to integrate art into the building and site.

The building lies adjacent to City Commons, a park constructed at the same time as the building, replacing a surface parking lot. The park connects the Coleman Government Center with City Hall, the Police Headquarters, and 77 N. Front St. The building is also adjacent to a seven-story municipal parking garage, completed in early 2018, with 707 spaces.

== History ==
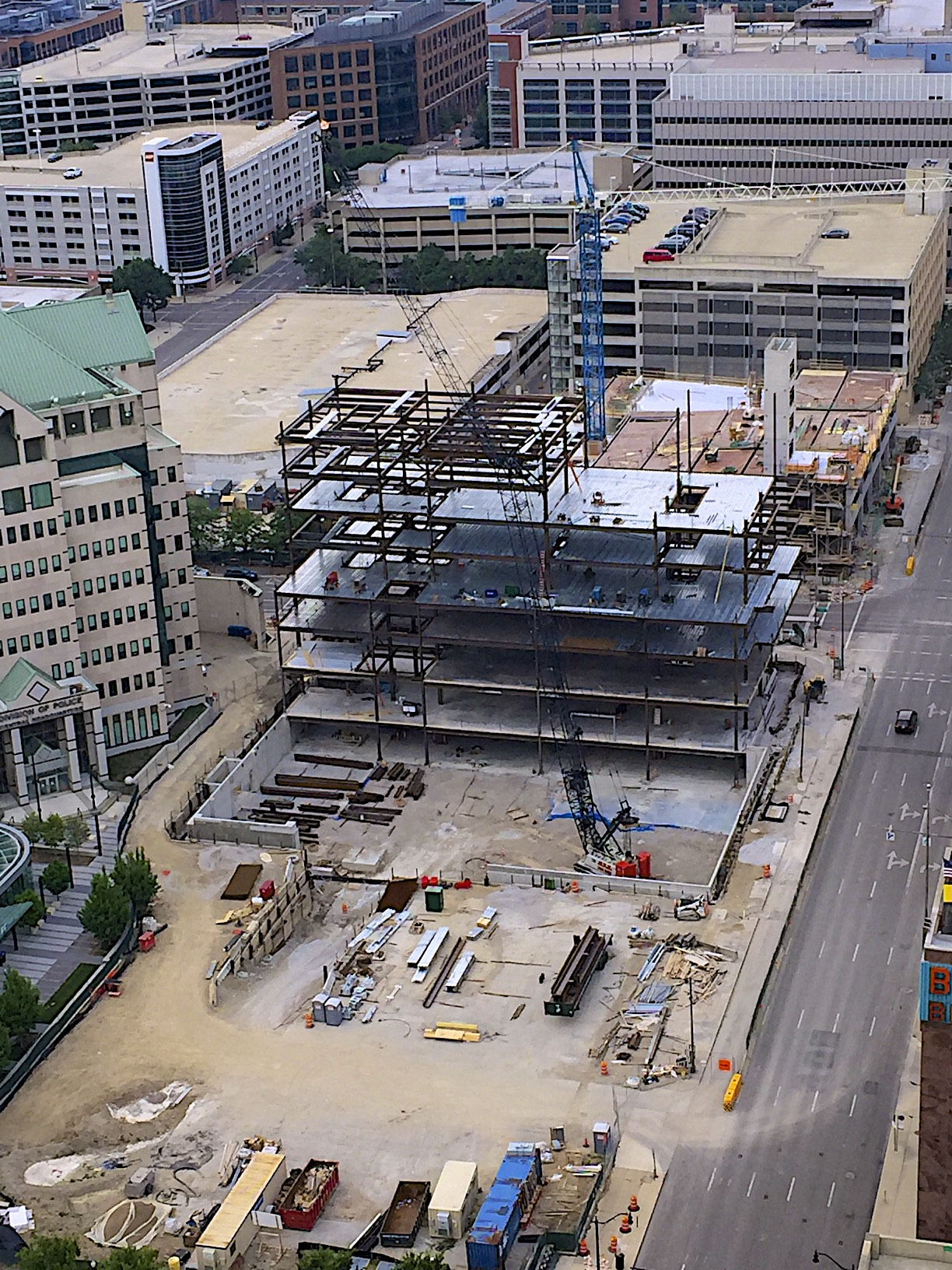
The building under construction, 2016

The Government Center was planned in 2013, replacing an old government building, 109 N. Front St. The old building was originally two separate buildings, combined with half stories and redundant stairwells. The new building would upgrade the city's offices, increase its square footage, and consolidate city functions. The Government Center also replaced the Harry E. Richter Workers Memorial Park, built in 2000, and its memorials moved to Battelle Riverfront Park in 2016. The Government Center building was estimated to cost $73 million, with its adjoining garage costing an additional $17 million. It was originally scheduled to be completed December 2017, and was christened on February 12, 2018. The first city employees moved into the building in March 2018. By July of that year, the building became completely inhabited.

== See also ==
- Government of Columbus, Ohio
