= Solid Waste Authority of Central Ohio =

Agency overview
- Formed: June 6, 1989
- Jurisdiction: Central Ohio
- Headquarters: Grove City, Ohio
- Agency executive: Joseph A. Lombardi, Executive Director
- Website: www.swaco.org

The Solid Waste Authority of Central Ohio (SWACO) was established by the Ohio General Assembly in 1989 as part of Ohio House Bill 592, which created Ohio's current solid waste management planning and regulatory programs. SWACO is a government-run entity responsible for the safe and sanitary management of all solid waste within its district. In this role, it operates the Franklin County Sanitary Landfill, as well as two transfer facilities, all for the benefit of Franklin County, Ohio, and parts of surrounding counties in central Ohio.

== Purpose ==
As one of Ohio's 52 solid waste districts, SWACO's primary goals established in Ohio House Bill 592 are to manage the municipal solid waste generated in central Ohio and to reduce central Ohio's reliance on the landfill by increasing efforts to reduce, reuse and recycle. The central Ohio region's diversion rate reached 50% in November 2019.

== Organization structure ==
SWACO is governed by a nine-member board. It derives its revenue primarily through fees levied on the disposal of solid waste at SWACO facilities and from the collection and sale of landfill gas to Aria Energy, which refines the gas, pumps it into the gas pipeline and sells it.

== Programs and services ==
In support of its goal to reduce Franklin County's reliance on the landfill through reuse, reduction and recycling, SWACO offers programs and services for residents, businesses, schools, events and communities.

Community services

- Negotiated rates for recycling and trash hauling services
- Grants for schools, nonprofits, government entities and events to offset the cost of recycling efforts
- Public education to educate consumers about the right ways to recycle
- Drop-off centers for recycling, household hazardous waste, electronic waste, pharmaceutical waste and other items that should be diverted from the landfill
- Yard waste compost services

Community outreach

- Tours of the landfill
- A recycling exhibit at the Columbus Zoo and Aquarium
- A “Recycle Right” exhibit at Center for Science and Industry (COSI) museum
- Participation in Junior Achievement's Biztown
- Recycling resources and programs for schools

In 2018, SWACO created the Central Ohio Food Waste Initiative, a group of more than 60 public and private organizations developing an action plan to cut Central Ohio's food waste in half by 2030. The action plan was released in the spring of 2019.

== Waste management ==
In 2016, SWACO began using auto shredder residue to cover the landfill each day. This is a more cost-effective and environmentally friendly approach than using dirt or soil.

SWACO transforms landfill gasses into usable energy through its landfill gas collection system, which harnesses the landfill gas and transforms it into compressed natural gas for vehicle fuel and into pipeline-quality gas.

SWACO has lessened the environmental impact of its vehicle fleet by using passenger vehicles, front load trucks and transfer trucks that run on compressed natural gas instead of petroleum-based fuels. In 2015 SWACO was designated as an Ohio Green Fleet through the Clean Fuel Ohio's statewide Green Fleet program for its efforts.

== Research ==
SWACO conducts and supports research to learn more about central Ohio's waste stream and what can be done to recycle more and landfill less. A 2019 audit of 20,000 Columbus households found that about 75% of residents participate in recycling, but one in four put items in their recycling containers that are not accepted in Franklin County's curbside recycling program. Another study done regularly, the Waste Characterization Study, examines the garbage at the landfill to find out what people are throwing away and what could have been recycled.
