= Columbus City Hall (Ohio) =

City hall in Columbus, Ohio

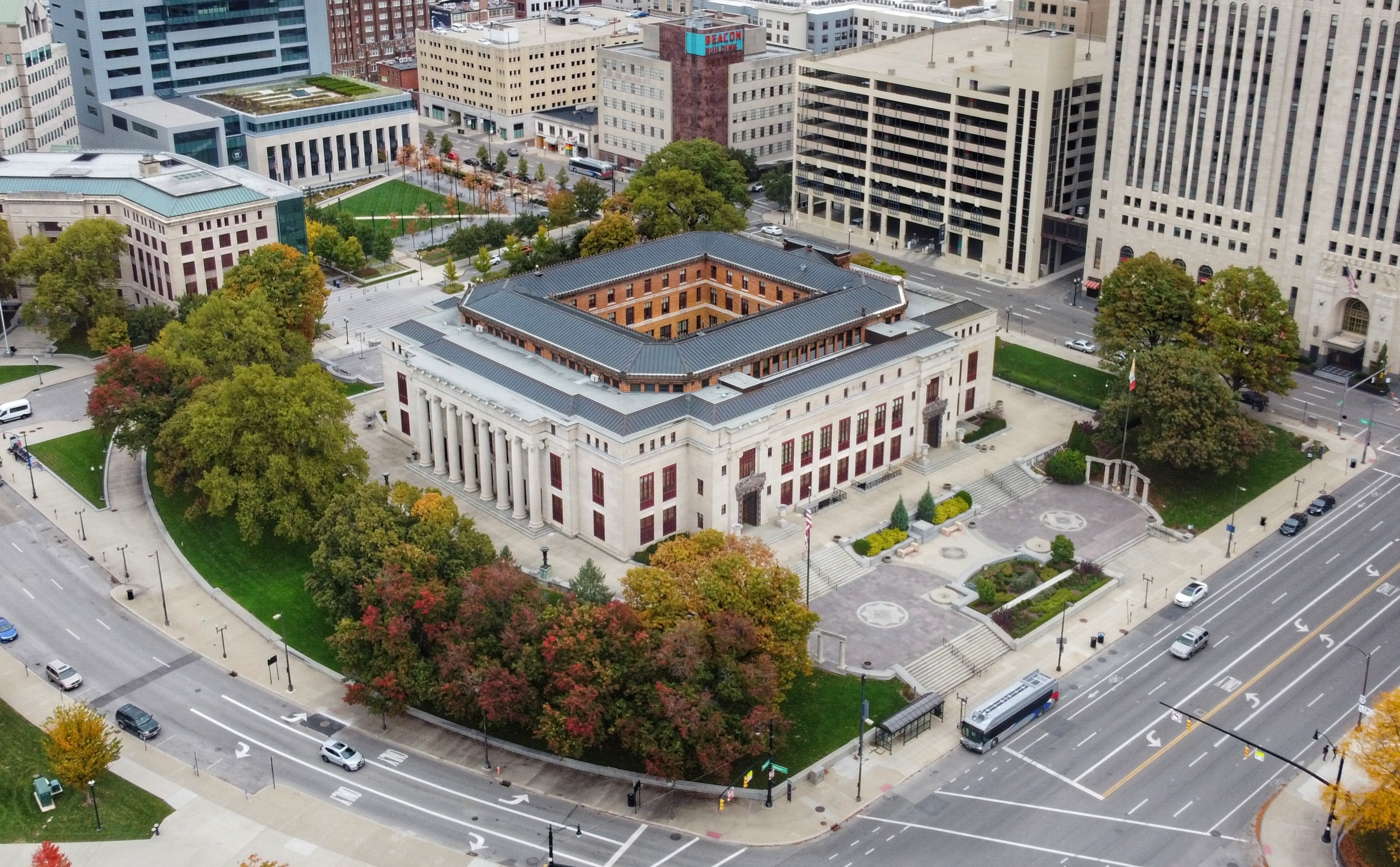
- City Hall from the southwest
- Interactive map of the Columbus City Hall area

General information
- Architectural style: Neoclassical
- Location: 90 West Broad Street; Columbus, Ohio
- Coordinates: 39.962783°N 83.003328°W
- Groundbreaking: October 29, 1926; 99 years ago
- Inaugurated: April 18, 1928; 98 years ago
- Renovated: 1936, 1949

Technical details
- Floor count: 5

Design and construction
- Architecture firm: Allied Architects Association of Columbus

Other information
- Public transit: 4, 7, 9, 10, 11, 12; CoGo

Columbus City Hall is the city hall of Columbus, Ohio, in the city's downtown Civic Center. It contains the offices of the city's mayor, auditor, and treasurer, and the offices and chambers of Columbus City Council.

City Hall was designed in a Neoclassical style by the Allied Architects Association of Columbus. It replaced offices in the Central Market building as well as a former permanent city hall. The new city hall was built from 1926 to 1928, during a period of extensive construction building the city's riverfront civic center. An additional wing was added to City Hall in 1936. Renovations took place in 1949 and 1986, and the building was determined to be eligible for the National Register of Historic Places as part of a historic district in 1988.

== History ==
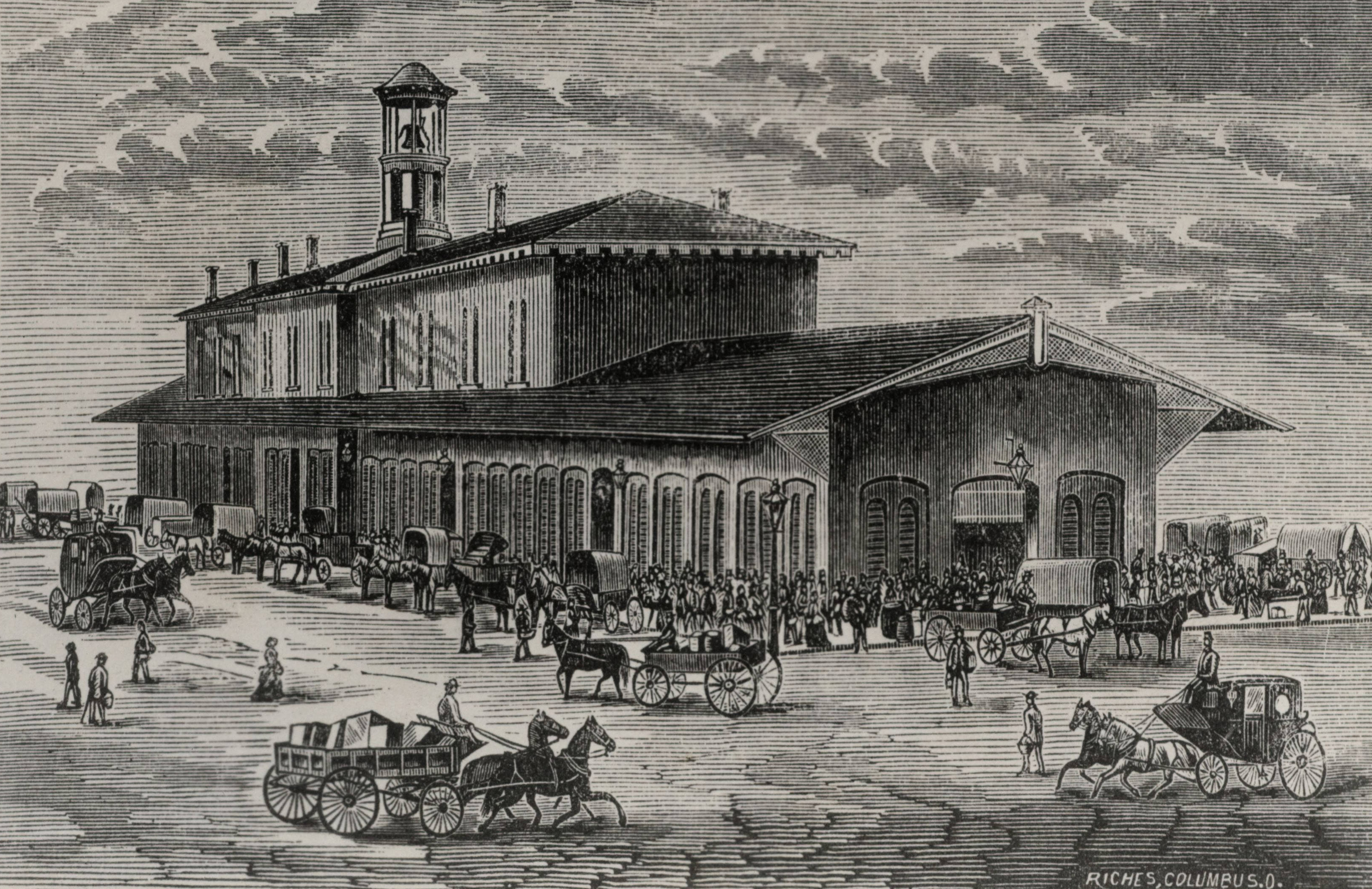
Central Market, home to the first city hall

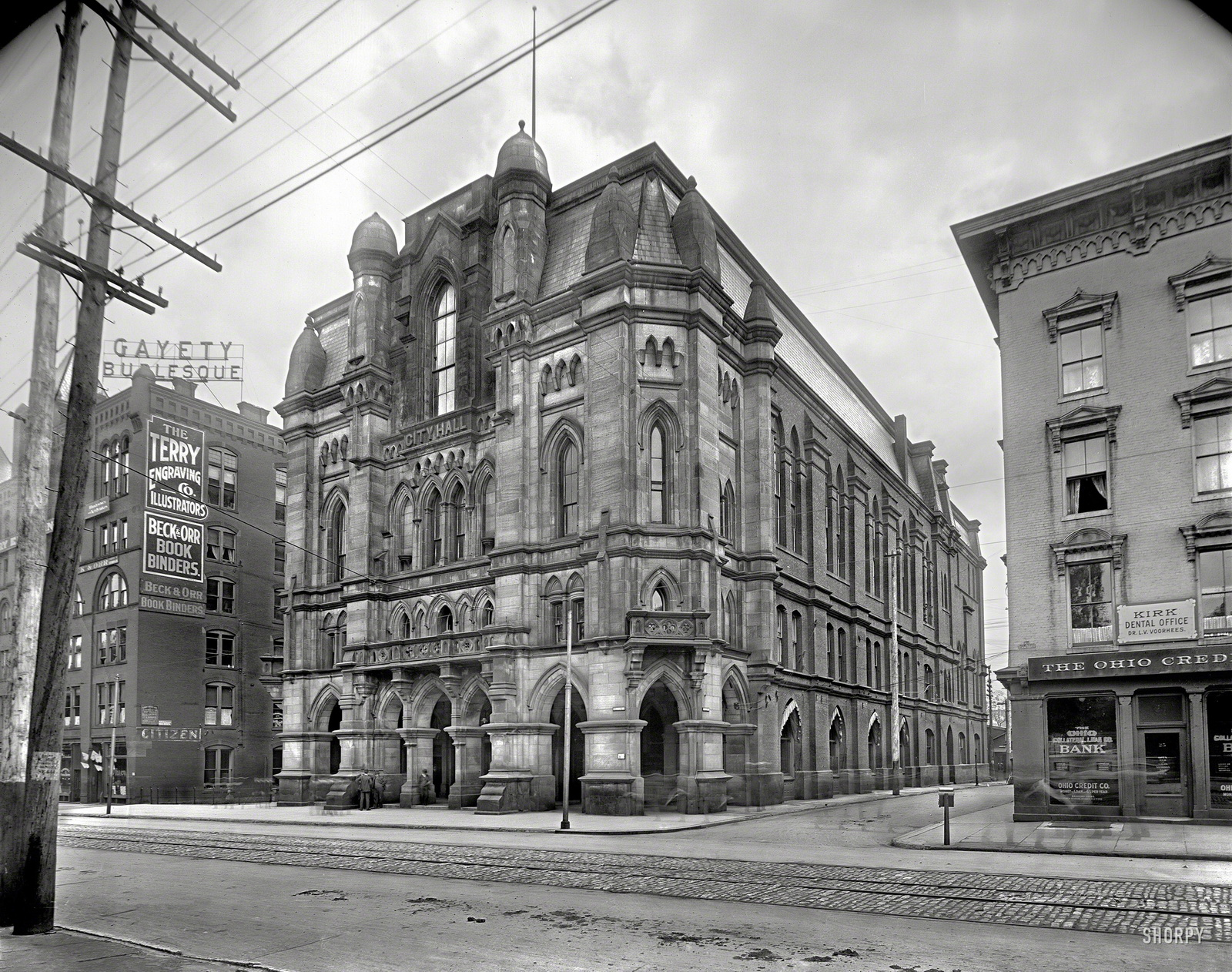
Columbus City Hall (1872–1921)

Columbus's first city hall was at the Central Market building, but it moved to a new building on Capitol Square in 1872. In 1921, a fire destroyed that building, now the site of the Ohio Theatre. James John Thomas, mayor of Columbus from 1920 to 1931, laid the cornerstone for a new City Hall on October 29, 1926. The building was dedicated on April 18, 1928.

Initially built in three sections surrounding a central courtyard at a cost of US$1.7 million (equivalent to $19,930,000 in 2019), a fourth section was added on the east side of City Hall in 1936 to enclose the courtyard and provide additional office space. The structure was further renovated in 1949.

City Council chambers, located on the second floor, were fully restored in 1986, and feature Art Deco elements echoing those found throughout the building.

In 1988, the building was included as a contributing property to the Columbus Civic Center Historic District, nominated to the National Register of Historic Places. The nomination was prepared in the late 1980s by the City of Columbus's Economic Development Division. The district was determined to be eligible for the National Register on September 14, 1988, due to its association with community planning, engineering, government, and transportation in the city, and for its Art Deco, Neoclassical, and Renaissance Revival architecture. Even though its suitability was confirmed, the district was never listed.

The south patio of City Hall facing Broad Street was named the M. D. Portman Plaza in 1996 after a long-serving City Council member. From 1955 to 2020, the plaza was home to a 20 foot (6.1 m) tall bronze statue of Christopher Columbus by Italian sculptor Edoardo Alfieri. The statue was a gift to the city of Columbus from the citizens of Genoa, Italy. It was removed during the George Floyd protests in the city and will be placed in a less controversial location.

== Attributes ==
The five-story building, constructed of Indiana limestone, was designed by the Allied Architects Association of Columbus in the Neoclassical style. Allied Architects also designed the adjacent Central Police Station building at West Gay Street and Marconi Boulevard, which opened on March 26, 1930, was vacated in 1991 with the opening of a new police headquarters building, and was renovated in 2012 as 77 North Front Street to allow the consolidation of various city government offices. City Hall was originally also the venue for the city's Municipal Court, and its proximity to the Police Station building provided for efficient movement of prisoners between the two buildings. The former third-floor municipal courtroom in City Hall now serves as a studio for the city's cable-carried government information TV channel.

Columbus City Hall is one of the buildings contained within the Columbus Civic Center Historic District, nominated to the National Register of Historic Places in 1988.

== Gallery ==
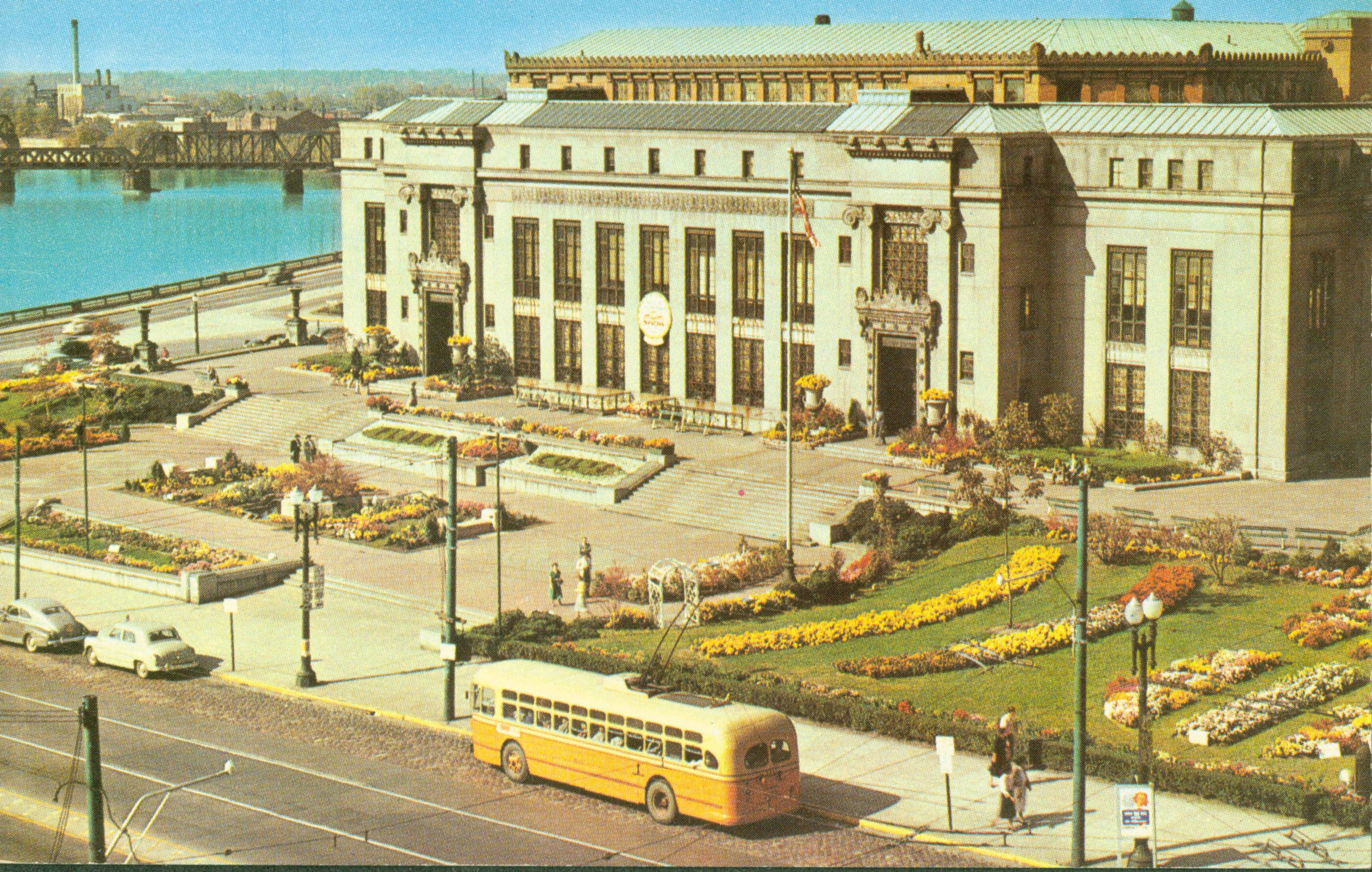
City Hall's plaza c. 1940s

The Portman Plaza in 2016, including the Statue of Christopher Columbus

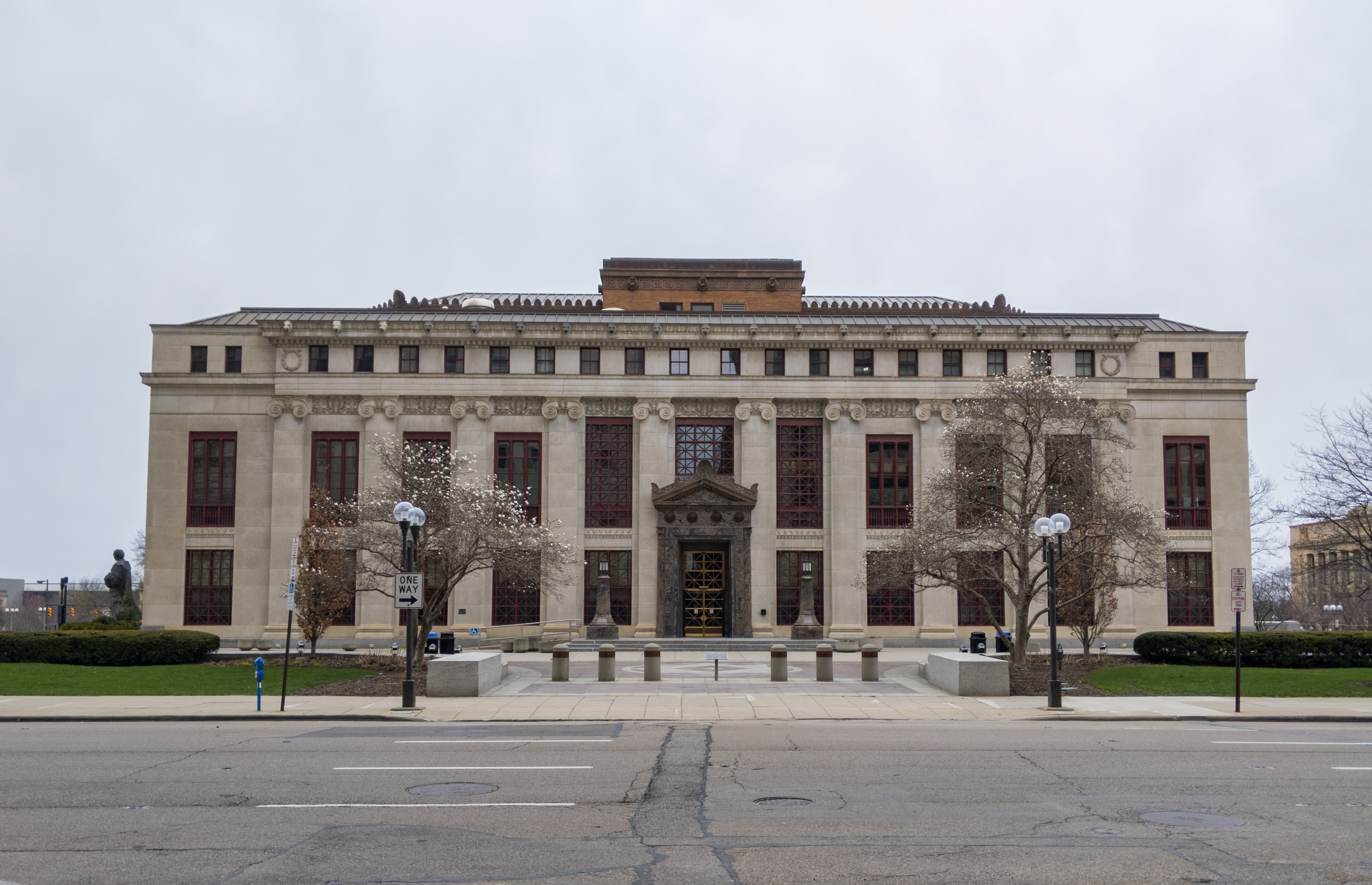
Main entrance and east plaza of Columbus City Hall on Front Street

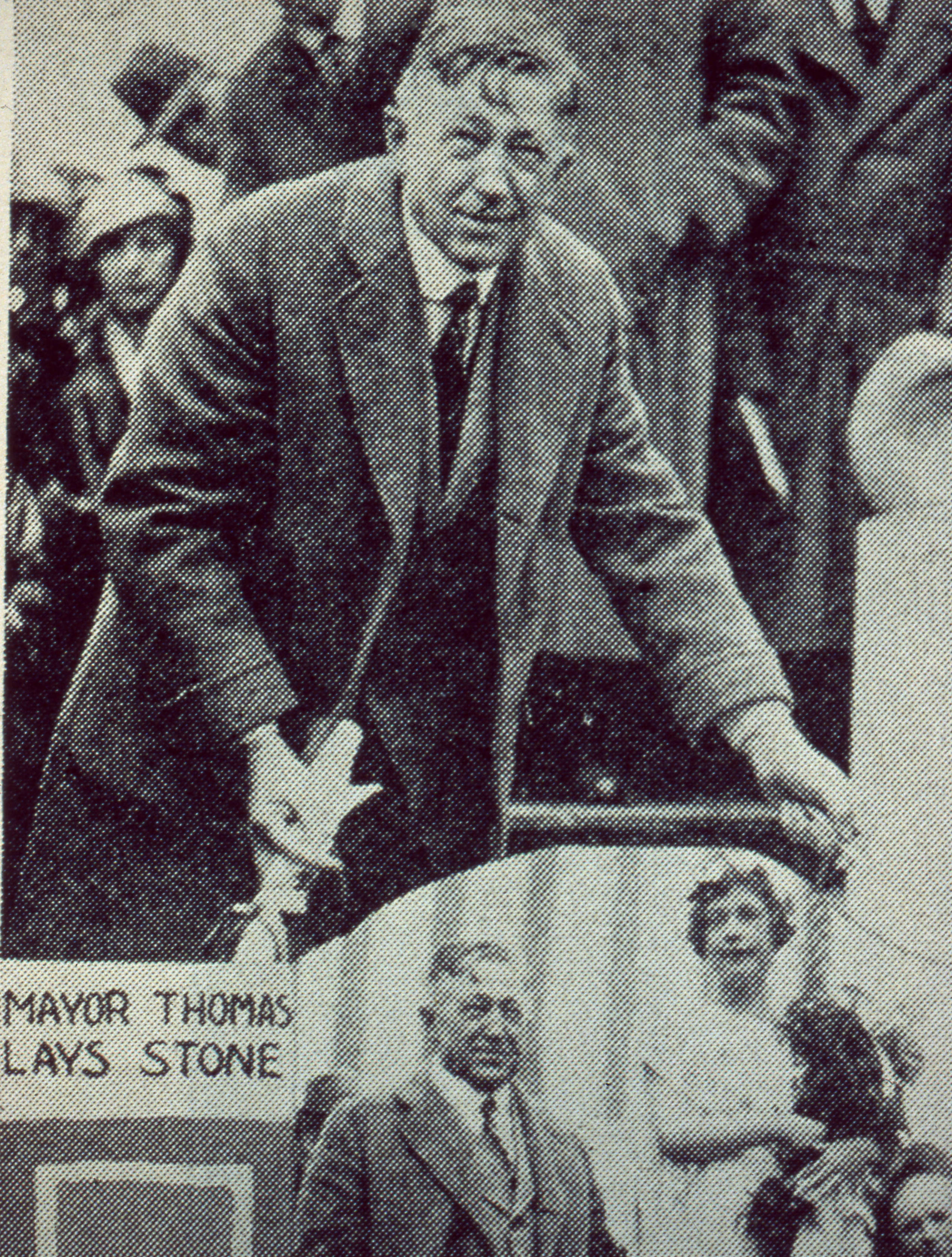
Mayor James John Thomas laying the cornerstone, 1926

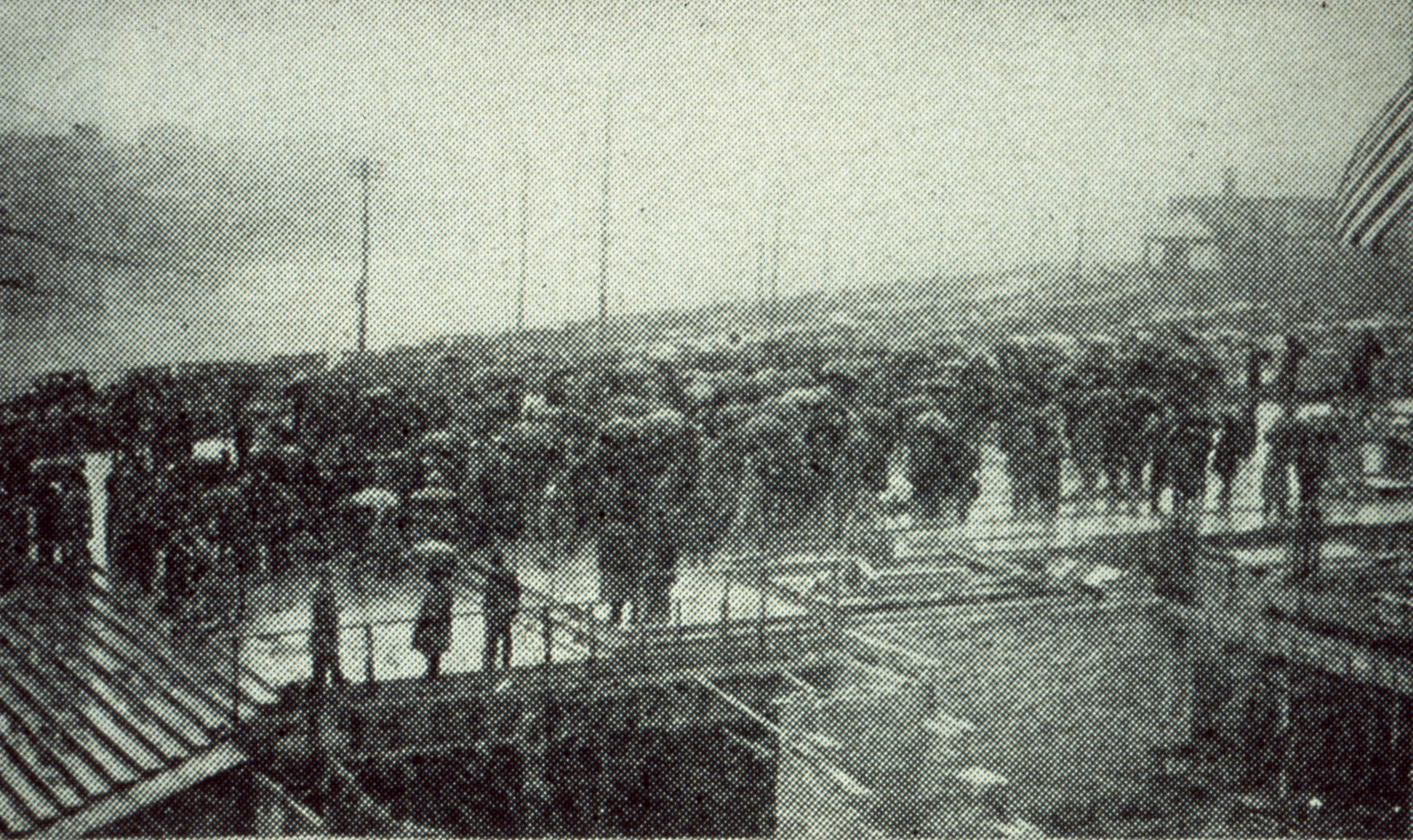
Crowds at the cornerstone-laying ceremony, 1926

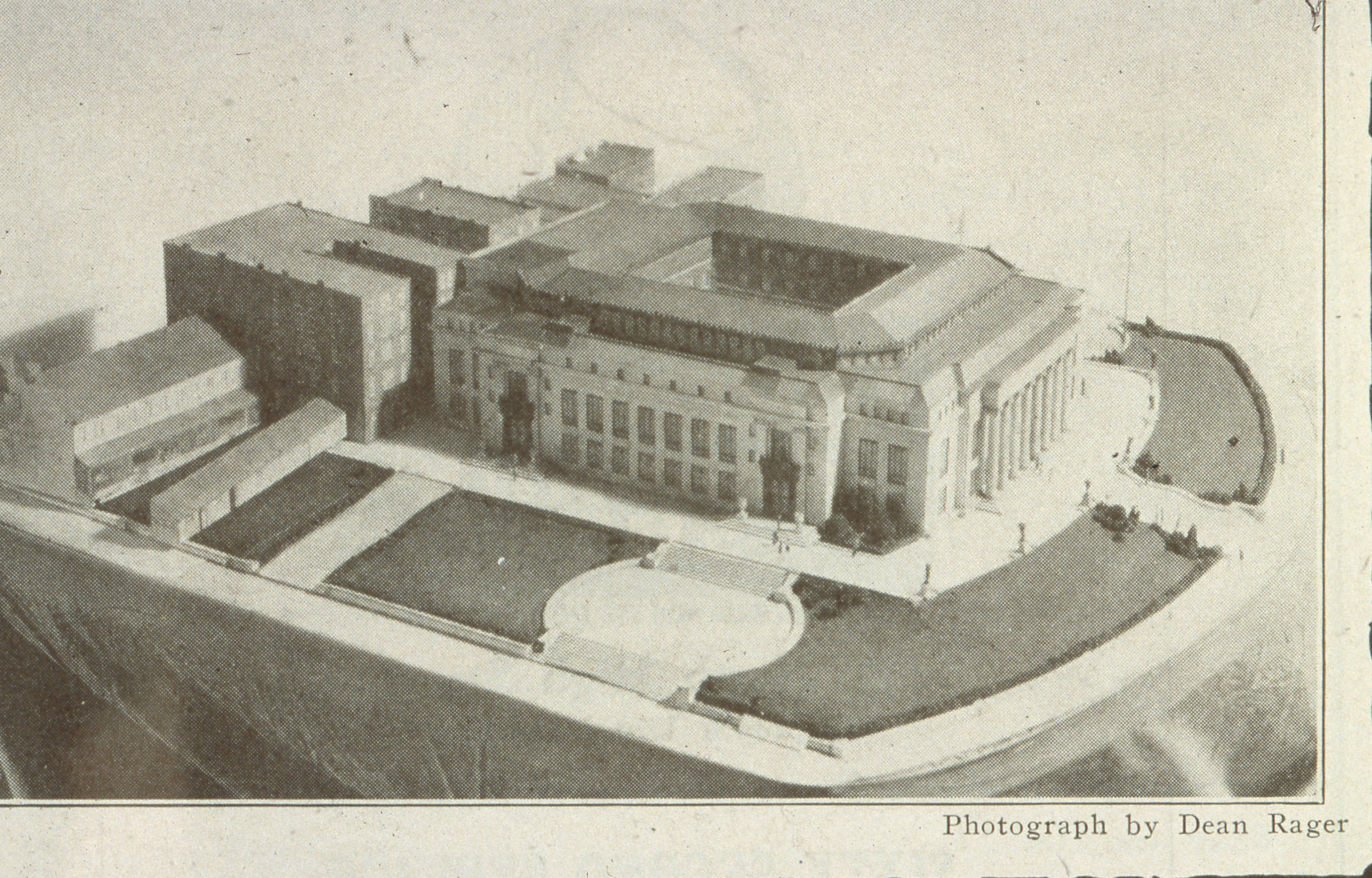
City Hall model, 1926

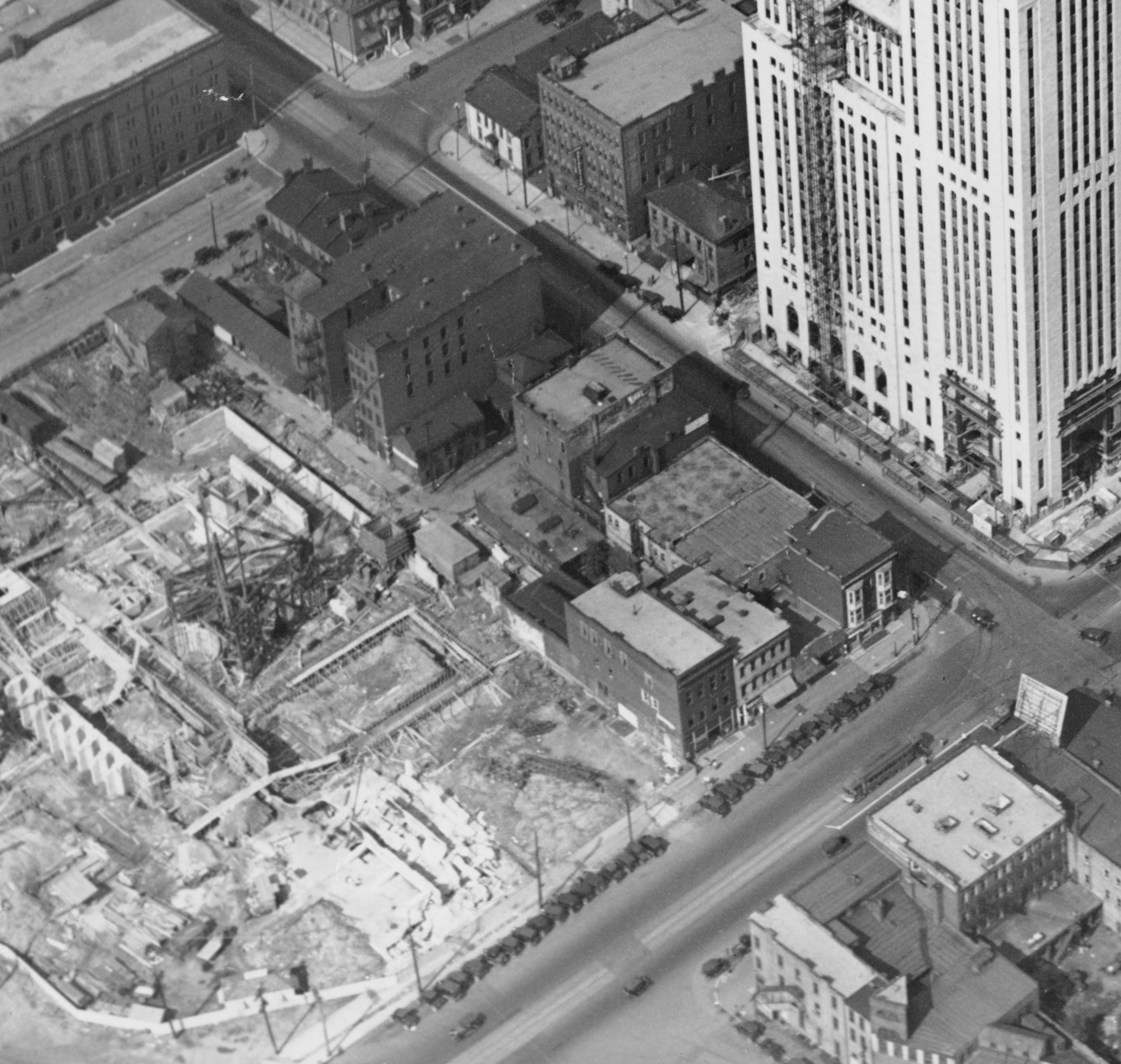
Construction in 1926

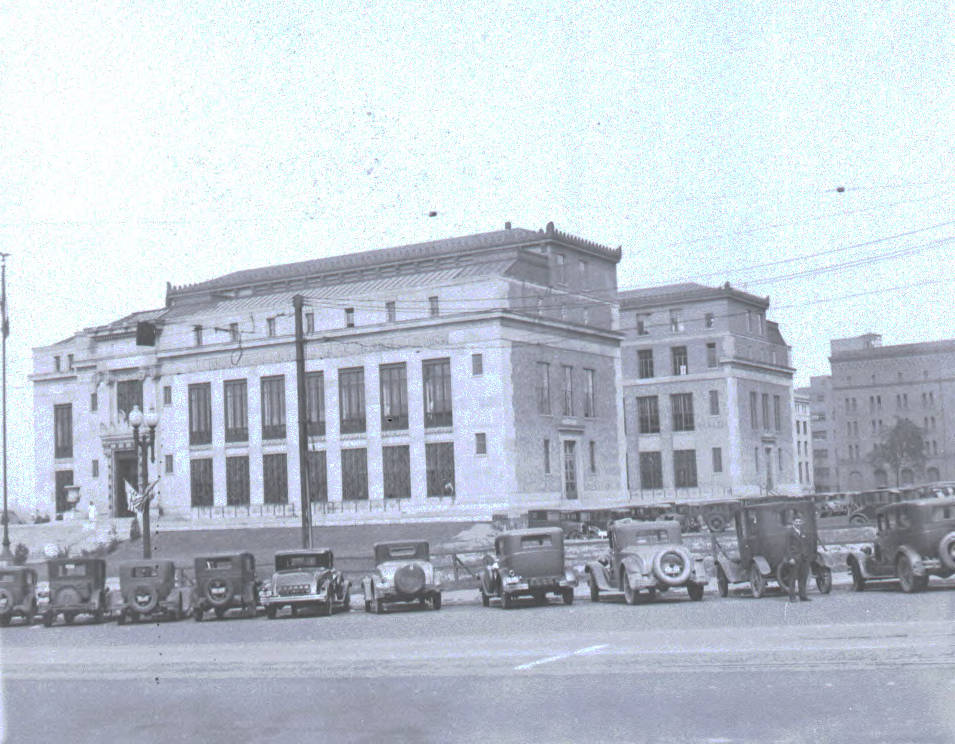
The building before its 1936 addition

== See also ==
- Government of Columbus, Ohio
